= List of villages in Akwa Ibom State =

This is a list of villages and settlements in Akwa Ibom State, Nigeria organised by local government area (LGA) and district/area (with postal codes also given).

== By postal code ==
Below is a list of Districts, including villages and schools, organised by postal code.

LGA	District	Postal code	Villages
Abak	Abak Urban	532101	Abak Ikot; Abak Itenge; Abak Usung Atai; Abak Usung Idim; Abak Village; Ibagwa; Ikot Akpan Adia Ukpom; Ikot Ebak; Ikot Ekang; Ikot Iyire Ukpom; Ikot Obong Utu; Ikot Udo Usung-Ukpom; Itung; Manta Edem Idim; Manta Village; Mbarakom; Midim Abak; Nto Utom Ukpom; Obio Obom; Okon Abak; Oku Abak; Onuk Ukpom; Utu Edem Akai; Utu Edem Urua
Abak	Afaha Obong	532104	Afaha Esang; Ebebit; Edem Anwa; Eriam; Ikot Akpa Edem; Ikot Akpabio; Ikot Akpan Idim; Ikot Akpan Ikpong; Ikot Ibit Ekpe; Ikot Inyang; Ikot Ndue; Ikot Obio Ikpa; Ikot Obong; Ikot Odiong; Ikot Ubom; Ikot Uden; Ikot Udo Obio Iwok; Ikot Udo Urom; Ikot-Akpakpan; Ikwek; Nna-Enin; Onik Obong; Ukana Mkpa Eyop; Ukukwak; Urnu Obong
Abak	Ediene	532102	Ata Ediene; Ibanag Ediene; Ikot Akwa Ebom; Ikot Inyang Ediene; Ikot Obong Ediene; Ikot Oku Ubara
Abak	Midim	532103	Atan Midim; Ekpat Iduot; Ikot Anyankana; Ikot Edede; Ikot Edong; Ikot Ekiduk; Ikot Ekon; Ikot Eshiet; Ikot Ifang; Ikot Ikpe; Ikot Imo; Ikot Ntuk; Ikot Uko; Nto Obo I; Nto Obo II; Nto Otong; Utu Midim
Abak	Otoro	532105	Abasi; Abiakpo; Atai Otoro; Ibiakpan I; Ibiakpan II; Ibong Ikot Abasi; Ibong Ikot Akpan Abasi; Ibong Otoro; Ikot Ata Udo; Ikot Ebok; Ikot Essien Etok; Ikot Etok Udo; Ikot Obioko; Ikot Odon; Ikot Oku Mfang; Ikot Osom; Nkor Otoro; Uruk Uso
Eastern Obolo	Iko	534107	Atabrikang; Iko; Ikonta; Kampa
Eastern Obolo	Okoroete	534206	Akpabom; Ama Ngbauji; Ama Ngulasi; Amadaka; Atabrikang; Ayama; Bethlehem; Elekpon; Elile; Emeroke I; Emeroke II; Emeremen; Egweenwe; Iko; Ikonta; Iworfe; Kampa; Obianga; Okoro Inyong; Okorobilom; Okoroete; Okoroiti; Okoromboko; Okoromobolo; Okwan Obolo; Otunene; Ozugbo; Umauka
Eket	Afaha Clan	524101	Afaha Atai; Afaha Ukwa; Ata Idung Afaha Ekid; Atai Ndon-Afaha Eket; Ebana; Ede Urua; Edebuk; Effoi; Ekepene Afaha Eket; Ekpene Ukpa; Esit Urua; Etibe; Idim Afia; Idung Imo; Idung Offiong; Idung Udofa; Iko Ekwa; Ikot Afaha; Ikot Udota; Nditia; Odio; Ofriyo; Okopedi Idung Udo; Osiok
Eket	Eket Offiong Clan	524103	Afia Nsit; Asang Ikot-Use Ekong; Ata Idung-Inyang Uso Ekong; Ebebi Ikot Uso; Ekong; Etebi Idung Akpaisang; Etebi Idung-Iwak; Idung Enen Uso; Idung Udo; Ikot Abasi; Ikot Ebiyan; Ikot Eket; Ikot Ibiok; Ikot Odiong; Ikot Udoma; Ikot Use Ekong; Mkpok; Ukwa
Eket	Idua Clan	524102	Atabong; Idua; Ikot Etok; Iseuit Idua; Odoro; Usung Inyang
Eket	Okon Clan	524104	Anana; Ikot Abasi; Ikot Abia; Ikot Akpa Enang; Ikot Akpa Ikpo; Ikot Akpandem; Ikot Ataku; Ikot Ekpo Okon; Ikot Ikpa; Ikot Inyang; Ikot Nsidibe; Ikot Obio; Ikot Obio Ata; Ikot Obioro; Ikot Okudom; Ikot Oso; Ikot Ukpong; Nduo Eduo
Esit Eket	Eke Afaha Clan	524109	Afaha Ekpene; Akpa Utong; Edi
Esit Eket	Eket Offing Clan	524108	Aba Ekpe; Edida Edoir; Edor Atai; Eebi Akwata; Epkene Obo; Etebi Idung-Asan; Ikpa; Mbak Uyo; Ntak Inyang; Odor Nkit; Oniok Edor; Uquo; Urua Okok; Uwuo Iso Edoho
Essien Udim	Adiasim	530113	Adiasim Ambat; Adiasim Ikot Ekon; Adiasim Ikot Essiendot; Adiasim Ikot Udo; Adiosim Atai; Ikot Ambut; Ikot Ata Enim; Ikot Eda; Ikot Ndem; Ikot Ukpong; Ukana Nsasak; Utu Ikot Ekang
Essien Udim	Afaha Clan	530106	Ikiot Akpan Essiet; Ikiot Ebak; Ikot Ada Uto; Ikot Akpan Eka; Ikot Eseh; Ikot Obiokon; Ikot Obong; Ikot Ukpong-Offiong; Nsasak; Nto Nsok
Essien Udim	Ekpen Yongatai Clan	530109	Ata Essien-Mkpatak; Ekpenyong Atai I; Ekpenyong Atai II; Esen Owo; Ikot Akpan; Ikot Asang; Ikot Esifon; Ikot Inyang Udoh; Ikot Ntuen; Ikot Obio Odok; Ikot Ofong; Ikot Osom; Ikot Osung; Ikot Uba; Ikot Ubo; Ikot Udo; Ikot Udom; Inyand; Midim Atan; Ntak Ekpenyang; Nto Obio Akpan; Nto Osung; Nto Udo; Uruk Obong I; Uruk Obong II; Utu Ekpenyang
Essien Udim	Ikpe Annang	530112	Ebe Ikpe; Ekoi Ikpe; Ibam Ikpe; Ikot Abiat; Ikot Ekpe; Ikot Eside; Ikpe Ekpene Oton; Ikpe Ikot Akpan; Ikpe Ikot Ntuen; Ikpe Nung Inyang; Mbiabet Ikpe; Mbiabong Ikpe; Oniong Ono; Udo Ikpe
Essien Udim	Odoro Ikot	530111	Ekpeyong Ufum; Iduog Esimuk; Ikot Andem; Ikot Ebok; Ikot Ekpenyong; Ikot Ibanga; Ikot Idem; Ikot Ineme; Ikot Okom; Ikot Udom Obet; Ikot Udu; Ikot Uko; Ikot Umo Essien; Ikot Utin; Nto Akpan Oko; Ukana Ikot Ntuen; Ukana Mbak Ukot
Essien Udim	Okon Clan	530110	Ifa Okon; Ikot Ama; Ikot Ekefre; Ikot Ekpenyong; Ikot Essien; Ikot Idem-Udo; Ikot Igwe; Ikot Nya; Ikot Ocho; Ikot Oko; Ikot Udo Okure; Ikot Ukot Etor; Ikpe Okon; Nta Ubiem; Nto Ikpo; Nyi Okon; Ufuku Ikot Ama; Umon Okon
Essien Udim	Ukana East	530108	Iboho; Ikot Akpabin; Ikot Akpan Esang; Ikot Akpan Essien; Ikot Akpan Ifia; Ikot Akpan Inyang; Ikot Ekon; Ikot Esidomo; Ikot Eso; Ikot Essien; Ikot Eta; Ikot Nkwa; Ikot Obong Edong; Ikot Ofok; Ikot Ofong; Ikot Osom; Uwak Eat
Essien Udim	Ukana West	530107	Akpa Ufong; Atan Ikot-Okoro; Ekpo; Ikot afanga; Ikot Akpabio; Ikot Akpan Ntiia; Ikot Ankan; Ikot Ayara; Ikot Edet; Ikot Okuo Onuk; Ikot Osom; Ikot Otu; Ikot Out; Ikot Ude-Idim; Ikot Udo Ekpat; Ikot Udo Etim; Ikot Udo-Inam; Ikot Ukpong Eto; Ntak Ikot Akpan; Onuk; Onuk Ikot-Abia; Ukana Ikot Ide; Uwa West
Etim-Ekpo	Ikono	532107	Ikot Akpa Nsek; Ikot Akpakpan; Ikot Edek; Ikot Iya; Ikot Obio Ema; Ikot Odong; Ikot Udo Nta; Ikpe Atai; Ikpe-Ikot-Akwa; Inen Ikot Okpo; Nto Edet; Nto Unang; Nung Oko Ikot; Nwot Ikono
Etim-Ekpo	Obong	532109	Abak Obong; Abat Town; Esa Obong; Ibio Edem Urua; Ibio Nung Achat; Ibio Nung Iba; Ikot Ama; Ikot Awak; Ikot Ese; Ikot Esop; Ikot Inung; Ikot Iya; Ikot Mkporikpo; Ikot Obio Ama; Ikot Udo Obong; Ikot Umo Ebat; Mkporikpo Utit-Idim; Ndot Obong; Obon Ebot; Obong Ata Essien; Obong Ikot Akpan; Obong Ntak; Obong Utit Idim; Omum Unyam; Otoro Obong; Udianga Enem
Etim-Ekpo	Uruk	532106	Atan; Atuai; Ete Edet; Ikot Akasor; Ikot Akpan Odomo; Ikot Ikpa; Ikot Inyang; Ikot Inyang Ekpo; Ikot Obio Nta; Ikot Udo Etor; Ntak Inyang; Uruk Ata Ikot; Uruk Ata Ikot Ebo; Uruk Ata Ikot Ekpor; Uruk Ata Ikot Isemin; Uruk Ata Ikot Otok; Uruk Ata Ikot Udedia; Uruk Ata Ikot-Akpankpan; Uruk Ata Nsidung
Etim-Ekpo	Utu Etim	532108	Ekwet Ikot Ebo; Etek Utu Ikot Eboro; Ikot Akpan; Ikot Mboho; Ikot Nkim; Nto Obo; Uruk Ata Ikot Akpan; Uruk Eshiet; Utu Etim Ekpo; Utu Idung Akpan Udom; Utu Ikot Ekpo; Utu Ikot Imonte; Utu Ikot Nkor; Utu Nsekhe
Etinan	Etinan Urban	522101	Afaha Akpan Ekpo; Afaha Iman; Edem Ekpat; Ekpene Obom; Ekpene Ukpa; Etinan; Ikot Abasi; Ikot Akata; Ikot Eba; Ikot Ebiyak; Ikot Ebo; Ikot Ekang; Ikot Ikpuho; Ikot Inyang Osom; Ikot Udo Abia; Ikot Udo Oto; Ishiet Erong; Ndon Eyo I; Ndon Eyo II; Ndon Utim; Oto Akpan
Etinan	Northern Iman	522102	Afaha Efiat; Ekom; Ikot Akpabio; Ikot Akpanya; Ikot Ananga; Ikot Ekan; Ikot Esua; Ikot Isong; Ikot Nkang; Ikot Nseyen; Ikot Obio Inyang; Ikot Udo Adia; Mbiete No.1
Etinan	Southern Iman	522103	Afaha Urua Essien; Akapasak Efa; Anyam Efa; Ata Efa; Awa Ntong; Efa Mbioto Mbiete; Effiat Mbioto; Eso-Efa; Ikot Akpa Esa; Ikot Akpan Ese; Ikot Akpan Obio Eket; Ikot Ekot; Ikot Ese; Ikot Esen Oku; Ikot Etakpo; Ikot Etor; Ikot Ibok; Ikot Inyang; Ikot Itina; Ikot Mfon; Ikot Nsung; Ikot Nte; Ikot Obio Eka; Ikot Obio Iko; Ikot Obong Ikot Inyang; Ikot Ukpong; Ikot Umiang Ede;Ikot Akpan Ntembom; Iwo Etor; Nkana; Oniong
Ibeno	Ibeno Clan	524110	Akata; Atabrikang; Atai; Itio Esek; Idung Abasi Okure; Ikot Inwang; Inua Eyet Ikot; Itak Abasi; Itak Idim Ekpe; Itak Idim Ukpa; Itak Ifa; Iwuo Okpom; Iwuo Okpom Opolom; Iwuoachang; Mkpanak; Ndito Eka Iba; Ntafre; Okom Ita; Okoroutip; Okposo I; Okposo II; Opolom; Upenekang; Usuk Ikim Ekene; Usuk Ikim Ukwaha (Nta Ikang)
Ibesikpo-Asutan	Asutan Epe	521109	Akpa Utong; Ikot Abasi; Ikot Abasi Ebin; Ikot Akpa; Ikot Akpa Erong; Ikot Akpa Eyoho; Ikot Akpa-Ndua; Ikot Akpabin; Ikot Akpasia; Ikot Akpaso; Ikot Annung; Ikot Atang Esen; Ikot Atang Uma; Ikot Ebre; Ikot Ediom; Ikot Edung; Ikot Enua; Ikot Itok; Ikot Iyan; Ikot Mbang; Ikot Mbride; Ikot Nkim; Ikot Nko; Ikot Nkwo; Ikot Obio Edim; Ikot Obio Nko; Ikot Obio-Ata; Ikot Obong Ediene; Ikot Oku Akpan; Ikot Ossom; Ikot Udo Eyoho; Ikot Udo-Nkan; Ikot Ukop; Mbak Ekpe; Ndikpo Atang; Ntuk Otong; Ntuk Otong Ibiaku; Obio Aduang
Ibesikpo-Asutan	Ibesikpo	521110	Aba Ukpo; Afaha Atai; Afaha Etok; Afaha Ikot Osom; Afaha Ikot Owop; Afaha Ikot-Obio Nkan; Afaha Udo Eyop; Ebere Out; Edem Ibiok; Ediam; Ekan; Ibe Sikpo; Ikot Abasi Idem; Ikot Akpa Edu; Ikot Akpan Abia; Ikot Akpan Etok; Ikot Ambon; Ikot Edaha; Ikot Essien; Ikot Eto; Ikot Ide Akpakpan; Ikot Ide Etuk Udo; Ikot Ikere; Ikot Iko; Ikot Obio Odongo; Ikot Obio Offong; Ikot Oduot; Ikot Okubo; Ikot Okure; Ikot Udo; Ikot Udo Ekpo; Itokko; Mbierebe Akpawat; Mbierebe Obio; Mbikpong Atai; Mbikpong Ikot Edim; Nung Ette; Nung Oku; Nung Udoe; Nung Ukana; Nung Ukana Ikot Efre; Obio Akpan; Oku Ibesikpo
Ibiono-Ibom	Ibiono (Southern)	520115	Afaha Obio Eno; Asating; Ikot Ada Idem; Ikot Akpabio; Ikot Ambang; Ikot Ekpo Obio; Ikot Enyin; Ikot Obio Ama; Ikot Osukpong; Ikot Ukana; Ikot Ukpong; Ikpa Ibiono; Ikpidop; Mbiabam Ibiono; Mbiakpan Atan; Miakpan Ikot Edem; Nkin Ibiono; Obio Ibiono; Okobo Ibiono; Use Ikot Ekop
Ibiono-Ibom	Ibiono I	520114	Afaha Itiat; Ikot Akpa-Idang; Ikot Akpabio Ididep; Ikot Akpan; Ikot Akpan Nya I; Ikot Akpan Obong; Ikot Akpan-Nya; Ikot Andem; Ikot Antia; Ikot Atim; Ikot Edo Ididep; Ikot Edok; Ikot Eko; Ikot Ekpot; Ikot Essien Ididep; Ikot Inyang; Ikot Nko Ididep; Ikot Obong; Ikot Odiong; Ikot Okpot; Ikot Onwen; Ikot Udo; Ikot Udo Obuk; Mbiabam; Obot Enang Ntan Mbat; Odoro Aka; Usuk Aka
Ibiono-Ibom	Ibiono II	520116	Abat Use Abat; Afaha Ikot Adaha; Afaha Nsai; Afaha Utuat; Atan Nsai; Atna Aya; Awat Nkang; Edem Idim; Ibiaku Inyang Isong; Idere; Ikot Akpan Abasi; Ikot Akpan-Atai; Ikot Amba; Ikot Ambit; Ikot Anan; Ikot Anang; Ikot Andia; Ikot Edet; Ikot Inyang Ekpene; Ikot Mbuk; Ikot Nkpo; Ikot Obio Eyen; Ikot Obio-Edep; Ikot Obio-Okon; Ikot Odiong Use; Ikot Udo Ibiono; Ikot Udom; Ikot Usen; Ikpa Ikot Enuen; Ikpa Ikot Ubo; Itu Akan; Itu Atai; Itu Udo; Mbiabong Ekoi; Ndoro Obot; Nkwa Ibiono; Obot Ukana; Odung Etem; Oku Obom; Use Ikot Odiong; Use Ndon; Usuk Ibiaku
Ibiono-Ibom	Ibiono III	520118	Afaha Ise Ono; Afua; Aka Ikot Abasi; Aka Ikot Udo Eno; Akpa; Akpan Ikot Udu; Ekim Ibiaku Omu; Ekio Idoro; Enyin-Idoro; Essen; Ibiaku Ikot Udom; Ididep Usuk; Idoro; Ikot; Ikot Abasi Inyang; Ikot Abia Aka; Ikot Abia Idoro; Ikot Akpan Uso Ono; Ikot Akpan-Okpon Ono; Ikot Antia Ididep; Ikot Antia-Idoro; Ikot Efim; Ikot Ekpe; Ikot Ekwo; Ikot Esidem; Ikot Esifa; Ikot Eto Idoro; Ikot Idaha; Ikot Ide Ono; Ikot Inyang Eno; Ikot Mkpebe; Ikot Nya Ono; Ikot Obio-Afaha; Ikot Obo Idoro; Ikot Obom Idere; Ikot Odubo Ono; Ikot Okpoho; Ikot Ubo Mbiabong; Ikot Ubo Ono; Ikot Udo Ukana Ono; Ikot Ukporo; Ikot Use-Idoro; Ikot Utiat Ono; Ikot Uwa; Ikpedip; Inwun Use; Itai Idoro; Mbiakpan Ididep; Nkwa Ikot Ekwong; Nsai Use; Obot Afia; Obot Afia Idoro; Obot Oko; Obot Ukim; Obot Ukim Ntan Mbat; Okobo Aka; Okporo-Idoro; Okpot-Idoro; Ukim-Idoro; Urua Abasi Umoh; Use Ikot-Amama; Utong-Idoro
Ibiono-Ibom	Ibiono III Central	520117	Edem Urua; Ntan Akpan Udom; Ekput; Ibaiku Ikot-Oku Ekim; Ibiatuk; Ikot Aba; Ikot Akpan Obong; Ikot Ankit; Ikot Antia; Ikot Ebom; Ikot Edung; Ikot Ekpene; Ikot Ekpenyong; Ikot Ekwere; Ikot Eso; Ikot Essiet; Ikot Ette; Ikot Idem Nten Ebere; Ikot Inyang Ididep; Ikot Ntung; Ikot Obio Akpan; Ikot Obio Asa; Ikot Obo; Ikot Onwong Ididep; Ikot Uba; Ikot Ubong Obio Eno; Ikot Udo Effum; Ikot Udo Ibiono; Ikot Udom; Ikot Ukana; Ikot Ukpong; Ikot Unike; Ikpa Ikot Uneke; Itu Andem; Itukho; Ndo Ndem; Oko Ita; Osuk Ntan; Udioho Ntan Ekere; Usuk Ntan Ekere
Ibiono-Ibom	Ikpanya	520119	Aburu; Akani Obio; Esit Ikpanya; Ikot Adaha; Ikot Ukobo; Ikpanaya; Mbak Unoh; Nditung
Ika	Achan Ika	532110	Abiakana; Achan; Ikot Abara; Ikot Akata; Ikot Akpa Idiong; Ikot Akpa-Offiong; Ikot Akpan Offiong; Ikot Akpan Okure; Ikot Antia; Ikot Ebenwong; Ikot Ebo; Ikot Edem Inyang; Ikot Eseden; Ikot Esu; Ikot Idiong Etor; Ikot Idomo; Ikot Inwang; Ikot Inyang Ese; Ikot Inyang Udo; Ikot Okoro-Ata; Ikot Osukpong; Ikot Otuko; Ikot Oyo; Ikot Udo; Itung Achan; Nto Akan; Nto Mfang; Nto Ntia; Nto Udo Igwe; Nto Udofa 1; Nto Udofa 11; Nto Ukara; Nto Ukpong-Otong; Odoro Ikot Esedem; Otomo; Urua Inyang
Ika	Ika Annang	532112	Edem Akai; Ikot Esien Eshiet; Ikot Inyang Odoro; Ikot Nya; Ikot Onono; Ikot Uko; Ikpe Annang; Iwukem; Nto Akpan Etim; Nto Mbadum; Nto Ukong; Nto Urua Odoro; Nto Usoh; Uruk Ata II
Ika	Ito Clan	532111	Afen Ibom; Afen Ikot Okoro; Afen Ikot Udonya/Udonja; Ikot Abai Udo; Ikot Akpan Anwa; Ikot Akpan Ifang; Ikot Edim; Ikot Ekong; Ikot Inyanga Ika; Ikot Osom; Ikot Otong; Ikot Urom; Ikot Ukang; Imaman; Itak Ikot Onono; Ito Ika; Nto Udoete; Nto Urua Itak
Ikono	Ekpene/Ediene	531112	Afaha Ediene; Aka Ekpene-Ikot; Atai Obio Ediene; Ayan; Edem Iyere; Ediene Atai; Ekpene Ediene; Etip Ediene; Ibiannang; Idoro Ediene; Ikot Antem; Ikot Ediene; Ikot Oku-Ediene; Ikot Okubo; Ikot Onwon Ediene; Ikot Udo Enang; Mbat Aka Ekpene; Nnung Idio; Osuk Ediene; Udek Atai; Usuk Obio Ediene; Uyo Afaha Nkan; Uyo Obio
Ikono	Ikono South	531113	Asanga Usung; Edem; Eduo; Ekang; Ekpene Obom; Esem-Udo; Ibakasi-Ikot; Ibakesi Ukpom Unya; Ibakesi-Ikot-Mbiet; Ikot-Ete Udoe; Mbiabon Ikot-Ntia; Mbiabong-Ukan; Mfon; Obom Nkwongo; Ukopon; Ukpim Ikot-Imo; Ukpim Ikot-Inyang; Ukpim Ita; Ukpom Atai Ession; Ukpom Ekpene; Ukpom Ekpene-Inuen; Ukpom Ibakesi-Ikot; Ukpom Ikot Akpakpam; Ukpom Ikot Anwana; Ukpom Ikot Anwana Abasi; Ukpom Ikot Edem Udo; Ukpom Ikot Ekem; Ukpom Ikot Etim; Ukpom Ikot Ntuen; Ukpom Ikot Nya; Ukpom Ikot Nyoho; Ukpom Ikot Odung; Ukpom Ikot Okure; Ukpom Ikot Udo; Ukpom Ikot Udo Nke; Ukpom Nung Eduo; Ukpom Ita
Ikono	Itak	531119	Afaha Itak; Afaha Obio-Enwang; Ekpemiong; Ikot Akpan Odung; Ikot Eduek Itak; Ikot Efre Itak; Ikot Ekpan Odung; Ikot Ide Itak; Ikot Inyang-Itak; Ikot Udofia Itak; Itak; Nung Okoro; Nung Udoe Itak; Obio Itak; Obot Etim; Odung Itak; Ukap Ekpan Itak; Ukpap Ikot Idang; Ukpapa Itak
Ikono	Ndiya	531118	Ibiaku Ikot Edet; Ibok Ndiya; Ikot Abasi Ndiya; Ikot Akpa Edet Ndiya; Ikot Akpa Edok; Ikot Akpa Ekpuk; Ikot Akpa Idem Ndiya; Ikot Akpan; Ikot Akpan Ndiya; Ikot Akpayara Ndiya; Ikot Anyan Ndija; Ikot Enua; Ikot Etefia-Ndiya; Ikot Idaha; Ikot Nto Ndiya; Ikot Obio Edi; Ikot Offiong Ndiya; Ikot Udu Ndiya; Mbi akpa Ndiya; Nkara Obio
Ikono	Nquot	531111	Abak Ikot Akpan-Oduot; Edem Edet; Esien; Idem; Ikot Abia; Ikot Akpa Isiak; Ikot Akpan; Ikot Enie; Ikot Idomo; Ikot Nkwo; Ikot Nseyen; Ikot Nya; Ikot Obio-Ata; Ikot Obok; Ikot Okpon; Ikot Udo; Ikot Umo; Inyang; Nko; Nkwot Ikot Akpan; Nkwot Ikot Apan; Nung Eyio; Nung Imo; Nung Inuen; Okpoto
Ikot Abasi	Edemaya	534102	Atan Eka Iko; Atan Ikpe; Ediduo; Iboro; Ikot Aboa Ndia; Ikot Akpabo; Ikot Akpan; Ikot Efre; Ikot Eneni; Ikot Etenge Ndom; Ikot Eyen Imo; Ikot Ikara; Ikot Iyire; Ikot Ndien; Ikot Obio Akpan; Ikot Obio Ekpe; Ikot Oboro Enyin; Ikot Okpok; Ikot Ubo Akama; Ikot Ufot; Ikot Unya; Ikot Uso Ide; Ukan
Ikot Abasi	Ikpa Ibekwe	534101	Ata Udo Usung; Ikong Ukpo Inua; Ikot Aba; Ikot Abasi; Ikot Akpan-Ata; Ikot Essien; Ikot Etetuk; Ikot Obong; Ikpetim; Uta Ewa
Ikot Abasi	Ikpa Nung Asang	534104	Akpabom; Essene; Ikot Ada Udo; Ikot Akpa Enin/Ikot Esang; Ikot Akpa Idiang; Ikot Eduo; Ikot Ekpe; Ikot Etefia; Ikot Imo; Ikot Obiok; Ikot Osudu; Ikot Usop; Ndak Ekom; Nduk
Ikot Abasi	Ukpom Okom	534105	Ikot Ata Udo; Ikot Ukpong Ekere; Ikot Umiang-Okon; Iman; Udo Mbon
Ikot Abasi	Ukpum Ete	534103	Abasute; Abiran; Essien Etuk; Ete; Ikot Akan; Ikot Akpan Udo; Ikot Ataha; Ikot Etenge-Ete; Ikot Ikwot; Ikot Okwo; Ikwa; Inang; Itak Abasi; Nda Uku; Obio Akama; Okpoto Ete; Ukpum Ete; Umeneke I; Umeneke II
Ikot Ekpene	Amanyam	530102	Abak Ifia; Abiakpan Ikot Irem; Abiakpo Ntak-Inyang; Adaratak; Ata Essien Mbiaso; Ibong Ikot Akan; Ikot Akpan-Abia; Ikot Ediet; Ikot Enwang; Ikot Obong Otoro; Ikot Osura; Ikot Out; Ikot Uboh; Ikot Udo Osung; Mbiaso Ikot Uso-udo; Mbiaso Nto-Obio Ekong; Nbo Obodom Ibiaso; Nyara Enyin-Ntong Uno
Ikot Ekpene	Ikot Ekpene Urban	530101	Abak Oko; Abiakpo Edem Idim; Abiakpo Ikot Essien; Akanaan; Ibiakpan; Ibiakpan Ikot; Ibiakpan Nto Akan; Ibiakpo Edem Idim; Ibong Nto Akan; Ifuho; Ikot Abia Idem; Ikot Idem; Ikot Inyang; Ikot Obong Edong; Ikot Out; Ikot-Ekpene-Village; Ikotobio Okpon; Itak Ikot Udo-Okop; Ndem Ekpot; Nkap Ikot Obio Ebok; Nsiak; Obioekere; Uruk Uso; Utu Edem Usung; Utu Ikot Ekrenyong; Utu Ikot Essien; Utu Ikpe
Ini	Aka Ekpene	531117	Aka Ekpene
Ini	Asanting	531106	Asantin Nquono; Asanting Atan; Asanting Ikot Efredie; Asanting Obot-Obom; Etok; Ikono; Itak Ikot Akpan Ndem; Itak Ikot Udo; Iton Odoro; Mbio-Oku Ikot-Odung; Oduk
Ini	Ibakesi	531101	Asanting Utit Ikpe; Edem Idim Ibakesi; Ikot Ubeng; Ikot Udo Asan; Mbiakpa Ibakesi; Nkwot Etok; Usuk Ibaken
Ini	Ibiaku	531105	Ibiaku Ata; Ibiaku Ikot-Ukana; Ibiaku Okpo; Mbiabong Ikon-Ekpene-Oton; Ndiya Mfia
Ini	Ikpe/Ikot	531109	Akpayak Ikpe; Ebam Edek; Esiyere; Ibam Edet; Ibam Obot Enen; Ikot Osom Ikpe; Mbaiabet Ikot; Mbiabet Ikot; Mbiabet Ikot Efa; Mbiabet Ikot Oton; Mbiabet Ikot Udo-Uba; Mbiabet Ikot-Udo; Mbiabet Otung; Mbiabet-Eyehedia; Ndot Ikpe; Nna Enin; Nsit Ikpe; Oniong Ono; Usung Ita
Ini	Itu Mbonuso	531116	Ananammong; Ibo; Ikot Esien; Ikot Nta; Ikporom; Mkpu; Nchana Ebua; Obot Ndom; Ogu
Ini	Iwerre	531110	Edem Urua; Ikweme; Mbiabong; Nturi; Obotme; Okpoto; Ukpa Okon
Ini	Mbiabon G. I.	531104	Ibisikpo Ikot Udo; Iden Udo; Ikot Akpan Ntim; Mbiabong Ekpip; Mbiabong Ikot Akpan; Mbiabong Ikot Etefia; Mbiabong Oku Ikot- Abasi; Mbiabong Ukan Ikot; Mbiabong Ukan Ikot-Nung; Mbiafun Ikot Ntia
Ini	Mbiabong II	531108	Afaha Ikot Akpan-Edu; Aka Ekpene; Eminang; Ikot Akpa Edu; Itak Edem Isa; Itak Ikot Obio; Mbiabong Ikot Eminang; Mbiabong Ikot Etim; Mbiabong Ikot Udo; Mbiabong Ikot Udofia; Mbiabong Mbat; Mbiafun Eyehe Adia; Mbiafun Ikot Abasi; Mbiafun Mmananu; Mbiafun Ubot Oko; Ndinya Ikot Imo; Nung Oku; Oku Ikot Edaha
Ini	Mbiafun	531107	Mbiafun
Ini	Nkari	531115	Anwafia; Ibono Okporo; Ibono Usuk; Ikot Akpan; Ikot Offiong; Ikot Uko; Mbento; Obong; Offufa; Ubie Nkene
Ini	Nung-Ukem	531114	Akpa-Etok; Essien; Etefia; Mbiafan Nkwono; Mkpe; Ndiya Etok; Nung Ukem-Ikot-Udom; Nung Ukim Ikot; Nung Ukim Ikot-Okori; Nung Ukim Ikot-Uko; Nung Ukin Ikot Abia
Ini	Odoro Ikpe	531102	Ekoi Atan Ubom; Ekoi Eben Obom; Ekoi Ikot Abia; Ekoi Ikot Ebom; Ekoi Ikot Nyoho; Ekoi Ikot Ofon; Ekoi Ikot Udofe; Ibam Ukwot; Ibiono Ewuro; Ikot Ukpong; Ikpe Ikot Nkon; Itie Ikpe; Nkana Ikpe; Odoro Ikpe
Ini	Uquok	531103	Aba Itiat; Anwa Urua; Asanting Obot Obom; Atan; Edem Akai; Ibesikpo Edem Idem; Iko Atia; Ikot Abasi; Ikot Akpan; Ikot Andem; Ikot Ata Udo; Ikot Awa; Ikot Ede; Ikot Edem; Ikot Emem; Ikot Ese; Ikot Obio Asang; Ikot Ubam; Ikot Udo Ata; Ikot Udo Eboho; Ikot Uno; Iton Mong; Ukwok Ikot Idut; Usuk Idim
Itu	Ayadehe	520111	Ikot Akpabio-Ayadehe; Ikot Onoi; Ikot Udo
Itu	East Itam	520112	Adang Itam; Afaha I; Efi Itam; Ekim Itam I; Ekim Itam II; Ekritam Akpan Obong; Ema Itam; Enen Atai Itam; Ibiaku Ikot Obong; Ikot Akpan Itam; Ikot Andem Itam; Ikot Annie; Ikot Anse Itam; Ikot Ayan; Ikot Nya Itam; Ikot Ukap; Ikot Ukono; Ikot Uso Akpan; Mbak Atai Itam; Mbak Obio Itam; Mbiabong Afaha; Mbiatok Itam; Mkpeti Itam; Nkim Itam; Ntiat Itam; Obong Itam; Odiok Afaha Itam; Okon Itam; Uyo Itam
Itu	Itu	520108	Afia Isong; Akpa Ekpene Oton; Edem Inyang; Esin Ufot; Esuk Itu; Ikot Ukpo Itu; Obot Etim; Obot Itu; Odu Itu; Okoho Itu
Itu	Mbiabo	520110	Efik Ibuno; Etehenten; Eton Ani; Ikot Efah; Ikot Offiong; Ikot Out; Mbiabo Edere; Mkpana Uruk; Nya Anating; Okono; Ufok Offiong Ani
Itu	Oku	520109	Ika Oku; Ikot Abiyak; Ikot Adakpan; Ikot Antuen; Ikot Eka Iko; Ikot Esia; Ikot Essien; Ikot Ntu Oku; Settlements
Itu	West Itam	520113	Afaha Itam; Afaha Ube; Afaha Ude Oke; Atai Ibiaku Itam; Ekit-Itom Akpan Obong; Ikot Abasi Itam; Ikot Ayan Itam; Ikot Ebom Itam; Ikot Ekang; Ikot Ekwere Itam; Ikot Emien Itam; Ikot Etpuk; Ikot Mbonde Itam; Ikot Obio Atai I; Ikot Obio Enang; Ikot Obong Edong; Mbak Ikot Oku; Mbak Obio; Mbribit Itam; Ntak Inyang; Nung Ukot Itam; Nwut Usiong
Mbo	Afaha Okpo	523113	Ekiebong; Eyo Efai; Eyo Ukut; Ibete; Ibuet Ikot; Uba; Ubotuong; Udini; Udombo; Udung Eyo Adaeba; Uko Akpan
Mbo	Effiat	523114	Akpa Nkanua; Akwa Obio Effiat; Asiok Obufa; Esuk Anwang; Ibuot Utan; Ine Inua Abasi; Inua Abasi; James Town; Mbe Ndoro; Obio Iyata; Obong Nim; Usuk Effiat; Utan Antai; Utan Brama; Utan Udombo; Utang Efiong
Mbo	Ukwong	523115	Akai Ati; Akai owu; Akprang; Eprang Udo; Ibaka (Uda); Isong Inyang; Kprang (Uda); Mkpang Utong; Offi (Uda); Onukim (Uda); Osu Udesi; Udung Eyo Unyenge; Uke Nteghe; Utit Atai Unyenge
Mkpat-Enin	Ibiaku	534109	Esa Ekpo; Ibekwe-Akpan Nya; Ibiaku Esa Ekpo; Ikot Abasi Akpan; Ikot Abia Enin; Ikot Aka; Ikot Ata/Nung Ikono; Ikot Ekpenyong.; Ikot Idiong; Ikot Itina; Ikot Ntot; Ikot-Akpabong; Ikot-Ebak; Minya Ntak; Ndot/Abat Nya; Nya Odiong
Mkpat-Enin	Ikpa Ibom	534111	Atanuk; Ekim; Ibiotio; Ikot Aba; Ikot Akata; Ikot Akpa-Ekop; Ikot Akpabio Ukam; Ikot Akpaden; Ikot Akpan Ukam; Ikot Ayan; Ikot Edim; Ikot Edong Ukam; Ikot Ekong; Ikot Ekpang; Ikot Enin; Ikot Etefia Ukam; Ikot Eto; Ikot Iseghe; Ikot Obio Ekpong; Ikot Obio Ndoho; Ikot Obio-Akai; Ikot Okop - Odong; Ikot Oyoro; Ikot Ukwa; Ikotn Inyang-Okop; Ndom Gbodom; Ndom Ibotio; Obioete
Mkpat-Enin	Ikpa Ikono	534110	Asana; Ekpuk; Ibianga; Iffe; Ikot Abia-Utok; Ikot Afang; Ikot Eda; Ikot Ekpaw; Ikot Enyienge; Ikot Esen Akpan Ntuen; Ikot Mkpeye; Ikot Obio-Nso; Ikot Umiang; Ikot Unya; Iton
Nsit Atai	Eastern Nsit	521108	Adia Nsit; Akpang Offop; Etobodom; Ibakang; Ibedu; Ibiakpan; Idiaba; Idifa; Idikpa; Idikpa Ikot Ntung; Ikot Abasi; Ikot Abiaenyie; Ikot Abiyan; Ikot Akpabio; Ikot Akpan Ike; Ikot Asua; Ikot Ebita; Ikot Edebe; Ikot Edong; Ikot Eket; Ikot Ekpot; Ikot Esen; Ikot Esop; Ikot Essien; Ikot Inyang; Ikot Itie-Udong; Ikot Mkpo; Ikot Nkpene; Ikot Ntuen; Ikot Obong; Ikot Otu; Ikot Ubok Udom; Ikot Udofia; Ikot Ukpong; Ikot Uyo Nsit; Iwok Atai; Iwok Nsit; Iwok Obio Aduang; Nda Nsit; Ndisiak; Ndon Ekpe; Ndon Ikot Itie-Udung; Ndon Omun; Odot No.1; Odot No.2; Odot No.3; Okoro Atai; Okoro Nsit; Ubetim; Udofia; Unyehe Nsit
Nsit-Ibom	Asang Clan	522110	Afaha nsit I; Afia Nsit I; Anyam Nsit; Asang; Ekpene Ukpan; Ikat Nsit; Ikot Asat; Ikot Idem; Ikot Ntan Nsit; Ikot Ntuem; Ikot Obio Edim; Ikot Obok; Ikot Ofiok-Nsit; Ikot Ofiong Nsit; Ikot Oku Nsit; Ikot Otong-Nsit; Mbak Nsit I; Mbiakot; Miokporo Obio Nsit; Nditung Nsit; Nduo Eduo; Obiokpok; Obo Atai; Obo Etim; Obo Etok; Obo Ikot Ita; Obo Ntong; Okukuk; Okwo Nsit; Ukat Nsit; Ukot Nsit
Nsit-Ibom	Mbiaso Clan	522106	Afaha Abia; Afaha Ikot; Afaha Ikot Ede; Afaha Ntup; Afaha Ofiong; Afia Nsit II; Edebom; Ikot Akpan; Ikot Akpan Etang; Ikot Ebre; Ikot Nya; Ikot Obio Asanga; Ikot Obio Etan; Ikot Odiong; Mbiaso; Mbikporo II; Nkwot
Nsit-Ubium	Ibiakpan/Obotim Clan	522108	Edebom; Ibiakpan; Ikot Ada Okp; Ikot Akpabon; Ikot Akpan Ibakpan; Ikot Edikpe; Ikot Ekpene Udo; Ikot Imo; Ikot Udo Ime; Ikot Ukobo; Ikpatu; Ntiti Oton; Ukat Atan
Nsit-Ubium	Itreto Clan	522107	Atan; Ikot Akan; Ikot Ansang; Ikot Ede; Ikot Ekpan; Ikot Etim; Ikot Etobo; Ikot Iyire; Ikot Okobo; Usung Inyand
Nsit-Ubium	Ndiya	522104	Afia Nsit Atai; Ikot Abasi-Ufat; Ikot Akpaofuk; Ikot Edibon; Ikot Ewang; Ikot Inyang Eti; Ikot Obio Ndua; Ikot Ukap; Ndiya Usung Inyang
Nsit-Ubium	Ubium North	522105	Atiam Kpat; Edem Idim Okpot; Ikot Akpan-Abia; Ikot Ekwere; Ikot Esen; Ikot Eyo; Ikot Oduatang; Ikot Okwot; Ikot Osom; Mbiekene; Ndukpo Ise
Nsit-Ubium	Ubium South	522109	Akai; Ekpene Ukim; Ibiemin; Ikot Akpa Eno; Ikot Akpa Mba; Ikot Edok; Ikot Enwana; Ikot Nkor; Ikot Ntung; Ikot Okoro; Ikot Okpodo; Ikot Okpyot; Ikot Ubo; Ikot Udo Ide; Ikot Udo Iton; Ikot Uso; Mbat Uno; Nung Obong; Obio Ekit; Obio Ubium; Odoro Atasung; Ukat
Obot-Akara	Ikot Abia	530104	Abak Ukpom; Abiakpo Idiaha; Abiakpo Ikot Abasi-Inyang; Ama Okop; Ibiakpan; Ikot Abia; Ikot Akpan-Enuek; Ikot Ikok; Ikot Moboho; Ikot Obo Nto; Ikot Obuk; Ikot Ukpong Ikot Udan; Ikot Upeng; Ikot-Udom Anwa; Imana; Mbat Esifon; Nto Eton; Ntong Uno; Obon Ukwa I; Obon Ukwa II; Okop; Unik Osung
Obot-Akara	Nto Edino	530105	Abama; Abasi Eduo; Abiakipo Nkap; Abiakpo Ikot-; Abiakpo Ikot-Ukam; Atan Ibong; Edem Idem Okpo Eto; Ibong Uruk; Ibongokpo-Eto; Ikot Essien; Ikot Eyem; Ikot Ide; Ikot Idem Udo; Ikot Mba; Ikot Mem; Ikot Oku; Ikot Osom; Ikot Udo Nto-Ide; Ikot Ukana; Nto Asiak; Nto Edino Obot; Nto Ekpe; Nto Esu; Nto Ide; Nto Ide Anwa-Effiat; Nto Obio Iwok; Nto Omen; Okpo Eto Ikot Imo; Usaka
Obot-Akara	Obot Akara	530103	Abiakpo; Abiakpo Ibo; Abiakpo Ikot; Abiakpo Ikot-Obio Nting; Atai Ikwen; Esa Iken; Ikot Abasi Eyop; Ikot Abia Osom; Ikot Atasung; Ikot Ntuen; Ikot Utin; Ikot Utu; Ikot Utu Ikot Akpan; Ikpe Mbak Eyop; Ikpe Usung-Ita; Ikwen Ikot Udom; Inyang I; Inyang II; Mkpa Uno; Nko Nto Nkono; Nko Nto Nkoboho; Nsit Ikpe; Nto Ekpu; Nto Ndung; Nto Obio Ikang; Oku Obom; Uto Ekpu Ikot; Utu Ikot
Okobo	Atabong	521103	Ikot Iquo; Ikot Odiong; Ikot Okokon; Ikot Osukpong
Okobo	Ebughu	521105	Eyede; Ikono; Itak Ekim; Nsie; Uruting
Okobo	Eta	521101	Afaha Nsung; Akanawana; Amamong; Anua Okopedi; Ape Amamong; Atai Amamong; Atai Atai Otope; Atipa Odobo; Atipa Okopedi; Ebighi Eta; Ekpene Ekim Eta; Ibawa; Mbieduo; Nsating; Nung Atai Eta; Nung Udom Odobo; Obufi
Okobo	Ibighi	521107	Afaha Akai; Atiabang; Oyoku Assang; Urue Ita
Okobo	Odu	521102	Akiba Obo; Anua Ekeya; Ebighi Edu; Ebighi Okobo; Ekpene Ekim; Esuk Inwang; Idibi Enin; Nda; Nung Ukana; Obot Inwang; Ube; Ufok Esuk
Okobo	Okiuso	521106	Akai Nyo; Isa Okiuso; Itak Okiuso; Udung Afiang; Udung Amkpe; Udung Ukpong; Udung Ulo; Udung Umo
Okobo	Ukwong	521104	Afaha Osu; Ebighi Anwa Ikpi; Ebighi Anwa Oro; Etieke Udong Eto; Eweme; Eyo Nku; Itak Uyati; Mbukpo Oduobo; Ndoung; Osu Offi; Oti Oron; Otieke; Ubak; Utine Eyekung; Utine Ndoung
Onna	Awa Clan	524107	Abak Ishiet; Afaha Atai; Afaha Ikot Ankang; Afaha Ikot Idem Udo; Afaha Ikot-; Afaha Ubium; Akpan-Nkpe; Atiamkpat Nung-; Awa; Awa Nkp; Awandon; Edem Idim; Ikot Akpan; Ikot Ese Ishiet; Ikot Obio-Eket; Ikot Obong-Ishiet; Ishiet; Nko; Ntan Ide; Oku Ekanem
Onna	Iquita	523119	Eyo - Essi; Eyo - Esu; Eyo - Usotai; Eyo - Utumong; Udung - Ndung; Udung - Uso
Onna	Nung Ndem Clan	524106	Ikot Ndua Iman; Ikot Nkan; Mkpok; Ndom Eyo; Okat
Onna	Oniong Clan	524106	Akpabom; Ikot Abasi; Ikot Akpatek; Ikot Annang; Ikot Ebekpo; Ikot Ebidang; Ikot Ebire; Ikot Edor; Ikot Ikom Ibom; Ikot Ndudot; Ikot Nuten; Ikot Udo; Ikwe; Mkpa Eto; Okom; Ukpan
Oron	Afaha Okpo	523101	Esin Ufot; Esuk Oro; Eyo Ekung Inyang; Eyo Obiosio; Udung Esin; Udung Ulo; Udung Usotai; Udung Ekung
Oron	Eyo Abasi	523120	Akai Ikon; Udung Ekung; Udung Ekung II; Udung Osin; Udung Uko; Udung Usotai; Uko Ukwong; Uko Uyokim
Oron	Eyotong	523121	Eyo-Esang-Obisung; Eyo-Esio-Uwak; Eyo-Okpo-Oyo; Eyo-Orukra-Usuyak; Eyo-Otong-Uwe; Eyo-Oyete; Udung Obisung
Oron	Uya Oro	523118	Eyo - Atta; Eyo-Esu; Eyo-Ifang; Eyo-Odiong; Eyo-Okpo; Eyo-Uya; Udung Okwong; Udung - Uwe
Oruk-Anam	Abak /Midim	533114	Ediene Ikot Iyang; Ekot Ediene; Enuekoro; Ikot Adia; Ikot Akpakpan; Ikot Akpan; Ikot Akpan Essien; Ikot Akpan Etedue; Ikot Akpan Ntia; Ikot Akpan Otuk; Ikot Akpan Udo; Ikot Eda; Ikot Esenam; Ikot Inuen; Ikot Mbong; Ikot Obio Asan; Ikot Obio Atara; Ikot Obio-Aduak; Ikot Oko; Ikot osute; Ikot Otok; Ikot Otu; Ikot Owobo; Ikot Ukpo; Ikot Ukpong-Obiose; Ikot Uso Etok; Ikot Utiat; Manta; Offot; Otung Aya; Uikot Ukpong Eren; Ukpom; Ute Ekuk; Utu Ikot Iwara; Utu Ikot Obio Ekpe
Oruk-Anam	Ekparakwa	533113	Ediene Atai; Ediene Ikot-Ebom; Ekparakwa; Ika Annang; Ikot Akan; Ikot Akpa Osung; Ikot Akpan Eda; Ikot Eshiet; Ikot Inyang; Ikot Ntuen; Ikot Obong-Akan; Itung Ikot-Ndem; Mbon Ebre; Ukpom Edem Iyang
Oruk-Anam	Ibesit	533112	Ata Ntak; Edem idim Ibesit; Ibesit Ekoi; Ikot Afanga; Ikot Akam; Ikot Akpam; Ikot Akpan Mbure; Ikot Esikan; Ikot Essien; Ikot Offiong; Ikot Oko Etok; Ikot Okpong; Ikot udo Aduak; Ikot udo Etok; Isama; Ntak Ibesit; Nto Adua; Uruk Enung; Uruk Obong
Oruk-Anam	Ibesit Nung Ikot	533108	Anwa Udo; Eteben; Idung Ntuk Uma; Ikot Akama; Ikot Akpan Nsek; Ikot Akpan Udo; Ikot Iba; Ikot Idem; Ikot Ikpene; Ikot Ndo; Ikot Oku; Ikot Omono; Ikot Oto; Ikot Owuk; Ikot Udo Offiong; Ikot Udoro; Ikot Ukpong Obio; Itung Ekpip; Kpong; Okpotoro; Warite
Oruk-Anam	Inen	533106	Asakpa; Ekefe; Etok Inen; Etok Nkwo; Ikot Akpaya; Ikot Eduep; Ikot Ekon; Ikot Ekpuk; Ikot Ese; Ikot Eteye; Ikot Etim; Ikot Ibram; Ikot Ibritam; Ikot Ndo; Ikot Obio Idang; Ikot Offiong; Mbiaso; Nto Udo-Akpan; Oku Uruk; Okukuk
Oruk-Anam	Ndot	533111	Afaha Obo-Ikot Ito; Akapa Akpa Ewe; Ibianga; Ikot Akpa Inyang; Ikot Etim - Ibesit; Ikot Idem Udo; Ikot Ntuen; Ikot Obio Nsu; Ikot Osukpong; Ikot Ubo; Ikot Udo Idem; Ikot Ukpong Etor; Inen Abasi Atai; Inen Atan; Inen Ikot Obiom; Inen Ikot-Essien; Inen Nsai; Ito; Mbiakot; Ndo Ikot-Eda; Ndon Ikot - Umo-Iden; Ndot Usung Idim; Nto Onio-Idang; Nto Udo Akpan; Nung Oku Ubo 1; Nung Oku Ubo II; Obio Ebiet Nkanka; Obio Ibiet Esa; Obio Ndot; Uruk Otong; Usung Atiat Ubo
Oruk-Anam	Nung Ikot	533109	Eka Nung Ikot; Ikot Okoro Usung; Nung Ikot Obiodo; Nung Ikot Asanga; Nung-Ikot Urua Ekpo
Oruk-Anam	Nung Ita	533110	Ikot Akpan; Ikot Essien; Ikot Inyang; Ikot Ntuk; Ikot Obio Enin Atai; Ikot Obio Enin-Udobia; Ikot Obio Nkan; Ikot Obio Oruk; Ikot Okoro
Oruk-Anam	Obio Akpa	533107	Akpa; Ata Essien Obio; Ata Obio Akpa; Aya Obio Akpa; Ikot Eka Ide; Ikot Idiaha; Ikot Ukpong Obiokpong; Ntak Obio Akpa; Ntenge Akana; Okpokoro; Warife
Udung Uko	Afaha Okpo	523105	Edikor Eyiba; Edikor Eyobiosio; Edikor Eyokpu; Eniongo; Eye Oko; Eyo Atai; Eyo Atang; Eyo Ating-Osung; Eyo Ebieme; Eyo Esio Osung; Eyo Nsek; Eyo Okponung; Eyo Ukpe; Eyo Uliong; Eyo Ulung; Eyo Uwe; Eyobisung; Eyofin; Uboro Isong Inyang; Udung Adatang; Udung Esio; Udung Uko Town; Usung
Udung Uko	Okpo Clan	523105	Enino; Eyiba; Eyo Ating Osung; Eyo Esin; Eyo Esio Usung; Eyo Uliong; Eyo-Ating; Eyobiosio; Eyofin; Eyoko; Eyokponung; Eyokpu; Eyosio-Osung; Eyotai; Udung Otok; Udung Adatang
Udung Uko	Ubodung Clan	523106	Ekim; Ubodung
Ukanafun	Northern Afaha	533104	Abat; ADAT IFANG 533105; Akwa; Ata Essien; Ata Essien Afaha-Ntak; Ekpe; Ikot Akpan Eyo; Ikot Akpan Inyang; Ikot Akpan-Ebo; Ikot Antia; Ikot Anuwo; Ikot Arankere; Ikot Ebok; Ikot Edem Ewa; Ikot Edung; Ikot Ekpankpe; Ikot Ndot; Ikot Udo; Ikot Udo Iyak; Ikot Udo Mbang; Ikot Udo Mbang/Afaha Obo; Ikot Uram; Ikot Utiat; Ikot Wkpankpe; Ndot Ikot Akwa; Ntak Afaha Ikot; Nto Okon Ikot Enyiekop; Nto Okon Ikot Okpo; Nto Okon Ikot-Obio
Ukanafun	Northern Ukanafun	533102	Afaha Ikot Akpa Idem; Afaha Ikot Akwa; Afaha Ikot Inyang; Afaha Obo Ata Essien; Afaha Obo Ikot Uko; Afaha Odon; Idem; Ikot Akpa Ntuen; Ikot Anta Eneng-Obum; Ikot Ide; Ikot Obio Okpoho; Ikot Obio-Owo; Ikot Oku Usung; Ikot Uko Annang; Inyang; Nkek Abak; Nkek Idim; Nsekhe; Ukanafun Ikot-Ekpat; Ukanafun-Edem Inyang
Ukanafun	Southern Afaha	533103	Awat Waterside; Idung Nneke; Idung-Akpan Uko; Ikot Akai; Ikot Akpa Idem; Ikot Akpan Afaha; Ikot Andem; Ikot Awak; Ikot Dappa; Ikot Edong; Ikot Effiong; Ikot Essien; Ikot Etim; Ikot Ikang; Ikot Ikpe; Ikot Iwara; Ikot Obong; Ikot Oto-Iwuo; Ikot Owure; Ikot Udo-Ossiom; Odoro Ikot; Usung Atiat
Ukanafun	Southern Ukanafun	533101	Edem Idim; Idung Eka Uyo; Idung Idem Udo; Idung Uko Udo; Idung Urum Iso; Ikot Akpa Nkuk; Ikot Akpan Eyara; Ikot Enang; Ikot Ibekwe; Ikot Iyang Udo 1; Ikot Iyang Udo 11; Ikot Odiong; Ikot Udo Abia; Ikot Uko Obobo; Ikot Ukpong; Ikot Una; Ikot-Inyang Abia; Nkek; Nyak Zba; Obon Odor; Okoyo
Uruan	Northern Uruan	520107	Akpa Utong; Eman Uruan; Ibiaku Uruan; Ibikpe Uruan; Ifiayong Obot; Ikot Oku Uruan; Ikot Udo; Ikpa Uruan; Ita Uruan; Mbiaya Uruan; Osong Uruan; Utit Uruan
Uruan	Southern Uruan	520106	Adadi; Afaha Ikot; Akpa Mfriukim; Edik Ikpa; Ekim-Enen; Ekpene Obio; Ekpene Ukim; Eman Ukpa; Ibeno Isiet; Ibiaku Ikot Ese; Ibiaku-Issiet; Ikot Akan; Ikot Akpa-Ekang; Issiet Ekim; Isiet Inua Akpa; Ituk Mbang; Ndon Ebom; Ndon Uruan; Nung Ikono-Obio; Nung Ikono Ufok; Nung Uruan; Obio Ndobo; Oku Ikot Edung; Ufak Effiong; Use Uruan
Uruan	Uruan Central	520105	Akani Obio Uruan; Anakpa; Eman Ikot Ebo; Esuk Odu; Idu Uruan; Ifia Yong Esuk; Ifiayong Usuk/Nwaniba; Ikot Inyang Esuk; Ikot Otoinye; Mbiakong; Nna Enin; Nung Oku; Nturukpum
Urue-Offong/Oruko	Afaha	523107	Okpo; Uboro Oro
Urue-Offong/Oruko	Egughu	523112	Elei; Ibetong Nsie
Urue-Offong/Oruko	Ibighi	523109	Okuku; Oyuku Ibighi; Oyubia; Uya Oron
Urue-Offong/Oruko	Okiuso	523111	Atte; Umeme
Urue-Offong/Oruko	Ubodung	523108	Abiak Elibi; Anai Okpo; Edok; Eyetong; Eyo Eyekip; Eyo Okwong; Eyo Ufuo; Eyo Uwesong; Eyo Uya; Eyobiasang; Eyokpifie; Eyulor; Oduonim Isong Inyang; Oduonim Oro; Okossi; Ubodung; Udung Eta; Udung Okpor; Udung Uwe; Ukuda; Urue Offong Town
Urue-Offong/Oruko	Ukwong	523110	Ibetong-Eweme; Ikpe; Mbukpo-Eyo-Ima; Mbukpo-Eyokan; Mbukpo-Uko-Akai
Uyo	Etoi	520102	Ifa Atai; Ifa Ikot; Ifa Ikot Abia Ntuen; Ifa Ikot Akpan; Ifa Ikot Akpan Abia; Ifa Ikot Idang; Ifa Ikot Obong; Ifa Ikot Ubo; Ifa Ikot-Akpabio; Ifa Ikot-Okpon; Ikot Abasi Nkpo; Ikot Inyang-Idung; Itiam Etoi; Itian Ikot Ebia; Mbak Akpan Ekpenyong; Mbak Ikot Abasi; Mbak Ikot Ebo; Mbiabong Anyanya; Mbiabong Ikot Abasi; Mbiabong Ikot-Antem; Miabong Ikot; Obio Etoi; Obot Obom Etoi
Uyo	Ikono	520104	Ikot Ayan Ikono; Ikot Ebo; Ikot Eboro; Ikot Odung; Ikot Ekpeyak; Ikot Enyienge; Iton Ikono; Ikot Mbon; Ikot Odung; Ikot Obio Mkpon; Ikot Offiong; Ikot Oku Ikono; Mbiabong Ikono; Minya Ikono; Nung Asang; Nung Ukim
Uyo	Offot	520101	Afaha Offot; Aka Offot; Annua Oboo; Anua Obio Offot; Anua Offot; Atan Offot; Effiat Offot; Ekpri Nsukara; Eniong Offot; Ewet Offot; Ibiaku Offot; Iboko; Ikot Anyang; Ikot Ekpe Offot; Ikot Ntueh Offot; Ikot Oku Ido Offot; Ikot Okubo; Nsukara Offot; Obio Offot; Use Atai; Use Ikot Ebio; Use Offot; Uyo Offot
Uyo	Oku	520103	Afaha Idoro; Afaha Oku; Iba Oku; Ikot Akpan Ediene; Ikot Akpan Oku; Ikot Ebido; Ikot Ntuen-Oku; Ikot Oku; Ikot Udoro; Nduetong Oku; Nung Edong Ediene; Nung Obio Enang Idoro; Nung Udoe Ediene; Nung Uyo Idoro

== By electoral ward ==
Below is a list of polling units, including villages and schools, organised by electoral ward.

LGA	Ward	Polling Unit Name
Abak	Abak Urban 1	Village Square, Ikot Akwa Ebom; Pry Sch, Ikot Obong Ediene; Pry Sch, Ikot Oku Ubara; Village Square, Ikot Inyang Ediene; Village Square, Atai Ediene; Pry Sch Ibanang Ediene; Village Hall, Ikot Udousung; Village Square, Ikot Udousung; Village Hall, Nto Utom Ukpom; Ncss, Ikot Iyire; Village Square, Ikot Akan Adia; Village Hall, Ikot Akpan Adia; Village Hall, Ikot Onuk Ukpom; Pry Sch, Manta; Village Square, Manta Edem Idem
Abak	Abak Urban 11	Pry Sch, Ibagwa. I; Pry Sch, Ibagwa. II; Village Hall, Okon Abak; Village Hall, Ikot Afaha; Village Hall, Mbarakom; Pry Sch, Itung; Pry Sch, Abak Usung Atai
Abak	Abak Urban 111	Village Square, Ikot Etuk Udo; Village Square, Park Lane; Bishop Clarks Pry Sch; Pry Sch, Midim Waterside; Govt Technical College; Pry Sch, Oku Abak; V/H, Abak Usung Idim; Pry Sch, No 1 Abak; Convent Pry Sch
Abak	Abak Urban 1v	Pry Sch, Abak Itenge; Village Square, Obiobom; Pry Sch, Ikot Ekang; Village Square, Ikot Obong Utu; Mcss, Ikot Ebak. I; Mcss, Ikot Ebak. II; Village Square, Utu Edem Urua.; Village Square, Utu Edem Akai; Village Square, Abak Ikot
Abak	Afaha Obong 1	Pry Sch, Afaha Essang; Village Hall, Uruk Obong; Village Square, Ikot Udo Udom; Village Square, Nna Enin; Village Square, Ikot Akpakpan; Village Square, Ikot Akpan Ikpong; Village Square, Ebebit; Pry Sch, Ebebit; Primary School, Ikot Odiong; Pry Sch, Eriam; Village Square, Eriam; Village Square, Edem Anwa; Pry Sch, Edem Anwa; Village Square, Ikot Udo Obio Iwok
Abak	Afaha Obong 11	Pry Sch, Ikot Ubom; Village Hall, Ikot Inyang; Pry Sch, Ikot Ibit Ekpe; V/H, Ikot Obio Ikpa; Village Square, Ikot Obio Ikpa; Village Square, Ukana Mkpa Eyop; V/H, Ukana Mkpa Eyop; Village Square, Ikot Ufen; Pry Sch, Ikot Obong; Village Square, Ikot Obong; V/H, Ikot Akpa Edem; V/H, Ikot Akpabio. I; V/H, Ikot Akpabio. II; Pry Sch, Ikwek; Village Square, Ikwek; V/H, Ikot Ndue; Village Square, Ikot Ndue; Village Square, Ntukuk
Abak	Midim 1	Customary Court, Ikot Eshiet; V/H, Ikot Ekiduk; Village Square, Ikot Ekiduk; Pry Sch, Ikot Ikpe; V/H, Ikot Efang; Pry Sch, Nto Otong; V/H, Nto Otong; V/H, Ikot Uko; Village Square, Ikot Uko; V/H, Ikot Anyakana; Pry Sch, Atan Midim; Village Hall, Atan Midim; V/H, Ikot Edede
Abak	Midim 11	Village Square, Ikot Edong; Pry Sch, Ikot Imo; Village Square, Ikot Imo; V/H, Utu Midim; Village Square, Utu Midim; Village Square, Nto Obo 11; V/H, Nto Obo 11; King Int. Sch Nto Obo; Pry Sch, Nto Obo 1; Village Square, Ekpat Iduot; Village Square, Ikot Antuk; Village Square, Ikot Ekon; V/H, Ikot Ekon
Abak	Otoro 1	Pry Sch, Atai Otoro; V/H, Atai Otoro; V/H, Ikot Oku Mfang; Pry Sch, Abia Okpo; Css, Atai Otoro; Pry Sch, Otoro. I; V/H, Ikot Essienetok
Abak	Otoro 11	V/H, Uruk Uso; Village Square, Uruk Uso; V/H, Ikot Obioko; Village Square, Ikot Obioko. I; Village Square, Ikot Obioko. II; Pry Sch, Ikot Osom; Village Square, Ikot Osom; Pry Sch, Nko Otoro; Village Square, Nko Otoro; Mkt Square, Idoro (Uruk Uso)
Abak	Otoro 111	Village Square, Ikot Ata Udo; V/H, Ikot Odon; Pry Sch, Ikot Etukudo; Village Square, Ikot Etukudo; Village Square, Ikot Ebok I; Village Square, Ikot Ebok II; Pry Sch, Ibong Otoro; V/H, Ibong Ikot Akpan Abasi; Pry Sch, Ibiakpan. I; Pry Sch, Ibiakpan. II
Eastern Obolo	Eastern Obolo 1	Pry Sch Okoroete. I; Pry Sch Okoroete. II; Village Square, Okorete; Village Square Ojo's Okorete; Village Square Otu-Unim Ayama; Village Square Ayama; Village Square Egwile. II; Market Square Ayama
Eastern Obolo	Eastern Obolo 11	Pry Sch Okoromboho. I; Pry Sch Okoromboho. II; Village Square Okoroiti
Eastern Obolo	Eastern Obolo 111	Pry Sch Amadaka; Village Square Elile. I; Village Square Elile. II
Eastern Obolo	Eastern Obolo 1v	Town Hall Elekpon; Town Hall Akpabom; Village Square Otunene
Eastern Obolo	Eastern Obolo V	Pry Sch Emeroke; Village Square, Agba-Ama Emeroke; Town Hall Emeroke. II; Town Hall Emeremen; Village Square Okwan Obolo. I; Village Square Okwan Obolo. II
Eastern Obolo	Eastern Obolo V1	Town Hall Amauka; Village Square Ayama; Town Hall Amanglass; Town Hall Okoromobolo; Town Hall Okorommilom; Pry Sch Obianga; Pry Sch Iwofe
Eastern Obolo	Eastern Obolo V11	Pry Sch Okoroinyong; Town Hall Bethlehem; Village Square Egwenwe; Town Hall Ozuagbo; Village Square Amangbuzi
Eastern Obolo	Eastern Obolo V111	Pry Sch Iko I; Pry Sch Iko II; Pry Sch Iko III; Sec Sch Iko. I; Sec Sch Iko. II; Village Square Iko. I; Village Square Iko. II; Market Square Iko I; Market Square Iko II
Eastern Obolo	Eastern Obolo IX	Pry Sch Kampa. I; Pry Sch Kampa. II; Town Hall Ikonta. I; Town Hall Ikonta. II; Village Square Ikonta
Eastern Obolo	Eastern Obolo X	Village Square Atabrikang. I; Village Square Atabrikang. II
Eket	Urban 1	V/H, Ikot Nsidibe; V/H, Ikot Okudom; Pry Sch, Ikot Okudom; Pry Sch Ikot Abia; Pry Sch Ikot Ataku. I; Pry Sch Ikot Ataku. II
Eket	Urban 11	Town Hall Atabong. I; Town Hall Atabong. II; Pry Sch, Idua; Idua Ibughoeni I; Idua Ibughoeni II; V/H Ekpene Ukpa; V/H Idung Udofa; V/H Uqua
Eket	Urban 111	V/H Idung Uso; Usung Inyang Community Centre I; Usung Inyang Community Centre II; Pry Sch Usung Inyang; Town Hall Assang; Govt Pry Sch Ikot Ebiyan; Town Hall Etebi Idung Akpaisang; Govt Pry Sch, Ikot Ebok
Eket	Urban 1v	Town Hall Okopedi Idung Udo; Town Hall Mkpok; Pry Sch Atai Ndon. I; Pry Sch Atai Ndon. II; Town Hall Atai Ndon; Town Hall Etebi Idung Iwak; Town Hall Ekpene Afaha Eket; Govt Pry Sch Afaha Eket; Pry Sch Afaha Uqua; V/H Afaha Uqua Obokidim; Sch Of Nursing Atibe Afaha Eket; V/H, Atibe
Eket	Central 1	T/H, Idim Afia; V/H Ede Urua; V/H Ebana; Pry Sch Edeobuk; V/H, Esit Urua; Pry Sch, Esit Urua; Pry Sch, Afaha Atai; Town Hall, Afaha Atai; V/H, Iko Ekwa
Eket	Central 11	V/H, Ikot Udoma; V/H, Isenye Idua; V/H, Afia Nsit; V/H Odoro Enen; V/H, Ofriyo Idung Iniang; Pry Sch Ikot Ibiok; V/H Ntaisip Ikot Ibiok; V/H Idung Akwa Idung Ibiok; V/H Iko Eket Idung Amadu; Iko Eket Cda Sch; V/H Ikot Udota; V/H Etebi Ikot Udota; V/H Ossiok
Eket	Central 111	Pry Sch Usoekong; Town Hall Ata Idung Afaha Eket; V/H Ata Idung; Town Hall Ikot Assang; Town Hall Ikot Abasi; V/H Ikot Afaha; V/H Uda Ikot Afaha; Nursery Sch Ikot Afaha; Idung Udo Ame Zion Pry Sch; Pry Sch Idung Offiong; V/H Idung Enen, Ikot Uso Ekong; Village Square Atang Asikpe Idung Offiong; Village Square, Assang
Eket	Central 1v	V/H Ikot Odiong; Pry Sch Effoi; Health Centre Effoi; V/H Idung Akpaedim Udo; Town Hall Etebi Ikot Usoekong; V/H Idung Imo
Eket	Central V	Pry Sch Odio. I; Pry Sch Odio. II; Pry Sch Odio. III; V/H Nditia
Eket	Okon 1	V/H Ikot Abasi; Pry Sch Ikot Obioanana I; Pry Sch Ikot Obioanana II; V/H Ikot Akpaenang; Pry Sch Ikot Oso I; Pry Sch Ikot Oso II; Pry Sch Ndue Eduo; V/H Nduo Eduo
Eket	Okon 11	Town Hall Ikot Akpandem; Town Hall Ikot Inyang; V/H Ikot Obioro. I; V/H Ikot Obioro. II; Village Square Ikot Akpaikpo; Village Square Ikot Ekpokon; Village Hall, Ikot Ukpong; Village Square Ikot Obiota; V/H Ikot Ikpe; Village Square, Ikot Ukpong
Esit Eket (Uquo)	Ekpene Obo	Pry Sch Ekpene Obo; V/H Ndito Ini Idung Ikot; V/H Ndito Uto; Sec Sch Ekpene Obo; V/H Uqua Isi Edoho; Village Square Idung Awai
Esit Eket (Uquo)	Edor	Health Centre Oniok Edor; Village Square Edo Atai; V/H Oniok Edor; V/H Afaha Ikot Eyo.; Village Square Ikot Eyo. II; V/H Assan
Esit Eket (Uquo)	Ebe Ekpi	Pry Sch Ebe Ekpi; V/H Ebe Ekpi; V/H Akpa Mbiet; Pry Sch Edida Edor; Village Square Edida Edor
Esit Eket (Uquo)	Ikpa	Pry Sch Ikpa; V/H Idung Ebieno; Village Square Idung Akpausen; Technical Sch. Ikpa; V/H Idung Okpo, Ikpa
Esit Eket (Uquo)	Uquo	Pry Sch Uquo; V/H Idung Akpantuen; V/H Ndon Eyo; V/H Ndon Edim; Village Square Ebighi Anwang
Esit Eket (Uquo)	Ebighi Okpono	V/H Ebighi Okpono; V/H Idung Ntuen; V/H Ebighi Assang; Village Square Idung Unan; V/H Idung Itam
Esit Eket (Uquo)	Etebi Idung Assan	Pry Sch Idung Assan; Market Square Afana; V/H Etebi Idung Ita; Village Square Idung Ita; Village Square Idung Umoyuo
Esit Eket (Uquo)	Etebi Akwata	Market Square Mbak Uyo; V/H Etebi Mbak Uyo; V/H Mbak Uyo; Pry Sch Etebi Akwata; Pry Sch Akwata; V/H Idung Asua
Esit Eket (Uquo)	Akpautong	Pry Sch Akpautong; V/H Idung Abidiang; V/H Idung Usiong; V/H Idung Obong; Pry Sch Urua Okok; Village Hall Urua Okok
Esit Eket (Uquo)	Ntak Inyang	Pry Sch Odoro Nkit; V/H Idung Amana, Odoro Nkit; Village Square Ebighi Adaha Ukim; V/H Idung Obio Eko; V/H Afaha Ekpenedi; V/H Idung Atanga Edem; Pry Sch Ntak Inyang; Market Square Ntak Inyang
Essien Udim	Adiasim	Pry Sch, Ikot Essien Ndot; Village Square, Ikot Essien Ndot; Village Square, Utu Ekong; Village Square, Ikot Udo; Pry Sch, Adiasim Ikot Ekon; Village Square, Adiasim Atai; Village Square, Ikot Ambut; Pry Sch, Ikot Ono; Village Square, Ikot Eda; Govt. Pry Sch, Ikot Ata Enin; Village Square, Utu Ikot Ukpong
Essien Udim	Afaha	Pry Sch, Nto Nsek; Pry Sch, Urua Akpan; Village Square, Ikot Akpan Essiet; Pry Sch, Afaha Ikot Ebak; Old Market Square, Ikot Ebak; Pry Sch, Ikot Obong; Pry Sch, Ikot Esse. I; Pry Sch, Ikot Esse. II; Village Square, Ikot Obiokon; Village Square, Ikot Ukpong Offiong; Pry Sch, Nsasak; Village Square, Ikot Akpan Eka; Village Square, Ikot Ada Utor; Village Hall, Ikot Uko
Essien Udim	Ekpeyong 1	V/Hall, Ekpeyong Atai 1; V/Hall, Nto Obio Akpan; Village Square, Ikot Udo Esenowo; V/Hall, Utu Ekpeyong. I; V/Hall, Utu Ekpeyong. II; V/Hall, Uruk Obong II; Village Square, Uruk Obong II; V/Hall, Ntak Ekpeyong; V/Hall, Nto Osung; V/Hall, Ikot Inyang Udo; Pry Sch, Midim Atan; Village Square, Midim Atan; Village Square, Midim Nto Udo; Village Square, Ikot Akpan; Village Square, Ikot Ubo
Essien Udim	Ekpeyong 11	Village Square, Ikot Ossom; Village Square, Ikot Obiodok; Village Square, Ikot Ntuen; Village Square, Ikot Ansang; Village Square, Ikot Udom Mkpatak; V/Hall, Atai Essien Mkpatak; Village Square Ikot Otong; Village Square, Ikot Uba; Village Square, Ikot Udo Inyang; V/Hall, Ekpeyong Atai II; V/Hall, Ikot Esifon; Village Square, Uruk Obong 1
Essien Udim	Ikpe Annang	Pry Sch, Mbiabet Ikpe; Sec Sch Mbiabet Ikpe; Village Square, Ebe Ikpe; Pry Sch Ikot Eside; Village Square, Ikot Eside; V/Hall, Ekpene Oton; V/Hall Onion Ono; Village Square, Ekoi Ikpe; Pry Sch, Ikot Ekpe; Village Square, Ikot Abiat; General Hospital, Mbiaobong Ikpe; Village Square, Usung Idim, Mbiaobong Ikpe; V/Hall, Ikpe Nung Inyang; Village Square, Ikpe Udok; Village Square, Ikpe Ikot Akpan; Village Square, Ikpe Ikot Ntuen; Village Square, Ibam Ikpe; New Comp. Hall, Ekpene Oton
Essien Udim	Odoro Ikot 1	V/Hall, Ikot Umoessien; Pry Sch, Ikot Umoessien; Pry Sch, Ikot Ineme; Village Square, Ikot Ineme; Village Square, Ikot Ekpeyong; Village Hall, Ikot Udom Obot; V/Hall, Ukana, Ikot Ntuen; Village Square, Ekpenyong Ufum; Village Square, Ukana Mbak Ukot; Village Square, Nto Akpa Oko
Essien Udim	Odoro Ikot 11	Pry Sch, Ikot Utin; Village Square, Ikot Ibanga; Village Square, Ikot Uko; Pry Sch. Ikot Ebok; Village Square, Ikot Andem; Pry Sch, Ikot Okon; Village Suare Ikot Idem; Council Hall, Anwa Uyo/Ikot Idem; Village Square, Idung Esimuk; Pry Sch, Ikot Udu
Essien Udim	Okon	Pry Sch, Ikot Essien; Convent Sch, Ikot Essien; Village Square, Ikot Uko Etor; V/Hall, Ikot Nya; V/Hall Umon Okon; V/Hall Ikot Ocho; Village Square, Ikot Ama; V/Hall, Nto Ubiam; Village Square, Nto Okpo; Pry Sch, Ikot Oko; V/Hall, Ikot Idem Udo; V/Hall, Ifa Okon. I; V/Hall, Ifa Okon. II; Village Square, Ikot Ekefre; V/Hall, Ikot Ekpeyong; V/Hall, Ikot Igwe; V/Hall, Nyi Okon; Village Square, Ikot Udo Okure; Village Square, Ikpe Okon; Village Square, Ufuku Okon
Essien Udim	Ukana East	V/Hall, Ikot Nkwa; Village Square, Ikot Obong Edong I; Village Square, Ikot Obong Edong II; Village Square, Ukana Nsasak; Village Square, Ikot Andem; Village Square, Ikot Etan; Village Square, Ikot Akpan Inyang; Village Square, Ikot Ekon; Village Square, Ikot Akpan Efia I; Village Square, Ikot Akpan Efia II; Pry Sch, Ikot Esedomo; Village Square, Iboho; Village Square, Ikot Essien; Village Square, Ikot Akpan Essang; Village Square, Ikot Offiong; Village Square, Ikot Akpabin; Pry Sch, Ukana Una East I; Pry Sch, Ukana Uwa East II; Village Square, Ikot Eso; Pry Sch Ikot Ofok; V/Hall, Ikot Akpan Essien I; V/Hall, Ikot Akpan Essien II; V/Hall, Ikot Osom; V/Hall, Ikot Offiong Etor
Essien Udim	Ukana West 1	Village Hall, Ukana Uwa West; Pry Sch, Ikot Ukpong Etor; V/Hall, Ikot Akan; Village Square, Ikot Udo Ekrat; V/Hall, Ikot Afanga; Village Square, Ikot Otu; V/Hall, Ntak Ikot Akpan
Essien Udim	Ukana West 11	V/Hall, Ikot Edet; V/Hall, Ikot Akpan Ntia; Village Square, Ikot Ayara; V/Hall, Akpa Utong; St Aloysius Pry Sch, Akpautong; Village Square, Ikot Udo Idem; V/Hall, Onuk Nkop Ekpo; Village Square, Ikot Akpabio; Independence High Sch, Ukana Ikot Ntuen; V/Hall, Onuk Ikot Ngwo; V/Hall, Onuk Ikotosom; Pry Sch, Ukana (Okop Akama); V/Hall, Ukana Ikot Ide; Village Square, Ikot Udo Etim; Village Square, Ikot Udo Inam; Village Square, Atan Ikot Okoro; Village Square, Ukana Onuk; V/Hall, Ikot Okwo Etim
Etim Ekpo	Etim Ekpo 1	Pry Sch, Utu Nsehe; Village Square, Utu Ikot Eboro; Pry Sch, Abat Town; Village Hall, Abat Town; Pry Sch, Esa Obong; Pry Sch Ata Essien; V/Hall, Obong Ikot Akpan; Village Square, Utu Nsekhe
Etim Ekpo	Etim Ekpo 11	Pry Sch, Nkwot Ikono; Village Hall, Ikot Udo Nkwot Ikono; Village Square, Ikpe Ikot Akwa; Pry Sch, Ikot Obioma; Pry Sch, Inen Ikot Okpo; V/H, Utu Ikot Nkor; Pry Sch, Uruk Ata Ikot Isemin; Pry Sch Akakpan
Etim Ekpo	Etim Ekpo 111	V/Hall, Ikot Mboho; Sec Sch Etok Uruk Eshiet; Pry Sch, Utu Ikot Imonte; V/Hall, Utu Idung Akpan Udom; Village Square, Uruk Ata Ikot Ekpor; Pry Sch 1, Utu Ikot Ekpo; Pry Sch, Atai Nto Obo; Pry Sch 11, Utu Ikot Ekpo; Village Square, Utu Ikot Ekpo
Etim Ekpo	Etim Ekpo 1v	Village Square, Obong Utit Idim; V/Hall, Uruk Ata Ikot Akpakpan; G/Sch, Nkwot Ikot Ebo; Pry Sch, Nto Unang; Q. I. C Sch, Ikot Edet; St Joseph Sch, Ikot Edet; Village Hall Uruk Ata, Ikot Akpan; V/Hall, Nung Oku Ikot; Sec Sch, Ikot Edet
Etim Ekpo	Etim Ekpo V	Pry Sch, Nto Edet; V/Square, Uruk Ata Nsidung; Village Square, Uruk Ata Ikot Ebo; V/Square, Ikpe Atai; Village Square, Ikot Udodia; Village Square, Ikot Akpansek; V/Hall, Ikot Iyah
Etim Ekpo	Etim Ekpo V1	Sec Sch, Eka Uruk Eshiet; Pry Sch, Eka Uruk Eshiet; V/Hall, Ikot Inyang Ekpo; V/Hall, Ntak Inyang; V/Hall, Atan; U. P. E Sch, Ikot Akasor; V/Hall, Ikot Odongo; V/Hall, Atuai
Etim Ekpo	Etim Ekpo V11	Pry Sch, Omum Unyam; Pry Sch, Ibio Nung Achat; V/Hall, Omum Unyam; Pry Sch, Ibio Edem Udua; Pry Sch, Obong Ntak; Pry Sch, Obon Ebot; V/Hall, Ikot Mkporikpo; Sec Sch, Ikot Ese; V/Hall, Ibio Edem Urua
Etim Ekpo	Etim Ekpo V111	Pry Sch, Udiang Enem; Village Hall, Udiang Enem; V/Hall, Ikot Umo Ebat; V/Hall, Ikot Obioma; Pry Sch, Ikot Udobong; Pry Sch, Ikot Inung I; Pry Sch, Ikot Inung II; V/Hall, Abak Obong
Etim Ekpo	Etim Ekpo IX	Pry Sch, Uruk Atai II; Pry Sch, Ikpe Anang I; Pry Sch, Ikpe Anang II; Village Square, Ikpe Anang; V/Hall, Ndot Obong; V/Hall, Ibio Nung Iba; Village Square, Ikot Aja; Village Square, Uruk Ata 11; V/Hall, Ikot Ama
Etim Ekpo	Etim Ekpo X	Pry Sch, Iwukem Town; Sec Sch, Iwukem Town; Pry Sch, Edem Akai; V/Hall, Ikot Nya; Pry Sch, Ikot Esop; Village Square, Ikot Awak; Customary Court, Iwukem
Etinan	Etinan Urban 1	Central Sch, Etinan; Govt. Sch, Ikot Ebo; Central Sch Etinan; Federated Town Hall, Etinan; Salvation Army Sch, Ikot Ebo; John Kirk Pry Sch; Slawd Peters Technical Sch; Q. I. C Press, Etinan; Village Hall, Ikot Ebo; Bus Stop, Ikot Ebiyak; M. C. H Secretariat Rd, Etinan; Post Office, Etinan
Etinan	Etinan Urban 11	Civic Centre, Ekpene Ukpa; Pry Sch, Ikot Eba I; Pry Sch, Ikot Eba II; Central Sch, Ndon Utim; Pry Sch, Ndon Eyo 11; Adult Edu. Centre, Oto Akan; Pry Sch, Ekpene Ukpa; V/Hall, Ikot Ekpene Ukpa
Etinan	Etinan Urban 111	Customary Court, Ikot Abasi; Pry Sch, Ikot Abasi I; Pry Sch, Ikot Abasi II; Town Hall, Ikot Ekang; Village Hall, Ikot Udo Otto; Town Hall, Ikot Udo Otto I; Town Hall, Ikot Udo Otto II; Pry Sch, Ikot Ekang
Etinan	Etinan Urban 1v	Village Hall, Ikot Inyang Osom; Pry Sch, Ekpene Obom; Market Square, Ndon Eyo 1; St Theresa Sec Sch, Edem Ekpat; Leprosy Hospital Ekpene Obom
Etinan	Etinan Urban V	Hope Institute, Afaha Iman; Village Hall, Afaha Akpan Ekpo; Pry Sch, Ishiet Erong; St Martin, Ikot Udobia; Village Hall, Ikot Ikpuho; Village Hall, Ikot Akata; Pry Sch, Ikotudobia
Etinan	Southern Iman 1	Pry Sch Awa Ntong; Pry Sch, Ikot Akpan Obio; Village Hall, Ikot Afaha Urua Essien; Govt Sch, Oniong Iman; Comm Sec Sch, Ikot Itina; Village Hall, Ikot Itina; Civic Centre, Ikot Obong Ikot Inyang; Pry Sch, Ikot Inyang; Pry Sch, Nkana; Village Hall, Nkana; Village Hall, Ikot Akpan Obio Ekot
Etinan	Southern Iman 11	Pry Sch, Ikot Essien Oku; Pry Sch, Ikot Obio Eka I; Pry Sch, Ikot Obio Eka II; Town Hall, Ikot Ibok; Village Hall, Ikot Nte I; Village Hall, Ikot Nte II; Pry Sch, Ikot Mfon I; Pry Sch, Ikot Mfon II; Pry Sch, Ikot Umiangede I; Pry Sch, Ikot Umiangede II; Village Hall, Ikot Ese
Etinan	Southern Iman 111	Govt Sch, Anyam Efa; Co-Operative Hall, Anyam Efa I; Co-Operative Hall, Anyam Efa II; Sec Sch, Ata Efa; Village Hall, Akpasak Efa; Co-Operative Hall, Ata Efa; Village Hall, Ikot Nsung; Pry Sch, Akpa Ese I; Pry Sch, Akpa Ese II
Etinan	Southern Iman 1v	Village Hall, Ikot Akpan Ntebom; Pry Sch, Iwor Etor; Pry Sch, Ikot Ekot I; Pry Sch, Ikot Ekot II; Village Hall, Ikot Ekot; Tech. Sch Mbioto II; C/Sch Mbioto II Pry Sch, Efiat Mbioto I; Village Hall, Ikot Etor; Govt Sch, Ikot Etekpo; Pry Sch, Ikot Ukpong; Town Hall, Ikot Ekot; Pry Sch, Mbioto II; Pry Sch Efiat Mbioto II
Etinan	Northern Iman 1	Pry Sch, Ikot Nseyen I; Pry Sch, Ikot Nseyen II; Co-Operative Hall, Ikot Osong; Pry Sch Ikot Obio Inyang; Co-Operative Ikot Obio Inyang; Pry Sch Afaha Efiat; Pry Sch Ekom Iman I; Pry Sch Ekom Iman II; Village Hall Ekom Iman
Etinan	Northern Iman 11	Pry Sch Ikot Isong; Comm Sec Sch, Ikot Akpabio; V/Hall, Ikot Akpaya; V/Hall, Ikot Nkang; V/Hall, Ikot Esua; V/Hall, Ikot Udodia; V/Hall, Ikot Ananga; Pry Sch, Ikot Ekan; V/Hall, Mbioto I; V/Hall, Mbioto II
Ibeno	Ibeno 1	Central Sch, Upenekang; Area Office, Upenekang; Town Hall, Atasi; Village Square, Upenekang; Village Hall, Osung Nse Ule; Poly Clinic, Odoro/Okuku; Town Hall, Essien Utiaruk
Ibeno	Ibeno 11	Pry Sch, Itak Abasi; Town Hall, Ikot Inwang; Village Square, Idung Abasi Okure
Ibeno	Ibeno 111	Pry Sch, Mkpanak I; Pry Sch, Mkpanak II; Town Hall, Mkpanak I; Town Hall, Mkpanak II; Health Centre, Mkpanak
Ibeno	Ibeno 1v	Pry Sch, Iwuokpom Opolom; Town Hall, Iwuokpom Opolom; Village Hall, Akata
Ibeno	Ibeno V	Open Square, Iwokpom; Pry Sch, Iwokpom I; Pry Sch, Iwokpom II; Pry Sch, Inua Eyet Ikot I; Pry Sch, Inua Eyet Ikot II; Village Square, Inua Eyet Ikot
Ibeno	Ibeno VI	Pry Sch, Okoroutip I; Pry Sch, Okoroutip II; Village Square, Okoroutip
Ibeno	Ibeno V11	Govt. Sch, Iwoachang; Village Square, Iwoachang I; Village Square, Iwoachang II
Ibeno	Ibeno V111	Pry Sch, Nkafre; Pry Sch, Opolom; Health Centre, Opolom; Pry Sch, Atabrikang
Ibeno	Ibeno IX	Village Hall, Atia I; Village Hall, Atia II; Village Hall, Etio Esek; Town Hall, Itak Idim Ukpa; Pry Sch, Okposo I; Pry Sch, Okposo II
Ibeno	Ibeno X	Village Square, Esuk Ikim Ekeme; Village Square, Itak Afaha; Town Hall, Itak Idim Nne Ekpe; Town Hall, Esuk Ikim Akwaha; Town Hall, Ndito Eka Iba; Town Hall, Okom Ita
Ibesikpo Asutan	Ibesikpo 1	Pry Sch, Mbierebe Obio I; Pry Sch, Mbierebe Obio II; Pry Sch, Ikot Iko I; Pry Sch, Ikot Iko II; Pry Sch, Afaha Atai; Pry Sch, Afaha Etok; Pry Sch, Nung Oku; Pry Sch, Afaha Ikot Osom; Market Square, Ikot Akpan Edu; Pry Sch, Mbikpong Ikot Edim; Village Square, Mbikpong Ikot Edim (Near Bus Stop); Pry Sch, Ikot Akpan Abia; Village Square, Ikot Akpan Abia; Market Square, Afaha Ikot Obio Nkan; Pry Sch, Afaha Ikot Obio Nkan
Ibesikpo Asutan	Ibesikpo 11	Pry Sch, Nung Ette I; Pry Sch, Nung Ette II; Pry Sch, Ikot Oduot; Co-Op Hall, Ikot Oduot; Pry Sch, Ikot Okubo; Pry Sch, Ikot Ambon; Pry Sch, Owot Uta; Village Hall, Owot Uta; Village Hall, Ebere Otu; Pry Sch, Ikot Ikere; Pry Sch, Ikot Udo Ekop; Village Hall, Ikot Abasi Idem; Pry Sch, Ikot Eto
Ibesikpo Asutan	Ibesikpo 111	Village Hall, Nung Udoe; Pry Sch, Nung Udoe; Market Square, Nung Udoe; Pry Sch, Mbierebe Akpawat I; Pry Sch, Mbierebe Akpawat II; Pry Sch, Ikot Udo; Pry Sch, Ikot Essien; Village Hall, Ikot Akpa Etok; Pry Sch, Ikot Ide Akpakpan; Pry Sch, Ikot Ide Etukudo
Ibesikpo Asutan	Ibesikpo 1v	Pry Sch, Mbikpong Atai; Co-Op Hall, Ediam; Market Square, Oku Ibesikpo; Pry Sch, Ikot Okure I; Pry Sch, Ikot Okure II; Pry Sch, Ikot Obio Odongo; Village Hall, Ikot Obio Odongo; Pry Sch, Ikot Obio Offong; Village Hall, Ikot Obio Offong; Pry Sch, Edem Ibiok; Village Hall, Oku Ikot Edaha
Ibesikpo Asutan	Ibesikpo V	Pry Sch, Nung Ukana Ikot Efre; Village Hall, Nung Ukana Ikot Efre; Village Hall, Nung Ukong, Ikot Obio Akpan; Village Hall, Afaha Udo Eyop; Village Square, Afaha Ikot Eyop; Pry Sch, Itoko; Pry Sch, Abia Ukpo
Ibesikpo Asutan	Asutan 1	Pry Sch, No. 1 Akpa Utong I; Pry Sch, No. 1 Akpa Utong II; Village Square, Akpa Utong; Pry Sch, Ikot Annung; Town Hall, Ikot Annung; Sec Sch, Okop Ndua Erong; Market Square, Ikot Ukop; Pry Sch, Ikot Akpa Erong; Village Square, Ikot Akpa Ndua; Market Square, Ikot Akpa Ndua I; Market Square, Ikot Akpa Ndua II; Obo Market Square, Ikot Akpa Ndua; Village Hall, Ikot Ediom; Pry Sch, Mbak Ekpe; Village Square, Mbak Ekpe; Pry Sch, Ikot Udo Nkan
Ibesikpo Asutan	Asutan 11	Health Centre, Ikot Obio Edim; Pry Sch, Ikot Nkim; Village Square, Ikot Nkim; Village Square, Ikot Akpa; Nur Sch, Ikot Akpa; Court Hall, Ikot Iyan; Village Hall, Ikot Nko; Village Square, Ikot Nko; Pry Sch, Ikot Akpaso
Ibesikpo Asutan	Asutan 111	Village Square, Ikot Akpa Edung; Market Square, Ikot Akpa Edung; Village Square, Ikot Ebre; Pry Sch, Ikot Ebre; Market Square, Ikot Akpa Eyoho; Village Square, Ikot Akpa Eyoho I; Village Square, Ikot Udo Eyoho; Village Square, Ikot Obio Ata
Ibesikpo Asutan	Asutan 1v	Pry Sch, Ndikpo Atang; Village Square, Ndikpo Atang; Village Square, Ikot Atang Esen I; Village Square, Ikot Atang Esen II; Pry Sch, Ikot Atang Esen; Pry Sch, Ikot Itok; Town Hall, Obio Aduang; Village Square, Ikot Abasi Ebirn; Village Square, Ikot Atang Uma I; Village Square, Ikot Atang Uma II; Town Hall, Ikot Mbang; Village Square, Ikot Mbang
Ibesikpo Asutan	Asutan V	Village Square, Ikot Nkwo; Pry Sch, Ikot Osom; Village Square, Ikot Osom; Sec Sch, Ikot Obio Nko; Pry Sch, Ikot Obio Nko; Pry Sch, Ikot Akpabin; Village Square, Ikot Akpabin; Pry Sch, Ikot Oku Akpan; Village Square, Ikot Oku Akpan; Pry Sch, Ikot Enua; Village Square, Ikot Akpasia; Village Square, Ikot Ikan; Market Square, Ikot Mbride; Market Square, Ntuk Otong; Village Square, Ikot Abasi
Ibiono Ibom	Ibiono Eastern 1	Pry Sch, Use Ikot Oku; Village Hall, Ikot Nkit; Market Square, Okopedi; Village Square, Mbiam; Village Square, Ididep Usuk; Village Square, Ikot Ukobo; Pry Sch, Ikot Obong; Pry Sch, Ikot Ekwere; Village Hall, Ikot Ekwere; Pry Sch, Ikot Udo; Pry Sch, Afaha Itiat; Village Hall, Afaha Itiat; Pry Sch, Ntan Mbat; Pry Sch, Ikot Etim; Village Hall, Ikot Akpabio; Village Hall, Ikot Edok; Village Square, Etak Ikot; Village Hall, Obot Ukim
Ibiono Ibom	Ibiono Eastern 11	Village Hall, Mbiabam; S. S. S, Ikot Nko; Village Square, Ikot Udo Obuk; Pry Sch, Ikot Antia; Pry Sch, Ikot Andem; Village Square, Odoro Aka; Village Hall, Ikot Odiong; Village Square, Ikot Odiong; Village Hall, Ikot Udu; Pry Sch Okpoto; Village Hall, Ikot Akpan Abasi; Village Hall, Ikot Akpa Nya; Village Hall, Ikot Essien; Village Square, Ikot Inyang Ididep; Village Hall, Ikot Ekpot
Ibiono Ibom	Ibiono Western 1	Pry Sch, Afaha Utuat; Pry Sch, Afaha Nsai; Pry Sch, Anan; Village Hall, Idre; Village Hall, Itu Atan; Pry Sch, Ikot Ambit; Village Hall, Ikpa Ikot Ubo; Village Hall, Ndorobot; Village Hall, Ikot Mkpo; Village Hall, Ikot Obio Edep; Village Square, Obot Ukana; Village Square, Ntan Nsai; Pry Sch, Nsan; Village Hall, Ikot Andia
Ibiono Ibom	Ibiono Western 11	Village Hall, Itu Udo; Pry Sch, Ikot Usen; Village Hall, Ikot Obio Okon; Village Hall, Ikot Inyang Ekpe; Village Hall, Use Abat; Village Hall, Use Ikot Odiong; Pry Sch Use Ndon; Village Square, Usuk Use Ndon; Pry Sch, Ikot Udo Ibiono; Pry Sch, Ikot Amba; Village Hall, Ikot Akpan; Village Hall, Ikot Antono; Pry Sch Ikot Usan; Village Square, Use Atan; Village Square, Nkwa; Village Hall, Ibiaku Inyang Isong; Sec Sch, Asuk Ibiaku; Village Hall, Ikot Edet
Ibiono Ibom	Ibiono Southern 1	Pry Sch, Use Ikot Ekop; Pry Sch, Ikidip; Pry Sch, Ikot Ekop Obio; Pry Sch, Ikot Akpabio; Pry Sch, Ikot Ambang; Village Hall, Mbiaban; Pry Sch, Obio Ibiono; Tech College, Ikot Ada Idem; Village Square, Okobo; Pry Sch, Ikot Ekwere
Ibiono Ibom	Ibiono Southern 11	Lott. C. Afaha Obio Eno; Pry Sch, Ikpa Ibiono; Pry Sch, Ikpa Idaha; Pry Sch, Ikot Osukpong; Pry Sch, Ikot Efum; Pry Sch, Mbiakpan Atan; Village Hall, Nkim; Pry Sch, Mbiakpan Ikot Edim; Pry Sch, Asangting; Pry Sch, Use Nten; Pry Sch, Ibiaku Ikot Ukpong; Village Hall, Use Ibiaku Ikot Ukpong
Ibiono Ibom	Ibiono Northern 1	Village Hall, Ikot Odube; Village Square, Ikot Esifa; Village Hall, Ikot Ekpe; Village Square, Ikot Akpan; Village Square, Ikot Esen; Pry Sch, Use Ikot Amama; Pry Sch, Nta Ikut Use; Village Hall, Ekimbuk; Village Square, Ekimbuk; Village Hall, Ikot Udo Eno; Village Hall, Omu Ekene; Village Hall, Ikot Ubo Mbiabong; Village Hall, Obot Oko; Village Hall, Afua; Village Hall, Ikot Abasi Inyang; Village Square, Inwun Use; Village Square, Ikot Esidem
Ibiono Ibom	Ibiono Northern 11	Village Hall, Ikot Obom; Village Hall, Ikot Abia; Village Hall, Ikot Antia; Pry Sch, Ikot Ekoi Idoro I; Pry Sch, Ikot Ekoi Idoro II; Village Hall, Ikot Enyen; Village Hall, Ikot Ubo Ono; Village Square, Ikot Ubo Ono; Village Square, Ikot Nya Ono; Village Hall, Ikot Ifot Ono I; Village Hall, Ikot Ifot Ono II; Village Hall, Ikot Udo Ukana; Village Square, Mbuk; Village Hall, Ikot Uwa Idoro; Village Hall, Ikot Obo Afaha; Village Hall, Ikot Eto Idoro; Village Square, Ikot Udo Ukana; Village Square, Afaha Ise
Ibiono Ibom	Ibiono Central 1	Village Hall, Ibiatuk; Village Hall, Usuk Ntan Ekere; Village Hall, Udioho Ntan; Pry Sch, Ikot Aba; Village Hall, Ibiaku Ikot Oku; Village Hall, Ikot Ekpene; Village Square, Ikot Ekpene; I. C. H. S Edem Urua; Village Hall, Itu Andem; Village Hall, Ikot Edung; Village Hall, Ikot Obio Asa; Village Square, Ndon Ndem Ikot Obo; Village Hall Ikot Obio Akpan; Village Square, Ikot Iso; Village Hall, Ikot Idem Ntan; Village Hall, Ikot Ukpong
Ibiono Ibom	Ibiono Central 11	W. D. C Ikpa Ikot Uneke; Village Hall, Oko Ita; Pry Sch, Ikot Essiet; Village Hall, Ikot Ntung; Pry Sch, Itukho; Village Hall, Ikot Antia; Village Hall, Ikot Uba; Pry Sch, Ikot Inyang; Pry Sch, Ikot Ekpeyong; Pry Sch, Ikot Uneke; Village Hall, Ikot Udo Efum; Village Hall, Ikot Ukana; Pry Sch, Osuk Ntan; Village Hall, Ekpuk; Village Hall, Ikot Udom
Ibiono Ibom	Ikpanya	Village Square, Ikot Adaha; Village Square, Mbak Uno; Pry Sch, Esit Ikpanya; Village Hall, Akani Obio; Village Square, Aburu
Ika	Achan Ika	Village Square, Achan; Village Square, Ikot Osukpong; Pry Sch, Ikot Osukpong; Village Square, Ikot Antia; Village Square, Itung Achan; Village Square, Ikot Edem Inyang
Ika	Achan 11	Village Square, Ikot Okorata; Village Square, Ikot Akpan Offiong; Village Square, Nto Udoafa; Village Square, Nto Otuko; Village Square, Ikot Idiong Etor; Village Square, Ikot Udo I; Village Square, Ikot Udo II
Ika	Achan 111	Village Square, Ikot Esu; Village Square, Ikot Inyangese; Village Square, Ikot Akpa Offiong; Village Square, Ikot Idomo; Pry Sch, Ikot Akpan Okure
Ika	Ito 1	Village Square, Ito; Court Hall, Ito; Pry Sch, Ikot Inyang; Village Square, Itak Nto Usor; Village Square, Nto Urua Itak; Village Square, Ikot Ekong
Ika	Ito 11	Pry Sch, Udi; Village Square, Udi; Village Square, Ikot Osom; Pry Sch, Ikot Akpan Anwa I; Pry Sch, Ikot Akpan Anwa II; Village Square, Ikot Akpan Anwa; Village Square, Nto Udo Ette; Comp. Sec Sch Ikot Akpan Anwa
Ika	Ito 111	Pry Sch, Nto Udoenwan; Village Hall, Otomo; Village Square, Ikot Udom; Pry Sch, Ikot Ebenwang; Village Square, Ikot Otong; Village Square, Itak Ikot Onono
Ika	Odoro 1	Village Square, Nto Usoh; Village Square, Nto Akpan Etim; Village Square, Ikot Onono; Village Square, Nto Ukpong Ntia; Village Square, Nto Urua Odoro; Village Square, Ikot Inyang Odoro
Ika	Odoro 11	Pry Sch, Ikot Edim; Village Square, Ikot Etukudo; Tech. Sch, Ikot Udo; Village Square, Ikot Ikara; Village Square, Ikot Abiadok; Village Square, Ikot Essien
Ikono	Ikono Middle 1	Customary Court, Nung Ukim; Sch Of Rem. Studies, Nung Ukim; Pry Sch, Ikot Uko; Village Hall, Ikot Udom; Village Hall, Ikot Okorie; G/S Ikot Etefia; G/S Mbiafun Nkwono; Village Hall, Ndiya Etok; Village Hall, Ikot Akpaetok; Village Hall, Ikot Abia
Ikono	Ikono Middle 11	Village Hall, Asanting Ikot Efredie; Village Hall, Asanting Atan; Village Hall, Asanting Nkwono; G/S Iton Odoro; Women Dev. Centre, Itak Ikot Akpandem; Civic Centre, Oduk; Meth. Sch, Mbiok Ikot Odung I; Meth. Sch, Mbiok Ikot Odung II; Village Hall, Etok Iton; Village Hall, Itak Ikot Akpandem
Ikono	Ikono Middle 111	Council Hall, Ibiaku Ntok Okpo I; Council Hall, Ibiaku Ntok Okpo II; Market Square, Ibiaku Ntok Okpo; Village Hall, Ibiaku Ata; G/S Ibiaku Ikot Ukana; Village Hall, Ndiya Mfia; Urban Sec Sch Ibiaku Ntok Okpo; Village Square, Mbiabong Ekpene Oton I; Village Square, Mbiabong Ekpene Oton II
Ikono	Ikono Middle 1v	Unity High Sch, Mbiabong Ukan; Village Hall, Ikot Akpan Ntim; Luth Sch, Itak Ikot Akap; Village Square, Ikot Edem Udo; Village Square, Mbiabong Ikot Etefia; Village Hall, Ikot Mbiam; Pry Sch, Ibesikpo/Mbiabong; Village Hall, Mbioku Ikot Abasi; Village Square, Mbiafun Ikot Ntia; Pry Sch Mbiabong Ukan Ikot Nung
Ikono	Ikono South	Meth Sch, Ukpom Ikot Ntuen; Luth. Sch, Usung Ubom; Meth Central Sch, Ukpom Anwana; Village Hall, Ikot Akpakpan; Village Hall, Ikot Etim; Luth Sch Ukpom Anwana; Village Hall, Ikot Anwana Asanga Usung; Village Hall, Ikot Anwana Abasi; Village Hall, Ikot Udo Essien; Luth. Sch Ekpene Inuen; Comp. Sec Sch, Ukpom I; Comp. Sec Sch, Ukpom II; Luth Sch Ukpom Ita; Village Hall, Ekpene Obom Atai Essien; Village Hall, Ibakesi Ikot Edem Udo; Village Hall, Ikot Ekan; Village Hall, Ikot Omonyon; Village Hall, Nung Eduo; Luth Sch Ikot Nyoho; Village Hall, Ukpom Unya; Village Hall, Mbiabong Ikot Ntia; St Patricks' Sch, Ikot Ette Udoe
Ikono	Nkwot 1	Village Square, Okpoto; Village Square, Ikot Essien; St Mary's Sch, Ikot Nseyen I; St Mary's Sch, Ikot Nseyen II; Village Hall, Ikot Nseyen; Xtian Sch, Nung Imo; Village Square, Nung Inuen; Village Hall, Abak Oduot; Village Square, Ikot Akpan Inyang; Market Square, Ikot Udo; Village Hall, Ikot Obio Ata I; Village Hall, Ikot Obio Ata II; Village Hall, Ikot Abia; Village Hall, Ikot Idomo; Village Square, Ikot Nya; Village Square, Ikot Nkwo; Village Square, Ikot Umo
Ikono	Nkwot 11	Village Hall, Mmong; Market Square, Ikot Ette; Village Square, Ikot Umo Essien; Pry Sch, Ikot Akpa Isiak; Village Hall, Ikot Obok Idem; Pry Sch, Nkwot Nko; Market Square, Edem Edet Nung Enie; Village Square, Edem Edet Nung Eyio; Village Square, Iton Ikot Ito; Market Square, Ikot Okpo
Ikono	Ndiya/Ikot Idaha	Urua Eto Kiet Hall; Pry Sch, Ikot Idaha; Village Hall, Ibiaku Ikot Edet; Village Hall, Ikot Obio Edi; Village Hall, Ikot Enua; Village Hall, Nkara Obio I; Village Hall, Nkara Obio II; Group Sch, Ikot Akpayara; Village Hall, Ikot Akpan Ndiya; Luth Sch, Ikot Akpaedok I; Luth Sch, Ikot Akpaedok II; Meth Sch Ikot Ayan; Village Hall, Ikot Akpa Edet Ndiya; Meth. Sch Ikot Odu; Village Square, Ikot Akpa Idem; Customary Court, Ibok Ndiya; Village Hall, Ikot Akpa Ekpuk
Ikono	Ediene 1	St Joseph's Sch, Uyo Obio; Court Hall, Uyo Obio; Village Hall, Usuk Ediene; Bus Stop, Udok Atai; Village Hall, Ikot Akpan Udo; G/S, Aka Ekpeme; G/S, Uyo Afaha Nkan; Market Square, Ediene Atai; Village Hall, Afaha Ediene; Ediene Comm Sec Sch, Aka Ekpem/Ikot Ayan; Village Hall, Ikot Okubo; Village Hall, Ikot Udo Enang; Village Hall, Ikot Inyang; Village Hall, Ikot Ediene
Ikono	Ediene 11	G/S, Obio Ediene; Sec Sch, Usuk Ediene; Village Square, Ikot Antem; G/S, Edem Eyere; Village Hall, Edem Eyere; Village Square, Atan Ibianang; Village Hall, Okopedi Ibianang; Village Hall, Ekpene Ediene Ikot Ntia; Village Square, Etip Ediene; Village Square, Ikot Onwon; P. C. N Ekpene, Ediene; Village Hall Ekpene, Ediene I; Village Hall, Idoro Ediene II
Ikono	1tak	G/S, Afaha Obio Enwang; Holy Child Sch, Nung Udoe, Itak; Xtian Sch, Obio Itak; St Augustine's Sch, Ukpap Itak; Village Hall, Afaha Itak; Village Hall, Ukpap Ekpan; Village Hall, Ikot Eduek; Village Hall, Ikot Udofia; Pry Sch, Ikot Efre; Village Hall, Nung Okoro; Village Hall, Ekpemiong; Village Square, Ukpap Ikot Idang
Ikot Abasi	Ikpa Ibekwe 1	Salvation Army Pry Sch, Ibekwe; St.; Village Square, Ikot Obong
Ikot Abasi	Ikpa Ibekwe 11	Village Square, Ikot Abasi; Sec Sch, Ibekwe; St. George's Pry Sch, Ibekwe; St. Theresa's Pry Sch, Ibekwe; Village Square, Uta Ewa
Ikot Abasi	Ikpa Ibekwe 111	Pry Sch, Ikot Etetuk; Pry Sch, Ikot Ukpo Inua; Village Square, Ata Udo Usung; Village Square, Ikot Akpan-Ata
Ikot Abasi	Ukpum Ete 1	Meth. Central Sch, Ete; Village Hall, Abiaran; Pry Sch, Okpoto Ete; Village Square, Obio Akama; Village Square, Ekpuk Inang; Village Square, Essien Etuk; Village Square, Abasute Ete
Ikot Abasi	Ukpum Ete 11	Meth Pry Sch, Ikwa; Customary Court Hall, Ikot Akan; Pry Sch, Ikot Okwo; Pry Sch, Ikot Akpan Udo; Village Square, Ikot Etenge Ete; Village Square, Ikot Ataha; Pry Sch, Nda Oku
Ikot Abasi	Ukpum Okon	Village Hall, Ikot Ukpong Ekwere; Pry Sch, Obom; Village Hall, Ikot Udo Mbon; Pry Sch, Iman; Village Square, Atan; Village Square, Ikot Ata Udo; Village Square, Ikot Umiang Okon; Central Village Square, Okon
Ikot Abasi	Edemaya 1	Pry Sch, No 1 Ukan; Pry Sch, Ikot Akpan; Pry Sch, Ikot Ndien; Village Square, Ikot Oboroenyin; Village Square, Ikot Ndien; Village Square, Ataessien Ukan
Ikot Abasi	Edemaya 11	Village Hall, Ediduo; Pry Sch, Ikot Etenge Ndon; Village Hall, Ikot Iyire; Village Square, Ikot Usoide; Pry Sch, Ikot Ubo Akama; Village Square, Ikot Eyenimo
Ikot Abasi	Edemaya 111	Pry Sch, Ikot Okpok; Village Square, Ikot Efre; Pry Sch, Atan Ikpe; Village Square, Ikot Ekara; Village Square, Iboro; Village Square, Ikot Obio Akpan; Village Square, Ikot Obio Ekpe
Ikot Abasi	Ikpa Nung Asang 1	Pry Sch, Mission Rd, Essene; Village Hall, Ikot Imoh; Pry Sch, Nduk; Village Square, Essene; Village Square, Ikot Akpan Enin; Civic Centre, Owok Otu-Essene; Village Square, Ikot Essang; Village Square, Akpabom; Civic Centre, Owok Esen 111; Regina Coeli Sec Sch, Essene
Ikot Abasi	Ikpa Nung Asang 11	Village Square, Ikot Akpaidiang; Village Hall, Ikot Usop; Pry Sch, Ikot Osudu; Pry Sch, Ndak Ekom; Village Square, Ikot Obioko; Village Square, Ikot Ubo Ekpe; Village Square, Ikot Ada Udo; Village Hall, Ikot Etefia; Pry Sch, Ikot Usop
Ikot Ekpene	Ikot Ekpene 1	Ikot Ekpene, Civic Centre; Village Hall, Atta Esien; Pry Sch, Esa Attan; Govt Sch, No 1 Urban; Pry Sch, Utu Edem Usung; Village Square, Ikot Ete Utu Edem Usung; Cop/Hall, Utu Edem Usung; Village Hall, Utu Ikpe; Village Hall, Abiakpo Edem Idim; Customary Court, Ikot Udo Offiong; Town Hall Nto Umo Etok
Ikot Ekpene	Ikot Ekpene 11	Pry Sch, Old Itu Road; Civic Centre, Uruk Uso; Ideal Int. Nur. Sch; Holy Child Pry Sch, Sanni Ogun; Village Hall, Ibiakpan Akanawan; Pry Sch, Ibiakpan Nto Akan; Market Square, Ibiakpan; Village Hall, Ibiakpan Nto Obio Ekere; Fed. College Gate
Ikot Ekpene	Ikot Ekpene 111	Village Hall, Ikot Esien Abiakpo; St Anne's Pry Sch, Abiakpo Ikot Essien; Meth. Pry Sch, Abiakpo Ikot Essien; Market Square, Urua Oto; Pry Sch, Ikot Otu; Village Hall, Ikot Otu; Village Hall, Itak Ikot Udo; Town Hall, Afaha Enwang Itak Ikot Udo
Ikot Ekpene	Ikot Ekpene 1v	Village Hall, Utu Ikot Ekpeyong; Village Square, Utu Ikot Ekpeyong; Village Square, Utu Ikot Esien Ndem Ekpot; Pry Sch, Abak Oko; Village Hall, Abak Oko; Pry Sch, Nsiak; Village Hall, Nsiak
Ikot Ekpene	Ikot Ekpene V	Luth High Sch Gate; Pry Sch, Ekoi. I; Pry Sch, Ekoi. II; Pry Sch, Ikot Antia; Prison Club; Village Square, Aba Road (Sector 56); Min. Of Works Gate
Ikot Ekpene	Ikot Ekpene V1	Village Square, Nkap Ikot Obio Ebok; St Anne's Pry Sch, Ifuho; Village Square, Ifuho; Comm. Hall, Ifuho; Sec Sch, Ikot Inyang; Village Square, Ikot Inyang; Market Square, Ikot Inyang; Pry Sch, Ikot Inyang
Ikot Ekpene	Ikot Ekpene V11	Pry Sch, Ibong Ikot Akan; Village Hall, Ibong Ikot Akan; Village Square, Ibong Ikot Akan; Town Hall, Nto Udom, Ibong Ikot Akan; Village Square, Ikot Umoren, Ibong Ikot Akan; Tech Sch, Ikot Abia Idem; Town Hall, Ikot Abia Idem; Pry Sch, Ikot Abia Idem; Town Hall, Ikot Obio Okpon; Market Square, Ikot Enwang; Village Square, Ikot Enwang; Village Square, Ikot Udoe
Ikot Ekpene	Ikot Ekpene V111	Town Hall, Ikot Akpan Abia; Village Square, Ikot Akpan Abia; Pry Sch, Ikot Osurua; Market Square, Ikot Osurua; Polytecnic, Ikot Osurua; St Joseph Ma Missionary; Village Hall, Abiakpo Ntak Inyang; Town Hall, Ikot Ubo; Village Square, Ikot Ubo
Ikot Ekpene	Ikot Ekpene IX	Market Square, Nyarenyin Ntong Uno; Cop Hall, Nyarenyin Ntong Uno; Town Hall, Nyarenyin Ikot Nkpo; Open Space, Nyarenyin Ikot Nkpo; Market Square, Nyarenyin Ikot Nkpo; Ikot Obio Udom Hall; Village Square, Anwa Osom; Town Hall, Ikot Udo Osung; Village Square, Ikot Udo Osung; Village Hall, Ikot Offiong; Village Hall, Ikot Oto
Ikot Ekpene	Ikot Ekpene X	Village Hall, Abiakpo Ikot Inam; Pry Sch, Nto Obio Ekong; Village Square, Nto Obio Ekong; Anwa Uko Nto Obio Ekong; Village Hall, Ata Esien Mbiaso; Village Square, Nto Obodom; Town Hall, Ikot Esa Udo
Ikot Ekpene	Ikot Ekpene X1	Village Hall, Adatak; Town Hall, Adatak; Village Square, Ikotudo Osung Ikot Ediet; Town Hall, Ikot Ediet; Town Hall, Abak Afia; Nto Ekporo Hall, Abak Afia; Village Square, Ikot Obong Otoro; Pry Sch, Ikto Obong Otoro; Village Hall, Ikot Atasung; Comp. Sec Commercial Sch, Urua Obo; Village Square, Abiakpo Ikot Obio Nting; Pry Sch, Abiakpo Ikot Ntuen; Village Hall, Abiakpo Ikot Ntuen; Town Hall, Abiakpo Ikot Ikot Udo Oboro; Village Square, Abiakpo Ikot Ikot Udo Oboro
Ini	Ikpe 1	Pry Sch, Odoro Ikpe; Pry Sch, Oniong Ono Ikpe; Pry Sch, Usung Ita/Nsit Ikpe; Pry Sch, Ibam Obot Enen; Pry Sch, Akpayak Ikpe; Village Hall, Mbiabet Ikot Efa; Pry Sch, Ndot Ikpe; Pry Sch, Mbiabet Ikot Udo; Village Square Mbiabet Eyehedia; Village Council Hall, Ikot Otok/Otung; St Francis Sch, Mbiabet Ikot Esiyere; St James Pry Sch, Ibam Edet/Ikot Osom; Pry Sch. Nna Enin; Atan Village Hall, Ibam Edet
Ini	Ikpe 11	Pry Sch, Ikpe Ikot Nkon; Village Hall, Ikpe Ikot Nkon; Govt. Sch, Nkana/Itie Ikpe; Pry Sch, Ekoi Atan Ubom; Pry Sch, Ekoi Ikot Abia/Ikot Ofon; Village Hall, Ekoi Eden Obom; Village Hall, Ikot Udofe/Ikot Nyoho; Village Hall, Ibam Ukot; Pry Sch, Ibiono Ewuro; Village Square, Ikot Ukpong; Village Square, Ibiono Ewuro
Ini	Itu Mbonuso	Pry Sch, Ogu; Town Hall, Ogu; Pry Sch, Ikporom; Pry Sch, Nchana Ebua; Village Square, Ikot Essien; Village Square, Ikot Nta; Pry Sch, Ananamong; Govt Sch, Ebo; Sec Sch, Ebo; Village Hall, Obot Ndom; Town Hall, Mkpu; Village Square, Ebo; Town Hall, Nchana Ebua
Ini	Nkari	Pry Sch, Ikot Offrong; St Patrick Sch, Ibono Usuk; Village Hall, Ubie Nkene/Ikot Akpan; Village Hall, Ibono Okporo; Meth Sch Mbente/Obrong/Anwafia; Pry Sch, Ifa Nkari; Town Hall, Mbente
Ini	Iwerre	Town Hall, Obotme; Town Hall, Ikwueme; Village Hall, Edemurua; Village Hall, Ukpa Okon/Nturi; Pry Sch, Okpoto With Mbiabong
Ini	Ikono North 1	Pry Sch, Mbiaobong Ikot Udofia I; Pry Sch, Mbiaobong Ikot Udofia II; Village Hall, Mbiaobong Ikot Udo; Pry Sch, Mbiaobong Ikot Udo; Govt. Sch, Mbiaobong Ikot Etim; Pry. Sch, Mbiaobong Mbat; Village Square, Mbiaobong Ikot Emiang; Pry Sch, Ndiya Ikot Imo
Ini	Ikono North 11	Meth Pry Sch, Mbiakpa Ibakesi; Village Hall, Ikot Nya Mbiakpa Ibakesi; Village Square, Ikot Udo Asan/Usuk Ibakesi; Village Square, Usuk Ibakesi; Meth Sch Edem Idim Ibakesi; Village Square Edem Idim Ibakesi; Pry Sch, Nkwot Etok; Pry Sch, Asa Nting Utit Ikpe
Ini	Ikono North 111	Meth Sch, Mbiafun Ikot Abasi; Village Hall Mbiafun Ubot Oko; Village Hall, Mbiafun Eyehedia; Meth Sch, Itak Ikot Obio Ise; Village Square, Itak Edem Esa; Meth Sch, Asanting Obot Odom
Ini	Odoro Ukwok	Village Hall, Ikot Emem/Ikot Awa; Village Hall, Ikot Andem/Anwa Urua; Village Hall, Ikot Ubam/Ikot Abasi; Village Hall, Ikot Udoata/Ikot Ede; Pcn Sch, Aba Itiat; Village Hall, Ikot Idut/Ikot Inyang; Village Hall, Ibesikpo Ikot Udobia
Ini	Usuk Ukwok	Village Hall, Ikot Obio Asang/Ikot Akpan; Village Hall, Atan/Ikot Uno; Town Hall, Usuk Ntatan/Ikot Udo Eboho; Town Hall, Edem Akai/Ikot Ise; Govt Sch, Ikot Ata Udo/Ikot Ise; Village Hall, Ikot Antia/Usuk Idim; Village Square, Ikot Idem
Itu	Oku Iboku	Village Square, Ikot Abiyak; A/C Sec Comm Sch; Village Square, Ikot Adakpan; Town Hall, Ikot Eka Iko; Town Hall, Ikot Antuen; Town Hall, Ikot Esia; Town Hall, Ikot Essien; Village Square, Ikot Ntu; Village Square, Ika Oku Iboku; Village Square, Mbarakom Itu; Clerks Quarters; Hospital Road; Village Square, Odu Itu; Village Square, Edem Inyang; Village Square, Ifia Afia Isong; Village Square, Akpa Ekpene Oton
Itu	Mbiase/Ayadehe	Village Square, Ikot Ono; Village Square, Ikot Akpabio; Village Square, Ayanate; Village Square, Nya Anatang; Town Hall, Etehentem; Town Hall, Efik Ibuno; Town Hall, Ikot Offiong; Village Hall, Mkpanaruk; Village Square, Ikot Otu; Village Square, Mbiabo Edere; Ekong Settlement; Village Square, Eton Ani; Village Square, Offiong Ani; Village Square, Ikot Udo
Itu	East Itam 1	Town Hall, Odiok Itam; Town Hall, Mbiabong; Town Hall, Efi Itam; Town Hall, Ikot Anse; Town Hall, Ibiaku Ikot Obong; Pry Sch, Ibiaku Ikot Obong
Itu	East Itam 11	Pry Sch, Ekiritam. I; Pry Sch, Ekiritam. II; Village Square, Atai Ekiritam; Afe Atai Ibiatok; Pry Sch, Mbiatok I; Pry Sch, Mbiatok II; Town Hall, Uyo Itam; Town Hall, Ikot Ikono; Town Hall, Akon Itam
Itu	East Itam 111	Pry Sch, Mbak Obio; Sec Sch, Mbak Obio; Pry Sch, Ikot Andem; Town Hall, Obong Itam I; Town Hall, Obong Itam II; Village Square, Ikot Uso Akpan; Village Square, Ekim Itam; Town Hall, Ikot Ukap Itam
Itu	East Itam 1v	Co-Operative Hall, Ikot Anie; Pry Sch, Ikot Anie; Town Hall, Ema Itam; Pri. Sch. Ema Itam; Village Square, Adang; Pry Sch, Ikot Akpan; Pry Sch, Ikot Nya; Town Hall Nkim
Itu	East Itam V	Town Hall, Mkpeti; Village Square, Ikot Ayan; Pry Sch, Mbak Atai. I; Pry Sch, Mbak Atai. II; Town Hall, Enen Atai; Pry Sch, Afaha I; Village Square, Ukpon Ntiat; Village Square Okpoenyen; Village Square, Obio Obot Etim; Village Square, Atakpa
Itu	West Itam 1	Village Square, Ikot Ekang; Town Hall, Ikot Mbonde; Village Square, Ikot Ekwere; Village Square, Nwut Usiong; Village Square, Ikot Ekpuk; Village Square, Ikot Emien; Village Square, Afaha Ube
Itu	West Itam 11	Village Square, Mbiribit; Town Hall, Ikot Obio Enang; Town Hall, Ikot Abasi; Town Hall, Nung Ukot; Town Hall, Ekritam; Town Hall, Mbak II
Itu	West Itam 111	Town Hall, Ikot Ebom; Town Hall, Atai Ibiaku; Town Hall, Ikot Obong Edong; Adult Education, Ikot Obong Edong; Town Hall, Ntak Inyang; Town Hall, Afaha Itam; Town Hall, Ikot Obio Atai; Village Square, Ata Idung
Mbo	Enwang 1	Pry Sch, Uko Akpan; Village Square, Eyo Udo Mbo; Village Square, Eyo Ukut; Village Eyo Ukut
Mbo	Enwang 11	Village Square, Eyo Efai; Sec Sch, Ibete; Pry Sch, Ubotung; Village Square, Ekiebong; Village Square, Uba; Village Hall, Eyo Epe
Mbo	Ebughu 1	Pry Sch, Asak Ikang; Pry Sch Okobo Ebughu; Pry Sch Eyulor Ebughu; Utudim Village Square
Mbo	Ebughu 11	Pry Sch, Osu Ebughu; Pry Sch, Oduo Ebughu; Pry Sch, Abiakowo; Village Square, Akai Ebughu; Village Hall, Eyesin; Pry Sch, Akai Udo
Mbo	Udesi	Pry Sch, Akai Atti. I; Pry Sch, Akai Atti. II; Pry Sch, Osu Udesi; Pry Sch, Ukoitak Eyekpo; Ukoitak Eyulor; Village Hall, Ubokpo; Pry Sch, Akai Owu; Pry Sch, Isong Inyang. I; Pry Sch, Isong Inyang. II; Pry Sch, Udung Ikang; Village Square, Ubokpo; Village Hall, Isong Inyang
Mbo	Efiat 1	Pry Sch, Inua Abasi; Village Hall, Obio Iyata; Village Hall, Usuk Efiat; Village Hall, Utan Antai; Village Square, Ine Ekpo
Mbo	Efiat 11	Pry Sch, Esuk Enwang; Pry Sch, Ibuot Utan; Pry Sch, Akwa Obio Affiat; Village Hall, Mbendoro; Pry Sch, Utan Effiong; Village Hall, Ikot Ntekim
Mbo	Ibaka	Pry Sch, Ibaka; Village Hall, Idak Ikono; Village Square, Inuot Ikot; Customary Court, James Town; Village Hall, Mkpang Utong; Village Hall, Asiak Obufa
Mbo	Uda 1	Village Hall, Orukim; Pry Sch, Offi Uda; Pry Sch, Uda; Pry Sch, Uko Nteghe; Village Hall, Akprang Kprang; Village Hall, Udung Inyang
Mbo	Uda 11	Pry Sch, Unyenge; Village Hall, Utit Antai; Village Hall, Udinghi
Mkpat Enin	Ukpum Minya 1	Pry Sch, Ibot; Village Square, Ibot; Village Hall, Ikot Udo; Pry Sch, Ikot Edeghe; Village Square, Ikot Udo Edem; Village Hall, Nkirara; Co-Op Hall, Eka Nung Ukim; Village Square, Etuk Nung Ukim
Mkpat Enin	Ukpum Minya 11	Village Square, Ata Minya; Village Hall, Ata Minya; Co-Op Hall, Ikot Obong Minya; Village Hall, Ikot Ekaide. I; Village Hall, Ikot Ekaide. II; Village Hall, Ikot Ekaide. III; Pry Sch, Ikot Etefia. I; Pry Sch, Ikot Etefia. II; Village Hall, Ikot Akpan Okop; Village Square, Ikot Ekpuk; Village Hall, Ikot Abasi Minya
Mkpat Enin	Ukpum Minya 111	Pry Sch, Asong; Town Hall, Asong; Sec Sch, Asong; Co-Op Hall, Asong. I; Co-Op Hall, Asong. II; Village Square, Asong; Sec Sch, Ikot Obiokoi. I; Sec Sch, Ikot Obiokoi. II; Village Hall, Ikot Abia; Pry Sch, Ikot Abia; Village Square, Ikot Akpabio; Village Hall, Ikot Ekop
Mkpat Enin	Ukpum Minya 1v	Co-Op Hall, Mkpat Enin. I; Co-Op Hall, Mkpat Enin. II; Pry Sch, Mkpat Enin; Market Square, Mkpat Enin; Town Hall, Ikot Ekpe; Pry Sch, Ikot Obio Akwa; Town Hall, Ikot Obio Akwa; Village Hall, Nung Ukim III. I; Village Hall, Nung Ukim III. II; Village Hall, Ikot Abasi Ufon
Mkpat Enin	Ikpa Ibom 1	Pry Sch, Ikot Akata; Village Square, Ikot Obio Akai; Village Hall, Ikot Akpa Ekop; Pry Sch, Ikot Obio Itong; Pry Sch, Ikot Ayan; Village Square, Ikot Ayan; Town Hall, Ikot Edim; Village Square, Ikot Edim
Mkpat Enin	Ikpa Ibom 11	Village Hall, Ikot Osung Otuk; Village Square, Ikot Akpabio; Village Square, Ikot Ediongo; Pry Sch, Ikot Etefia I; Pry Sch, Ikot Etefia II; Village Square, Ikot Obong Ukam; T/Hall Ikot Obong Ukam; Pry Sch, Ikot Akpan Ukam
Mkpat Enin	Ikpa Ibom 111	Pry Sch, Ikot Ukwa; Village Hall, Ndon Obodom. I; Village Hall, Ndon Obodom. II; Civic Centre, Ikot Akpadem; Pry Sch, Ikot Akpadem; Pry Sch, Ekim I; Pry Sch Ekim II; Voc. Sch, Ikot Obio Ndoho; Pry Sch, Ikot Aba; Village Square, Ikot Eti; Village Square, Ikot Isighe; Pry Sch, Ikot Ekpang; Village Hall, Ibioete; Pry Sch, Ikot Inyang Okop; Village Hall, Ikot Okopodong; Village Hall, Ikot Enin; Village Hall, Ikot Oyoro
Mkpat Enin	Ikpa Ibom 1v	Town Hall, Ikot Ekong. I; Town Hall, Ikot Ekong. II; Pry Sch, Atanuk; Village Square, Atanuk; Pry Sch, Ikot Obio Ekpong; Pry Sch, Ndon Ibotio I; Pry Sch, Ndon Ibotio II; Village Square, Ata Ibotio
Mkpat Enin	Ibiaku 1	Pry Sch, Ikot Ntot; Village Square, Ikot Ntot; Pry Sch, Ikot Akpaobong; Pry Sch, Ikot Etina; Dispensary Ibekwe, Akpanya; Pry Sch, Ikot Ebak I; Pry Sch, Ikot Ebak II; Village Square, Ikot Aka; Primary Sch, Ikot Ntot
Mkpat Enin	Ibiaku 11	Pry Sch, Minya Ntak; Market Square, Nya Odiong; Pry Sch, Ikot Abia Enin; Town Hall, Ikot Ekpenyong; Pry Sch, Ikot Abasi Akpan; Village Square, Ikot Abasi Akpan; Q. I. C Pry Sch, Aka/Nung Ikono; Ame Zion Sch, Ikot Aka/Nung Ikono
Mkpat Enin	Ibiaku 111	Sec Sch, Esa Ekpo I; Sec Sch, Esa Ekpo II; Town Hall, Ibiaku Esa Ekpo; Health Centre, Ikot Idiong
Mkpat Enin	Ikpa Ikono 1	Pry Sch, Asana; Village Hall, Ibianga; Market Square, Ekpuk; Village Square, Ukpab Ekpuk; Co-Op Hall, Ikot Ekpaw; Market Square, Ikot Ekpaw; Pry Sch, Ikot Obio Nso
Mkpat Enin	Ikpa Ikono 11	Pry Sch, Ikot Esen A. Ntuen; Sec Sch, Ikot Esen Akpan Ntuen; Sec Sch, Iffe Town I; Sec Sch, Iffe Town II; Pry Sch, Ikot Unya; Health Centre, Ikot Eda; Village Hall, Ikot Mkpeye; Village Square, Ikot Abia Utok
Mkpat Enin	Ikpa Ikono 111	Pry Sch, Ikot Umiang; Pry Sch, Ikot Enyiene; Village Square, Iton; Village Hall, Ikot Affang; Village Hall, Ikot Abasi Nkan
Nsit Atai	Eastern Nsit 1	Village Square, Odot 1; Market Square, Ikot Ekong; Town Hall, Odot 11. I; Town Hall, Odot 11. II; Town Hall, Odot 111; Pry Sch, Odot 111; Market Square, Ikot Inyang; Village Square, Ikot Nyoho Edo; Town Hall, Akpang Ofop
Nsit Atai	Eastern Nsit 11	Village Square, Etobodom; Pry Sch, Iwok 1. I; Pry Sch, Iwok 1. II; Sec Sch, Iwok 1; Village Square, Iwok 11; Town Hall, Iwok 111; Pry Sch, Abasi Nsit; Town Hall, Iwok 1
Nsit Atai	Eastern Nsit 111	Town Hall, Idiaba; Town Hall, Afahabang; Village Square, Ikot Udotang; Town Hall, Ikot Udotang; Pry Sch, Ubetim; Village Square, Ubetim; Village Square, Ikot Otu; Town Hall, Ikot Ebiyan
Nsit Atai	Eastern Nsit 1v	Town Hall, Obio Akpan; Village Square, Ikot Ekong; Mkt Square, Ndon Ikot Itie Udung.; Village Square, Ndon Ikot Itie Udung I; Pry Sch Ikot Mkpo; Village Square, Ndon Ikot Itie Udung. II; Pry Sch, Ndon Umum
Nsit Atai	Eastern Nsit V	Village Square, Ikot Obong; Town Hall, Ikot Obong; Pry Sch, Ikot Itie Udung; Village Square, Ikot Itie Udung; Village Square, Ikot Idiakpa Ikot Ntuen. I; Village Square, Ikot Idiakpa Ikot Ntuen. II; Sec Sch, Ikot Asua; Pry Sch, Ikot Akpabio
Nsit Atai	Eastern Nsit V1	Pry Sch, Ikot Edebe; Village Square, Ikot Edebe; Pry Sch, Ikot Akpanike; Village Square, Ikot Akpanike; Pry Sch, Ebite; Village Square, Ndon Ekpe
Nsit Atai	Eastern Nsit V11	Village Square, Idikpa; Village Square, Ibedu; Sec Sch, Ibedu; Village Square, Ikot Abia Enye; Town Hall, Ikot Abia Ama; Village Square, Ikot Esen Nsit; Town Hall, Ibiakpan; Town Hall, Four Towns, Ikot Eket
Nsit Atai	Eastern Nsit V111	Town Hall, Unyehe Nsit; Pry Sch, Okoro Nsit I; Pry Sch, Okoro Nsit II; Pry Sch, Ikot Nkpene; Village Square, Idifa; Village Square, Ikot Ubok Udom
Nsit Atai	Eastern Nsit IX	Market Square, Adia Nsit; Town Hall, Ikot Obon; Village Square, Ndisiak; Pry Sch, Ikot Ukpong; Village Square, Ikot Ntuen; Pry Sch, Ikot Ekpot; Town Hall, Ibakang
Nsit Atai	Eastern Nsit X	Town Hall, Ikot Essien I; Town Hall, Ikot Essien II; Pry Sch, Ikot Uyo; Village Square, Afia; Village Square, Nda Nsit; Pry Sch, Nda Nsit; Village Square, Ikot Esop; Village Square, Ikot Udofia
Nsit Ibom	Asang 1	Pry Sch, Mbiokporo 1; Village Hall, Mbiokporo 1; Village Hall, Afaha Nsit; U. P. E, Nduo Eduo; Village Hall, Ikot Ntuen; Pry Sch, Afia Nsit 1; Village Square, Ikot Asat; Village Square, Akpambang/Mbiokporo 1
Nsit Ibom	Asang 11	Pry Sch, Ukat Nsit; Pry Sch, Ikot Offiok; Village Hall, Mbak Nsit; Village Square, Ikot Otong; Pry Sch, Ekpene Ikpan
Nsit Ibom	Asang 111	Market Square, Ikot Oku Nsit; Nsit District Sch, Obot Idim; Pry Sch, Ikot Ntan; Pry Sch, Okukuk; Pry Sch, Obo Atai; Village Square, Mbiakot; Village Square, Ikot Obio Edim
Nsit Ibom	Asang 1v	Comp. Sec. Sch, Obotim Ikot Ekong; Town Hall, Obotim Ikot Ekong; Village Square, Nung Ekanem, Obotim Ikot Ekong; Tech. Sec Sch, Obotim Ikot Etim; Pry Sch, Obiokpok Nsit; Court Hall, Asang; Town Hall, Ikot Offiong; Village Square, Nditung; Town Hall, Okwo Nsit; St Andrew's African Sch, Anyam
Nsit Ibom	Asang V	Village Square, Ikot Idem; Village Hall, Ikot Obok; Village Hall Oboetok; Pry Sch, Obo Etok; Central Sch, Obo Ikot Ita; Civic Centre, Obo Ikot Ita; Pry. Sch, Obo Ntong
Nsit Ibom	Mbaiso 1	Village Square, Ikot Idem; Village Hall, Ikot Obok; Village Hall Oboetok; Pry Sch, Obo Etok; Central Sch, Obo Ikot Ita; Civic Centre, Obo Ikot Ita; Pry. Sch, Obo Ntong
Nsit Ibom	Mbaiso 11	Town Hall, Afia Nsit Urua Nko; Health Centre, Afia Nsit Urua Nko; Youth Club Hall, Afia Nsit Urua Nko; Q. I. C Pry Sch, Afia Nsit/Mbiokporo 11; Pry Sch Mbiokporo 11; Comp. Sec Sch Mbiokporo 11; Village Square, Ikot Abasi Nsit
Nsit Ibom	Mbaiso 111	Comp. Sec Sch, Edebom 1; Pry Sch, Eyiesana, Edebom 1; St Sav. Pry Sch, Edebom 1; Market Square, Edebom 1; Pry Sch, Afaha Abia/Ikot Obio Asanga; Village Hall, Afaha Abia; Pry Sch, Nkwot; Village Hall, Ikot Obio Asanga
Nsit Ibom	Mbaiso 1v	Sec. Sch, Ikot Nya; Pry. Sch, Ikot Nya; Village Square, Nung Enwang/Ikot Nya; Pry Sch, Ikot Ebre; Pry Sch, Ikot Akpan; Pry Sch, Ikot Odiong; Pry Sch, Ikot Iwud
Nsit Ibom	Mbaiso V	Pry Sch, Mbiaso; Pry Sch, Afaha Ntup; Bus Stop, Afaha Nsit; College Of Education, Afaha Nsit; Town Hall, Afaha Ikot/Afaha Nsit; Govt. Sch, Afaha Ikot Ede; Village Hall, Ikot Akpa Etang
Nsit Ubium	Ibiakpan/Obotim 11	Pry Sch, Ikot Imo; Adiaha Obong, Sec Sch Ikot Imo I; Adiaha Obong, Sec Sch Ikot Imo II; Pry Sch, Ikot Akpatu; Pry Sch, Ikot Udo Ime; Sec Sch, Ukat Aran; Pry Sch, Ukat Aran; Town Hall, Ikot Ukobo; Village Square, Ikot Ukobo; Town Hall, Ikot Edikpe
Nsit Ubium	Ibiakpan Obotim 1	Pry Sch, Ikot Ekpan; Pry Sch, Ntit Oton; Pry Sch, Ikot Akpabin; Village Square, Ikot Adakop; Town Hall, Edebom 11; Pry Sch, Ikot Ekpene Udo; Sec Sch, Ikot Ekpene Udo; Town Hall, Ikot Ekpene Udo
Nsit Ubium	Itreto	Pry Sch, Atan; Pry Sch, Ikot Atan; Town Hall, Ikot Iyre; Pry Sch, Ikot Akpan 11; Health Centre, Ikot Etobo; Sec Sch, Ikot Ukobo; Village Square, Inyang Ibiakpan; Town Hall, Ikot Ede
Nsit Ubium	Ndiya	Sec Sch, Ndiya Usung Inyang; Pry Sch, Ndiya Usung Inyang; Town Hall, Ndiya Usung Inyang; Pry Sch, Afia Nsit Atai; Town Hall, Afia Nsit Atai; Pry Sch, Ikot Abasi Ufat; Pry Sch, Ikot Akpafuk; Pry Sch, Ikot Ukap I; Pry Sch, Ikot Ukap II; Sec Sch, Ikot Enwang; Pry Sch, Ikot Inyang Eti; Pry Sch, Ikot Obio Ndua; Pry Sch, Ikot Edibon I; Pry Sch, Ikot Edibon II
Nsit Ubium	Ubium North 1	Pry Sch, Ikot Eyo; Sec Sch, Ikot Eyo; Town Hall, Ikot Eyo; Village Square, Mbiekene; Sec Sch, Edem Idim Okpot; Pry Sch, Edem Idim Okpot; Town Hall, Oduatang
Nsit Ubium	Ubium North 11	Upe, Atiamkpat; Adult Education, Ikot Essen; Town Hall, Ikot Essen; Pry Sch, Ikot Okwot; Sec Sch, Ikot Okwot
Nsit Ubium	Ubium North 111	Pry Sch, Ikot Ekwere I; Pry Sch, Ikot Ekwere II; Pry Sch, Ndukpoise; Sec Sch, Ndukpoise; Pry Sch, Ikot Akpanabia I; Pry Sch, Ikot Akpanabia II
Nsit Ubium	Ubium South 1	Village Square, Uwak Ikot Ubo; Village Square Ndak Ukana, Ikot Ubo I; Ndak Ukana, Ikot Ubo II; Sal. Army Pry Sch, Ikot Ubo; Village Square Essien Ukprak, Ikot Ubo; Central Sch, Ikot Ubo; Pry Sch, Ikot Udo Iton; Pry Sch, Ekpene Ukim; Town Hall, Ukat; Town Hall, Mbak Uno; Health Centre, Ikot Udo Ime; Pry Sch, Obio Ubium; Village Square, Obio Akpa Idu
Nsit Ubium	Ubium South 11	Sec Sch, Akai Ubium; Village Hall, Edem Idim Akai; Pry Sch, Akai Ubium; Town Hall, Ikot Enwana Akai; Village Square, Ikot Akpaeno; Pry Sch, Ikot Okpudo; Village Square, Ikot Okpudo; Village Square, Ikot Akpamba; Town Hall, Ibiomin; Pry Sch, Ikot Ntung; Pry Sch, Nung Obong
Nsit Ubium	Ubium South 111	Village Hall, Odoro Atasung; Town Hall, Ikot Obio Ekit; Pry Sch, Ikot Okoro; Pry Sch, Ikot Nkor; Town Hall, Ikot Okpuyot; Town Hall, Ikot Edok
Obot Akara	Ikot Abia 1	Village Hall, Ikot Ukpong Ikot Udom; Village Hall, Mbat Esifon; Village Square, Ikot Ukpong Ikot Udo Anwa I; Village Square, Ikot Ukpong Ikot Udo Anwa II; Village Hall, Ntong Uno; Village Hall, Ikot Abia
Obot Akara	Ikot Abia 11	Village Square, Ikot Ikok; Village Hall, Ikot Obuk I; Village Hall, Ikot Obuk II; Village Square, Ikot Mboho; Village Square, Abiakpo Idiaha; Village Hall, Imama; Village Square, Nto Eton; Village Hall, Nto Eton; Village Hall, Uruk Osung; Village Hall, Abiakpo Ikot Abasi Inyang
Obot Akara	Ikot Abia 111	Village Hall, Abak Ukpom; Village Square, Obon Ukwa 1; Village Square, Obon Ukwa 11; Pry Sch, Nto Ikpang - Obon Ukwa; Village Hall, Okop; Village Hall, Ikot Oto Nto Ama; Village Hall, Ibiakpan; Village Hall, Ikot Akpa Enuek
Obot Akara	Obot Akara 1	Village Hall, Nsit Ikpe; Village Hall, Ikpe Usung Ita; Comprehensive High School Ikpe Mbak Eyop I(Village Square, Ikpe Mbak Eyop I); Comprehensive High School Ikpe Mbak Eyop II(Village Square, Ikpe Mbak Eyop II); Pry Sch, Ikpe Mbak Eyop; Village Square, Ikot Abasi Eyop; Village Hall, Uruk Uso; Village Hall, Nto Ekpu Nyanyaha
Obot Akara	Obot Akara 11	Village Hall, Abiakpo Ibo; Village Hall, Nko Nto Nkono; Village Square, Nko Nto Nkoboho; Village Hall, Nto Ekpu Ikot; Village Hall, Utu Ikot Inyang 1; Village Hall, Utu Ikot Inyang 11; Village Hall, Nto Ndang; Meth. Sec Sch, Nto Nadang; Village Square, Ikot Abia Osom
Obot Akara	Obot Akara 111	Village Hall, Oku Obom; Village Hall, Ikot Utu I; Village Hall, Ikot Utu II; Village Hall, Mkpa Uno; Pry Sch, Nto Obio Ikang; St Col. Sec Sch, Ikwen; Village Square, Ikot Akpan; Pry Sch, Ikwen Ikot Udom; Village Hall, Esa Ikwen; Village Square, Atai Ikwen; Village Square, Ikot Utin
Obot Akara	Nto Edino 1	Village Hall, Ikot Amba I; Village Hall, Ikot Amba II; Village Hall, Ikot Osom; Village Hall, Ikot Ide; Pry Sch, Ikot Mem; Village Square, Ikot Udo Nto Ide; Village Hall, Nto Ide; Village Hall, Nto Ide Anwa Effiat
Obot Akara	Nto Edino 11	Village Hall, Usaka Annang; Village Hall, Atan Ibong; Village Hall, Nto Ekpe; Village Square, Edem Idim Okpo Eto; Village Square, Okpo Eto Ikot Imo; Village Hall, Atai Essien Ikot Imo; Village Square, Ibong Uruk; Village Square, Ibong Okpo Eto; Village Hall, Ikot Eyem
Obot Akara	Nto Edino 111	Village Hall, Nto Obio Iwok; Village Hall, Nto Omum; Village Hall, Ikot Essien; Village Hall, Nto Assiak; Village Hall, Nto Edino Obot Idim; Village Hall, Ikot Idem Udo I; Village Hall, Ikot Idem Udo II
Obot Akara	Nto Edino 1v	Village Hall, Nto Esu; Village Hall, Ikot Ukana I; Village Hall, Ikot Ukana II; St. Patrick Pry Sch, Ikot Ukana; Village Hall, Abiakpo Nkap; Pry Sch, Abiakpo Nkap; Village Hall, Abiakpo Ikot Ukam; Village Hall, Ikot Okim; Village Square, Abama; Village Hall, Abama Mbak Eyop; Village Square, Abiakpo Ikot Abasi Eduo; Pry Sch, Ikot O T U
Okobo	Okopedi 1	Village Square, Mbieduo/Anua Okopedi; Central Sch, Okobo; Village Square, Akanawana; Village Square, Atipa; Market Square, Ibawa; Village Square, Ekpene Ukim; Village Square, Afaha Nsung
Okobo	Okopedi 11	Village Square, Ammamong; Co-Op Hall Ammamong Atai; St Theresa's Sch, Nsating; Village Square, Nsating Okopedi; Village Square, Atai Otope; St Patrick's Sch Ape Ammamong; Village Square Ape Ammamong
Okobo	Nung Atai/Ube 1	Mbawa Hall, Ebighi Edu; Village Square, Ebighi Edu; Village Square, Ube; Town Hall, Ube; St Simon's Sch, Ebighi; Village Square, Ebighi Okobo; Village Square, Akiba - Obo; Village Square, Nda; Village Square, Ikot Iquo/Ikot Odiong; Village Square, Ikot Osukpong/Ikot Okokon; Village Square, Ikot Antai Ema
Okobo	Nung Atai/Ube 11	St James Sch, Obufi; Co-Op Hall, Obufi; Village Square, Obufi; Village Square, Ebighi Eta; St Peter's Sch, Nung Atai Eta; Village Square, Nung Atai Eta; St Paul's Sch, Nung Udom Odobo; Meth. Sch, Nung Atai Odobo; Village Square, Atipa Odobo
Okobo	Akai/Mbukpo/Udung	Pry Sch, Mbokpu Oduobo; Village Square, Mbokpu Oduobo; Market Square, Akai Ndyo; Market Square, Afaha Akai; Village Square, Udung Ukpong; Town Hall 1, Afaha Akai. I; Town Hall 11, Afaha Akai. II
Okobo	Eweme 1	Govt. Sch, Urue Ita; St. Brigrid's Sch, Udung Afiang; Village Square, Udung Ulo; Village Square, Udung Umo; Village Square, Udung Amkpe; Govt. Sch Oyoku Asang; Village Square, Eyo Offong
Okobo	Eweme 11	Govt. Sch Eweme; Village Square, Eweme; Q. I. C Sch, Ebighi Anwa-Oro; Market Square, Isa Okiuso; Village Square, Isa Okiuso; Meth. Sch Nsie; St John's Sch, Nsie
Okobo	Offi 1	St Andrew's Sch, Oti-Oro; Govt Sch, Utine Eyekung; Village Square, Utine Nduong; Village Square, Etieke Utine Eto; St Joseph's Sch, Ebighi; Village Square, Eyo Nku; Village Square, Itak Uyati; Village Square, Itak Okiuso; Village Square, Itak Ekim
Okobo	Offi 11	Market Square, Atiabang; Village Hall, Eyobiafaha Atiabang; St Joseph's Sch, Uruting; Village Square, Osu Offi; St James' Sch, Otieke; Meth. Sch Offi; Obio Isong Afaha Osu; Village Square, Afaha Osu; Village Square, Ubak; Village Square, Eyede; Village Square, Ikono
Okobo	Ekeya	Village Square, Nung Ukana; Market Square, Nung Ukana; Convent Sch, Anua Ekeya; Market Square, Idibi Enin; Govt. Sch Ekpene Ukim; Village Square, Ufok Esuk; Village Square, Obot Inwang; Meth. Sch, Esuk Inwang; Village Square, Ekpene Ukim
Onna	Awa 1	Town Hall, Awa Iman I; Town Hall, Awa Iman II; Pry Sch, Awa Iman I; Pry Sch, Awa Iman II; Pry Sch, Awa Iman III; Village Square, Awa Nkop I; Village Square, Awa Nkop II; Village Square, Awa Ndon I; Village Square, Awa Ndon II; Town Hall, Awa Ndon I; Town Hall, Awa Ndon II; Town Hall, Afaha Ubium; Market Square, Afaha Ubium
Onna	Awa 11	Town Hall, Afaha Atai. I; Town Hall, Afaha Atai. II; Pry Sch, Ikot Edem Udo I; Pry Sch, Ikot Edem Udo II; Market Square, Ikot Edem Udo; Pry Sch, Ikot Akpan Nkpe I; Pry Sch, Ikot Akpan Nkpe II; Village Square, Ikot Nkang I; Village Square, Ikot Nkang II
Onna	Awa 111	Sec Sch, Ikot Akpan Ishiet I; Sec Sch, Ikot Akpan Ishiet II; Sec Sch, Ikot Akpan Ishiet III; Pry Sch, Ikot Akpan Ishiet I; Pry Sch, Ikot Akpan Ishiet II; Pry Sch, Ntan Ide I; Pry Sch, Ntan Ide II; Market Square, Ntan Ide; Town Hall, Ntan Ide; Town Hall, Ikot Ese Ishiet I; Town Hall, Ikot Ese Ishiet II; Village Square, Edem Idim Ishiet I; Village Square, Edem Idim Ishiet II; Town Hall, Abak Ishiet; Pry Sch, Abak Ishiet; Market Square, Abak Ishiet; Town Hall, Ikot Obong Ishiet
Onna	Awa 1v	Pry Sch, Ikot Udo Esang I; Pry Sch, Ikot Udo Esang II; Pry Sch, Atiamkpat I; Pry Sch, Atiamkpat II; Town Hall, Atiamkpat; Health Centre, Atiamkpat; Village Square, Ikot Obio Eket I; Village Square, Ikot Obio Eket II; Market Square Ikot Akpan Nkor; Village Square Ikot Akpan Nkor; Village Square Ikot Mbong; Town Hall Ikot Mbong I; Town Hall Ikot Mbong II; Pry Sch, Nung Oku Ekanem I; Pry Sch, Nung Oku Ekanem II; Town Hall, Nung Oku Ekanem I; Town Hall, Nung Oku Ekanem II
Onna	Nung Idem 1	Town Hall, Ndon Eyo I; Town Hall, Ndon Eyo II; Pry Sch, Ndon Eyo; Town Hall, Mkpok I; Town Hall, Mkpok II; Health Centre, Mkpok I; Health Centre, Mkpok II; Town Hall, Okat; Pry Sch, Okat I; Pry Sch, Okat II; Pry Sch, Okat III; Pry Sch, Okat IV
Onna	Nung Idem 11	Town Hall, Ikot Nkan I; Town Hall, Ikot Nkan II; Market Square, Ikot Nkan I; Market Square, Ikot Nkan II; Village Square, Ikot Nkan; Pry Sch, Ikot Ndua Iman I; Pry Sch, Ikot Ndua Iman II; Pry Sch, Ikot Ndua Iman III; Town Hall, Ikot Ndua Iman
Onna	Oniong East 1	Town Hall, Ikot Akpaetek I; Town Hall, Ikot Akpaetek II; Village Square, Afe-Utim Ikot Akpaetek; Health Centre, Abat; Pry Sch, Adaha Effiat I; Pry Sch, Adaha Effiat II; Pry Sch, Ikot Ntuen I; Pry Sch, Ikot Ntuen II
Onna	Oniong East 11	Pry Sch, Ikot Ebidang I; Pry Sch, Ikot Ebidang II; Pry Sch, Ikot Ebidang III; Village Square, Ikot Ebidang; Pry Sch, Ikot Ebekpo I; Pry Sch, Ikot Ebekpo II; Pry Sch, Ikot Ebekpo III; Town Hall, Ikot Annang I; Town Hall, Ikot Annang II
Onna	Oniong East 111	Pry Sch, Ikwe I; Pry Sch, Ikwe II; Pry Sch, Ikwe III; Health Centre, Ikwe; Town Hall, Ikot Mbuk; Town Hall, Otung Okpok
Onna	Oniong West 1	Pry Sch, Ikot Edor I; Pry Sch, Ikot Edor II; Sec Sch, Ikot Edor I; Sec Sch, Ikot Edor II; Town Hall, Ikot Edor I; Town Hall, Ikot Edor II; Village Square, Mkpaeto I; Village Square, Mkpaeto II; Town Hall, Ikot Eko Ibon; Village Square, Ikot Eko Ibon; Pry Sch, Ikot Eko Ibon
Onna	Oniong West 11	Pry Sch, Ukpana I; Pry Sch, Ukpana II; Town Hall, Ikot Abasi; Pry Sch, Ikot Abasi; Pry Sch, Akpabom I; Pry Sch, Akpabom II
Onna	Oniong West 111	Town Hall, Okom I; Town Hall, Okom II; Pry Sch, Ikot Ndudot I; Pry Sch, Ikot Ndudot II; Town Hall, Ikot Udo I; Town Hall, Ikot Udo II; Village Square, Ikot Udo; Sec Sch. Ikot Ebiere I; Sec Sch. Ikot Ebiere II; Sec Sch. Ikot Ebiere III
Oron	Oron Urban 1	Open Space, Idua Esit Edik; Open Space, Edik Ekpu; Park Office, Oron; Beach Market; Iyamba/Itu Street Junction
Oron	Oron Urban 11	Open Space, Akpabio Beach; Open Space, Along Meth Avenue Junction; Pry Sch, Akwa Edung; Open Space, Andiyo/Akwa Edung; Open Space, Ine Eman
Oron	Oron Urban 111	Uso Ating; Ame Zion School; Odoro Street, Opposite Open Space Africana; Iyamba/Oron Road Junction; Open Space, Calabar Street; Open Space, Ine Afa Uruting Idua; Uwe Akan/Odoro Street Junction
Oron	Oron Urban 1v	Pry Sch, Ukpata; Open Space, Opposite Village Head Comp; Open Space, Village Square Junction; Open Space, Esuk Mbiam
Oron	Oron Urban V	Meth Boys' High Sch; Bottom Garden Esuk Oron; Open Space, Esuk Mma; Open Space, Udung Okung; Open Space, Maritime Academy
Oron	Oron Urban V1	Open Space, Ntar Fish Market; Mainland Technical College; Custom House; Mary Hanney Sec Sch; Pry Sch, Uko Okwong; Open Space Former N. R. C Premises
Oron	Oron Urban V11	Convent Sch, Oron; Pry Sch, Uko Uyukim; Park Market/Court Hall; Open Space, Etim Inyang Street; Army Children Sch
Oron	Oron Urban V111	Pry Sch, Eyo Abasi I; Pry Sch, Eyo Abasi II; Mary Harney Road/Sec. Junction; Open Space, Housing Estate; Water Board; Open Space, Udung Atia, Opposite Apostolic Church; Village Hall, Udung Ekung; Fire Service Station
Oron	Oron Urban IX	Pry Sch, Iquita I; Pry Sch, Iquita II; Hospital Compound; Eyotong Lane Junction; Market Square, Eyotong; Iquita Village Hall; Open Space, Ebong Street Eyotong Village
Oron	Oron Urban X	Govt. Sch, Uya Oron I; Govt. Sch, Uya Oron II; Govt. Sch, Uya Oron III; Open Space, Toyo Estate, Uyo Oron; St Paul's Pry Sch I; Open Space Near Madam Affiong Umo's Compound
Oruk Anam	Ikot Ibritam 1	Pry Sch, Ikot Ibritam; Village Square, Oku Uruk; Pry Sch, Akpaya; Village Square, Etok Nkwo; Village Square, Ikot Ekon; Village Square, Ikot Ndo; Village Hall, Ikot Eduep; Town Hall, Ikot Eteye; Village Square, Ikot Ekpuk I; Village Square, Ikot Ekpuk II; Town Hall, Ikot Ekpuk; Village Suare, Ikot Asakpa; Sec. Sch. Ikot Ekefe; Village Hall Etok Inen; Town Hall, Ikot Effiong
Oruk Anam	Ikot Ibritam 11	Village Hall, Ikot Esse; Village Square, Ikot Obio Idang; Village Square, Ikot Etim; Town Hall, Mbiaso; Pry Sch, Ikot Ntuk; Pry Sch, Ikot Inyang; Village Hall, Ikot Obio Uruk; Village Square, Ikot Essien; Village Square, Ikot Obio Enin Ata; Village Hall, Ikot Obio Enin Udobia; Town Hall, Okukuk
Oruk Anam	Ndot/Ikot Okoro 1	Pry Sch, Nung Oku Ubo 11; Pry Sch, Inen Abasi Atai; Village Square, Ndot Usung Idim; Town Hall, Ndot Ikot Obiom; Town Hall, Nung Oku Ibiet
Oruk Anam	Ndot/Ikot Okoro 11	Village Hall, Inen Ikot Essien; Village Square, Inen Nsai; Village Hall, Inen Atan; Village Square, Ndot Ikot Eda; Village Hall, Ikot Idem Udo; Village Square, Ikot Ukpong Etor; Pry Sch, Ikot Udo; Village Hall, Ikot Akpa Inyang; Sec Sch, Mbiakot; Town Hall, Ibianga; Village Hall, Uruk Otong; Pry Sch, Ikot Osukpong; Pry Sch, Obio Ibiet Esa; Village Square, Afaha Obio Iton; Village Hall, Ikot Obio Nsu; Village Hall, Usung Atiat Ubo; Village Square, Obio Ibiet Nkarika; Village Square, Nung Oku Ubo; Pry Sch, Obio Ndot I; Pry Sch, Obio Ndot II; Village Hall, Obio Ndot; Pry Sch, Ikpe Akpa Ewe; Village Hall, Ikot Udo Idem; Village Hall, Ikot Obio Nkan
Oruk Anam	Ndot/Ikot Okoro 111	Pry Sch, Nung Ikot Obiodo; Pry Sch, Eka Nung Ikot; Village Square, Nung Ikot Okuruk; Health Centre, Nung Ikot Asanga; Pry Sch, Ntak Obio Akpa; Village Hall, Ikot Idiaha; Village Hall, Aya Obio Akpa; Village Square, Ntenge Akana; Pry Sch, Ata Essien Obio Akpa; Village Hall, Ikot Eka Ideh; Pry Sch, Ikot Okoro; Village Square, Nto Obio/Ikot Akpan; Village Hall, Ata Obio Akpa; Village Square Nung Ikot Urua Ekpo
Oruk Anam	Ibesit	Village Square, Ikot Afanga; Village Square, Ikot Essien; Pry Sch, Isama; Pry Sch, Ntak Ibesit; Village Square, Ikot Akam; Village Hall, Ikot Etim Ibesit; Village Hall, Uruk Obong; Pry Sch, Edem Idim Ibesit; Village Square, Uruk Enung; Village Square, Ikot Offiong; Village Square, Ndon Ikot Imoiden; Pry Sch, Ikot Okpong; Village Hall, Ikot Akpan; Village Hall, Ikot Akpan Mbure; Village Hall, Nto Adua; Village Square, Ikot Esikan; Ikot Oko Etok Junction; Village Hall, Ikot Udo Aduak; Pry Sch, Ibesit Ekoi; Village Hall, Ikot Ntuen; Village Square, Ata Ntak
Oruk Anam	Ekparakwa	Pry Sch, Ukpom Edem Inyang I; Pry Sch, Ukpom Edem Inyang II; Pry Sch, Ekparakwa; Village Square, Ekparakwa; Village Square, Ediene Ikot Ebom; Village Square, Itung Ikot Ndem; Pry Sch, Ika Annang; Pry Sch, Mbon Ebre; Village Square, Ikot Akam; Town Hall, Ikot Ntuen; Civic Centre, Ikot Ntuen; Pry Sch, Ikot Akpan Eda; Pry Sch, Ikot Inyang; Village Square, Ediene Atai; Village Square, Ikot Eshiet; Pry Sch, Ikot Obong Akan; Village Square, Ikot Akpa Usung
Oruk Anam	Abak Midim 1	Pry Sch, Ikot Ukpong Eren; Village Square, Ikot Mbong; Village Square, Utu Ikot Iwara; Village Hall, Ikot Akpan Eteduo; Village Hall, Ikot Akpan Ntia; Sec Sch, Ikot Owobo; Village Square, Ikot Ukpo; Town Hall, Ikot Otok; Village Square, Otung Aya
Oruk Anam	Abak Midim 11	Pry Sch, Ikot Akpan Essien; Village Square, Ikot Obio Aduak; Village Square, Ikot Akpan Otuk; Pry Sch, Utu Ikot Obio Ekpe; Village Square, Ikot Adia; Village Square, Etok Ediene; Pry Sch, Eka Ediene; Village Hall, Ikot Uso Etok; Village Square, Ikot Obong
Oruk Anam	Abak Midim 111	Pry Sch, Ikot Esenam; Village Hall, Ikot Esenam; Sec Sch, Ikot Esenam; Village Square, Manta; Village Square, Ikot Obiosan; Pry Sch, Ikot Akpakpan; Pry Sch, Ikot Inuen; Town Hall, Offot; Village Square, Ediene Ikot Inyang; Pry Sch, Ukpom; Civic Centre, Ikot Esenam
Oruk Anam	Abak Midim 1v	Pry Sch, Ikot Osute; Village Hall, Ikot Eda; Village Square, Ikot Oko; Village Hall, Ikot Otu; Pry Sch, Ikot Ukpong Obio Ese; Pry Sch, Ikot Akpan Udo; Town Hall, Ikot Utiat; Village Square, Ute Etok; Village Square, Ikot Inuek; Village Square, Ikot Obio Atara
Oruk Anam	Ibesit/Nung Ikot 1	Pry Sch, Ibesit Okpokoro; Pry Sch, Anwa Udo; Pry Sch, Ibesit Anwa; Village Hall, Odung Ntuk Uma; Village Square, Ikot Oku; Pry Sch, Ikot Ikpene; Pry Sch, Ikot Udoro; Village Hall, Itung Ekpip; Town Hall, Ikot Akama; Pry Sch, Eteben; Village Square, Ikot Ukpong Obio; Village Square, Ikot Idem; Village Square, Ikot Udo Aduak
Oruk Anam	Ibesit/Nung Ikot 11	Town Hall, Ikot Udoffiong; Village Square, Ikot Omono; Village Square, Ikot Owok; Village Square, Ikot Oto; Town Hall, Ikot Akpan Udo; Pry Sch, Ikot Akpan Nsek; Village Square, Ikot Udo; Pry Sch, Wariffe; Pry Sch, Ikot Iba; Village Hall Atado Ntak; Village Square, Ikot Udoffiong
Udung Uko	Udung Uko 1	Village Hall, Udung Otok; Village Hall, Eyonsek; Village Hall, Udung Esio; Village Square, Eniongo; Market Square, Eyo Uliong
Udung Uko	Udung Uko 11	Village Hall, Eyofin; Village Hall, Eyo Ukpe; Market Square, Eyobieme; Village Square, Eyo Uwe
Udung Uko	Udung Uko 111	Village Square, Eyosio Osung; Village Hall, Eyokor Osung; Village Square, Eyo Ating I; Village Square, Eyo Ating II; Village Hall, Eyo Bisung; Village Hall, Eyo Enammi
Udung Uko	Udung Uko 1v	Health Centre, Eyokponung; Village Square, Eyokponung; Village Square, Udung Adatang; Village Square, Usung Udung Uko
Udung Uko	Udung Uko V	Pry Sch, Eyotai I; Pry Sch, Eyotai II; Pry Sch, Eyotai III; Village Square, Eyotai; Village Hall, Udung Osung Udoh
Udung Uko	Udung Uko V1	Pry Sch, Uboro Isong. Inyang; Pry Sch, Eyo Uwe; Village Square, Eyo Ukpe; Village Square, Eyokpo Abasi; Village Square, Eyonimino/Eyo Osung Uye
Udung Uko	Udung Uko V11	Pry Sch, Uboro Isong. Inyang; Pry Sch, Eyo Uwe; Village Square, Eyo Ukpe; Village Square, Eyokpo Abasi; Village Square, Eyonimino/Eyo Osung Uye
Udung Uko	Udung Uko V111	Pry Sch, Eyokpu Edikor I; Pry Sch, Eyokpu Edikor II; Pry Sch, Eyokpu Edikor III; Village Square, Eyokpu Edikor
Udung Uko	Udung Uko IX	Market Square, Eyobiosio Edikor I; Market Square, Eyobiosio Edikor II; Village Square, Eyobiosio Edikor
Udung Uko	Udung Uko X	Pry Sch, Ekim I; Pry Sch, Ekim II; Village Square, Odueti Ekim; Market Square, Ekim; Village Square, Utumong Ekim I; Village Square, Utumong Ekim II
Ukanafun	Ukanafun Urban	Q. I. C Pry Sch, Ikot Akpa Nkuk; Wasco, Ikot Akpa Nkuk; C. P. S, Ikot Inyang Abia; G/P/S, Ikot Udo Obobo; Village Square, Ikot Udo Obobo; G/S, Idung Eka Uyo; St Theresa's Pry Sch, Ikot Akpaneyara; Village Square, Idung Idem Udo
Ukanafun	Southern Ukanafun 1	Pry Sch, Ikot Odiong; Village Square, Ikot Ukpong; G/P/S Idung Uko Udo; G/P/S Ikot Enang; G/P/S Edem Idim; G/P/S Ikot Inyang Udo; Village Square, Obon Odor/Idung Urom; C/S, Ohaobu
Ukanafun	Southern Ukanafun 11	Pry Sch, Nkek; Sec Sch, Nkek; G/P/S Nkek Enen Ido; Village Square, Nyak Ibah; G/P/S Ikot Udobia; G/P/S, Okoyo 1 & 11; Q. I. C Okoyo Town Sch; G/S, Ikot Ibekwe; Village Square, Ikot Ibekwe; G/S, Ikot Unnah; Village Square, Ikot Unnah
Ukanafun	Northern Ukanafun 1	Court Hall, Nkek Idim; Village Hall, Nkek Idim; G/P/S, Ikot Oku Usung I; G/P/S, Ikot Oku Usung II; Village Square, Ikot Oku Usung; G/S, Ikot Anta; Village Square, Ikot Anta; G/P/S, Ikot Uko Annang I; G/P/S, Ikot Uko Annang II; G/P/S, Ikot Akpa Ntuen I; G/P/S, Ikot Akpa Ntuen II; G/P/S, Ikot Obio Okpoho; Govt. Pry Sch Ikot Ide; Bus Stop Urua Offiong
Ukanafun	Northern Ukanafun 11	Pry Sch, Nsekhe I; Pry Sch, Nsekhe II; Village Hall, Ukanafun Ikot Ekpat; Village Square, Ikot Obiowo; Pry Sch, Ukanafun Edem Inyang I; Pry Sch, Ukanafun Edem Inyang II; Pry Sch, Nkek Abak I; Pry Sch, Nkek Abak II
Ukanafun	Northern Afaha 1	Pry Sch, Afaha Obo Ata Essien; Village Square, Afaha Obo Ata Ikot Udo; Village Square, Afaha Ikot Akwa; C/Centre, Afaha Ikot Inyang; Village Square, Afaha Ikot Inyang; Village Square, Afaha Odon; Village Square, Afaha Ikot Akpa Idem
Ukanafun	Northern Afaha 11	G/S Ata Essien Ntak, Ikot Okume; Cath Sch, Ikot Ekperikpe I; Cath Sch, Ikot Ekperikpe II; Village Square, Ntak Afaha Ikot Akwa; Village Square, Ikot Uttiat; Village Square, Ikot Edung; Govt School, Nto Okon Ikot Obioekpe; Village Square, Ikot Anuwo; Village Square, Nto Okon Ikot Enyiekop; Village Square, Ikot Udo Mbang; St Francis Cath Sch, Nto Okon/Ikot Okpo
Ukanafun	Southern Afaha, Adat Ifang 1	Village Square, Ikot Andem; Village Square, Edong; G/S Ikot Etim; G/S Ikot Akai; Pry Sch, Ikot Akpan Afaha; Pry Sch, Idung Nneke; Pry Sch, Ikot Essien; Pry Sch Ikot Akpa Idem; Village Square, Ikot Akpa Idem; Village Square, Usung Attiat
Ukanafun	Southern Afaha, Adat Ifang 11	Village Square, Ata Essien; Village Square, Ikot Edem Awa; Village Square, Ikot Udo; Pry Sch, Ikot Arankere; Village Hall, Ikot Arankere; Village Square, Ikot Ndot; Village Square, Ikot Ebok; Village Square, Ndot Ikot Akwa; Village Square, Ikot Antia
Ukanafun	Southern Afaha, Adat Ifang 111	Village Square, Ikot Urom; Village Square, Ikot Udo Iyak; Village Square, Ikot Akpan Inyang; Village Square, Ikot Akpan Ebo; Village Square, Ikot Udo Mbang Afaha Obo/Abat; Village Square, Ikot Akpan Eyo
Ukanafun	Southern Afaha, Adat Ifang 1v	Village Square, B/W Odoro Ikot/Afaha Idung Akpan Uko; G/P/S Ikot Effiong 1; G/P/S Ikot Effiong 11; G/P/S Ikot Udo Ossiom; Village Square Ikot Otor Iwuo/Ikot Ikpe; Village Square Ikot Obong/Ikot Iwara; Village Square Ikot Owure/Ikot Awak
Uruan	Central Uruan I	St Joseph's Pry Sch, Idu I; St Joseph's Pry Sch, Idu II; Motor Park, Idu; St Maurice Eman Ikot Ebo I; St Maurice Eman Ikot Ebo II; Holy Trinity Pry Sch, Mbiakong I; Holy Trinity Pry Sch, Mbiakong II; Village Square, Mbiakong
Uruan	Central Uruan II	St Patrick Pry Sch, Ifiayong Esuk I; Holy Child Pry Sch, Ifiayong Esuk II; Pry Sch, Nwaniba; Pry Sch, Akani Obio Uruan I; Pry Sch, Akani Obio Uruan II; Village Square, Akpa Mfri Ukim; Village Square, Ufak Effiong; Pry Sch, Edik Ikpa; Village Hall, Edik Ikpa
Uruan	Central Uruan III	Pry Sch, Nung Oku I; Pry Sch, Nung Oku II; Pry Sch, Ikot Otinye; Essien Street Square, Ikot Otinye; Village Square, Ikot Otinye; Pry Sch, Ikot Inyang Esuk; Village Square, Ikot Inyang Esuk; Village Square, Anakpa; Village Square, Nna Enin; Pry Sch, Ntrukpum; Village Square, Esuk Odu
Uruan	Northern Uruan 1	Pry Sch, Ikot Udo I; Pry Sch, Ikot Udo II; Pry Sch, Ikpa Uruan; Pry Sch, Ibikpe Uruan; Village Square, Ita Uruan; Pry Sch, Ita Uruan; Pry Sch, Osong; Sec Sch, Mbiaya I; Sec Sch, Mbiaya II; Pry Sch, Mbiaya I; Pry Sch, Mbiaya II; Town Hall, Mbiaya
Uruan	Northern Uruan 11	Pry Sch, No. I Ibiaku Uruan I; Pry Sch, No. II Ibiaku Uruan II; Sec Sch, Ibiaku Uruan; Pry Sch, Utit Uruan; Village Square, Eman Uruan; Pry Sch, Eman Uruan I; Pry Sch, Eman Uruan II; Pry Sch, Akpa Utong; Pry Sch, Ikot Oku; Pry Sch, Ifiayong Obot
Uruan	Southern Uruan 1	Pry Sch, Ibiaku Ikot Ese; Pry Sch, Ikot Edung; Pry Sch, Nung Ikono Obio; Town Hall, Nung Ikono Obio; Pry Sch, Ikot Akan; Pry Sch, Ikot Akpa Ekang; Pry Sch, Ekpene Ibia I; Pry Sch, Ekpene Ibia II
Uruan	Southern Uruan 11	Pry Sch, Eman Ukpa; Village Square, Eman Ukpa; Pry Sch, Ekim Enen; Village Square, Ekim Enen; Village Square, Afaha Ikot; Village Square, Isiet Inuakpa; Village Square, Ibuno Isiet I; Village Square, Ibuno Isiet II
Uruan	Southern Uruan 111	Pry Sch, Adadia I; Pry Sch, Adadia II; Pry Sch, Adadia III; Market Square, Adadia; Pry Sch, Issiet Ekim I; Pry Sch, Issiet Ekim II; Issiet Ekim Beach; Pry Sch, Use Uruan I; Pry Sch, Use Uruan II
Uruan	Southern Uruan IV	Pry Sch, Nung Ikono Ufok; Village Square, Nung Ikono Ufok; Village Square, Nung Abia; Pry Sch, Ituk Mbang I; Pry Sch, Ituk Mabang II; Opp Hospital, Ituk Mbang
Uruan	Southern Uruan V	Pry Sch, Ekpene Ukim; Market Square, Ekpene Ukim; Sec Sch, Ekpene Ukim; Pry Sch, Obio Ndobo; Pry Sch, Ibiaku Issiet; Town Hall, Ibiaku Issiet; Pry Sch, Ndon Uruan
Uruan	Southern Uruan V1	Pry Sch, Ndon Ebom; Pry Sch, No. 1 Ndon Ebom; Itu Square Nkime Nta; Village Hall, Ikot Ebok; Village Hall, Ikot Akpaunam; Village Hall, Ikot Nkimenta; Village Square, Ikot Ntia
Urue Offong/Oruko	Urue Offong 1	Pry Sch, Oyoku Ibighi; Village Hall, Udungabang; Pry Sch, Mbokpu Eyoima; Pry Sch, Ukuko; Village Hall, Elei; Community Sec. Sch, Ukuko
Urue Offong/Oruko	Urue Offong 11	Village Hall, Urue Offong; Pry Sch, Uboro-Oro; Village Hall, Umume; Village Hall, Uboro-Oro
Urue Offong/Oruko	Urue Offong 111	Village Hall, Ibotong Nsie; Pry Sch, Oyubia; Sec Sch, Oyubia; Village Hall, Oyubia; Village Square Eyo Ntuen; Village Square, Eyo Ebiekpi; Village Square, Ibotong Eweme
Urue Offong/Oruko	Urue Offong 1v	Sec Sch, Mbokpu Eyokan; Pry Sch, Mbokpu Eyokan; Village Hall, Eyoabang; Pry Sch, Ikpe; Village Hall, Ikpe
Urue Offong/Oruko	Urue Offong V	Pry Sch, Okossi; Sec Sch, Okossi; Village Hall, Atte; Village Hall, Udung Anwana
Urue Offong/Oruko	Oruko 1	Pry Sch, Mbokpu Ukoakai; Village Hall, Mbokpu Ukoakai; Village Hall, Eyo Akwaha; Village Hall, Eyoeyekip; Village Hall, Eyo - Okwong
Urue Offong/Oruko	Oruko 11	Village Hall, Eyufuo; Village Hall, Edok; Village Hall, Udung Etta; Village Hall, Eyo Kpifie
Urue Offong/Oruko	Oruko 111	Village Hall, Eyo-Uwesong; Pry Sch, Oduonim - Oro; Village Hall, Oduonim Isong Inyang; Pry Sch, Eyo Biasang
Urue Offong/Oruko	Oruko 1v	Pry Sch, Eyulor; Pry Sch, Ukuda; Pry Sch, Abiak Elibi; Village Hall, Eyo-Usoyo; Village Hall, Anai Okpo
Urue Offong/Oruko	Oruko V	Pry Sch, Udung-Uwe; Village Hall, Udung Ukpor; Pry Sch, Ubodung
Uyo	Etoi 11	Pry Sch, Ifa Atai I; Pry Sch, Ifa Atai II; Coop Hall, Ifa Ikot Idang; Village Square, Ifa Ikot Idang; Coop Hall, Ifa Ikot Akpan; Pry Sch, Mbak Ikot Ebo; Market Square, Mbak Akpan Ekpeyong; Pry Sch, Mbak Ikot Abasi; Pry Sch, Obot Obom; Pry Sch, Ikot Inyang Idung; Village Square, Ifa Ikot Abia Ntuen; Pry Sch, Ifa Ikot Obong I; Pry Sch, Ifa Ikot Obong II; Village Hall, Ikot Akpabio; Village Hall, Ifa Ikot Abia Mkpo
Uyo	Offot 1	Pry Sch, Atan Offot; Village Hall, Atan Offot; Village Hall, Aka Offot (Idakeyop); Village Hall, Iboko Offot (Abak Rd); Village Hall, Effiat Offot; Market Square, Ikot Ekpe Offot; Market Square, Ikot Okubo Offot; Village Hall, Ikot Okubo Offot; Sec Sch, Ikot Okubo Offot; Pry Sch, Afaha Offot; Sec Sch, Obio Offot; St Mary's Pry Sch, Obio Offot; Village Square, Atai Obio, Obio Offot; Village Square, Anua Obio, Obio Offot; Village Hall, Use Ikot Ebio
Uyo	Offot 11	Village Square, Ewet Offot; Adiaha Obong Sec Sch; Pry Sch, Eniong Offot; Pry Sch, Anua Offot; Village Square, Anua Offot; Village Hall, Ekpri Nsukara; Village Square, Ekpri Nsukara; Pry Sch, Nsukara Offot; Village Hall, Ibiaku Offot; Village Hall, Ikot Ntuen Offot; Village Square, Ikot Oku Idio; C/Square, Ikot Anyan Offot; Pry Sch, Use Offot; St Luke's Hospital, Anua
Uyo	Ikono 1	Village Hall, Ikot Ebor; Pry Sch, Iton Ikono I; Pry Sch, Iton Ikono II; Sec Sch Ikot Odung; Pry Sch, Ikot Obio Mkpong; Pry Sch, Ikot Mbon; Village Square, Ikot Mbon (Akara Anwa); Village Hall, Nung Ukim; Pry Sch, Mbiabong Ikono; Open Space Church Of Christ, Mbiabong Ikono; Pry Sch, Ikot Oku Ikono; Village Hall, Ikot Oku Ikono; Sec Sch, Ikot Ayan
Uyo	Ikono 11	Pry Sch, Ikot Ekpeyak I; Pry Sch, Ikot Ekpeyak II; Pry Sch, Ikot Ofon; Village Hall, Ikot Ofon; Pry Sch, Ikot Ebo; Village Hall, Minya; Pry Sch, Anan Ikono; Pry Sch, Nung Asang; Pry Sch, Ikot Nsung; Market Square, Ikot Offiong; Pry Sch, Ikot Enyienge; Village Hall, Ikot Enyienge
Uyo	Oku 1	Health Centre, Afaha Idoro; Village Hall, Afaha Idoro; Village Hall, Nung Uyo Idoro; Open Space Opp. Xtian Assembly Church, Nung Obio Enang; Cath Nur Sch, Nung Ediene I; Cath Nur Sch, Nung Ediene II; Open Space Opp Chief's Compd, Ikot Akpan Ediene; Pry Sch, Nung Udoe Ediene; Village Hall, Nung Udoe Ediene; Market Square, Ediene Ikot Obio Imo
Uyo	Oku 11	Health Centre, Afaha Idoro; Village Hall, Afaha Idoro; Village Hall, Nung Uyo Idoro; Open Space Opp. Xtian Assembly Church, Nung Obio Enang; Cath Nur Sch, Nung Ediene I; Cath Nur Sch, Nung Ediene II; Open Space Opp Chief's Compd, Ikot Akpan Ediene; Pry Sch, Nung Udoe Ediene; Village Hall, Nung Udoe Ediene; Market Square, Ediene Ikot Obio Imo
