= Oro religion =

Traditional Belief of the Oron people

The Oron people religio-cultural heritage was handed down from generation to generation through oral tradition and sacred institutions. The religion emphasized belief in ancestral spirits, life after death, good moral values, superhuman (transcendental) powers, divinities and a belief in a Supreme Being known as Abazi Oro (The God of Heaven).

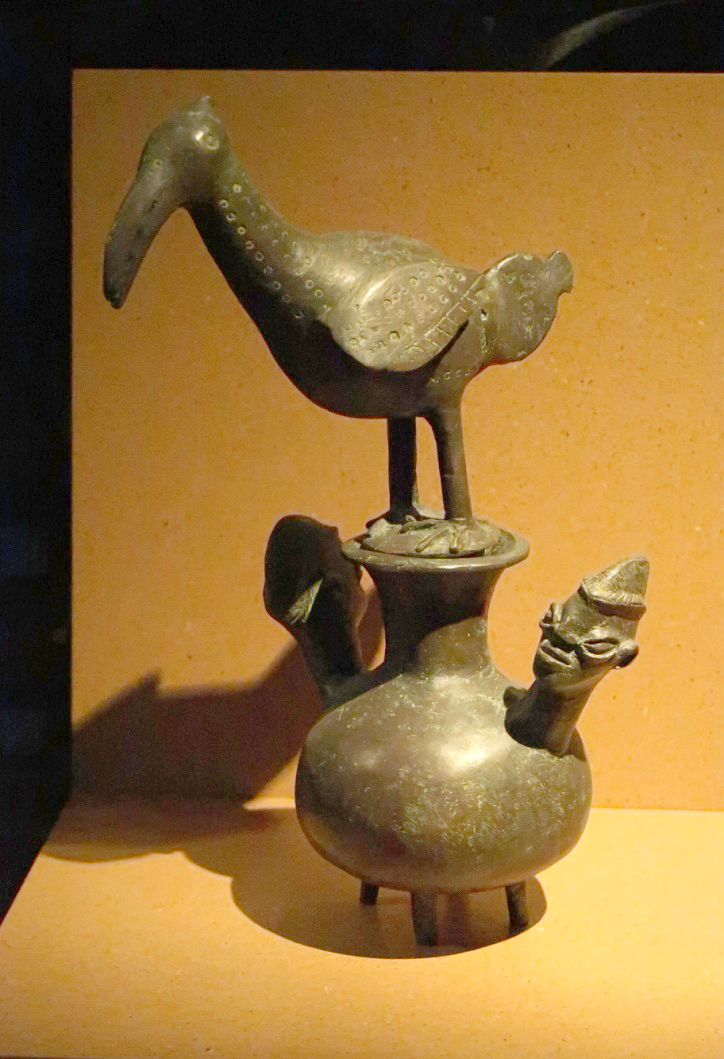
Oron Traditional Ritual Vase

== Abazi Udung Oyong (Abazi Oro) ==
Like their Ibibio and Efik neighbours, the Oron people recognized a hierarchy of a spiritual power culminating in the Great, Omnipotent, Omniscient and all-powerful Abazi Odung Oyong (God of the Sky). The special attributes of this God were that he lived in the sky from where he saw and judged all human actions; He is regarded as the creator of everything, rewarding all good deeds and punishing bad ones, also being the source of life and death and manifested himself daily among the people. However, this Omnipotent God was far removed physically and manifested himself through equally powerful representatives who are also designated Abazi.

== Abazi Udung Isong ==
It is said in Oron folklore that

"Abazi Odung Oyong creates meanwhile Abazi Odung Isong sustains being the source of food, water, shelter, medicinal herbs and all other things that sustain life, also the sustenance of the living which final resting place is death".

Many Abazi is held in high esteemed after the Abazi Odung Oyong, in Agriculture She was represented by Abazi Utei (God of farming) to which everyone sacrifice at the beginning of every far farming season, and every family had Abazi Okoro (God of the Compound) which is the protector of the people, animal, properties and among others, sacrifices were made on Obribong a local market day. Similarly God of prosperity (Abazi Inam) which was credited for responsibility of the wealth of any individual or society. Finally in the Fishing sacrifices were made to Abazi Esuk (god of the river) by throwing the head of beheaded cows in the river for security in the sea with blessings and abundant catch.

Serving as intermediary between this gods and man were ancestral cults. Each family had its shrine where they carved wooden images made from the 'Oko' tree representing their ancestral father was kept.

== Olughu ==
Apart from the ancestral shrines each villages had its central deity (Olughu) and a shrine dedicated to her. Among the best ones whose influences went beyond their villages were 'Abanga Nlak Umume', 'Atiabang Okuku Township', 'Awai Uboro Oro', 'Ukit-eti Eyo Abasi', 'Atakpa Udung-Uko', 'Okpokim Edikor Eyiba', 'Enweme of Uba, Ubotong people', 'Etifit of Eyukut all in Enwang', 'Olughu Ubuoho of Eyotong' Olughu Mkpok Okwong of Okossi, and 'Otokpor of Udesi' and so on. These villages Olughus were used to detect crimes, settle disputes between individuals and families, and enforce village norm through rituals and punishment of offenders.

Also each of the clans had their deities whose influences went beyond villages in a particular clan. Thus, the Ibighi had their 'Eke-Eme Oro' (The Great Mother of Oron people) whose shrine was at Uya Oron to whom villages in the clan made their periodic sacrifices. The Idua had 'Uruting', 'Asang', 'Anamfa', 'Etung Okin' etc. The Ebughu had 'Atabang Ebughu' located in present day Ebughu and Udung-Uko Villages. The Enwang had 'Anantigha' whose approval was sought before undertaking any major task. Among the Okobo, the best known Olughu were 'Esuk Itak ' in Odu and Udutin in Eta. Sacrifices were made to this clan deities periodically by each villages meanwhile some were being consulted by other villages outside their clan of origin.

Taken together, the Oron entire religious system of the Supreme God, the lesser god, the ancestors spirit, the various Olughu and Mbiams, the Ndem etc, served as an essential ingredients in the maintenance of order, law and social control as well as unifying influences among villages and clans that made up Oron Nation.
