= Uko =

Uko may refer to:

== People ==
- Uko Fockena (c. 1408–1432), East Frisian chieftain
- Uko Nkole (born 1975), Nigerian politician
- Ukō Washio (1892–1951), Japanese novelist
- George Uko (born 1992), American gridiron football player
- Ikechi Uko (born 1964), Nigerian travel business consultant
- Imaobong Nse Uko (born 2004), Nigerian athlete.
- Peace Uko (born 1995), Nigerian track and field sprinter

== Places ==
- Udung-Uko, local government area in Nigeria
- Uko Akpan, town in Nigeria
- Uko Ukwong, town in Nigeria
- Uko Uyokim, town in Nigeria
- Mbukpo-Uko-Akai, village in Nigeria
- Udung Uko Town, village in Nigeria
- Ubodung Udung Uko, village in Nigeria

== See also ==
- Ukko (disambiguation)
