= Uya (disambiguation) =

Uya is a Chinese Manchu clan. Uya may also refer to

Places in Nigeria

- Eyo Uya, a village
- Eyo-Uya, a town
- Uya Oro, a town
- Uya Oron, a town

Places elsewhere

- Uya (river) in Russia
- Uya, Republic of Buryatia, a rural locality in Russia
- Phiri Uya, a mountain in Peru

Other

- Uya language of Papua New Guinea
- Uya (surname)
