= Ikot Ese =

Ikot Ese may refer to the following places in Akwa Ibom state, Nigeria:

- Ikot Ese, Etinan, a village in the Etinan local government area
- Ikot Ese, Uruan, a village in the Uruan local government area
