= Okobo, Nigeria =

Okobo Aták Oro Oron North
- LGA
- Interactive map of Okobo
- Location in Nigeria
- Coordinates: 4°50′0″N 8°08′0″E
- Country: Nigeria
- State: Akwa Ibom State
- Capital: Okopedi
- Created: 1989

Government
  - Chairman: The council is currently managed by a transition committee headed by Hon. George Henshaw.

Area
  - Land: 475.8 km^{2} (183.7 sq mi)

Population (2006)
  - Total: 102,753
- Time zone: UTC+1 (WAT)
- Postal code: 521
- Area codes: 521101, 521102, 521103, 521104, 521105, 521106, 521107.

Okobo is located in the South South part of Nigeria and is a Local Government Area of Akwa Ibom State. It is made up of Odu, Eta and Atabong clans. Following the local government creation exercise of the federal government in 1989 Okobo Local Government Area was carved out of Oron, Akwa Ibom same year.

== History ==
Okobo government area is bounded by Uruan in the North-West, Oyono Estuary in the North East, Oron, Akwa Ibom in the East, Urue-Offong/Oruko in the South-East, Nsit Atai in the West, Esit Eket in the south, and Nsit Ubium in the South West.

Okobo is one of the five Oron people Local Government in Akwa Ibom State. The local government is made up of Four (4) clans (where some are now known as district) out of the Nine (9) Oron Clans (Afaha) which are Afaha Okpo, Afaha Ukwong, Afaha Ibighi, Afaha Ebughu and Afaha Okiuso. Three Clans constitute the Okobo Mbawa people. These clans include Odu, Eta and Atabong. Okobo is said to be formed during the great migration from Usakedet (Afaha Edit) now Isangele Area in Cameroon.

Francis Ekpenyong posits that there is close unanimity about the putative father of Okobo. He is said to have been Abikot Atipa who led his people from Usahadit (Isangele) in the present day Cameroons. He settled at Ebughu/Enwang corridor. The evidence is Okobo Ebughu and the principal Okobo deity, Anentighe at Enwang. He sent his wife, Abia Ataghafog, and others to look for a favourable place for permanent settlement. He found the place and named it 'Okowo' because it was shown to him. Okobo is the anglicization of Okowo. Abikot suffered untold hardship in moving from place to place. He passed through Eyotong, Uruting, Ebighi and settled at Ebighi Eta. Is it any wonder why Ebighi is regarded as the 'Eke', Mother of Okobo? Abikot lost his siblings during the arduous passage. He named his subsequent children to reflect this experience. The first son he called 'Eta', a grim resignation to the fact that 'they have eaten' his first set of children. The second he called 'Adu', a prophetic reassurance that his subsequent children shall live. Eta and Adu had children. The first son of Eta was Nung Atai Eta. The second was Akibedi anglicized Okopedi. Adu, anglicized Odu, had Ekeya, Ebighi Edu and others. Eta and Odu were the first original clans in Okobo. Atabong had a different migratory route. The group was led by Ema Antai from Adiabo, who was looking for a safe place to fish away from the attack from crocodiles. They were given a place 'ato' where cane 'obong' grows. Combination of the two words yielded Atabong. Atabong is the third clan in Okobo Mbawa. Obufi is in Eta Clan. According to oral history it is a combination of Obufa and Ofi, (Obufa Ofi) The people migrated from Etieke Ofi in Atak Oro, the other component of Okobo LGA. Efik is spoken widely in Okobo. This derives from the influence of Efik Christian and Primitive Methodist Missionaries who came from Calabar in the early 20th century. There is close affinity between Efik an Okobo. The language is intelligible to Okobo people. It is said that anybody who claims Efik heritage must have a relation in Okobo. Otherwise he is a slave.

According to Isaac Okon, Akobuo Mbawa has three migration links of Igboland, the Eburutu and the Usahadit. The most popular and acceptable by Akobuo people is the Usahadit (now called Isangele). After the stampede at Usahadit, they moved to Ebughu-Enwang corridor in the present Mbo LGA. From there to the present Uya-Oro creek where they were attacked by raiders. Before the landed at Ebighi Akobuo. I want to add that we should pay attention to namings in Akobuo as this will to a greater extent explain the history of Akobuo. Such names like 'Okowo', 'Eta', 'Adu', 'Ato-obong', 'Akipedi', 'Amuong', 'Udung Ape Eta', 'Ebighi', etc..

Another historical postulate as handed down to Effiong Ekong is as follows: Akobuo people migrated from Usahaedet though there are some who also speculate that Akobuo people migrated from Igboland and Cross River. Among the three corridors Usahaedet is said to be the most authentic. When Akobuo people left Usahaedet, they journeyed to Ebughu in the present day Mbo LGA. After a short stay in Ebughu, they continued their journey till they arrived at the present day Ebighi in Okobo LGA. Please note that there were some people who were not strong enough to leave Ebughu. Those ones were left behind, and they started where is today known as Okobo Ebughu in Mbo LGA. Those who arrived at Ebighi began to spread. Some of them went as far as a place known then as Ato-ibong and settled. That is where we call Atabong today. The original name was Ato-ibong. Some who could not make it to Ato-ibong remained in what is today known as Obufi, originally known as Obufa Obio. Those who moved Northward settled in where is today known as Ebighi Eta and gave birth to Nung Atai (Ape), and Akibedi (Ulo). The Ape travelled as far as a place known as Nung Atte in the present day Nsit Atai LGA. On their return home to their present location, they adopted the name Nung Atai.

As for the Ulo (Abikot Atipa), he had to cross a big raven (abedeng) which divided Ebighi Eta and the present day Akibedi then. On crossing to the other side, he announced to those who wish to join him that they could come (ekimedi). It is from his pronouncement "Ekimedi" that the name Akibedi emanated from. It should however be noted that while the Ape and Ulo were moving further North from Ebighi Eta, some people equally moved Westward and arrived where is today known as Ebighi Edu. Aside those who arrived at Akibedi, there were some who also traveled as far as Ekeya. Those who settled in Ekeya took their farming as far as the present day Esuk and Obot Inwang, and because of the long distance, some of these farmers started building houses there to stay after their farm work. Gradually, others began to join until it became villages known today as Esuk Inwang and Obot Inwang. Esuk Inwang was a combination of the Greek and the Farm. Today, Ndon Ebom is laying claim to Esuk Inwang because of presence of Crude in that land. Before I forget, while Nung Atai people were traveling as far as Nung Atte, some of them remained and started lives in the present day Nung Atai Odobo. They are the remnants of Nung Atai Etta. They later expanded to become two brothers Community, with addition of Nung Udom Odobo. Atipa Odobo are those who crossed the present Okobo- Ikot Asua road from Abikot Atipa (Akibedi) to settle in between Nung Udom and Nung Atai Odobo. The last people who left Ebighi Eta are those known today as Amamong (Amuong in Akobuo language). When they moved out from their mother (Ebighi Eta), they were asked Ema mmong? Meaning, where would you like to stay? They then chose in between Akibedi and Ekeya where they are today. Unlike what we see today, there was no fighting for land as they regarded one another as brother. The other villages like Ube, Nda and Akibabo are the offshoot of those who remained in Ebighi.

According to Efiong Ita, the indigenes of Atabong (a historic Efik enclave) in Okobo local Government Area migrated from Adiabo Ikot Mbo Otu in the present Odukpani Local Government Area of Cross River State. The people came in as fishermen and traders embodied with Efik Culture and settled. Our ancestors settled in Atabong and we were joined by Efiat People from now Mbo. Some of our people journeyed to the Atlantic Ocean and established the Bakassi Peninsula which is the second Atabong settlement and now the new Bakassi local government in Cross River State. The word *Atabong* was derived from the originality of the raffia products found within the area of our settlement in Okobo called *obong*. Meaning original obong (Ata- bong)

Historically, Okobo people have been protective of their community. In ancient times, if strangers tried to enter the boundary villages with the intention to harm people, cause riots or threaten the peace of the indigenes, they were disbanded automatically due to the charms of protection hung across every corner of the community.

== Language ==
Several languages are spoken in Okobo local government area because of the complex constitution of the local government area. Okobo language in spoken in Odu and Eta clans. Oro language is spoken in Atak Oro. Efik language is widely spoken in Atabong clan. Ebighi-Edu as well as parts of Ekeya also speak Efik. Language in Okobo is more than a means of communication; it is a vehicle for cultural expression and social cohesion. The use of Okobo in songs, particularly recreational and work songs, is a testament to its central role in the community. These songs are not just about music; they are a repository of the community's history, values, and collective memory.

== Clans and settlement ==
The area has Seven Clans (now districts) in Okobo namely Afaha Eta, Odu, Atabong, Afaha Ukwong, Ebughu, Afaha Okiuso and Ibighi. Okobo people are in the first three districts - Odu, Eta and Atabong while the Atak Oro people (a defunct LGA) reside in the remaining four districts. To the North is Esuk Inwang (4° 56' 0" North, 8° 6' 0" East) and to the South is Nda (4° 47' 55” North, 8° 7' 34”East). The Coordinates of Nung Atai Eta are 4°51'0" N and 8°7'60" E and those of Odobo are 4° 49' 32 North and 8° 6' 38” East.

Odu consist of thirteen (13) villages which are;

- Akiba Obo
- Anua Ekeya
- Ebighi Edu
- Ebighi Okobo
- Ekpene Ekim
- Esuk Inwang
- Idibenin
- Nda
- Nung Ukana
- Obot Inwang
- Ube
- Ufok Esuk

Eta consist of Seventeen (17) town and villages which includes;

- Afaha Nsung
- Akananwana
- Amamong
- Anua Okopedi
- Ape Amamong
- Atai Amamong
- Ata Atai Otope
- Atipa Odobo
- Ebighi Eta
- Ekpene Ekim Eta
- Ibawa
- Mbieduo
- Nsating
- Nung Atai Eta
- Nung Atai Odobo
- Nung Udom Odobo
- Obufi.

Atabong consist of four villages which is

- Ikot Iquo
- Ikot Odiong
- Ikot Okokon
- Ikot Osukpong.

Afaha Ukwong Clan consist of fifteen (15) town and villages which includes

- Afaha Osu
- Ebighi Anwa Ikpi
- Ebighi Anwa Oro
- Etieke Udong Eto
- Eweme
- Eyo Nku
- Itak Uyati
- Mbukpo Oduobo
- Ndoung
- Osu Offi
- Oti Oron
- Otieke
- Ubak
- Utine Eyekung
- Utine Ndoung.

Afaha Ebughu Clan consist of five villages which includes

- Eyede
- Ikono Oro
- Nsie
- Uruting

Afaha Okiuso Clan consist of nine (9) villages which includes

- Akai Nyo
- Isa Okiuso
- Itak Okiuso
- Udung Afiang
- Udung Amkpe
- Udung Ukpong
- Udung Ulo
- Udung Umo

Afaha Ibighi Clan consist of four (4) villages that is

- Afaha Akai
- Atiabang
- Oyoku Assang
- Urue Ita

== Natural resources ==
Okobo is endowed with a tropical forest, resources with mahogany for supply of wood for boat, housing and canoe construction. There are significant deposits of clay, fine sand and crude oil. Fishing and farming are common in this local government area.

== Culture ==
The cultural heritage is demonstrated in several traditional dances and masquerades such as Ekpe.

The traditional marriage ceremonies in Okobo are similar to those of the Efiks. The list include:

- Knocking drinks (Mmin ukong usung)
- Prayer drinks (Mmin akam)
- Drinks for expressing intention (mmin ukop iko)
- Introduction Drinks (Mmin mbup)
- Appreciation drinks (Mmin ekom)

This list is just for the Mbub (introductory) ceremony. The traditional marriage list (Nkpo Ndo) comes with its own set of rites and “gifts.” However, the “bride-price” used to be a standard £12 (bon duopeba).

== Political Wards ==
Wards	Ward Centers
Okopedi 1	Central School, Okobo
Okopedi 2	Comprehensive Secondary School, Okobo
Nung Atai/Ube 1	Town Hall, Ube
Nung Atai/Ube 2	Village Square, Obufi
Nung Atai/Ube 3	St. Peter’s School, Nung Atai Eta
Akai/Mbukpo/Udung	Primary School, Mbokpu-Odobo
Eweme 1	Government School, Urua Ita
Eweme 2	Government School, Eweme
Ekeya	Government School, Ekeya
Offi 1	St. Andrew’s School, Oti-oro
Offi 2	St. James School, Etieke Offi

== See also ==
- Oron people
- Urue-Offong/Oruko
- Mbo, Akwa Ibom
- Oron, Akwa Ibom
- Udung Uko
- Obolo, Akwa Ibom
- Akwa Ibom State
- Oron Nation

== Sources ==
- Essesien Ntekim (21 May 2013). OKOBO: Story of a Nigerian People. Xlibris. ISBN 978-1-4797-9114-9.
- Okobo LGA | Helloakwaibom
- Efik Marriage “Knocking” Ceremony - Mbub Ndo K’ido Efik | Rosemary Aqua
- List Of Traditional Marriage Requirements In Calabar/Efik
- Okon Uya A history of Oron people of the lower Cross River basin - 1984
- Efik and Calabar Traditional Marriage List and requirements
- Isaac Okon. Advent of Catholicism in Okobo
- Effiong Ekong, Oral Tradition
- Francis Ekpenyong, Oral Tradition
- Efiong Ita, Oral Tradition
- Sylvanus Asiya, The Okobo People, A Cultural Perspective
