= Etim Inyang =

Inspector General of Police in Nigeria

6th Inspector General of Police
- In office 1983–1986
- Preceded by: Sunday Adewusi
- Succeeded by: Muhammadu Gambo Jimeta

Personal details
- Born: 25 December 1930 Enwang, Mbo, Akwa Ibom, Colony and Protectorate of Nigeria
- Died: 26 September 2016 (aged 85) Lagos, Nigeria
- Party: Non-partisan
- Children: 6

Etim Okon Inyang (25 December 1930 – 26 September 2016) was a Nigerian Policeman and former Inspector General of Police. He was appointed in 1983 to succeed Sunday Adewusi and was succeeded by Muhammadu Gambo Jimeta in 1986.

== Biography ==
Inyang was born in Enwang, Mbo, Akwa Ibom, the son of Okon Inyang the traditional ruler at Enwang. He had his education at the Roman Catholic School, Uko-Akpan (1936 - 1937), Methodist School, Oron (1939 - 1940) and Oyubia Secondary School, Oron (1941 - 1945). Before he joined the police force, Inyang was a teacher between from 1946 and 1949.

Inyang joined the Nigeria Police Force as a Constable in October 1949, he became a Lance Corporal in 1957 and was made Corporal in 1958. He became an Inspector in 1958, Assistant Superintendent of Police, (1960 - 1963), Deputy Superintendent of Police (1963 - 1965) and Superintendent of Police in 1965. He was Chief Superintendent of Police (1967 - 1971), Assistant Commissioner of Police (1971 - 1974), Commissioner of Police (1975 - 1980). Between 1961 and 1971, he was an officer at the INTERPOL office of the Central Criminal Investigation Department. In 1974, he managed the establishment of a Traffic Warden Service in the police force. Inyang was Assistant Inspector General of Police (1980 - 1984) and Inspector General in 1984. He died at the age of 84 in Lagos, Nigeria.
