= Esuk Oro =

Coordinates: 4.8029°N 8.2534°E

Esuk Oro Esuk Oro
- Town
- Location in Nigeria
- Country: Nigeria
- State: Akwa Ibom
- Local Government Area: Oron, Akwa Ibom

Esuk Oro is an Oron Community in Oron local government area of Akwa Ibom state in Nigeria where the Maritime Academy of Nigeria and Methodist Boys' High School, Oron is located.
