= Mbo, Nigeria =

Mbo LGA Mmóng Mmóng Ōró Oron South
- LGA
- Interactive map of Mbo LGA
- Location within Nigeria
- Coordinates: 4°39′0″N 8°14′0″E
- Country: Nigeria
- State: Akwa Ibom State
- Capital: Enwang
- Created: 1989

Government
  - Chairman: Asukwo Effiong Eyo

Area
  - Total: 318.1 km^{2} (122.8 sq mi)

Population (2022)
  - Total: 130,400
  - Density: 409.9/km^{2} (1,062/sq mi)
- Time zone: UTC+1 (WAT)
- Postal code: 534
- Area code: 534111

Mbo is located in the South Eastern part of Nigeria and is a Local Government Area in Akwa Ibom State. Following the local government creation exercise of the federal government in 1989 Mbo Local Government Area was carved out of Oron Division same year.

== History ==
Mbo is bounded in the North axis by Urue-Offong/Oruko Local Government Area, in the South axis by Atlantic Ocean and Cameroon, in the East by Udung Uko Local Government Area and in the West by Esit Eket and Ibeno Local Government Areas.

Mbo LGA is one of the five Oron people Local Government in Akwa Ibom State. The local government is made up of clans (where some are now known as district) which are Afaha Okpo Clan, Effiat, Afaha Ukwong (now known as Nkwong District), Ibiaku, Ikpo Ikono, Ikpa Ibom, Atanuk and Ekpuk.

== Language ==
The people generally speak Oro language with minor dialectical differences, with strong cultural affinity among the people. The Oro language is popularly spoken by the people of Mbo Local Government Area followed by the Efik language with Ebughu language, Efai language and Enwang-Uda language.

== Clan/District And Settlement ==
Mbo is divided into six districts.

Afaha Okpo Clan or District consists of eleven (11) Oro language speaking villages and towns, which include the following:

- Ekiebong
- Eyo Efai
- Eyo Ukut
- Ibete
- Ibuet Ikot
- Uba, Ubotong
- Udini
- Udombo
- Udung Eyo
- Adaeba
- Uko Akpan

Effiat Clan or Distrist consists of sixteen Efai language, Efik language and Oro language speaking villages and towns. They include the following:

- Akpa Nkanua
- Akwa Obio Effiat
- Asiok Obufa
- Esuk Anwang
- Ibuot Utan
- Ine Inua Abasi
- Inua Abasi
- Mbe Ndoro
- Obio Iyata
- Obong Nim
- Usuk Effiat
- Utan Antai
- Utan Brama
- Utang Efiong

Afaha Ukwong Clan Or Nkwong District consists of fourteen (14) towns and villages, which speak the oro language, Uda language, and Efik language. They include the following:

- Akai Ati
- Akai owu
- Akprang
- Eprang Udo
- Ibaka Town (Uda)
- Isong Inyang
- Kprang (Uda)
- Mkpang Utong
- Offi (Uda)
- Onukim (Uda)
- Osu Udesi
- Udung Eyo Unyenge
- Uke Nteghe
- Utit Atai Unyenge.
- Utan Udombo

Ibiaku Clan or District is an Efik settlement. It includes the following:

- Esa Ekpo
- Ibekwe-Akpan Nya
- Ibiaku Esa Ekpo
- Ikot Abasi Akpan
- Ikot Abia Enin
- Ikot Aka
- Ikot Ata/Nung Ikono
- Ikot Ekpenyong
- Ikot Idiong
- Ikot Itina Mbo
- Ikot Ntot
- Ikot-Akpabong
- Ikot-Ebak
- Minya Ntak
- Ndot/Abat Nya
- Nya Odiong

Ikpo Ikono District includes fifteen (15) Efik settlement. It includes the following:

- Asana Mbo
- Ekpuk
- Ibianga
- Iffe
- Ikot Abia-Utok
- Ikot Afang
- Ikot Eda
- Ikot Ekpaw
- Ikot Enyienge
- Ikot Esen Akpan Ntuen
- Ikot Mkpeye
- Ikot Obio-Nso
- Ikot Umiang
- Ikot Unya Iton

Ikpa Ibom District includes twenty-eight (28) villages and towns:

- Atanuk
- Ekim
- Ibiotio
- Ikot Aba
- Ikot Akata Mbo
- Ikot Akpa-Ekop Mbo
- Ikot Akpabio Ukam
- Ikot Akpaden
- Ikot Akpan Ukam
- Ikot Ayan
- Ikot Edim
- Ikot Edong Ukam
- Ikot Ekong
- Ikot Ekpang
- Ikot Enin
- Ikot Etefia Ukam
- Ikot Eto
- Ikot Iseghe
- Ikot Obio Ekpong
- Ikot Obio Ndoho
- Ikot Obio-Akai
- Ikot Okop – Odong
- Ikot Oyoro
- Ikot Ukwa
- Ikotn Inyang-Okop
- Ndom Gbodom
- Ndom Ibotio
- Obioete

== Commerce and People ==
Mbo is made up of friendly and busy people with greater influxes of non indigene and their occupation is Marine-based, comprising fishing, marine transportation and subsistent farming. Fishing is an important economic activity in Mbo LGA with the area’s rivers and tributaries being is rich in seafood. The LGA is also blessed with fertile soil and is a hub for the cultivation of a number of crops such as plantain, vegetables, cassava and a variety of fruits. Other important economic engagements undertaken by the people of Mbo LGA include trade, crafts making, and the construction of canoes and fishing nets.

== Geography ==
Mbo LGA covers a total area of 365 square kilometres and has an average temperature of 25°C. The LGA consists of large forest reserves and has an average humidity level of 80%. Mbo LGA hosts several rivers and streams with an average wind speed of 11 km/h.

== Natural Resources ==
Natural Resources in Mbo includes Forest resources such as timber, vegetables and fruits Mineral deposits such as clay, fine sand, salt, gravel and crude oil which is found onshore and offshore is also available in large quantity.

== Notable people ==
Late Chief Etim Inyang, a former Inspector General of Police (Nigeria) . He was from Enwang in Mbo LGA

== Political Wards ==
Wards	Ward Centers
Enwang 1	Primary School, Uko Akpan
Enwang 2	Primary School, Ubotong
Ebughu 1	Primary School, Okobo Ebughu
Ebughu 2	Primary School, Osu Ebughu
Udesi	Primary School, Akai Owu
Effiat 1	Primary School, Inua Abasi
Effiat 2	Primary School, Esuk Enwang
Ibaka	Primary School, Ibaka
Uda 1	Primary School, Offi Uda
Uda 2	Primary School, Uda
Uda 3	Primary School, Unyenge

== See also ==
- Oron people
- Urue-Offong/Oruko
- Oron, Akwa Ibom
- Okobo, Akwa Ibom
- Udung Uko
- Obolo
- Akwa Ibom State
- Efik
