= Coomassie =

Coomassie may refer to:

- Coomassie brilliant blue, a dye
- Coomassie, an historical name for Kumasi, Ghana, and namesake of the dye

== See also ==
- Ibrahim Coomassie, Nigerian police officer
- Abidina Coomassie, Nigerian journalist
