= Obio Ndobo =

- Urban
- Country: Nigeria
- State: Akwa Ibom
- Local Government Area: Uruan

Obio Ndobo is a village in Uruan local government area of Akwa Ibom state in Nigeria.
