= Ikot Inyang-Idung =

- Village
- Interactive map of Ikot Inyang-Idung
- Country: Nigeria
- State: Akwa Ibom
- Local Government Area: Uruan

Ikot Inyang-Idung is a village in Uruan local government area of Akwa Ibom state in Nigeria.
