= Ndoro (disambiguation) =

Ndoro is an administrative ward in Tanzania.

Ndoro may also refer to:

- Ndoro language, a name for what is more commonly known as the Ndoola or Njoyamɛ language in Nigeria and Cameroon

== Places ==
- Ndoro, Abia State, a town in Nigeria
- Mbe Ndoro, a village in Akwa Ibom State, Nigeria
- Toru-Ndoro, a human settlement in Bayelsa State, Nigeria

== People ==
- Millicent Ndoro, Kenyan sprinter
- Tendai Ndoro, Zimbabwean soccer player
- Webber Ndoro, Zimbabwean archaeologist
