= Methodist Boys' High School, Oron =

High school in Oron, Nigeria

Coordinates: 4.80729°N 8.25686°E

Methodist Boys' High School, Oron.
- Oron, Akwa Ibom State; Nigeria

Information
- Type: Secondary
- Motto: Hold fast that which is good
- Denomination: Methodist
- Established: 18 September 1905
- Principal: Mr. Effiong O. Imah
- Grades: JS1–SS3
- Color: Maroon White Brown
- Nickname: MBHS Oron

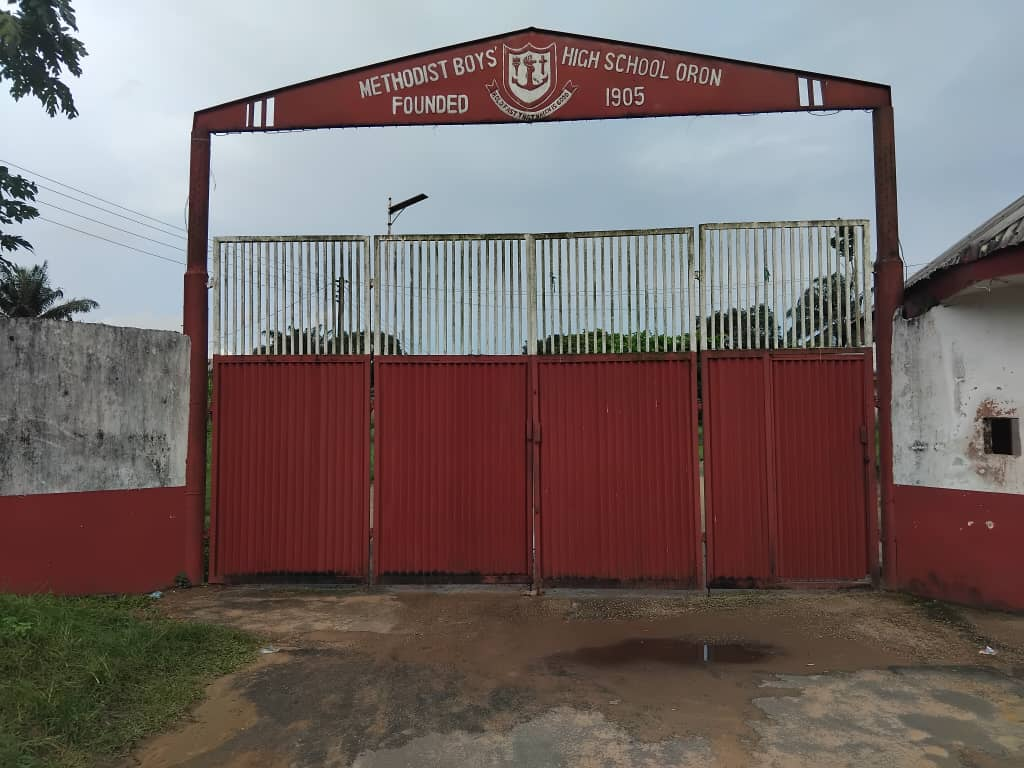
Methodist boys high school Gate

Methodist Boys’ High School, Oron (MBHS Oron) in Nigeria was established on 18 September 1905 following a proposal by Rev. Nathaniel Boocock a Primitive Methodist Church Minister whose pioneering works in the west coast of Africa also contributed in creating the Missions at Bottler Point, Urua Eye (Udesi) and Adadia. Initially named Oron Training Institute (OTI), the school was established in order to turn the brightest schoolboys into teachers, and in the hope that some of them might eventually become Ministers.

== History ==
In 1870, two Primitive Methodist evangelists, William Robinson and James Hands, landed near Oron, and began evangelizing. Before returning to England, a group of Christian converts handed them a letter dated 25 August 1869, requesting that a Minister be sent to them. Following the request, two evangelists, Reverend R. W. Burnett and Henry Roe were selected by the Primitive Methodist Society to embark on a foreign field mission to Africa. On their arrival in that Spanish colony on 21 February 1897, they were warmly welcomed in the house of a fervent convert, Elizabeth ‘Momma’ Job. While there, they built a station and started evangelical work. However, the unfriendly policies of the Spanish authorities which led to the closure of Mission schools there, prompted the Primitive Methodists to turn their search towards a British controlled territory in the Nigerian mainland of West Africa. Hence, in 1893, Archibong Town became the first foreign field to host the Primitive Methodist Mission in Nigeria. A follow up to this was the opening of another station at James Town by Rev. W. J. Ward. The progress in Archibong Town was subsequently hampered by a ruling of joint boundary commission of both the British and German governments, which ceded Archibong Town into the German territory. This resulted in migration of faithfuls to Ikang and across the river to Afaha Eduok, where the Chiefs and natives were benevolent enough to offer them land to settle. According to Rev. G. E. Wiles, he and Rev. Nathaniel Boocock were traveling to Calabar when they sighted the site and with the eye of faith, Boocock said ‘there I will build my school’. With Archibong Town gradually losing significance, the Oron station was steadily gaining concentration as reflected in Rev. G. H. Hanney's statement...

"Today Archibongville is merely an out-station, almost deserted, but the result of Archibongville is seen in the 400 square miles we occupy on the right bank of the Cross River, and the stations that have been opened further up country, and of which much will be heard in the days that are to come. The Oron Mission has a river frontage of about thirty miles, with an area inland averaging fifteen or sixteen miles in breadth…’’.

With the aid of a Steam Launch from the Marine Department, the Mission House, (a prefabricated structure) was subsequently shipped from Archibong Town to Oron where it was assembled in 1902.

Hence, the first real step towards the development of Western education in Africa by the Primitive Methodist Mission commenced at Oron, where Training Institute for Boys (boarding) was built. This was a direct outcome of the proposal made by Reverend Nathanial Boocock in association with his colleagues. During a meeting of the executive committee of Primitive Methodist Missionary Society (P.M.M.S) in Birmingham, Boocock had proposed:

"That a Training Institute be erected at Oron, where we can receive boarders from our mission schools in Fernando Po and also the most promising youths from our mission schools in mainland (Nigeria). That, while a general education be given which may include instruction in carpentry and other useful trades, the pre-eminent aim of the Masters shall be to train the youths with a view to their becoming Native Teaching Evangelists"

With a resolution adopted after a meeting on 10 May 1904, £1000 was raised by the Christian Endeavour Societies, a popular movement among the Primitive Methodists in England, to defray the cost of the institute. It will be readily seen that the man upon whom the getting of the £1,000 has entailed most cost is the late Secretary, the Rev. George Bennett. And with the arrival of Rev. W. J. Ward in August 1905, the school formerly commenced with two (2) teachers and sixteen (16) students on roll. All but three of the original sixteen students were boarders. Mr. Efa Ekpesuk who was the teacher at Archibong was the Asst. Master. The first set of buildings were erected by Rev. R. Banham. There were three main buildings of corrugated iron sheets – a classroom, a dormitory and a third building which comprises a common room and a Day room. The former had been destroyed during the Nigerian Civil War. On a good part of its foundation stood an all-purpose Hall used as classroom block. By the end of the first term, there were eighteen students. All belonged to the Christian Endeavor Society and conducted services each Sunday and sometimes on weekdays in the neighborhood villages.

== Early curriculum and development ==
The school commenced with 16 pupils. By the end of the first term, the number enrolled rose to 18. Shortly after its establishment, its unifying character was indicated in the origins of the pupils enrolled. The 24 boarders and 4 day-pupils were drawn from Fernando Po, Urua Eye, James Town, Esuk Oron, Akani Obio and Calabar. By 1910, therefore, it was possible to conclude that the school was “full” and helped to produce fusion of tribes that was full of promise.

In 1955, the school had on roll 170 boys and 12 teachers. While the school has been an all-boys school from inception, girls were later admitted to be part of two-year Higher Certificate (Arts) classes (Forms 6 and 7). The Sciences section of the Higher School Certificate course was later added in January 1963.

A census of the school in 1965 showed the following figures: Annang 38, Igbo 58, Efik 6, Oron 193 (including non-teaching staff and their families), Ijaw 4, Ogoni 6, British 6, Indians 1, German 1, American 1. There were 359 male and 23 female residents in the school community (including family members of the masters). Between 1940s and early 1960s, the variety was even more astounding. There were Cameroonians, Equatorial Guineans and Nigerians from the North, even Muslims. Ogoni and Igbo were especially large in number. The school was a pleasant place to live in.

By February 1977 according to the school records, enrolment was 888 (718 boarders, 170 day-students). Among the boarders there were 17 girls, all belonging to the Higher School Certificate (Arts) Course. Tremendous growth was also witnessed in all spheres of sports activities with the introduction of new games like cricket, quoits, inter-class/inter-school football matches, etc. As of 1980, the student's population grew to 1099 with 30 teachers. Joint inter-house sports competition and Sunday service with the sister school, Mary Hanney Secondary School had since assumed a regular feature.

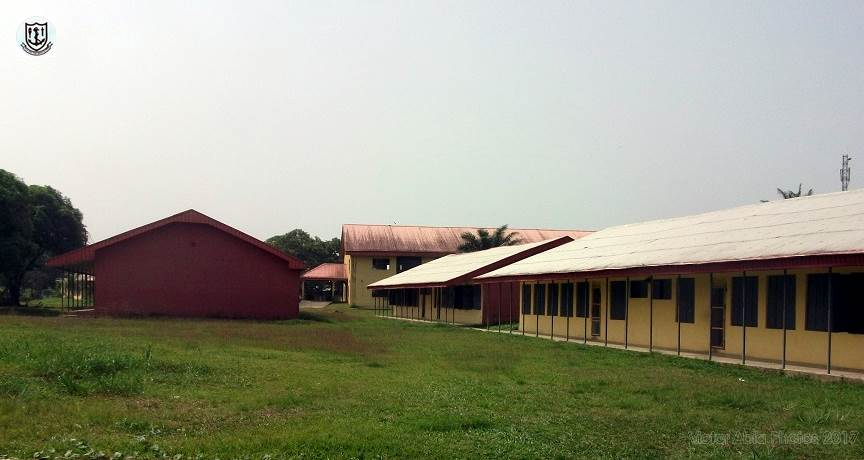
Academic Block

Following the return of Mission Schools in Akwa Ibom State to their original owners in 2006, management of MBHS Oron was handed back to the Methodist Mission. But the free education policy of Akwa Ibom State government and improved facilities in government-controlled schools at the time resulted in drastic reduction in admission intake of new students into the school while management struggled to cope with degenerating infrastructures and salary payments. The development did not go down well with the Old Boys community as all chapters of the Association immediately commenced efforts at bringing the plight of the school to the knowledge of government. After intense pressure, the government of Akwa Ibom State formally took over management of the school on 18 September 2022, during the school’s 117th Founders Day anniversary celebration and Homecoming. The handing over was performed by Late Prelate of Methodist Church, Dr. Sunday Mbang, thus opening a new era in the life of the institution. Reports has it that, with the new development, number of students which had dwindled as low as 200 has increased to a little above 1000 and still counting, within a period of 10 months from the handover date.

== List of principals from 1905 ==
| # | Name | Tenure |
|---|---|---|
| 1 | Rev. W. J. Ward | 1905–1907 |
| 2 | Rev. T. W. Hancox | 1907–1911 |
| 3 | Rev. C. P. Groves | 1912–1924 |
| 4 | Rev. C. W. Showell | 1924–1926 |
| 5 | Mr. W. T. Smith | 1927–1929 |
| 6 | Rev. E. E. Pritchard | 1929–1931 |
| 7 | Rev. C. E. Wiles | 1932–1938 |
| 8 | Rev. N. E. Boulton | 1938–1945 |
| 9 | Rev. C. E. Wiles | 1945–1955 |
| 10 | Rev. S. K. Okpo | 1956–1961 |
| 11 | Mr. W. W. Anderson | 1961–1964 |
| 12 | Mr. C. N. Iroanya | 1964–1965 |
| 13 | Mr. E. E. Bassey | 1965–1970 |
| 14 | Mr. O. W. Inyang | 1970–1971 |
| 15 | Mr. A. U. Umo | 1971–1973 |
| 16 | Mr. U. S. Ekpo | 1973–1974 |
| 17 | Messrs P. O. Akpan & M. A.Eyo | 1975–1976 |
| 18 | Mr. U. S. Ekpo | 1976–1978 |
| 19 | Chief O. O. Awatt | 1978–1980 |
| 20 | Mr. R. A. Ekanem | 1980–1983 |
| 21 | Mr. A. E. Udofia | 1983–1984 |
| 22 | Mr. E. O. Akaiso | 1984 (9 months) |
| 23 | Mr. O. U. Bassey | 1984–1985 |
| 24 | Chief A. A. Ntuen | 1985–1988 |
| 25 | Mr. A. E. Onwineng | 1988 (2 months) |
| 26 | Mr. E. E. Essien | 1988–1989 |
| 27 | Mr. E. O. Uwe | 1989–1990 |
| 28 | Mr. O. U. Ide | 1990–1993 |
| 29 | Elder S. T. Uko | 1993–1995 |
| 30 | Mr. E. Okwong-Udo | 1995–1998 |
| 31 | Mr. Ukpe Unanaowo | 1998–2000 |
| 32 | Mr. Effiong A. Afahakan | 2000–2001 |
| 33 | Mrs. Ubong E. Bassey | 2001–2006 |
| 34 | Chief O. U. Bassey | 2006–2007 |
| 35 | Rev. Ini Atti | 2008–2010 |
| 36 | Elder E. B. Esu | 2010–2011 |
| 37 | Mr. Effiong Jonah Mfon | 2011–2012 |
| 38 | Mrs. Ubong Bassey | 2012–2017 |
| 39 | Mrs. Aniema Bassey | 2017–2018 |
| 40 | Mrs. Nene B. Esin | 2018–2022 |
| 41 | Mr. Effiong O. Imah | 2022- |

The following missionaries were in charge for short periods when the Principals were absent on furlough:

1. Rev. W. Yorcross
2. Rev. H. B. Hardy
3. Rev. C. R. Ransome
4. Rev. H. L. O. Williams
5. Mr. H. Hodgkinson
6. Mr. L. R. Shenton

== Notable alumni ==
- Senator Bassey Ewa-Henshaw. Former Senator representing Cross River South.
- Late Prof. Eskor Toyo. Renowned Professor of Political Economy, Labour Activist, Revolutionary and Marxist scholar.
- Senator Nelson Effiong. Senator of the Federal Republic of Nigeria.
- Justice John Inyang Okoro. Justice of the Nigerian Supreme Court.
- Barrister Ekpo Una Owo Nta. Former Chairman Independent Corrupt Practices and Other Related Offences Commission (ICPC), Full-time Commissioner, National Salaries, Incomes and Wages Commission (NSIWC).
- Etim Esin, football player
