= Ifianyong Obot =

- Village
- Country: Nigeria
- State: Akwa Ibom
- Local Government Area: Uruan

Ifianyong Obot is a village in Uruan local government area of Akwa Ibom state in Nigeria.
