= Eno Ebenso =

Nigerian researcher (born 1964)

Professor Eno Ebenso FAAS
- Born: 18 November 1964 (age 61); Okobo, Nigeria
- Education: University of Calabar (BSc, 1986); University of Ibadan (MSc, 1990); University of Calabar (PhD, 2004)
- Alma mater: University of Calabar, Nigeria
- Scientific career
- Fields: Corrosion inhibitor
- Institutions: University of South Africa; North-West University; University of Calabar

Eno E. Ebenso (born 18 November 1964) is a Professor of Physical Chemistry who specialises in corrosion inhibition.

== Early life and education ==
Eno Ebenso was born on 18 November 1964 in the Okobo local government area of Akwa Ibom State, Nigeria. Ebenso obtained an BSc Honours in Chemistry from the University of Calabar, Nigeria in 1986, MSc in Physical Chemistry from the University of Ibadan, Nigeria in 1990, and a PhD in Physical Chemistry from the University of Calabar, Nigeria in 2004.

== Career ==
Eno Ebenso embarked on his teaching career at the University of Calabar in Nigeria in 1990, assuming the role of an Assistant Lecturer. Over the years, he received promotions and advanced through the academic ranks, becoming a Lecturer II in 1993, Lecturer I in 1997, and Senior Lecturer in 2001. In 2005, he pursued a postdoctoral fellowship at the Institute of Materials Research, Technical University of Darmstadt in Germany. Additionally, in 2006, he took a sabbatical leave at the Department of Chemistry, University of Uyo, Nigeria.

Subsequently, Ebenso transitioned to the Department of Chemistry and Chemical Technology at the National University of Lesotho in South Africa. However, his academic journey led him to the North-West University's Mafikeng Campus in South Africa, where he joined as a Full Professor of Physical Chemistry in the Department of Chemistry in 2009. During his tenure at the university, he assumed various administrative roles, including Subject Chair in Chemistry, Director of the School of Mathematical and Physical Sciences, Executive Dean of the Faculty of Agriculture, Science and Technology, and Acting Director of the Material Science Innovation and Modelling Research Focus Area (MaSIM). Furthermore, he briefly served as the Acting Vice-Rector (Research and Planning) at the North-West University's Mafikeng Campus. Until 31 December 2019, he held the position of Executive Dean of the Faculty of Natural and Agricultural Sciences at the entire North-West University.

== Research ==
Ebenso's research interests include corrosion, adsorption, inorganic chemistry, electrochemistry, and Langmuir adsorption model. Ebenso is a known authority on chemistry of corrosion and has published extensively in the area of corrosion inhibition chemistry. As of June 2023, He has an H-Index of 98 and over 31000 citations. He has a citation impact of 1% above the world average; he is the most prolific author in the field of corrosion inhibition world wide and has the fifth most downloads of his publications globally in the field of corrosion inhibition.
