= Ibikpe =

- Village
- Country: Nigeria
- State: Akwa Ibom
- Local Government Area: Uruan

Ibikpe is a village in Uruan local government area of Akwa Ibom state in Nigeria.
