= Ikot Udo =

- Village
- Location in Nigeria
- Coordinates: 4.656°N 7.740°E
- Country: Nigeria
- State: Akwa Ibom
- Local Government Area: Uruan

Ikot Udo is a village in Uruan local government area of Akwa Ibom state in Nigeria.
