= Ikot Akpa-Ekang =

- Village
- Country: Nigeria
- State: Akwa Ibom
- Local Government Area: Uruan

Ikot Akpa-Ekang is a village in Uruan local government area of Akwa Ibom state in Nigeria.

== Location ==
It is a rural area in the Southern Uruan District.
