= Anakpa =

- Village
- Interactive map of Anakpa
- Country: Nigeria
- State: Akwa Ibom
- Local Government Area: Uruan

Anakpa is a village in the Uruan Local Government Area of Akwa Ibom State, Nigeria. The Ibibio people inhabit Anakpa village.
