= Ekpene Ukim =

- Village
- Location in Nigeria
- Coordinates: 4°54′23″N 8°02′11″E
- Country: Nigeria
- State: Akwa Ibom
- Local Government Area: Uruan

Ekpene Ukim is a village in Uruan local government area of Akwa Ibom State, Nigeria. The Ibibio people are occupants of the Ekpene Ukim village.
