= Ini, Nigeria =

Ini
- LGA
- Interactive map of Ini
- Location in Nigeria
- Coordinates: 5°24′0″N 7°44′0″E
- Country: Nigeria
- State: Akwa Ibom State
- Capital: Odoro Ikpe

Government
  - Chairman: Mr. Idaisin Israel

Area
  - Total: 406.9 km^{2} (157.1 sq mi)

Population (2022)
  - Total: 126,400
  - Density: 310.6/km^{2} (804.6/sq mi)
- Time zone: UTC+1 (WAT)

Ini is located in the south of Nigeria and is a local government area of Akwa Ibom State.

The location of the Ini Local Government Area covers the former Ikono Local Government Area and Abia State. It has a land area of 320,451 square kilometres.

== People ==
The people of Ini Local Government area are members of the Ibibio people. Ibibio, Itu Mbon Uso and Nkari languages are spoken. As of 2006, the population is 99,196 in total with 52,644 male and 46,552 female residents.

== Natural Resources ==
Natural resources found within Ini include limestone, clay, gravel, fine sand, crude oil, gold and iron ore. The forest region provides timber and firewood.

== Commerce ==
Ini is known as the food basket of Akwa Ibom State. Due to Ini's land expansive area, the citizens are predominantly farmers. Ini produces food items such as rice, palm produce, cassava, cocoa, plantains, and bananas. There is potential for agricultural expansion and increased hunting.

== Traditional Administration of Ini Local Government Area ==
The Ini Local Government is made up of Ikpe Clan, Ikono Clan, Iwerre Clan, Itu Mbon Uso Clan and Nkari Clan. Nkari, Itu Mbonu Uso and Iwerre Clan have ten gazetted and recognized villages each, while Ikpe Clan and Ikono Clan have 52 and 43 villages gazetted and officially recognized villages each. (Source: List of Recognized Villages and Clan, Akwa Ibom State Official Gazette, 2006).

The local government area of Ini consists of ekpuks (lineages/macro-families) which make up autonomous, recognized and gazetted villages/communities. The communities/villages are grouped into one of the five clans of Ikono, Ikpe, Iwerri, Itu Mbon Uso and Nkari. The clans made up the local government.

The Akwa Ibom State Traditional Rulers law, cap 134 laws of Akwa Ibom State and the gazettes published pursuant thereto clearly list all the recognized villages/communities and the grouped clans. The system of traditional administration in Ini Local Government Area is the same as other Local Government Areas in Akwa Ibom State that also follow the ancient Ibibio Political System, where the highest political system was the Community (Obio/Idung) which had an autonomous Obong Idung or Obong Obio or Obong Ikpaisong. Several communities with close blood affinity usually formed a confederation and cooperation for the purposes of cultural and mutual cooperation in defense, commerce, and cultural championship. These inter-communal union of communities with blood relation is today recognized as a clan. The clans today have official clan heads who are selected by the recognized traditional rulers of the communities/villages from among themselves. The traditional rulers' law restricts the authority of every traditional ruler to his gazetted village/community and forbids interference of any traditional ruler in the administration of any other autonomous or gazetted village/community.

The paramount ruler is the president of the Council of Traditional Rulers in the local government. He is selected by the Clan Heads from amongst themselves. Thus, a Traditional Ruler is firstly the King or Ruler of his recognized village/community, before he can vie to be elected to the office of the clan head and further vie to be elected as paramount ruler. Thus if a paramount ruler loses his throne as a traditional ruler of his Community/villages, he automatically ceases to be a clan head and thus ceases to be a paramount ruler. Royalty in Ini Local Government Area resides in the ancient royal thrones which are in each of the autonomous and gazetted villages/communities.

When a paramount ruler joins his ancestors, another clan head is elected to occupy the office of the Paramount Ruler from among the existing recognized clan heads after the burial of the deceased paramount ruler. The paramount ruler is, therefore, the first amongst equals in the royal thrones of Ini Local Government Area.

The current Paramount Ruler of Ini Local Government Area is His Royal Majesty, Edidem Apostle Nteong Udo Effiong Akpan (Who is also the Clan Head of Itu Mbon Uso). The list of recognized Traditional Rulers of all the Communities/Villages and the Clans Heads are contained in the register kept at the State Ministry of Local Government and Chieftaincy Affairs.

== Political Wards ==
Wards	Ward Centers
Ikpe 1	Primary School, Odoro Ikpe
Ikpe 2	Primary Sch., Ikpe Ikot Nkon
Ikpe 3	Primary Sch., Ekoi Ikot Abia/Ikot Ofon
Itu Mbonuso	Anana Omong
Nkari	Methodist Sch. Nkari (Barracks)
Iwerre	Primary Sch., Obotme
Ikono North 1	Methodist Sch., Mbiaobong Ikot Udofia
Ikono North 2	Village Council Hall Usuk Ibakesi
Ikono North 3	Methodist P/S, Itak Ikot Obio Ise
Odoro Ukwok	P. C. N. School, Ukwok
Usuk Ukwok	Govt. School, Usuk Ukwok
