= Nung Ikono-Obio =

- Village
- Interactive map of Nung Ikono-Obio
- Country: Nigeria
- State: Akwa Ibom
- Local Government Area: Uruan

Nung Ikono-Obio is a village in Uruan local government area of Akwa Ibom state in Nigeria.
