= Eyo Ufuo =

Eyo Ufuo Eyo-Ufuo
- Village
- Country: Nigeria
- State: Akwa Ibom
- Local Government Area: Urue-Offong/Oruko

Eyo Ufuo is an Oron village in Eyulor community of Urue-Offong/Oruko local government area of Akwa Ibom state in Nigeria.

== History ==
Eyo Ufuo was formed by Ufuo son of Ullor whose father was Ekete Okpo.
