= Nung Oku =

- Village
- Interactive map of Nung Oku
- Country: Nigeria
- State: Akwa Ibom
- Local Government Area: Uruan

Nung Oku is a village in Uruan local government area of Akwa Ibom state in Nigeria.
