= Princess Emem Ibanga =

Nigerian politician

- Born: Emem Ibanga; Nigeria
- Citizenship: Nigerian
- Occupations: Actress, Comedian
- Known for: Nollywood films and comedy roles

Princess Emem Ibanga (born 17 November 1981) is a Nigerian politician, currently serving as the commissioner for Humanitarian Affairs, Akwa Ibom State. She is also known by her traditional title Adiaha Afaha.

== Background ==
Princess is from Ikot Akpabio, Nsit Atai local government area, Akwa Ibom State.

== Education ==
Emem graduated from the University of Uyo with a B.Sc in Political Science and Public Administration and M.Sc in Public Administration from the same university. She is currently pursuing her Doctorate degree in Public Administration from the University of Uyo. She is a Chartered Institute of Public Administration of Nigeria fellow

== Career ==
Princess Ibanga served as the Chairman of Nsit Atai local government area, from 2017 to 2023. In February 2025, she was appointed as the commissioner Humanitarian Affairs by Governor Umo Eno.
