= Ubuo Effiong Ubuo =

Nigerian Politician

Commissioner for Water Resources & Sanitation
- Incumbent
- Assumed office 2025
- Governor: Umo Eno

Personal details
- Party: Peoples Democratic Party

Ubuo Effiong Ubuo (born July 17, 1976), is a Nigerian politician who currently serves as the Commissioner for Water Resources & Sanitation in Akwa Ibom State. He was appointed to this position in February 2025 by Governor Umo Eno.

== Background and personal life ==
Ubuo was born on July 17, 1976, He is from Okobo local government area, Akwa Ibom State.

== Education ==
Effiong has a Bachelor of Science Degree in Microbiology and also Master of Science Degree in Industrial Microbiology.

== Career ==
Before his appointment in February2025, as the commissioner for water resources in Akwa Ibom state, Ubuo held the position of the Chapter Secretary of the Peoples Democratic Party, Okobo Local Government Area. He also served as Councilor representing Ekeya Ward, and also served as a chairman of Okobo Local Government in Akwa Ibom State
