= Ibuot Utan =

- Village
- Country: Nigeria
- State: Akwa Ibom
- Local Government Area: Mbo, Akwa Ibom

Ibuot Utan is an Effiat Village in Mbo local government area of Akwa Ibom state in Nigeria.
