= Eyobiasang =

Eyobiasang Eyo Abia Asang Oro
- Village
- Location in Nigeria
- Country: Nigeria
- State: Akwa Ibom
- Local Government Area: Urue-Offong/Oruko

Eyobiasang is an Oron Village in Urue-Offong/Oruko local government area of Akwa Ibom state in Nigeria. Formed by the children of Abia Essang from the Ubodung clan of the Oron Nation.
