= Ekpene Ibia =

- Village
- Interactive map of Ekpene Ibia
- Country: Nigeria
- State: Akwa Ibom
- Local Government Area: Uruan

Ekpene Ibia is a village in Uruan local government area of Akwa Ibom State, Nigeria. The Ibibio people are occupants of the Ekpene Ibia village.
