= Adadia =

Village in Akwa Ibom State, Nigeria

Coordinates: 4.970°N 8.065°E

Adadia is a town with five villages in Uruan Local Government Area of Akwa Ibom State, Nigeria. Adadia is inhabited by the Ibibio^{1} ^{2}people.

== History and culture ==
The first soil on which Adadia (Itu Obio Amin) lived was Uruan Ekpe in Efut in Southern Cameroon. Obong Ekene Iyitö led them and sailing up the Cross River, settled in the upland forest where Obio Oko (Creek Town) lives until this day.

The five villages who later joined them were:

1) Adiabo

2) Obutöñ

3) Atakpa

4) Nsiduñ

5) Ekpe Oku Atai (otherwise known as Mbarakom)

When Obong Ekene Iyitö died, a silk cotton tree was planted to mark his grave. His son, Iyitö Ekene Iyitö, was named after his grandfather led the next phase of migration and founded Esuk Mbat, which is Esuk Ekpok Ekpa, which is Okoyong Inua Akpa. He named it "Itu Iyitö Ekene."

Obong Iyitö Ekene's team met Efot Abua living at one part of the land leading to Idim Ete Niñ.

When Obong Iyitö Ekene died, his son, Amin Iyitö Ekene, renamed the place "Itu Obio Amin" meaning "Obio Ndito Iyitö Ekene" (Village of the descendants of Iyitö Ekene).

== Adadia name ==
When Obong Amin Iyitö Ekene died, ten young warriors went head hunting for the burial rites as was the custom then. They sailed and landed at Okobo. The Okobo people captured them and allocated them as slaves to their Chiefs.

On some mornings when out from their masters' homes, they would discuss and plan their escape. One eventful evening, the captives decided to escape, they brought out some bottles of intoxicating drink, which they called "onwong otop eköt" and presented to theirs masters who happily accepted, and drank them. Being highly intoxicated they fell asleep. At night, they killed their masters and escaped. The Okobo people mourned and exclaimed "Idia Idia owo nyin." Giving rise to the name Adadia.

Quarrel between Okon Otu Ukpong, an Okoyong son and Mbesembe Otu, led to war, caused Adadia to leave Okoyong for their present abode.

Among those who first left Okoyong for what is now known as Adadia were:

1. Udo Obon

2. Andañ

3. Ema

4. Uma Eyie

5. Udo Obon

6. Mbo Nta

7. Ekanem Akpakan

All these left with their families and on arriving the new found land, they settled at different locations.

Udo Obon: On arrival, founded a market, planted an African oil bean tree (Ukana), buried the ball of a bell (efik nkanika), plus an earthen cup (tombit mbat), and the market was called "Urua Udo Obong."

Andañ: He arrived and founded his market and planted "Udara" tree (African star apple) and the market was called "Urua Ikot Essien Andan."

Umana Eyie: He also arrived and founded his market, planted a silk cotton tree. The market was called "Urua Umana Eyie." It was popularly called "Urua Enwaig Iban."

Mbo Nta: Arrived a founded his market called "Okop Edi Iköñ Ekpañ."

Ekanem Akpakan: On arrival founded his and gave two names "Ikot Oto" & "Ikot Akpakan."

Akpabio Eda later arrived with Iba Etok. Andan was happy because they were the people who stood by them during the war

Iban also arrived and planted "Ewan" tree in his area and called "Ewan Iban." Others who also arrived were Ubom Obio Ema, Oto Akpabio, Ikpoto Iyonko and Onion Ndem.

The three main family units of Adadia which migrated to the new land of Adadia were:

1. Ekpuk Obong Ema from Nung Emuk landed in Akwa Esuk, Adadia otherwise called Esuk Atai.

2. Ekpuk Obong Ubom Obio Ema from Ikot Udo landed and established a beach known as Esuk Ikot Ikpata.

3. Ekpuk Obong Oto Akpabio Eda from Ikot Oto landed at Esuk Atai.

Present day Adadia has come to have gazetted villages within it, which are:

1) Esuk Akpan Ambo (Odoro Enen, Ikot Udo)

2) Afaha Ikot

3) Ibeno

4) Issiet Adadia (Issiet Inua Akpa)

== Headship of Adadia ==
The Headship of Adadia otherwise known as "Obong Adadia" follows a rotational system within the three (3) main outstanding family units namely: Nung Emuk, Ikot Udo & Ikot Ottor in its governance.

When headship returns to a family Unit, the members of such family meets in their general house meeting and select a candidate of their choice and presents to the Council of Village Heads for further screening and acceptance or none acceptance of the candidate to the council.

When approval of a candidate is given by the Council of Chiefs, which normally should be a written note of information to the family Unit concerned, the unit shows appreciation and the candidate introduced to them.

Never at any point in the history of Adadia, had a non-indigene been appointed as "Obong Adadia" even though many live in the many family units.

== Names of "Obong Adadia", year, family unit ==
Obong Obioema (founder Main Beach), Ikot Udo

Obong Oŋwungedi Essien, Ikot Ottor

Obong Akadi, Nung Emuk

Obong Ubom Obioema (The Goddess High Priest), Ikot Udo

Obong Akpakan (Founder of Ekim Enen), Ikot Ottor

Obong Ekanim Ekpo Uta, 1887–1910,

Obong Akpan Effiong Inyang, 1910–1913, Nung Emuk

Obong Umo Okor, 1913–1921, Nung Udatim, Ikot Ottor

Obong Okor Udo, 1922–1924, Ata Essien, Ikot Ottor

Obong Eduok Akpanteng, 1924–1930, Ikot Ekpot, Nung Emuk

Obong Akpan Udo, Nov. 1930–47, Odoro Enen, Ikot Udo

Obong Efiong Etim Akpan Ndon, 1948–1951, Ikot Akpan, Ikot Ottor

Obong Efiong Inyang Udo, 1952–1976, Ikot Enang, Nung Emuk

Obong Ekpenyong Etim Offiong, 1977–1988, Nung Eda, Ikot Udo

Obong Bassey Asukwo Essien, 1989–2001, Ata Essien, Ikot Ottor

Obong Etim Udo Ekaeba, 2002 - date, Ikot Abia Ntem, Nung Emuk
