= Akpa Nkanua =

- Village
- Location in Nigeria
- Coordinates: 5°13′0″N 7°23′0″E
- Country: Nigeria
- State: Akwa Ibom
- Local Government Area: Mbo, Akwa Ibom

Akpa Nkanua is an Effiat Village in Mbo local government area of Akwa Ibom state in Nigeria.
