= Ikot Akpabio =

- Village
- Interactive map of Ikot Akpabio
- Country: Nigeria
- State: Akwa Ibom
- Local Government Area: Nsit-Atai

Ikot Akpabio is a village in Nsit-Atai, a local government area of Akwa Ibom State.
