= Oduonim Oro =

Oduonim Oro Oduonim Oro
- Village
- Location in Nigeria
- Country: Nigeria
- State: Akwa Ibom
- Local Government Area: Urue-Offong/Oruko

Oduonim Oro is an Oron Village in Urue-Offong/Oruko local government area of Akwa Ibom state in Nigeria.
