= Udung Esin =

Udung Esin Udung Esin
- Town
- Country: Nigeria
- State: Akwa Ibom
- Local Government Area: Oron, Akwa Ibom

Udung Esin is an Oron Town in Oron local government area of Akwa Ibom state in Nigeria.
