= Atte Oro =

Atte Atte Oro
- Village
- Country: Nigeria
- State: Akwa Ibom
- Local Government Area: Urue-Offong/Oruko

Atte is an Oron village in Urue-Offong/Oruko local government area of Akwa Ibom state in Nigeria.
