= Udung Ekung II =

- Village
- Country: Nigeria
- State: Akwa Ibom
- Local Government Area: Oron, Akwa Ibom

Udung Ekung II is an Oron Village in Oron local government area of Akwa Ibom state in Nigeria.
