= Idu, Akwa Ibom State =

Idu
- Town, Village
- Interactive map of Idu
- Country: Nigeria
- State: Akwa Ibom
- Local Government Area: Uruan
- Ward: Uruan Central Ward 1

Idu or Edun is both a central village and the headquarters of Uruan local government area of Akwa Ibom state in Nigeria.

Edun is politically segmented to belong to Uruan Central Ward 1.

== Climate ==
In Idu, the wet season is overcast, muggy and warm and the dry season is hot and slightly cloudy. Over the course of the year, the temperature typically varies from 21 °C (70 °F) to 31 °C (87 °F) and is rarely below 17 °C (63 °F) or above 32 °C (90 °F). The month with the fewest muggy days in Idu is January, with 22 ½ days that are muggy or worse.
