= Elei =

Elei Elei
- Village
- Location in Nigeria
- Country: Nigeria
- State: Akwa Ibom
- Local Government Area: Urue-Offong/Oruko

Elei is an Oron village in Urue-Offong/Oruko local government area of Akwa Ibom state in Nigeria.
