= Eyo-Atta =

- Town
- Location in Nigeria
- Country: Nigeria
- State: Akwa Ibom
- Local Government Area: Oron, Akwa Ibom

Eyo Atta is an Oron Town in Oron local government area of Akwa Ibom state in Nigeria.
