= Eyo Nsek =

Eyo Nsek Nsek Oro
- Village
- Location in Nigeria
- Country: Nigeria
- State: Akwa Ibom
- Local Government Area: Udung Uko

Eyo Nsek is an Oron Village in Udung Uko local government area of Akwa Ibom state in Nigeria.
