= Eyotai =

Eyotai Eyo Antai
- Village
- Country: Nigeria
- State: Akwa Ibom
- Local Government Area: Udung Uko

Eyotai or Eyo Atai [also Eyonu Atai] is an Oron-speaking community and one of the biggest villages in Udung Uko local government area (LGA) of Akwa Ibom state in Nigeria. Per the 2006 National Census, Eyotai pooled a numerical strength of 15,387 people out of the total of 53,060, and also by the population projection of 2016, it rose to 21,605 out of 74,500 credited to the entire local government. It has been adjudged as the most densely populated village in the entire Oron nation.

Eyotai is bounded to the north by Eyo Okponung village; to the south by Ukukim Eyo Nsek, Eyo Uliong and Udung Adatang; to the East by the Oron river, and to the West by Udung Esio village. The village boasts a unique landscape which is basically a flat and marsh land river banks, extending to Esuk (beach) Ilong and Esuk Edet Edem.

The village is largely an agrarian one with most of its dwellers engaged in farming and fishing. The beach market at Usung contributes huge revenue to the local administration. It has a morning and evening market, notable of which is the Urue Osung; where the effigy of the late Eke Osung Odu with her soldier grandson is mounted.
