= Urue-Offong/Oruko =

Urue-Offong/Oruko Iyák Oro Oron West
- LGA
- Interactive map of Urue-Offong/Oruko
- Location in Nigeria
- Coordinates: 4°43′N 8°10′E
- Country: Nigeria
- State: Akwa Ibom State
- Capital: Urue Offong Town
- Creation date: 1991

Government
  - Chairman: RT. Hon. Chief Amb Uno Etim Uno

Area
  - Total: 117 km^{2} (45 sq mi)

Population (2022)
  - Total: 90,300
  - Density: 772/km^{2} (2,000/sq mi)
- Time zone: UTC+1 (WAT)
- Postal code: 523
- Area codes: 523107, 523108, 523109, 523110, 523112, 523111.

Urue-Offong/Oruko is located in the south east of Nigeria and is a Local Government Area of Akwa Ibom State created in September 1991.

Urue-Offong/Oruko is one of the five Oro language speaking Local Government Area bounded in the North West by Okobo, Akwa Ibom, Oron, Akwa Ibom in the North East, bounded in the East by Udung Uko, and in the South East by Mbo, Akwa Ibom and also bounded by Esit Eket in the South West.

== History ==
In September 1991, Urue-Offong/Oruko Local Government Area was carved out of Oron, Akwa Ibom Local Government Area. Urue-Offong/Oruko is made up of six out of the nine clans (Afaha) of the Oron people.

Oruko was the economic capital of the Oron people it was a home to a huge market (Urue Oruko) in the 1800s where several traders from mainly Hausa people, Ilaje, and Igbo people came to sell their goods, an unfortunate event occur where several people died close to Sixty after a huge ancestral tree fell and people died due to stampede in the late 1890s. Again in Urue Oruko, several hundred of Oron people (mostly traders and women) were killed during the Nigerian Civil War in the late 1960s. This unfortunate event has been observed in Oron to be the most tragic in the history of the Nigerian Civil War.

== Clans and settlement ==
Afaha Ubodung clan, which is the largest of all the clans, now known as Mbodung District, comprises twenty-one villages and towns:

- Abiak Elibi
- Anai Okpo
- Edok
- Eyetong
- Eyo Eyekip
- Eyo Okwong
- Eyo Ufuo
- Eyo Uwesong
- Eyo Uya
- Eyobiasang
- Eyokpifie
- Eyulor
- Oduonim Isong Inyang
- Oduonim Oro
- Okossi
- Ubodung
- Udung Eta
- Udung Okpor
- Udung Uwe
- Ukuda
- Urue Offong Town

Afaha Ukwong clan, also known as the Ukwong district, is the second largest clan in Urue-Ofong/Oruko. It comprises five villages or towns:

- Ibetong-Eweme
- Ikpe
- Mbukpo-Eyo-Ima
- Mbukpo-Eyakan
- Mbukpo-Uko-Akai.

Afaha Ibighi clan, also known as Ibighi district, comprises four villages or towns:

- Okuku Township
- Oyuku Ibighi
- Uya Oron
- Eyubia anglicised (Oyubia).

Afaha Okuiso clan, also known as Okuiso district, comprises two villages or towns:

- Atte Oro
- Umume

Afaha Ebughu clan, also known as Ebughu district, comprises two villages or towns:

- Elei
- Ibetong Nsie

Afaha Okpo clan, also known as Afaha district, comprises two villages or towns:

- Afaha Okpo Town
- Uboro Oro

== Geography ==
Urue-Offong/Oruko is in the tropical region and has a uniformly high temperature all the year round. The two main seasons are the dry which spans between October and April and wet season which starts around May and ends in September. There are also two prevailing winds – the South-West onshore winds which brings heavy rains and the North- East trade winds blowing across the Sahara Desert, which brings in the dry season.

== Natural Resources/People ==
The people are traditionally fishermen, traders and farmers. Although very rich in sea-foods, palm oil and farm crops, the area is also rich in crude oil, much wells, it ranks among the richest in crude oil deposits found in Oro, Mbo, Okobo, Oron and Udung Uko. The other sister Local Government Areas in Oro nation are said to have 92, 86, 66 and 39 such wells respectively, even though actual oil exploration is going on in Mbo. The area also has a large deposit of clay and other solid minerals like gravel, fine stones, silica sand, etc.

== Kingship ==
Ancient Urue-Offong/Oruko were governed by each Family head who settles every family issues among the family. And this family head in turns represent each family in the Village traditional court, and in turns a Village Head (Offong) is being chosen which is rotatory in the Village Court to represent their Village in the community setting.

Today Traditionally, the Urue Offong people have one king that rules over the land. He is known as the Ahta Oro. The Ahta has all the Ofong (Ivong or Ifong) afaha and the paramount rulers as members of his traditional rulers council. Some high chiefs (for example, Ikpoto, Akpaha and Okete Okete) are also recognized by the Ahta's council. The President-General of the Oron Union worldwide is regarded as the administrative head of the Oron nation and second-in-command at the Ahta's traditional rulers council.

== Prominent People ==
Professor Okon Edet Uya. (12 June 1947 – 17 April 2014) was briefly the chairman of the National Electoral Commission of Nigeria (NECON), appointed by President Ibrahim Babangida after the presidential elections of the 12 June 1993 had been annulled and the previous chairman, Humphrey Nwosu, dismissed. Uya was of Oron origins. He spent six years as a senior official in Nigeria's diplomatic corps, serving as Nigeria's ambassador in Argentina, Peru, Paraguay and Chile. When a professor of history at the University of Calabar, Uya was appointed to conduct a new presidential poll after the annulment of the 12 June 1993 election.

Sir (Ambassador) Etim Jack Okpoyo (First Deputy Governor of Akwa Ibom State, Engineer, businessman and politician).

Late Elder Bassey Jack (Unanaowi) Okpoyo (First Electrical Engineer in Akwa Ibom State and the first man to own a Petrol or Fueling station in Old Cross River State)

Late Comrade Edet Bassey Etienam MFR JP (Foremost Trade Unionist, Two Term Parliamentarian and Philanthropist)

== See also ==
- Oron people
- Oron, Akwa Ibom
- Mbo, Akwa Ibom
- Okobo, Akwa Ibom
- Udung Uko
- Obolo people
- Akwa Ibom State
- Oron Nation
