= Eyo Ekung Inyang =

Eyo Ekung Inyang Ekung Inyang
- Town
- Country: Nigeria
- State: Akwa Ibom
- Local Government Area: Oron, Akwa Ibom

Eyo Ekung Inyang is an Oron Village in Oron local government area of Akwa Ibom state in Nigeria.
