= Mbukpo-Eyo-Ima =

Mbokpu-Eyo-Ima Eyo Ima
- Village
- Country: Nigeria
- State: Akwa Ibom
- Local Government Area: Urue-Offong/Oruko

Government
  - Village Head: HRH(Offong) Edet willie Okituneng

Mbukpo-Eyo-Ima is a village in Urue-Offong/Oruko local government area of Akwa Ibom state in Nigeria.
