= Aliyu Attah =

Nigerian police chief

Aliyu Atta

8th Inspector General of Police
- In office 1990–1993
- Preceded by: Muhammadu Gambo Jimeta
- Succeeded by: Ibrahim Coomassie

Personal details
- Born: 12 May 1937 (age 89) Okene, Kogi State, Nigeria
- Party: Non partisian

Aliyu Atta // was a Nigerian policeman and Inspector General of Police. He was appointed in 1990 to succeed Muhammadu Gambo Jimeta and was succeeded by Ibrahim Coomassie in 1993.
