= Udung Eyo =

Udung Eyo Udung Eyo
- Community
- Country: Nigeria
- State: Akwa Ibom
- Local Government Area: Mbo, Akwa Ibom

Udung Eyo is an Oron Community in Mbo local government area of Akwa Ibom state in Nigeria.
