= Urue Offong Town =

Urue Offong Town Urue Offong
- Town
- Location in Nigeria
- Country: Nigeria
- State: Akwa Ibom
- Local Government Area: Urue-Offong/Oruko

Urue Offong Town is an Oron town and also the capital of Urue-Offong/Oruko local government area of Akwa Ibom state in Nigeria.
