= Inua Abasi =

- Community
- Location in Nigeria
- Country: Nigeria
- State: Akwa Ibom
- Local Government Area: Mbo, Akwa Ibom

Inua Abasi is an Effiat Community in the Mbo local government area of Akwa Ibom state in Nigeria.
