= Eyo-Oyete =

Eyo-Oyete Eyo Oyo Ette
- Town
- Country: Nigeria
- State: Akwa Ibom
- Local Government Area: Oron, Akwa Ibom

Eyo-Oyete is an Oron Town in Oron local government area of Akwa Ibom state in Nigeria.
