= Ikwita =

Iquita Ikwita
- Town
- Location in Nigeria
- Country: Nigeria
- State: Akwa Ibom
- Local Government Area: Oron, Akwa Ibom

Iquita is an Oron Community in Oron local government area of Akwa Ibom state in Nigeria.
