= Eyo Eyekip =

Eyo Eyekip Eyo Eyo-Okip
- Village
- Country: Nigeria
- State: Akwa Ibom
- Local Government Area: Urue-Offong/Oruko

Eyo Eyekip is an Oron Village in Urue-Offong/Oruko local government area of Akwa Ibom state in Nigeria. Formed by the children of Okip from the Ubodung clan of Oron Nation.
