= Adaeba =

Adaeba Ada-eba-Oro
- Village
- Country: Nigeria
- State: Akwa Ibom
- Local Government Area: Mbo, Akwa Ibom

Adaeba is an Oron Village in Mbo local government area of Akwa Ibom state in Nigeria.
