= Asiok Obufa =

- Village
- Country: Nigeria
- State: Akwa Ibom
- Local Government Area: Mbo, Akwa Ibom

Asiok Obufa is an Effiat Village in Mbo local government area of Akwa Ibom state in Nigeria.
