= Uno Etim Uno =

Nigerian politician

Uno Etim Uno is a Nigerian politician from Akwa Ibom State. He was appointed as the Commissioner for Environment and Mineral Resources Akwa Ibom State, by Governor Udom Emmanuel.

== Background ==
Uno is from Urue Offong Oruko Local Government Area, Akwa Ibom State.

== Career ==
In 2024, he resigned as Commissioner to become the Chairman of Urue Offong Oruko Local Government Area, Akwa Ibom State. He is a member of the Peoples Democratic Party (PDP).
