= Utit Uruan =

- Village
- Interactive map of Utit Uruan
- Country: Nigeria
- State: Akwa Ibom
- Local Government Area: Uruan

Utit Uruan is a village in Uruan local government area of Akwa Ibom state in Nigeria.
