= Eyo Okponung =

Eyo Okponung Okponung
- Village
- Country: Nigeria
- State: Akwa Ibom
- Local Government Area: Udung Uko

Eyo Okponung is an Oron Village in Udung Uko local government area of Akwa Ibom state in Nigeria.
