= Eyo-Odiong =

- Town
- Country: Nigeria
- State: Akwa Ibom
- Local Government Area: Oron, Akwa Ibom

Eyo Odiong is an Oron Town in Oron local government area of Akwa Ibom state in Nigeria.
