= Oyuku Ibighi =

Oyuku Ibighi Oyuku
- Town
- Country: Nigeria
- State: Akwa Ibom
- Local Government Area: Urue-Offong/Oruko

Oyuku is an Oron town in Urue-Offong/Oruko local government area of Akwa Ibom state in Nigeria.
