= Uya Oron =

Uya Oron Uya Oro
- Town
- Country: Nigeria
- State: Akwa Ibom
- Local Government Area: Urue-Offong/Oruko Oron, Akwa Ibom

Uya Oron is an Oron town in Urue-Offong/Oruko and Oron, Akwa Ibom local government area of Akwa Ibom state in Nigeria.
