= Uboro Isong Inyang =

Uboro Isong Inyang Isong Inyang
- Village
- Location in Nigeria
- Country: Nigeria
- State: Akwa Ibom
- Local Government Area: Udung Uko

Uboro Isong Inyang is an Oron Village in Udung Uko, local government area of Akwa Ibom state in Nigeria.
