= Eyokpifie =

Eyokpifie Eyo-Okpi Efie Oro
- Village
- Country: Nigeria
- State: Akwa Ibom
- Local Government Area: Urue-Offong/Oruko

Eyokpifie is an Oron Village in Urue-Offong/Oruko local government area of Akwa Ibom state in Nigeria. Formed by the children of Okpi Efie who originated among the Ubodung clan of Oron Nation.
