= Ubodung =

Ubodung Ubodung Oro
- Village
- Location in Nigeria
- Country: Nigeria
- State: Akwa Ibom
- Local Government Area: Urue-Offong/Oruko

Ubodung is an Oron Village in Urue-Offong/Oruko local government area of Akwa Ibom state in Nigeria named after the clan Ubodung.
