= Udung Eta =

Udung Eta Eta
- Village
- Country: Nigeria
- State: Akwa Ibom
- Local Government Area: Urue-Offong/Oruko

Udung Eta is an Oron Village in Urue-Offong/Oruko local government area of Akwa Ibom state in Nigeria named after Eta from the clan Ubodung.
