= Akwa Obio Effiat =

- Town
- Location in Nigeria
- Coordinates: 8°20′20.80″N 4°35′40.96″E
- Country: Nigeria
- State: Akwa Ibom
- Local Government Area: Mbo, Akwa Ibom

Akwa Obio Effiat is an Effiat Town in Mbo local government area of Akwa Ibom state in Nigeria.
