= Sunday Mbang =

Nigerian pastor (1936–2023)

Sunday Coffie Mbang
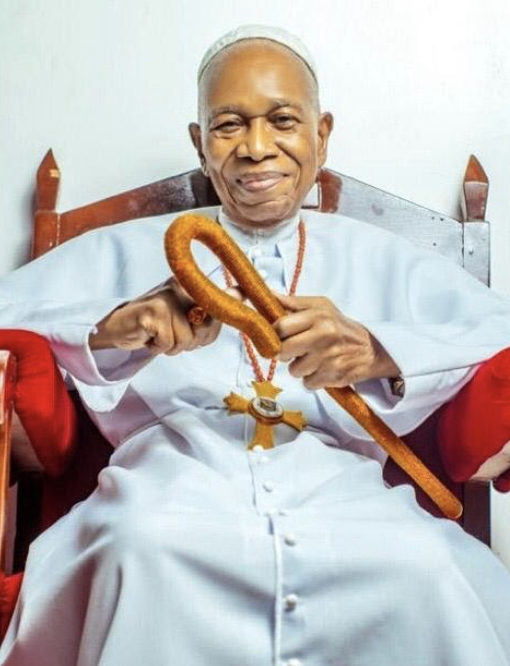
- Born: 26 August 1936; Akwa Ibom State, British Nigeria
- Died: 16 May 2023 (aged 86)
- Occupation: Minister of Religion
- Employer(s): Methodist Church Nigeria, University of Ibadan, Christian Association of Nigeria, World Methodist Council
- Spouse: Enobong Sunday Mbang (m. 1978)

Sunday Coffie Mbang (26 August 1936 – 16 May 2023) was a Nigerian, prelate of Methodist Church Nigeria. He served as President of the World Methodist Council and National President of the Christian Association of Nigeria.

== Early life and education ==
Sunday Mbang was born in Idua Eket, Eket Local Government Area of Akwa Ibom State of the Federal Republic of Nigeria on 26 August 1936. He was born into very humble and Christian family.

Mbang studied in the Effoi Group School, Salvation Army School, Akai-Ubium, Government School, Eket, Methodist Boys’ High School, Oron, Teacher's College, Uzuakoli, Trinity Theological College, Umuahia, University of Ibadan, Hebrew University of Jerusalem, and Harvard University, USA.

== Ministry ==
Mbang became a minister in 1961. He went through theological education and training in Nigeria and overseas. He became a Pastor and Minister of Religion in 1962 in Methodist Church Nigeria and rose through the ranks to be elected into the Episcopal rank, Bishop of Tinubu, Lagos State in 1979 and later was elevated to the position of Patriarch/Prelate, the administrative and pastoral head and leader of the entire Methodist Church family in Nigeria in 1984, a position he held for twenty-two years. For many of his working years as teacher, evangelist and pastor, he held a number of positions outside that of Methodist Church Nigeria, namely; the National President of the Christian Association of Nigeria, the co-chairman of the Nigeria Inter-Religious Council, and the Vice and Chairperson of the World Methodist Council for many years.

== Death ==
Sunday Mbang died on 16 May 2023, at the age of 86.

== Awards and recognition ==
- World Methodist Council Peace Award
- Commander of the Order of Niger (CON)
- Honorary Doctor of Divinity from Baptist Seminary, Ogbomosho, Oyo State
- Honorary Doctor of Divinity from the University of Nigeria Nsukka, Nsukka, Enugu State
