= Eyo-Okpo-Oyo =

Eyo Okpoyo Eyo-Okpo-Oyo
- Town
- Country: Nigeria
- State: Akwa Ibom
- Local Government Area: Oron, Akwa Ibom

Eyo Okpoyo is an Oron Town in Oron local government area of Akwa Ibom state in Nigeria.
