= Eyo-Ifang =

Eyo-Ifang Eyo Ifang
- Town
- Country: Nigeria
- State: Akwa Ibom
- Local Government Area: Oron, Akwa Ibom

Eyo Ifang is an Oron Town in Oron local government area of Akwa Ibom state in Nigeria.
