= Eniongo =

Eniongo Eniongo Oro
- Community
- Location in Nigeria
- Country: Nigeria
- State: Akwa Ibom
- Local Government Area: Udung Uko

Eniongo is an Oron community in the Udung Uko local government area of Akwa Ibom state in Nigeria.
