= Udung Usotia =

Udung Usotai
- Town
- Country: Nigeria
- State: Akwa Ibom
- Local Government Area: Oron, Akwa Ibom

Udung Usotai is an Oron Town in Oron local government area of Akwa Ibom state in Nigeria.
