= Eyofin =

Eyofin Eyofin Oro
- Town
- Location in Nigeria
- Country: Nigeria
- State: Akwa Ibom
- Local Government Area: Udung Uko
- Time zone: UTC+1 (West Africa Time)

Eyofin is an Oron Town and the Capital of Udung Uko local government area of Akwa Ibom state in Nigeria.

== Climate ==
In Eyofin, the wet season is overcast and warm, the dry season is hot and mostly cloudy, and it is oppressive year round, the best time of year to visit Eyofin for general outdoor tourist activities is from early December to late January, with a peak score in the last week of December.
