= Nsit-Atai =

- LGA
- Interactive map of Nsit-Atai
- Nsit Atai Local government area was created in 1996 with its capital at Odot by the government of president Sani Abacha. It has an area of about 17,000 square kilometres, with 62 villages.
- Coordinates: 4°51′0″N 8°01′0″E
- Country: Nigeria
- State: Akwa Ibom State
- Capital: Odot

Government
  - Chairman: Prince Anthony Nyong

Area
  - Total: 149.3 km^{2} (57.6 sq mi)

Population (2022)
  - Total: 93,700
  - Density: 628/km^{2} (1,630/sq mi)
- Time zone: UTC+1 (WAT)

Nsit Atai Local government area was created in the year 1996 with its capital at Odot by the government of Gen. Sani Abacha. It has an area of out of an about 17,000 square kilometres, with 62 villages.

== Location ==
Nsit Atai is located in south east Akwa Ibom State of Nigeria and is a local government area of Akwa Ibom state. It is approximately 50 kilometres (31 mi) from Uyo, the capital of Akwa Ibom state. It is bounded in the north by Uruan, in the east by Okobo, in the west by Ibesikpo Asutan Ekpe Local Government Area. It is on the Coordinates: 4°51′0″N 8°01′0″E

== Government and politics ==
- Representative: Rt. Hon. Mark Esset
- Paramount Ruler: HRH Edidem Peter Okon Effiong
- Chairman: Rt. Hon. Emem Ibanga

=== Politics ===
The current chairman of Nsit Atai Local Government Area is Rt. Hon. Emem Ibanga. She is the first female chairman of the Local Government Area and a two term chairman. She is from Ikot Akpabio Village in Afaha Ndisiak which is a sub-clan of the Afaha clan. She holds a bachelor's degree in political science and public administration. In 2020, she was suspended for gross misconduct of funds but was later reinstated by the Akwa Ibom State House assembly.

== People ==
Nsit Atai People are Ibibio outlined extraction with Ibibio language as the main spoken language. Cultural influences include Ekpo, Ekong, Eko-ong Utah, Egre and other traditional dances.

== List of villages in Nsit Atai ==
- Adia Nsit
- Akpang Offop
- Etobodom
- Ibakang
- Ibedu
- Ibiakpan
- Idiaba
- Idifa
- Idikpa
- Idikpa Ikot Ntung
- Ikot Abasi
- Ikot Abiaenyie
- Ikot Abiyan
- Ikot Akpabio
- Ikot Akpan Ike
- Ikot Asua
- Ikot Ebita
- Ikot Edebe
- Ikot Edong
- Ikot Eket
- Ikot Ekpot
- Ikot Esen
- Ikot Esop
- Ikot Essien
- Ikot Inyang
- Ikot Itie-Udong
- Ikot Mkpo
- Ikot Nkpene
- Ikot Ntuen
- Ikot Obon Nsit
- Ikot Otu
- Ikot Ubok Udom
- Ikot Udofia
- Ikot Ukpong
- Ikot Uyo Nsit
- Iwok Atai
- Iwok Nsit
- Iwok Obio Aduang
- Nda Nsit
- Ndisiak
- Ndon Ekpe
- Ndon Ikot Itie-Udung
- Ndon Omun
- Odot No.1
- Odot No.2
- Odot No.3
- Okoro Atai
- Okoro Nsit
- Ubetim
- Udofia
- Unyehe Nsit

== Population ==
According to the 2006 census result, Nsit Atai has a population of 37,318 male and 74,595 females. This is a total of 101,915 people.

== Education ==
Nsit Atai Local Government Area has decent levels of educational institutions. They are pre-primary, primary and secondary schools. There are 13 pre-primary schools, 25 primary schools, 9 secondary schools and 26 adult education centers. Most of the schools are in decaying and deplorable conditions. The teacher to student ratio is 1:50 students per class.

The local government houses the Permanent site of the National Youth Service Corps camp in Akwa Ibom State.

== Health ==
Nsit Atai has one comprehensive health care center, one primary health center and two health posts. Some of the centers have been adequately equipped in terms of physical structures, facilities/equipment and personnel.

== Natural resources ==
Mineral resources include crude oil deposits, commercial quantity of salt and high quality clay.

Agricultural resources include plantain oil palm and palm produce. There is a preponderance of hardwood, timber, and wildlife. Agriculture provides employment and means of livelihood to the people of Nsit Atai. The land is generally fertile but the fertility rate is very low due to continuous activities which results in low productivity, income and low standard of living.

== Commerce ==
Most people have jobs as farmers and sundry traders.

== Political Wards ==
Wards	Ward Centers
Eastern Nsit 1	Primary School, Odot
Eastern Nsit 2	Primary School, Iwok
Eastern Nsit 3	Primary School, Ubetim
Eastern Nsit 4	Primary School, Ndon Omum
Eastern Nsit 5	Primary School, Ikot Itie Udung
Eastern Nsit 6	Primary School, Ikot Edebe
Eastern Nsit 7	Primary School, Ibedu
Eastern Nsit 8	Primary School, Okoro Atai
Eastern Nsit 9	Primary School, Ikot Ukpong
Eastern Nsit 10	Primary School, Nda Nsit
