= Enino =

Enino Enino
- Village
- Location in Nigeria
- Country: Nigeria
- State: Akwa Ibom
- Local Government Area: Udung Uko

Enino is an Oron Village in Udung Uko local government area of Akwa Ibom state in Nigeria.
