= Eyobiosio =

Eyobiosio Eyo Obio Esio
- Community
- Country: Nigeria
- State: Akwa Ibom
- Local Government Area: Udung Uko

Eyobiosio is an Oron community in Udung Uko local government area of Akwa Ibom state in Nigeria.
