= Ekim-Enen =

- Village
- Interactive map of Ekim-Enen
- Country: Nigeria
- State: Akwa Ibom
- Local Government Area: Uruan

Ekim-Enen is a village in Uruan local government area of Akwa Ibom State, Nigeria. The Ibibio people are occupants of the Ekim-Enen village.
