= Eye Oko =

Eye Oko Eyo Oko
- Village
- Country: Nigeria
- State: Akwa Ibom
- Local Government Area: Udung Uko

Eye Oko is an Oron village in Udung Uko local government area of Akwa Ibom state in Nigeria.
