= Eyo Efai =

Eyo Efai Eyo Efai
- Village
- Location in Nigeria
- Country: Nigeria
- State: Akwa Ibom
- Local Government Area: Mbo, Akwa Ibom

Eyo Efai is an Oron Village in Mbo local government area of Akwa Ibom state in Nigeria.
