= Eyo Ukut =

Eyo Ukut Eyo Ukut
- Village
- Country: Nigeria
- State: Akwa Ibom
- Local Government Area: Mbo, Akwa Ibom

Eyo Ukut is an Oron Village in Mbo local government area of Akwa Ibom state in Nigeria.
