= Eyokponung =

Eyokponung Eyo Ukpong Nung
- Community
- Country: Nigeria
- State: Akwa Ibom
- Local Government Area: Udung Uko

Eyokponung is an Oron community in Udung Uko local government area of Akwa Ibom state in Nigeria.
