= Esuk Odu =

- Village
- Country: Nigeria
- State: Akwa Ibom
- Local Government Area: Uruan

Esuk Odu is a village in Uruan local government area of Akwa Ibom state, Nigeria. Esuk Odu primarily speaks Ibibio. The most prominent industries in Esuk Odu are agriculture and fishing.
