= Eyo Obiosio =

Eyo Obiosio Eyo Obio Esio
- Town
- Country: Nigeria
- State: Akwa Ibom
- Local Government Area: Oron, Akwa Ibom

Eyo Obiosio is an Oron Town in Oron local government area of Akwa Ibom state in Nigeria.
