= Ukko-Pekka (disambiguation) =

Ukko-Pekka was the nickname of Finnish president Pehr Evind Svinhufvud.

Ukko-Pekka may also refer to:

- Ukko-Pekka Luukkonen (born 1999), Finnish ice hockey player
- Ukko-Pekka (locomotive), the nickname of VR Class Hr1, a steam locomotive built in Finland

== See also ==
- Ukko (disambiguation)
