= Udung Osin =

Udung Osin Udung Osin
- Town
- Country: Nigeria
- State: Akwa Ibom
- Local Government Area: Oron, Akwa Ibom

Esin Ufot is an Oron town in the Oron local government area of Akwa Ibom State, Nigeria.
