= Ibete =

Ibete Ibete Oro
- Village
- Location in Nigeria
- Country: Nigeria
- State: Akwa Ibom
- Local Government Area: Mbo, Akwa Ibom

Ibete is an Oron Village in Mbo local government area of Akwa Ibom state in Nigeria.
