= Abidina Coomassie =

Nigerian journalist and newspaper publisher

Abidina Coomassie was a Nigerian journalist and newspaper publisher.

Coomassie founded Today's Communications Ltd, publishers of defunct Today, a daily newspaper, the weekly Abuja Mirror and the Hausa language, A Yau.

He was born to the family of Ahmadu Coomassie, an administrator and Permanent Secretary in Northern Region, Nigeria. He was a brother to former Police chief, Ibrahim Coomassie. As a journalist, he began his career working at Ghana Broadcasting Service during Kwame Nkrumah's administration, after leaving Ghana, he joined FRCN Radio, Kaduna and later covered the Nigerian Civil War where he came into contact with young soldiers who will later take on more political roles.

Inspired by Eddy Shah's Today, Coomassie launched his Today newspaper in 1996, another brand Abuja Mirror was a pro-Abacha newspaper that briefly led local news publications within the federal capital before Abacha's death, thereafter, it veered towards a critical tone. An enigmatic journalist, in 1993, he swore to an affidavit alleging previous corrupt practices by then NRC presidential candidate, Bashir Tofa and during the administration of Sani Abacha, he became a close associate of the general.

Coomassie died in 2001.
