= Udung Okwong =

- Town
- Country: Nigeria
- State: Akwa Ibom
- Local Government Area: Oron, Akwa Ibom

Udung Ukwong is an Oron Community in Oron local government area of Akwa Ibom state in Nigeria.
