= Ukko (disambiguation) =

Ukko was a god in Finnish mythology.

Ukko may also refer to:

- Ukko (island), a lake island in Lapland, Finland
- Ukko Happonen (born 2007), Finnish footballer
- Ukko Hietala (1904–1990), Finnish pentathlete
- Ukko Peltonen (born 1998), Finnish cyclist
- 2020 Ukko, an asteroid
- Winter Storm Ukko, a March 2013 weather event in the United States

== See also ==
- Ukko-Pekka (disambiguation)
- Uko (disambiguation)
