= Muhammadu Gambo Jimeta =

Nigerian police chief

Coordinator of National Security
- In office January 1990 – 2 January 1993
- President: Ibrahim Babangida
- Preceded by: Office Established
- Succeeded by: Aliyu Mohammed Gusau

7th Inspector General of Police
- In office 1986–1990
- Preceded by: Etim Inyang
- Succeeded by: Aliyu Attah

Personal details
- Born: 15 April 1937 Jimeta, British Nigeria
- Died: 21 January 2021 (aged 83) Abuja, Nigeria
- Resting place: Gudu Cemetery, Abuja
- Party: Non partisan

Muhammadu Gambo Jimeta (15 April 1937 - 21 January 2021) was a former Inspector General of the Nigeria Police Force. He was appointed in 1986 to succeed Etim Inyang and was succeeded by Aliyu Attah in 1990. He was later Coordinator of National Security to President of Nigeria Ibrahim Babangida.

== Early life and education ==
He was born in Jimeta on 15 April 1937. Gambo attended Jimeta Elementary School (1947–49) and Yola Middle School (1950–55) for his early education. Thereafter, he went to Bauchi Provincial Secondary School (1956–58) and Government College Keffi (1958–59), before attending Nigeria Police College Kaduna (1959) and Police College Ikeja (1959). He also attended Detective Training School, Wakefield, UK (1962), Bramhill Police College UK (1963), International Police Academy, Washington DC, USA (1980) and National Police Academy, Cairo, Egypt.

== Career ==
After leaving the police college, Gambo began his career as a Cadet sub-Inspector. In 1963, he was promoted to Assistant Superintendent of Police (ASP). He became a Deputy Superintendent of Police (DSP) in 1967 and full superintendent in 1969.

In 1972, he was promoted to Chief Superintendent of Police and became an Assistant Commissioner of Police in 1974. He became Commissioner of Police in 1977 and served in Lagos, where he got national fame as a crack police officer dealing with robberies in the state.

In 1982, he was promoted AIG and transferred to Force Criminal Investigation Division, Alagbon Close, Lagos. He became a DIG in 1984 and Inspector General of Police in 1986.

== Post-retirement ==
In 2011, the then President Goodluck Jonathan appointed Alhaji Mohammed Gambo Jimeta as a member of the Presidential Advisory Committee on Prerogative of Mercy. He died on Thursday 21 January 2021.
