= Ekiebong =

- Village
- Country: Nigeria
- State: Akwa Ibom
- Local Government Area: Mbo, Akwa Ibom

Ekiebong is an Oron Village located in Mbo local government area of Akwa Ibom state in Nigeria.
