= Mbukpo-Eyakan =

Mbukpo-Eyakan Mbukpo Eyo Akan
- Community
- Country: Nigeria
- State: Akwa Ibom
- Local Government Area: Urue-Offong/Oruko

Mbukpo-Eyakan is an Oron community in Urue-Offong/Oruko local government area of Akwa Ibom state in Nigeria.
