= Oduonim Isong Inyang =

Oduonim Isong Inyang Oduonim
- Village
- Country: Nigeria
- State: Akwa Ibom
- Local Government Area: Urue-Offong/Oruko

Oduonim Isong Inyang is an Oron Village in Urue-Offong/Oruko local government area of Akwa Ibom state in Nigeria.
