= Ikot Ese, Uruan =

Ikot Ese
- Village
- Interactive map of Ikot Ese
- Country: Nigeria
- State: Akwa Ibom
- Local Government Area: Uruan

Ikot Ese is a village in Uruan local government area of Akwa Ibom state in Nigeria.
