= Usung =

Usung Usung Oro
- Community
- Country: Nigeria
- State: Akwa Ibom
- Local Government Area: Udung Uko

Usung is an Oron Community in Udung Uko local government area of Akwa Ibom state in Nigeria.
