= Abiak Elibi =

Abiak Elibi Abiak Elibi
- Village
- Location in Nigeria
- Coordinates: 4°42′59.170″N 8°8′50.935″E
- Country: Nigeria
- State: Akwa Ibom
- Local Government Area: Urue-Offong/Oruko

Abiak Elibi is an Oron Village in Urue-Offong/Oruko local government area of Akwa Ibom state in Nigeria.

Oron folklore tells of Abiak Elibi (Run and Hide) village was created as an escape spot in Akpakip Oro for people to hid when they feel like they are under attack.
