= Uko Ukwong =

Uko Ukwong Uko Ukwong
- Town
- Country: Nigeria
- State: Akwa Ibom
- Local Government Area: Oron, Akwa Ibom

Uko Ukwong is an Oron Town in Oron local government area of Akwa Ibom state in Nigeria.
