= Eyo-Uya =

Eyo Uya Uya
- Town
- Location in Nigeria
- Country: Nigeria
- State: Akwa Ibom
- Local Government Area: Oron, Akwa Ibom

Eyo Uya is a town in the Oron metropolitan area of Akwa Ibom, Nigeria.
