= Radio Nigeria Kaduna =

Radio station in Nigeria

Federal Radio Corporation of Nigeria Kaduna, formerly known as Radio Kaduna, was founded in 1962. It now has the largest radio listenership in sub-Saharan Africa.

The station broadcasts in Hausa, English, Nupe, and Kanuri. The Hausa programme can be heard in Kaduna state and worldwide on 6090 kHz shortwave, and the English programme on 4770 kHz. Its FM channels are Supreme FM on 96.1 MHz and Karama FM on 92.1 MHz.

== See also ==
- Radio Télévision Libre des Mille Collines - a similar radio station that played a role in the Rwandan genocide
