= Uya Oro =

Uya Oro Uya Oro
- Community
- Location in Nigeria
- Country: Nigeria
- State: Akwa Ibom
- Local Government Area: Oron, Akwa Ibom

Uya Oro is an Oron Community and Town also the capital of Oron local government area of Akwa Ibom state in Nigeria.
