= Eyulor =

Eyulor Eyo-Ulor Oro
- Community
- Location in Nigeria
- Country: Nigeria
- State: Akwa Ibom
- Local Government Area: Urue-Offong/Oruko

Eyulor is an Oron Community in Urue-Offong/Oruko local government area of Akwa Ibom state in Nigeria.

Eyo-Ulor as it is popularly called by the Oron people was formed by Ullor of one of the son of Ekete Okpo who found primacy at Okpe Oruko after the spread the Ubodung clan.
