= Uya (surname) =

Uya or Uyá is the surname of the following notable people:

- Miguel Ángel Sastre Uyá, 21st century Spanish politician
- Okon Uya (1947–2014), Nigerian diplomat
