= Eyotong =

Eyotong Eye Otong
- Community
- Location in Nigeria
- Country: Nigeria
- State: Akwa Ibom
- Local Government Area: Oron, Akwa Ibom

Eyotong is an Oron Community in Oron local government area of Akwa Ibom state in Nigeria.
