= Uboro Oro =

Uboro Oro Uboro
- Community
- Location in Nigeria
- Country: Nigeria
- State: Akwa Ibom
- Local Government Area: Urue-Offong/Oruko

Uboro Oro is an Oron community in Urue-Offong/Oruko local government area of Akwa Ibom state in Nigeria.
