= Okuku Township =

Okuku Town Okuku
- Town
- Country: Nigeria
- State: Akwa Ibom
- Local Government Area: Urue-Offong/Oruko
- Time zone: UTC+1 (West Africa Time)

Okuku Town is an Oron town in Urue-Offong/Oruko local government area of Akwa Ibom state in Nigeria.
