= Ibrahim Coomassie =

Nigerian police officer (1942–2018)

9th Inspector General of Police
- In office 1993 – 29 May 1999
- Preceded by: Aliyu Attah
- Succeeded by: Musiliu Smith

Personal details
- Born: 18 March 1942 Katsina, Colonial Nigeria
- Died: 19 July 2018 (aged 76)
- Relations: Abidina Coomassie (brother)
- Occupation: Police officer

Ibrahim Coomassie (18 March 1942 – 19 July 2018) was a Nigerian police officer and the 9th Inspector General of Nigerian Police serving between 1993 and 1999, under the military governments of Generals Sani Abacha and Abdulsalami Abubakar. He died on Thursday 19 July 2018 after a protracted illness. He was 76 years old.

== Background ==
Ibrahim Coomassie was among the eldest sons of Malam Ahmadu Coomassie, an educationist and businessman who became a permanent secretary of the ministry of education in the Northern region. Ibrahim Coomassie was born in Katsina State on 18 March 1942. He was educated at the Provincial Secondary School, Zaria, Barewa College, Zaria, the Detective Training College, Wakefield, UK and Washington DC in the United States.

== Inspector General of Police ==
In 1993, Ibrahim Coomassie was appointed Inspector General of the Nigerian police, succeeding Aliyu Attah. In June 1994, president-elect M.K.O. Abiola was arrested without warrant and detained by the police. He was mistreated in prison, where he was held for four years before dying in June 1998. Although head of police, Coomassie evaded responsibility for the detention.

In 1996, Coomassie launched an investigation into police actions during the military rule of General Ibrahim Babangida (1985–1993). In July 1997, Coomassie said he wanted to question the American Ambassador and members of the US Embassy staff about a series of bombings of military targets. The government had accused the National Democratic Coalition of responsibility and said publicly that they suspected American diplomats knew about the bombings in advance.

In March 1998, Ibrahim Coomassie said that the press was misinterpreting a speech that head of state General Sani Abacha had made in November 1997. He said General Abacha had promised to grant amnesty to some prisoners, but not to release political detainees. At a police graduation ceremony in July 1998, Coomassie warned the new officers against corrupt practices, and said he had ordered the removal of all police roadblocks. However, the police roadblocks continued. In 1998, Coomassie observed that any time a citizen became a public figure, his first act was to ask for an orderly and policemen to guard his house, as a status symbol.

Sani Abacha died in June 1998, apparently of a heart attack. A federal government delegation led by Ibrahim Coomassie paid a formal condolence visit to Mrs. Abacha. During the visit, she accused a prominent member of the delegation of being responsible for Abacha's death, and asked Coomassie to arrest him.

In January 1999, Coomassie was part of a delegation that flew to Libya, despite a UN ban on air travel to that country, and held talks with the Libyan Foreign Affairs Minister. Ibrahim Coomassie retired from service and left with the Government of General Abdulsalami Abubakar in May 1999.

== Later career ==
In October 1999, government investigations into abuses by the Abacha regime, including the assassination of Kudirat Abiola (wife of M.K.O. Abiola) in 1996 and the suspected murder of Shehu Musa Yar'Adua in detention in December 1997, resulted in the arrest of Ibrahim Coomassie and other leading figures, including Mohammed Abacha, the dictator's son. Coomassie was placed under house arrest. Coomassie was reportedly scheduled to appear before the police's Special Investigation Panel. However, later that month, Information Minister Dapo Sarumi denied reports that Coomassie was under arrest.

In August 2004, the Emir of Katsina appointed him to a committee to the development and growth of Jamaatul Nasir Islam's activities in the state. He became a member of the board of trustees of the Arewa Consultative Forum for Katsina State. The forum's mission is to protect the interest of Northern Nigeria and promote healthy co-existence that will sustain the environmental quality, livability, and economic vibrancy of the region. In September 2008 he suffered serious injuries in a car accident, and spent some time in intensive care. In August 2009, he donated about a million Naira worth of laboratory science equipment to the Police Boys secondary school, Mani, in Katsina State. He died on 19 July 2018.
