= Afaha Okpo Town =

Afaha Okpo Town Afaha Okpo
- Town
- Location in Nigeria
- Coordinates: 4°54′10″N 7°54′36″E
- Country: Nigeria
- State: Akwa Ibom
- Local Government Area: Urue-Offong/Oruko

Afaha Okpo Town is an Oron town and in Urue-Offong/Oruko local government area of Akwa Ibom state in Nigeria.
