= Ikot Ese, Etinan =

Ikot Ese
- Village
- Interactive map of Ikot Ese
- Country: Nigeria
- State: Akwa Ibom
- Local Government Area: Etinan

Ikot Ese is a village in Etinan local government area of Akwa Ibom State.
