= Okobo people =

Okobo people are native to the Okobo local government area in Akwa Ibom State of Nigeria. They are subdivided into three major clans: Odu, Eta and Atabong.
