= Ibiaku Uruan =

Ibiaku-Uruan
- Village
- Country: Nigeria
- State: Akwa Ibom
- Local Government Area: Uruan

Ibiaku Uruan is a village in Uruan local government area of Akwa Ibom state in Nigeria.
