= Umume =

Umeme Umeme Oro
- Village
- Country: Nigeria
- State: Akwa Ibom
- Local Government Area: Urue-Offong/Oruko

Urue Offong Town is an Oron village in Urue-Offong/Oruko local government area of Akwa Ibom state in Nigeria.
