= Uko Akpan =

Uko Akpan Uko Akpan
- Town
- Location in Nigeria
- Country: Nigeria
- State: Akwa Ibom
- Local Government Area: Mbo, Akwa Ibom

Uko Akpan is an Oron Town in Mbo local government area of Akwa Ibom state in Nigeria.
