= Uba, Ubotong =

Uba, Ubotong Uba Oro
- Community
- Country: Nigeria
- State: Akwa Ibom
- Local Government Area: Mbo, Akwa Ibom

Uba is an Oron Community located in Mbo local government area of Akwa Ibom state in Nigeria.
