= Maritime Academy of Nigeria =

Federal institution in Nigeria

- Former names: Nautical College of Nigeria
- Type: Federally owned educational institute
- Established: 1979
- Location: No. 4, College Road, P.M.B 1089, Oron, Akwa Ibom, Nigeria; 4°49′33″N 8°14′2″E
- Website: https://maritimeacademy.gov.ng

The Maritime Academy of Nigeria Oron, Akwa Ibom State was formerly known and address as the Nautical College of Nigeria was established in 1977 by the Federal Executive Conclusion No. EC(77) 172 with assistance from the International Maritime Organisation (IMO). It was established as a training institution under the Research and Statistic Department of the Federal Ministry of Transport. It was declared open for classes on 6 October 1979. The academy was originally designed as an integrated institution for the education and training of shipboard officers and ratings and shore-based management personnel.

At inception, the Nautical College was made up of three Academic Department, namely, the Nautical Science, Marine Engineering and General Studies. Following the ratification of the STCW 1978 Convention by Nigeria in 1986, the status of the Nautical College of Nigeria was upgraded by Decree No 16 of 1988 (now Cap M3 LFN 20), its responsibilities enlarged and its name changed to Maritime Academy of Nigeria .

== History ==
The Maritime Academy of Nigeria, formerly known and address as the Nautical College of Nigeria was established in 1977 by the Federal Executive Conclusion No. EC(77) 172 with assistance from the International Maritime Organisation (IMO). It was established as a training institution under the Research and Statistic Department of the Federal Ministry of Transport. It was declared open for classes on 6 October 1979. The academy was originally designed as an integrated institution for the education and training of shipboard officers and ratings and shore-based management personnel.

At inception, the Nautical College was made up of three Academic Department, namely, the Nautical Science, Marine Engineering and General Studies. Following the ratification of the STCW 1978 Convention by Nigeria in 1986, the status of the Nautical College of Nigeria was upgraded by Decree No 16 of 1988 (now Cap M3 LFN 20), its responsibilities enlarged and its name changed to Maritime Academy of Nigeria .The management team of the maritime academy as of May 2020 included:

- Commodore Duja Emmanuel Effedua (Rtd) – Rector
- Mr. Netson Peter M. – Ag. Registrar
- Dr. Kevin O. Okonna – Director, Specialized Seafarers Training Courses
- Engr. Ekwere Ekwere Williams – Ag. Director, School of Marine Engineering
- Capt.Abdulganiyu Odogba Alimi – Ag. Director, School Of Nautical Studies
- Mr. Gabriel M. Eto – Ag. Director, School Of Maritime Transport Studies
- Mr. Omotoso Olaoluwa Olusegun.– Ag. Director, Strategy, Research & Development
- Dr. John A. Adeyanyu – Coordinator Academic Affairs
- Ambi Anthony Anto – Ag. Bursar
- Engr. Olukayode Olusegun Olaleye – Ag. Director, Work and Services

== Facilities ==
The academy occupies a large area of land on the waterfront in Oron, close to the Cross River approaches of the Port of Calabar in Cross River State and about 200 kilometres from Port Harcourt, Rivers State. In April 2003, President Olusegun Obasanjo directed that work should start on construction of a jetty for the academy.

In February 2010 Nigeria Liquefied Natural Gas (NLNG) said it had donated N30 million of safety training equipment to the academy. The equipment included a totally enclosed 50-person lifeboat, a davit-launched rescue boat and a twelve-person life-raft. NLNG had previously donated equipment worth over N100 million, and uses Nigerians from the academy for 60% of its crews. However, graduates of the Maritime Academy do not have access to oceangoing vessels for them to earn hours at sea, which is required for their professional qualification.

== Library ==
Upon the university's founding in April 2018, the University Library employed two staff members initially and has since hired three more. Accessible to both staff and students, the University Library is strategically placed near the administration building. The first level of the building is devoted to circulation services, reference and serials, an e-library, and information service units. The structure is intended to store information resources. The open collection and reading areas are located on the upper floor. the library has database with open access journals to meet the information need of the community at large.

== Demand and capacity ==
The Nigerian Maritime Administration and Safety Agency (NIMASA) has said that 50,000 seafarers are needed for the Nigerian shipping industry to realise its full potential. As of 2009, Nigeria had fewer than 3,000 seafarers. About 2,000 vessels were engaged in cabotage, or local trade between Nigerian ports, with mostly foreign crews. Announcing plans to open a new academy at Badagry, the head of the Nigerian Maritime Administration and Safety Agency said in 2008 that more than 3,000 students apply each year for admission to the Oron-based academy but fewer than 1,000 are accepted. In October 2009 the academy's rector explained that the academy had to restrict the number of students admitted due to shortage of classrooms and accommodations. He denied bias in admission, and said the academy in fact made it easier for candidates from disadvantaged states to gain admission.

== Courses ==
The following courses are offered by the institution:

- Maritime Transport and Business Studies
- Electrical/Electronic Engineering
- Marine Engineering
- Maritime Transport and Business Management
- Nautical Science

== Quality of training ==
In May 2009 the academy was subject to severe criticism by the director of Lagos Channel Management. He said that even the Nigerian Maritime Administration and Safety Agency had found that the academy did not meet international standards. Problems included lack of adequate teaching facilities to handle the number of students, and unavailability of seafaring vessels on which students could complete their mandatory one-year sea term. Students seeking proper training had to attend the Regional Maritime University in Accra, Ghana. Captain Thomas Kemewerighe, a graduate of the academy, said Nigeria does not have people qualified to provide proper training. He said most of the graduates ended up as "okada riders" (motorbike taxi operators).

In September 2009 the government announced that a project launched by the Federal Ministry of Transport, the Nigerian Seafarers Development Programme, would send a first batch of 27 students to the Academy of Maritime Education and Training in India to study for Bachelor in Science and Bachelor in Engineering degrees in marine-related subjects. The academy was not considered for this programme.

In 2020, the Nigerian Senate through the chairman of the Committee on Maritime Transport expressed their worries over the seafaring manpower capacity of Nigeria as maritime administration and education are critical components of economic growth for countries that depend on importation and exportation through the seas.

== Other issues ==
In August 2009 three human rights groups petitioned President Umaru Musa Yar'Adua to investigate alleged cases of corruption and financial malpractices at the academy. They also claimed that 43 students had died in avoidable circumstances in the past year.

== See also ==
- List of polytechnics in Nigeria
