= Eyo Abasi =

Eyo Abasi Eyo Abasi
- Community
- Location in Nigeria
- Country: Nigeria
- State: Akwa Ibom
- Local Government Area: Oron, Akwa Ibom

Eyo Abasi is an Oron Community in Oron local government area of Akwa Ibom state in Nigeria.
