= Ekim =

Ekim Ekim Oro
- Community
- Location in Nigeria
- Country: Nigeria
- State: Akwa Ibom
- Local Government Area: Udung Uko
- Time zone: UTC+1 (West Africa Time)

Ekim is an Oron Community in Udung Uko local government area of Akwa Ibom state in Nigeria.
