= Enwang =

- Town
- Location in Nigeria
- Country: Nigeria
- State: Akwa Ibom
- Local Government Area: Mbo, Akwa Ibom
- Time zone: UTC+1 (West Africa Time)

Enwaang is an Oron Town and the Capital of Mbo local government area of Akwa Ibom state in Nigeria.
