= Udung-Uko =

Local Government Area of Akwa Ibom State

Udung-Uko Akai Oro Oron East
- LGA
- Interactive map of Udung-Uko
- Location in Nigeria
- Coordinates: 4°46′0″N 8°14′0″E
- Country: Nigeria
- State: Akwa Ibom State
- Capital: Eyofin

Government
  - Chairman: Hon. Atanang Asuquo Osung

Area
  - Total: 68.76 km^{2} (26.55 sq mi)

Population (2022)
  - Total: 67,700
  - Density: 985/km^{2} (2,550/sq mi)
- Time zone: UTC+1 (WAT)
- Postal Code: 523
- Area codes: 523105, 523106.

Udung-Uko is a local government area in Akwa Ibom State, Nigeria. It was created in December 1996.

Udung Uko is one of the Oro-speaking local government areas of Akwa Ibom State. It is bounded by Mbo, Akwa Ibom to the south, Oron, Akwa Ibom to the north, Urue-Offong/Oruko to the west and the Cross River Estuary to the east.

== History ==
In December 1996, Udung Uko LGA was carved out of Oron, Akwa Ibom. Esuk Usung served as the entry point for the Nigerian Army during the Nigerian Civil war of 1967 to 1970 against Biafra.

== Clans and settlement ==
Udung Uko is made up of two (2) out of the nine (9) Oron people clans (Afaha) with the Oro language as its original language. Udung Uko has 42 organised villages, divided into 10 political wards, with its capital at Eyofin. The two clans include

Afaha Okpo Clan which includes forty (40) towns and villages;

- Enino
- Eyiba
- Eyo Ating Osung
- Eyo Esin
- Eyo Esio Usung
- Eyo Uliong
- Eyo-Ating
- Eyobiosio
- Eyofin
- Eyoko
- Eyokponung
- Eyokpu
- Eyosio-Osung
- Eyotai
- Udung Otok
- Udung Adatang
- Edikor Eyiba
- Edikor Eyobiosio
- Edikor Eyokpu
- Eniongo
- Eye Oko
- Eyo Atai
- Eyo Atang
- Eyo Ating-Osung
- Eyo Ebieme
- Eyo Esio Osung
- Eyo Nsek
- Eyo Okponung
- Eyo Ukpe
- Eyo Uliong
- Eyo Ulung
- Eyo Uwe
- Eyobisung
- Uboro Isong Inyang
- Udung Adatang
- Udung Esio
- Udung Uko Town
- Usung

Afaha Ubodung Clan consist of two Villages which include

- Ekim
- Ubodung Udung Uko

== Geography and Population ==
With a mainly agrarian rural population of 53,060 and a total land area of 112 km^{2} (excluding territorial waters). Udung Uko is in the tropical region and has a uniformly high temperature all year round. The two main seasons are the dry which spans between October and April and wet season which starts around May and ends in September. There are also two prevailing winds – the South-West onshore winds which bring heavy rains and the North- East trade winds blowing across the Sahara Desert, which bring in the dry season.

== Economy ==
Udung Uko LGA has rich deposits of crude oil and salt with the area hosting a number of crude oil mining firms. Fishing is also a crucial economic enterprise in Udung Uko LGA with the area's rivers and streams being rich in seafood. Other important economic activities of the dwellers of Udung Uko LGA include farming, making of canoes and wood carving.

It has a beach market at Esuk Usung, where fishermen from Ilaje, Cameroon, Ghana, and indigenes alike who return from fishing expeditions display their wares for sale, in addition to other water ways and fronts like Esuk Okong, Esuk Edet Edem, and Atakibang from which commercial quantity of fine sand and gravel are extracted. Atakibang, so called, directly faces both the lighthouse (ibang) on the riverbed of Oron river, as well as Parrot island (Uko Ubo Akpa).

== See also ==
- Oron people
- Urue-Offong/Oruko
- Mbo, Akwa Ibom
- Okobo, Akwa Ibom
- Oron, Akwa Ibom
- Obolo, Akwa Ibom
- Akwa Ibom State
- Oron Nation
