= Oron, Nigeria =

Oron Ákánā Ōbió Ōró Oron Central
- City and LGA
- Interactive map of Oron
- Location in Nigeria
- Coordinates: 4°50′0″N 8°14′0″E
- Country: Nigeria
- State: Akwa Ibom State
- Capital: Uya Oro
- Created: 1970

Government
  - Chairman: Hon. Chief Okon Asukwo Enweme

Area
  - Total: 126.5 km^{2} (48.8 sq mi)

Population (2022)
  - Total: 111,300
  - Density: 879.8/km^{2} (2,279/sq mi)
- Time zone: UTC+1 (WAT)
- Postal code: 523
- Area codes: 523121, 523120, 523118, 523101.
- Climate: Am

Oron is a coastal city and Local Government Area (LGA) in Akwa Ibom State, Nigeria. It is home to the Maritime Academy of Nigeria and the Oron Museum.

It has an area of 70 km^{2} and had a population of 156,461 at the 2006 census.

The postal code of the area is 523.

== History ==
Oron became a Division in August 1970 and, in 1976, was made a Local Government Area. Following the federal government's local government creation exercise in 1989, Oron was split into three Local Government Areas: Mbo, Oron, and Okobo. Again, in September 1991, Urue-Offong/Oruko Local Government Area was carved out of Oron Local Government Area. Finally, in December 1996, Udung Uko Local Government Area was further carved out of Oron LGA.

== Clan and settlement ==
Oron Town as it is popularly known is made up of four (4) out of the nine (9) Oron clans (Afaha). These are:

Afaha Okpo Clan also known as Afaha Okpo District includes;

- Esin Ufot
- Esuk Oro
- Eyo Ekung Inyang
- Eyo Obiosio
- Udung Esin
- Udung Ulo
- Udung Usotia
- Udung Ekung
- Ikwita

Ibighi Clan also known as Uya Oro District includes;

- Uya Oro
- Eyo-Atta
- Eyo-Esu
- Eyo-Ifang
- Eyo-Odiong
- Eyo-Okpo
- Eyo-Uya
- Udung Okwong
- Udung Uwe

Afaha Ukwong Clan now known as Eyo Abasi District includes;

- Eyo Abasi
- Akai-Ikon
- Udung Ekung
- Udung Ekung II
- Udung Osin
- Udung Uko
- Uko Ukwong
- Uko Uyokim.

Afaha Ubodung Clan now known as Eyotong District comprises;

- Eyotong
- Eyo-Esang-Obisung
- Eyo-Esio-Uwak
- Eyo-Okpo-Oyo
- Eyo-Orukra-Usuyak
- Eyo-Otong-Uwe
- Eyo-Oyete
- Udung Obisung.

== Geography ==
Oron is in the tropical region and has a uniformly high temperature all year round. The two main seasons are the dry which spans between October and February and wet season which starts around March and ends in September. There are also two prevailing winds – the South-West onshore winds which brings heavy rains and the North- East trade winds blowing across the Sahara Desert, which brings in the dry season.

== Natural resources ==
The region is extremely fertile and is known for its topographical Oil Palm Belt, tropical rainforest, swamps, and beaches. The mangrove forests also provide timber and raw materials for medicinal purposes. There are also deposits of solid minerals such as iron, free silica or glass sand and gravel. Seafoods such as crayfish, snipers, oyster and periwinkle abound richly. Oron is also rich in oil and natural gas. Most of its oil reserves are off-shore with large amounts of untapped natural gas.

== See also ==
- Oron people
- Urue-Offong/Oruko
- Mbo, Akwa Ibom
- Okobo, Akwa Ibom
- Udung Uko
- Obolo, Akwa Ibom
- Akwa Ibom State

== Political Wards ==
Wards	Ward Centers
Oron Urban 1	Park Office, Oron
Oron Urban 2	Primary School, Akwa Edung
Oron Urban 3	A.M.E. Zion School, Oron
Oron Urban 4	Primary School, Ukpata
Oron Urban 5	Methodist Boy’s High School, Oron
Oron Urban 6	Mainland Technical School, Oron
Oron Urban 7	Primary School, Uko Uyukim, Oron
Oron Urban 8	Primary School, Eyo Abasi
Oron Urban 9	Primary School, Iquita 1
Oron Urban 10	Eyotong Lane Junction
Oron Urban 11	Primary School, Uya Oron
