= Uruan =

- LGA
- Nickname: Uruan Inyang Atakpo Efik
- Interactive map of Uruan
- Location in Nigeria
- Coordinates: 5°02′0″N 8°03′0″E
- Country: Nigeria
- State: Akwa Ibom State
- Capital: Idu
- Biggest Village: Ndon Ebom
- Established: 1988

Government
  - Type: Democracy
  - Executive Chairman: Hon, Surv. Iniobong Ekpenyong

Area
  - Land: 449 km^{2} (173 sq mi)

Population (2016)
  - Total: 164,000
  - Density: 365/km^{2} (946/sq mi)
- Time zone: UTC+1 (WAT)

Uruan is a Local Government Area (LGA) in Akwa Ibom State, located in southern Nigeria. It was created in 1988 from Uyo Local Government Area and covers an approximate land mass of 449 km^{2}. According to the 2016 census, the population of Uruan is estimated at 164,000. The administrative headquarters is located in Idu.

Uruan is situated within the rainforest belt of southern Nigeria; which has extensive arable land, abundant wildlife, raffia palms, and timber resources. The fertile coastal plains of the area support the cultivation of various crops, including cassava and maize.

The people of Uruan speak the Uruan language.

== History ==
The Uruan people have maintained strong relationships with their neighbours and have preserved their seven-clan structure over the years. This structure is evident during the coronation and burial ceremonies of the Edidem Atakpor, the Nsomm of Uruan, where seven traditional bowmen, seven spearmen, seven swordsmen, and seven royal staff-bearers are present, each representing Essien Uruan.

The principal deity of the Uruan people is Atakpor, believed to have been brought from Southern Cameroons. Atakpor is regarded as a Great Mother deity associated with water. Historically, she was seen as a female deity and an intermediary through whom the Uruan people communicated with Abasi (God). Today, the Uruan people believe that this Great Mother deity resides in the body of water now known as Akwa Akpa Uruan (The Mighty Sea of Uruan).

Other significant aspects of Uruan heritage include Ekpe, Ekong (War), Nka (Age-grade), Ebre, Fattening Home (Nkugho), and others. The Uruan people established the Ekpe society, which was used to maintain law and order as well as for entertainment. There are different grades of Ekpe, such as Nyamkpe, Nkanda, Mbökkö, and Ibom. Higher-grade members of Ekpe are known for their use of Nsibidi, a system of secret symbols used for communication.

Ekong was a traditional warrior society that encouraged chivalry and bravery among men in Uruan. It served as an instrument for checking social ills and fostering security and unity among the people. Ebre was a traditional society led by women that promoted women's rights and played a role in social and political control. Nka (age-grades) in Uruan were used to ensure the effective performance of community duties, mutual assistance, and discipline among members.

The Uruan people developed the Uruan language, which is derived from the proto-Ibibio language. It is a variant of the Ibibio language and, for historical reasons, has often been referred to as the Efik language. Uruan and Efik are both Iboku groups.

According to Uruan historians such as Dominus Essien of the University of Uyo and Edet Akpan Udo, author of Who Are the Ibibios, the Uruan people are believed to have migrated in different waves from East-Central and Southern Africa to Uruan Akpe, in the area now called Idomi, in the Rio del Rey region near the Southwest Region of Cameroon and the Cross River State border, where they settled for centuries. The first Batanga War, which caused economic and social unrest in the region, led the Uruan people to migrate to the Cross River Basin area known as Akani Obio Uruan around the 8th century AD. The river near their settlement was named Akwa Akpa Uruan, meaning "Mighty River of Uruan."

In the 13th century, another wave of Uruan people, an Iboku group that migrated through a different route, joined their kinsmen at Akani Obio Uruan and Akpa Mfri Ukim. Due to geographical and ecological challenges such as frequent flooding, the Uruan people later migrated further inland, settling in the area now known as Uruan Local Government Area in Akwa Ibom State.

Due to internal conflicts among some clans within Uruan, the Akpe Iboku people of Uruan, now known as the Eburutu tribe and later nicknamed "Efik," migrated from Uruan Country (Essien Uruan Itiaba) to various locations such as Creek Town (Uruan Esit Edik), Duke Town (Uruan Ibuot Utan), and Henshaw Town (Nsidung). Even today, some Efik families cherish their ancestral ties to Uruan villages such as Esuk Odu, Issiet Ekim, Mbiaya, Ibiaku Uruan, Adadia, Ndon Ebom, and Ekpene Ibia, where the Efik language is still spoken.

== Clans ==
Of the original twelve traditional clans of Uruan, only seven largely unrecognised clans remain today. Members of the other clans are believed to have settled among the Ibibio, particularly in villages such as Ekpene Ukim in Nsit Ubium and Ikpa in Eket. To this day, these villages maintain strong ties with their Uruan kindreds.

The remaining seven clans are:

- Akwa Uruan – This clan comprises Nturukpum, Esuk Odu, Ibuno Issiet, Issiet Inua Akpa, Use Uruan, Issiet Ekim, Ekim-Enen, Afaha Ikot, Ikot Nkanga, Ama Odung, Ikot Owot, Esuk Issiet, and Obio Nkan.
- Etongko Mkpe Uruan – This clan includes Ifiayong Obot, Obio Obot Osong, Osong, Akpa Utong, Ibikpe, Ikot Udo, and Mbiaya.
- Mutaka Uruan – This clan consists of Ekpene Ibia, Ikot Edung, Ibiaku Issiet, Obio Ndobo, Ikot Akpa Ekang, Ikot Akan, and Adadia.
- Ekondo Uruan – This clan includes Ibiaku Ikot Ese, Ndon Uruan, Ituk Mbang, Ekpene Ukim, Ndon Ebom, Esuk Inyang, Nung Ikono Ufok, and Nung Ikono Obio.
- Mosongko Uruan – This clan comprises Akpa Mfri Ukim, Esuk Anakpa, Ufak Obio Uruan, Akani Obio Uruan, Obio Akwa Akpa Uruan, Esuk Idu, Ikot Etuong, Ifiayong Esuk, Nwaniba, Mbiakong, Ifiayong Usuk, Eman Ikot Udo, and Idu.
- Ibonda Uruan – This clan includes Edik Ikpa, Eman Ukpa, Anakpa, Nna Enin, Ikot Inyang Esuk, Nung Oku, and Ikot Oto Inyie.
- Akpe Iboku Uruan – This clan comprises Ibiaku, Eman, Utit, Ita, Ikpa, Ikot Oku, and Esuk Ikpa.

== See also ==
- Ibiaku Uruan
- Utit Uruan
- Ikot Akan
- Ikot Otoinye
