= Oron people =

Ethnic group in West Africa

Oron (Örö)
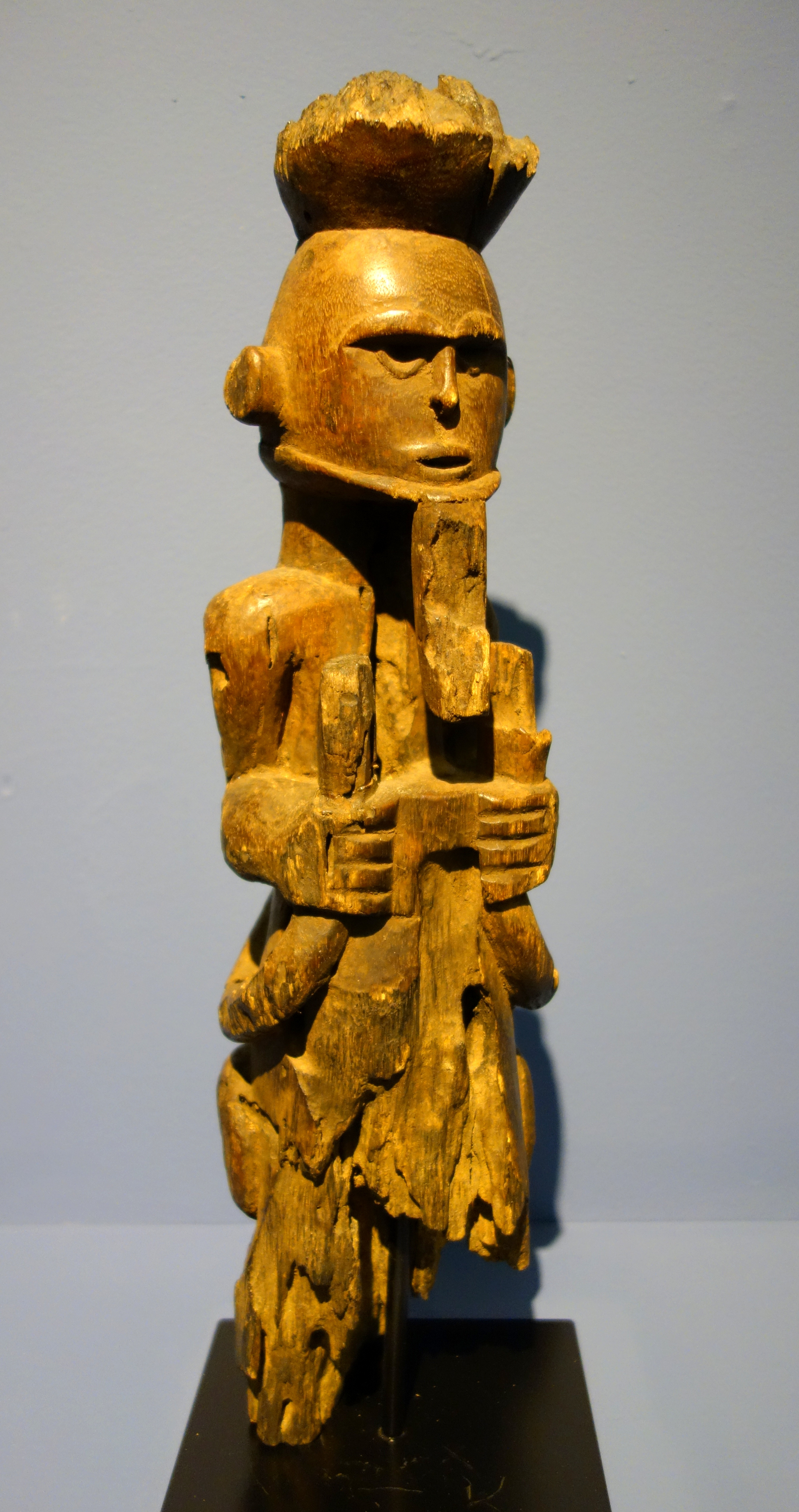
Ãkpákip Ōró Abang Okpo

Total population
- 1.407 million (2015)

Regions with significant populations
- Nigeria: 800,000
- Cameroon: 600,000
- Democratic Republic of the Congo: 7,000

Languages
- Oro, Ibibio, Efik, Ebughu, Ilue, Efai, Okobo, Enwang, Uda English

Religion
- Christianity, Oro Religion

Related ethnic groups
- Ibibio, Efik, Obolo, Ogoni, Ijaw, Ejagham, Mboko, Balondo.

The Oron people (or Örö people) are a multi-ethnic tribal grouping that make up the Akpakip Oro or Oron Nation. The Oron people (Örö) are located primarily in Southern Nigeria, in the riverine area of Akwa Ibom State and Cross River State and in Cameroon. Akpakip Oro are regarded as an ancient warrior people, speaking the Oron (Oro) language which is in the Cross River language family of the Benue–Congo languages. They are ancestrally related to the Efik people of the Cross River State, the Ibeno and Eastern Obolo (ie Adoni East) in Akwa Ibom, the Andoni people in Rivers State, Ohafia in Abia State and the Balondo-ba-Konja in the Congo.

The geopolitical restructuring of states and local government within Nigeria has seen the egalitarian society of the Oron Nation being fragmented politically in the Niger Delta. They have been divided across two separate Nigerian states, the Cross River State and Akwa Ibom state, and then into five local government areas (LGAs) within the Akwa Ibom state, namely Oron LGA (Oron Central), Okobo, Udung Uko, Mbo, and Urue Ofong/Oruko Local Government Areas.

The Oron Nation is usually called by its members as Oro Ukpabang; Akpakip Oro; or Oro Ukpabang Okpo. These names are derived from their ancestral father Abang Okpo. The Akpakip Oro are made up of nine clans known as Afaha.

== History ==
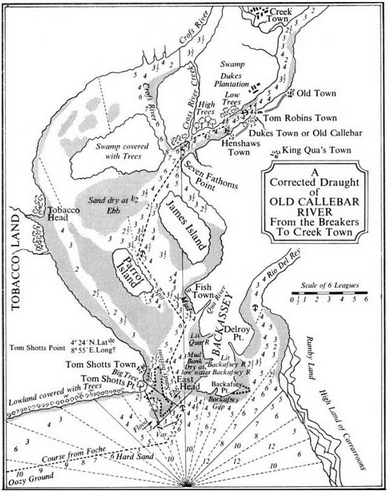
Map of the Cross River estuary c. 1820

Akpakip Oro is a multi-ethnic nation which is made up of six groups:

- Oron Ukpabang
- Okobo
- Idua (Asang)
- Enwang
- Ebughu Otong
- Efiat/Mbo

The earliest known reference to the Oron Nation is from the 24th century BC, around 2370 BC, according to evidence from ancient Oron ancestral carvings, the Ekpu Oro, found today in the Oron Museum and other museums around the world (specifically National Museum of China). Some of the finest wooden statuary attributed to Oron peoples are beautifully carved Ekpu (ancestral figures). Many of these were destroyed and removed from Nigeria during the Biafran war in the late 1960s.

Ekpu Oro ancestral figures existed as summaries of the personal and social experiences of the Oron people of Southeastern Nigeria. They embodied Oron spiritual beliefs and cultural history; hence, they were vessels for the spirits of the dead that instilled great influence over the daily, religious, and social lives of the living. As an art form, Ekpu held the key to understanding Oron past tradition that was largely destroyed by colonial and Christian presence in Oron society.

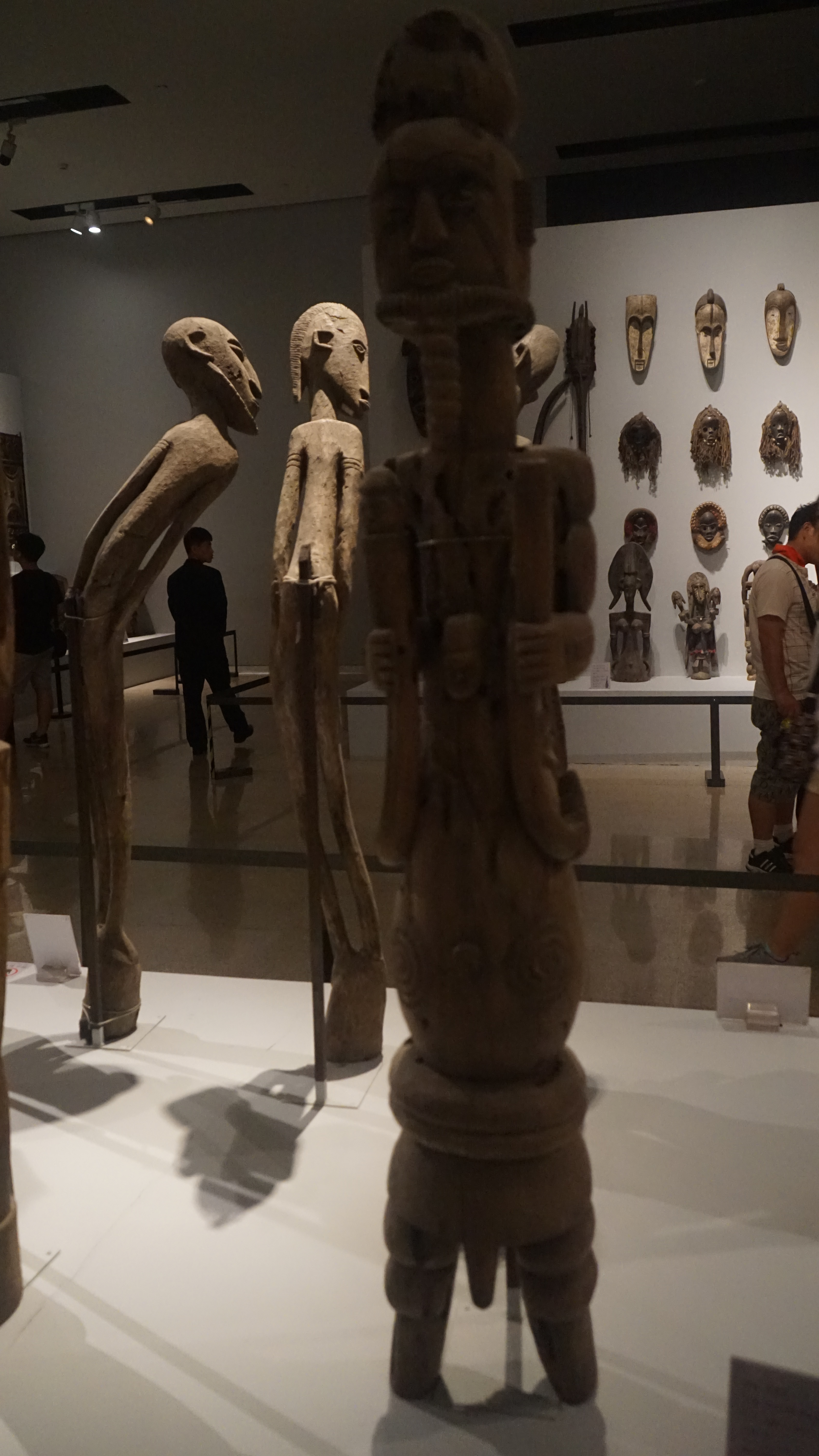
Oron Ancestral figures at the African Museum of China

Natives of this area speak the dialect also known as Oro language. Most Oron people also speak and understand the Efik language fluently. The Oron also has some dialectical similarities with the Ibibio and Annang people, hence their communication in Ibibio and Annang languages is very proficient.

The Oron people were known to the early Europeans as "Tom Shott people", a term used most commonly in a metaphorical sense to describe something that is resilient and stubborn. The Oron people were against the enslavement of Africans and never sold their kinsmen to the Europeans, so the Oron Nation was named Tom Shotts Town, as seen in several ancient maps dating from the 19th century, drawn by Portuguese and Spanish explorers. The Oron dubbed the Europeans 'Mbátáng', meaning Stealers of men, a description summarising the most prominent feature of the Oron's early contact with Europeans: the newcomers enslaving Africans and taking them to unknown destinations. This name is still in use today.

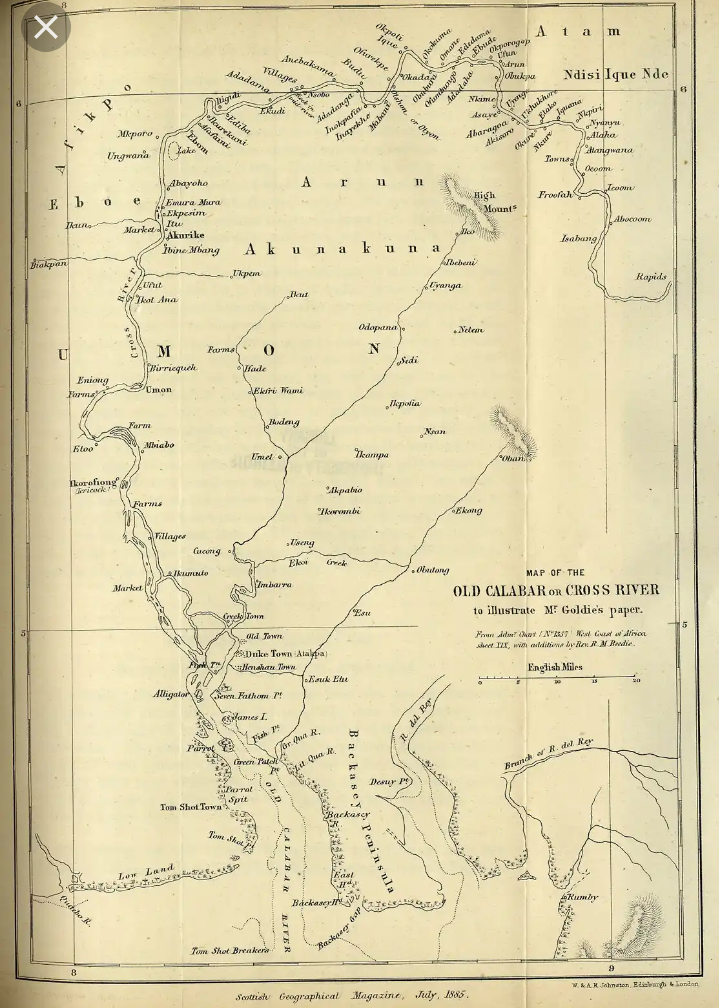
Old Cross River showing Oron as "Tom Shotts Town" - 1885

Neither the Bantu's attire nor any other cultural equivalent anywhere portrays that of Oron language or names. None of Oron Nation culture or names was derived from Bantu or any language elsewhere as immigrant but their clothing was made from loin skirts and gown with beads known as 'Ngwa', their men were clean shaved with an artificial Beard with cap just like the ancient Kemet people, which is seen in several ancient carvings (Ekpu) and as described by Percy Talbot in 1897. Their women plaited hair naturally.

=== Origin and migration ===
The predominant paternal haplogroup among the Oron is E1b1a1-M2. The ancestors of the Oron originally came from Northeast Africa and moved around the Green Sahara. The gradual movement of the Proto Oron to the Cross River Region may have been associated with the expansion of Sahel agriculture in the African Neolithic period, following the desiccation of the Sahara in c. 3500 BCE.

Generally, most historians believe that Otong, the putative ancestor of the Ebughu group, 'Ntekim' the putative ancestor of Idua (Asang) group, 'Okobo' the putative ancestor of the Okobo group who is of Obolo ancestry, and Oron Ukpabang group are from the stock of Abang, the Enwangs are of Iboku ancestry; meanwhile the Efiat group is a mixture of Oron, Efik, Ibibio, and the Cameroons ancestry.

Oron existed in the pre-colonial period of Nigeria and was formerly a part of the province called the South-Eastern state: they were later part of Cross River State and now part of Akwa Ibom State in Nigeria.

Oron people acknowledge the fact that the Ibeno, who dwell among the Ekids, share similar ancestral history with them. While the Oron people recognise the Efik people, Obolo people, Ibeno and Ekid people as part of their ancestral family, many controversies state that the relationship of Oron with Ekid is said to have gone sour when the Eket, under the regime of Brigadier General U.J. Esuene, declared and agreed to be called a subgroup of the Ibibio nation to gain political relevance and advantage. U.J. Esuene was also said to have denied the Oron people the opportunity to site the Exxon Mobile's first terminal in Mbo, Akwa Ibom and Effiat Oron areas of Oron Nation.

Another common controversy that describes the worsened relationship between Oron and Eket is the accusation that General Esuene was the one who ordered the bombing of Urue Oruko (Oruko Market), a region at the heart of Oron where several hundred of Oron people (mostly traders and women) were killed during the Nigerian Civil War in the late 1960s. This unfortunate event has been observed in Oron to be the most tragic in the history of the Nigerian Civil War.

The traditional origin and migration pattern of the six multi-ethnic groups that make up Oron Nation are known from oral histories.

==== Idua (Asang) group ====
Idua (Asang) group is one of the distinct groups that made up Oron Nation. The Idua are a coastal settlement comprising the main four villages of Idua Esit Edik, Idua Asang, Idua Afaha Eduok, and Idua Ukpata. Idua is the first established community in Oron Nation existing around 2370 BC, according to evidence from ancestral carvings.

Oral and most popular historical tradition of the Idua people of Oron trace their migration to their present abode from the Andoni, which is also regarded as the main dispersal for some Oron Ukpabang groups. From tradition, after their arrival from Usangale now in Cameroons, Idua people settled at Anyangala in present-day Andoni which was at that time occupied by several groups. In a subsequent dispute over land which broke out and erupted into open war between the Obodom and Okrika people, the Okrika are said to have hired Nkwo warriors to fight on their behalf: repulsed by the 'eat your victim tactics' used by the Nkwo warriors, the Idua people, under by the leadership of their ancestral father Mbaba, left where they settled to settle among the group known as Idua Eket.

It is generally accepted that it was at Eket that the Idua evolved a separate identity of their own. According to Jefferys:

"From Idua Eket sprang the Idua Oron. At Idua Eket 'Ntekim' rise as an accepted leader. Tradition as it that at Eket the two migrants broke into two group one heading towards Calabar and the other towards Oron where they founded Esuk Akpa and among others. Since then, till now the Eket and the Idua chiefs always come together in meeting to raise issues that is affecting them."

It is said that three things made the Idua move from Eket: apparently, Ntekim and his followers move in order to find a new fishing ground; secondly, the Idua were drawn into conflicts between one man named Okpo of Atebi-Eket, who was accused of witchcraft but decided to find refuge among the Idua. Subsequently, Ntekim left Ikot Use Ekong with some of his children, namely Odiong, Ntekim, Mba, Abia, Essang, Nta, and Uyi and arrived in today's Oron territory at a place called Anaisong, located between Oruko and Mbukpo-Uko-Akai. Further movement took them to Eyo Ekung Inyang with his followers between Udung Uko and the estuary of the Cross River. Here he established a settlement called Ukpa Ita (now known as Ukpata) after three mahogany trees standing together. History has it that Ntekim and his followers didn't find anyone in the land.

Ukpata became the last center of the Idua Oron to their present Villages of Idua Afaha Eduok and Idua Asang. From this centers fishing villages were later established around the Cross River and Atlantic coast, namely Ube Usukpong also known as Ine Nsesiri, Akpando, Esit Akpa Edok, Ine Ekoi, Abana Community and Ine Odiong. The last village to be established was Esit Edik which was to serve as a hideout in times of trouble.

==== Okobo group ====
Okobo group formed another distinct group of the Oron people, bounded in the north and west by Uruan and Nsit clans of Ibibio, on the south by Oron Ukpabang, and on the east by the western channel of the Cross River. Okobo are divided into two clans 'Eta' and 'Odu', the former consisting of Villages of Ebighi Okobo, Ebighi Edu, Ekeya, Ube community, Nda, Akaba community, Esuk Inwang and Atabong, and the latter by Ebighi Eta, Okopedi, Nung Atai Odobo, Amamong, Obufi and Atipa Odobo.

The most credible and popular history of the Okobo people traces Okobo people to Usahadit in Cameroon; apparently the dispersal post-dated that of the Ukpabang people and not the Idua people. Where they sail out from the Usahadit in raft and landed in Ebughu, they were compelled to move out over dispute over land, they sailed up to Uya Oron creek and landed in present-day Odutin. Okobo stay in the location was brief, as they were forced to leave the area by bands of raiders from the warrior tribe of Ukpabang.

It was this later movement that brought them to Ebighi, named after the first son of Okobo, who was a great warrior who led them from Ebughu. From Ebighi, the Okobo began to sprang over their present location: Odu, another son of Okobo, founded Ube, Ekeya, Nda, Obo, and Akaba. Similarly, Eta and his sons founded Ebighi Eta, Okopedi, Odobo, Nung Atai, and Ammamong.

Some other settlements were founded independently, such as Obufi, formed by a group of refugees from the Obolo clan who decided to settle among their Oron kinsmen during their migration. Another was 'Ataobong', founded by 'Antai Ema' a fugitive from Adabio. As the story goes Antai Ema and his family, who specialized in shell fishing, were constantly attacked by crocodile in his vicinity at Adabio. Frightened by this menace, Antai Ema led his people and family to a place where the Okobo called 'Ataw Obong' (place where cane grows plentifully). Yet another non-Okobo group was Esuk Inwang Ekeya between the border of Ekeya and Ndonebom, which was an Efik trading post made up of Efik, Ibibio, and Okobo traders: over time, it became a major settlement.

==== Ebughu Otong group ====
Ebughu Otong group, mainly coastal, north of the Mbo river, bounded in the north and northwest by Udung Uko and Udesi respectively. Meanwhile, Nsie and Oduting were found in the hinterland part of Oron.

The Ebughu group have three competing traditions of origin and migration. The first suggests that Ebughu are part of the Obodom group and the putative ancestor of the Ebughu; Otong migrated from the Andoni in response to the pressure asserted by the southward moving Igbo. The Ebughu reportedly moved southeasterly across the creeks with raft and landed at today Ibuno (Ibeno), but did not find the location suitable for farming. So, Otong and his followers left and brought them to the west bank of the Mbo river. The Ebughu established a relationship of intermarriage and others with the Andoni even till today.

The second migration tradition links the movement of Ebughu to the dispersal of the children of Otong Iboku from Ibom, now in Arochukwu. Ebughu Otong Iboku is said to have left Ibom before the dispersal of the Eburutu from Ibom. Later movement is said to have brought the group to Ntak Inim and later to Idua in the Eket region. Here, war broke out which forced the followers of Otong to migrate further. This later movement brought the Ebughu to their present abode.

The last version of Ebughu origin and migration is that the putative ancestor of the Ebughu, Otong migrated from the Cameroons and first settle at Obutong, near Calabar. Later, they left Calabar and migrated to Akani Obio, where they settled with the Idua people but due to quarrel they left to their present abode. All versions are considered by different segments of the Ebughu people, but acknowledge Otong as their Putative ancestor.

==== Enwang group ====
Enwang group is one of the Oron people groups that inhabit the Mbo littoral called Effiat Mbo. Today, they live principally in the villages of Eyo Ukut, Eyo Efai, Uba, Ubotong, Uko Akpan, Ekiebong, Udombo, Ibete, and Udini, except from Ibuet Ikot and Udung Eyo the other villages are regarded as 'Ata Enwang' (real Enwang).

Enwang tradition and origin is unanimous in linking the Enwang with the Efik of Calabar, with 'Ating Anua' as the father of Enwang. Enwang is regarded as one of the four Eburutu clans that arrived in Uruan from Ibom, which are Abayen, Usuk-Akpa, Enwang, and Iboku. Some historians regard the Enwang as one of the ten children of Iboku, who all settled at Ibom, in today Arochukwu. Then settled in Uruan, before they left to Calabar to avoid being absorbed into the Uruan society as they were known to them as being troublesome: they first lived at Nsidung.

This claim of the prior settlement of Enwang in Calabar before the arrival of the Efiks was the basis of a 1916 court judgement of A. F Webber:

"It is probably, as far as Calabar land is concerned the Efik when they came from Creek Town met the Kwas and the Enwang, the Enwangs an Efik tribe must have come before the other Efiks. This is traditional history as given by the Henshaws, the Enwangs and the Kwas".

Another evidence is the Enwang powerful deity 'Anantigha' which is still located at the Efut beach. And in the past and present Enwang chiefs have to be present in the installation and burial of the Obong of Efikland. Matters came to a head when at Calabar in Nsidung the Enwang masquerade 'Etok Udo Ekang' drove an initiate into the house of an Nsidung woman, knocking down a door which fell on a sleeping baby who was killed instantly. War broke out between Enwang and Nsidung, after an initial victory, the Enwang were defeated and forced to migrate again.

The movement took them to Oron where they landed at present day Esuk Oron, still feeling threatened by possible Efik pursuers, Enwangs left Esuk Oron and moved into the estuary of the Cross River where they settled at 'Mkpang Utong', so called because from there they can listen to news and hear the movement of the Efiks who were still pursuing them. Mkpang Utong proved inhospitable, so they moved along the Mbo river to Ebughu. Apparently the rulers of Ebughu refused to give them land to settle: rather, they directed them to other side of the Mbo river where Uba Mbe, swamp land suitable for settlement existed.

According to tradition, a mud skipper helped the Enwang cross the Mbo river to Uba where a new settlement was established. The advance party sent word to others who were behind to join them, and as days went by the population grew. As mentioned earlier, the tradition of origin and migration is accepted among every Enwang family. It is no little fact that the Enwang are more related in origin to the Efiks than their Oron neighbours, as they agree to their relationship with the Efiks and accept brotherly relationship with the Oron.

==== Oro Ukpabang group ====
The Oro Ukpabang Group are by far the largest group in Oron, and it is in the recognition of this that the area is named after them. The population is concentrated in the hinterland with Udung Uko, Eyo Abasi, Nsie, Oruko, Mbukpo-Eyakan, and Oyubia having large concentrations.

Oro tradition of origin and migration are on four important points. First, contrary to the speculation of the European anthropologists and administrators, the people of Oron categorically reject the notion that they are the sub tribe of the Ibibio. As indicated earlier, this denial is not a recent phenomenon to be explained away by post Nigerian independence political agitation. Indeed, even at the early age of colonial rule, the Ibibio never disputed the fact that the Oron is a distinct ethnic group in Nigeria. On December 4, 1939, in answer to a question put to Mr Udoma Asuquo by Chief Nyong Essien, an Ibibio, the Chief Secretary to the government said:

"They Ukpabang are not of Ibibio Origin, and are not accepted as such by the Ibibios".

Similarly in the Local Government Reform in the Calabar province (1949), Mr R.M Stevens pointed out:

"They Oron are extremely unwilling to be dragged into the predominantly Ibibio unit, in which they feared they will be swamped".

This of course, is not to deny that the two groups have interacted over the years and, in the process, influenced each other.

Secondly, Oron tradition maintains that Abang Okpo, the putative father of the Oron, and his followers came from Ancient Kemet before the advent of the Moslems and Arabs in that region, according to evidence from ancient Oron ancestral carvings Ekpu Oro.

In support of the Mediterranean origin of the Oron people, references are made to certain ancient customs and traditions among the Oron people which is of the same to their Mediterranean counterparts which include: the existence of such semitic names in Oron such as Samu, Sama, Abia, Bieto, Zedeke and Nehema etc; the widespread and fundamental practice of circumcision which was not practice in the ancient times by their neighbours; as well as funeral rites for deceased old people in Oron Traditional society.

None of Oron culture or names were derived from Bantu or any language elsewhere as immigrant and their clothing was made from loins gown and skirts with beads known as 'Ngwa', their men were clean shaved with an artificial Beard with cap just like the ancient Kemet people which is seen in several ancient cravings known as (Ekpu) and as describe by Percy Amaury Talbot in 1897. Their women plaited hair naturally.

Oron folklore tells of Abang Okpo, who was a powerful warrior and the Chief wrestler of the art-form known as `Mbok' whose father was Okpo the son of Nyuserre Ini. The wrestling known as Mbok has been part and parcel of the Oron people, and the date of its origin is unknown. It is said that Abang Okpo and his followers made it popular in the Mediterranean. This is perhaps why it may be more than a mere coincidence that the only two nations on earth with places named "Oron" are Israel and Nigeria. Today, there are Oron, Vaud municipality of Switzerland established 2012 and Oron, Moselle in France.

The Orons are peculiar people, strong contenders in nature wherever they are found, with the accolade `Oron Ukpabang`. Oron people's complexion does not reflect other ethnic nationalities or immigrants in other settlements of the Oron Nation, apart from the Obolo people. Their complexion is not as fair as the Palestinians or Israelis Arab, nor are they as dark as the people of the Cameroon mountain from whence the Oron Nation came into being.

Abang Okpo was said to have wandered with his children and followers through the Sudanic belt, possibly into present-day Uganda, Zaire Congo Basin as a result of the war of the Pygmies (a dwarfish people of Equatorial Africa) which had scattered most of the Africans – known to Oro people as:

“Ini ekung amamisim-isim aka asuan ofid oduobot" (meaning "During the war of the dwarfed tailed people, the war scattered the whole earth").

Then, they settled within the region now known as Jigawa State in Nigeria, which is written and pronounced as `Oronny` inline with Oros` phonemes migration. As he was not comfortable with Islam, he made a major stop in the Cameroons Usahadit and Bakassi precisely called Isangele (Usakedet). That is why there is a prevalence of Oron names as Akan, Ekang, Abang, Etong, Osung, and Etang in the Cameroons today. Among the Oronians, there is a popular saying that the farthest point in the world is Usahadit, which is always siad by older people to the younger ones when they return late from an errand or message:

"Áká-áká Usahádít" (Did you go to Usahadit?)

which is also known to the Oron as Afaha Edit, which is in Cameroon.

Abang begot Do, who begat Donni, who in turn beget Oron and Obolo and their children with others in Usahadit. This tradition emphasizes the now and former accepted relationship between the Oron and Obolo people. Oro, called Adon by the Obolo, who is said to have led the people out of Cameroon, which have been celebrated between them in the past and present till the 1940s. And the Obolo were called Obodung by the Oron.

According to Obolo traditions "Obolo the father of the 'Andonis' and Oron the father of 'Oron Ukpabang' was from the same stock."

They both proudly point to similarities between the Oron culture and that of Obolo in 1948. Including the facts that the two groups never sold their sons into slavery, and that the 'Ekpu' carvings of Oron had the 'Isi-Ebikan' ancestor face of the Obolo as their direct equivalent.

Abang, his followers, and their descendants did not know that other people were already established on that land, and due to dispute over farmland and fishing space, the group later returned to their original homeland of Oron Nation without Abang, who died in Usahadit.

Oron phonemes of migration maintain that there were two waves of migration between the main group of the Oron Ukpabang group, which is known as 'Esu Oro group' (Okwong, Ibighi and Okiuso clans), and the 'Ubuoho Ekung group' (Ubodung and Okpo clans). As observed by E.B Udo in 1975:

"The Oron did not arrive at same time, they earlier arrival was the Ibighi clan, Ukwong clan, Ikiuso clan generally known as 'Esu Oron' Idua and Effiat clan arrived at same time, the Ebughu, Ubodung and Okpo came later."

Firstly, was the first group Esu Oro, who left Usahadit early with the Obolos to establish Ngo (Gogo) after making a stop at today Bakassi, accompanied with frequent war with Bonny and Ogoni people. The Esu Oron group left eastward to today Esuk Oro, near the present site of Methodist Boys High School, Oron. The Original settlements were later disrupted by Portuguese raid on what was the biggest market in the vicinity. The Esu Oro were compelled to scatter, but not before each other had taken a juju vowing to come to the aid of each other in time of troubles. They then moved further inland, with some regrouping at 'Uya Oro', others at 'Oti Oro', and still others at 'Eweme'. The group at Ibetong-Eweme built the first shed, known as Obio Ufre (meaning "an unforgettable spot"). At that same spot, it was therefore agreed that:

“Ku Oro m’eka ufreh nye-eke Ku ini ifuo ma onung ulid” (Oro clans will rise in alliance to defend their own when attacked by non Oro groups). This is the origin of the coinage *OBIO UFRE – "Idika ufreh oyo-eke (Never you forget your kinsmen)"

Subsequently, migration from there led to the establishment of villages in Ukwong, Ibighi, and Okiuso clans: namely the Akataki, or Mbokpu, Okere Oti, Etieke, Uda, and Ubafia group of villages in Okwong clans; the Okpokuk and Utighe groups in Ibighi; and the Abang Alak and Obesidi group of villages in Okiuso.

Each village in the clan was established by children of the clan father. For example, the villages in Ibighi, namely Uya Oron, Okuku Township, Oyuku Ibighi, Atiabang, Oyubia, Urue Ita, Oyoku Assang, and Afaha Akai were founded by the first, second, third, fourth, fifth, sixth, seventh, and eighth sons of Ibighi.

In the second wave of migration, the Obuoho groups arrived the Esuk Oron, after crossing the Cross River in company of the Obolo with the war god Ubuoho. They founded the area as being occupied, while the Obolo group moved on after cutting off and taking away one of the hand of Ubuoho. The others were left behind and lived with the Esu groups. The attacks by the Portuguese slave raiders had already scattered them. Families and relations moved off in search of farmlands and security. The fleeing Ubodung assembled together at 'Eyotong' to establish their principal shrine 'Olughu Obuoho'. Land disputes between them and the Esu group later forced them to move inland. The major gathering point was at 'Urue Okwong', then 'Oru Oro' (Oron present day Obot Eyo). Here, permanent settlement was established, and it was at this point the children of Ubodung spread to found new villages. 'Eyulor', for example, was founded by sons of 'Ekete Okpo' by name 'Ulor' who enjoy primacy at the place 'Okpe Oruko'. 'Anai Okpo' was founded by 'Okpo', 'Udung Okpor' by 'Ukpor', 'Udung Uwe' by 'Uwe', and so on. Other villages founded by same time include 'Ekim', 'Okossi' and 'Ukuda'.

Tradition agrees that the Okpo group and the Ubudung arrived at the same time. The relationship of Okpo, the father of the clan, is that:

"He was born of an Eket mother and he spent much of his early age at Eket, which earn him the name 'Okpo Eket' as children were also named after their mother in a polygamous setting."

He first established a settlement at Uboro Oron, which was developed into village status by his grandson 'Sekung'. According to tradition, Okpo begot 'Bieto' who got other sons, principally 'Sekung', 'Bassey', 'Okpu', and 'Sunlip'. Bassey, Okpu, and Sunlip later moved out of Uboro Oron as the family grew bigger to establish Udung Uko, Edikor, Eyo Bassey, and Uboro Isong Inyang, respectively.

==== Efiat/Mbo group ====
The Effiat/Mbo group, apart from the Enwang in the Effiat Mbo area, are the Effiat. The Effiat area became a meeting point for making and selling sea salts, with different people coming from Cameroon, Calabar, Oron, and Eket. Among those from Calabar are the Effiat group who founded the Efik colony at Obio Okon Ekpo (James Town Mbo), the Uda groups represent the intrusion of Oron settlers, with other groups from Cameroon.

The Effiat is clearly a multi-ethnic group, related principally to the Ibeno, Oron, Eket, and Efik. The Effiat villages in Oron comprise Akwa Obio Effiat, Usuk Effiat, Inua Abasi, Esuk Anwang, and Abana community, which grew from the area listed above.

According to Efik traditions:

"In the sixteenth century a group of fishermen followed 'Ikpoto Otong Iboku', who had left Ibom and sail down the cross river before the departure of the main Efik stock from Ibom to Uruan. Ikpoto Otong subsequent miscegenation with other settling fishermen after obtaining land from the Ibaka people at the beach in other to trade palm oil too.

The Mbo villages of Ibaka Town, Uda community, Offi, Onukim, Udung Eyo Unyenge, and Utit Atai Unyenge belong to the Ukwong Clan of the Oron people. They separated from the main group at Usahadit and crossed to the present site of Uda, with the Ibaka moving out first to establish the present location. Other Villages were established in the same fashion but still held to this common ancestry.

== Language (Nsíŋ Oro) ==
The Oron people speak the popular Oro language, known as "Örö" by the Oronians, but widely called "Oron", an anglicized spelling and pronunciation. Many Oron people are also fluent in the Efik dialect. Örö has many dialectical similarities with the Ibibio and Annang people, hence many Oronians can communicate proficiently in Ibibio and Annang languages.

Other languages spoken by the Oron people include the Ebughu language, Ilue language, Efai language, Okobo language, Enwang language and Uda language.

Oron Numbers from zero to ten
No.	English	Oro language
0	Zero	Îkpíbkpu
1	One	Kí
2	Two	Îbá
3	Three	Îté
4	Four	Îníáŋ
5	Five	Ēdíŋ
6	Six	Ēdíŋ-okí
7	Seven	Ēdíŋ-âbá
8	Eight	Ēdíŋ-áte
9	Nine	Ēdíŋ-áníâŋ
10	Ten	lughu

== Culture and tradition ==
The Oron people have a unique culture and tradition. Oron Nation has a rich culture expressed in songs, folklore and dances. The first National Museum east of the Niger is in Oron known as the Oron Museum, which contains several carvings and artifacts of the Oron People dated back to 2370 BC.

=== Naming structure ===
Another interesting aspect of Oron culture which is quite different from some other cultures outside Akwa Ibom (and probably Eastern Nigeria) is the way that children are named. A child is given his/her own name as a first name (e.g. Okon, Etim, Joe, Affiong etc.), then the father's first name is the child's middle name, and the family name is the child's surname. So, if someone is named John Okung Enyenihi, it is easy to figure out that his name is John, son of Okung, from the Enyenihi family.

=== Oron cuisine ===
Cuisine is another important aspect of Oron culture. The Oron people have a large variety of tasty dishes, most of which are shared with other ethnic groups in Akwa Ibom State, Cross River State and Southern part of Cameroon. These include delicacies like Afang, Edikang Ikong, Ekpang Nkukwo (called Ötotö in Oro) and some lesser-known (but still very delicious) dishes like Atama soup and the Oro traditional soup called Otong that is unique to Oro and is regarded as the traditional dish of Oron people. Otong is very nutritious and is eaten with Iwe Ekpang or Ekpang, which is made of cassava (wrapped in plantain leaves and boiled).

=== Oron traditional dress ===
The ancient Oron people dressing was mainly loin skirts and gowns called (úsé). They later wore local fabrics and beads known as Ngwa. Their men were clean shaved with an artificial Beard with cap just like the ancient Kemet people, which is seen in several ancient carvings, known as Ekpu, and as described by Percy Talbot. Their women plaited hair naturally.

Today, The Oron people (male) have a very colourful mode of traditional dressing with a piece of fabric called the Iyara (usually red in colour) worn in any occasion and weddings. The red Iyara is usually worn with a white tailored traditional shirt and wrap-around (wrapper) fabric common to people all over the South-Southern regions Nigeria. Sometimes this attire is combined with a rich native tie, usually a colourful silk fabric worn around the neck. These attires are also commonly worn by the Efik, Ibibios and Annang ethnic groups, except that the Annang and Ibibio people do not wear a red Iyara because of political implications, except the people of the Balondo Civilization in Congo.

There are different types of traditional Oron female attire. Some garments are used for events like weddings or to perform ancient dances. Each detail in such an attire is carefully thought over and has its special meaning. For instance, those who perform a traditional Abang Dance, the dance of beauty and femininity, wear special headpieces called Ibûd Abang. Such dancers usually have multiple strings of beads around their necks called Nkwaogid Ûtong. They are colorful and bright and meant for additional decoration. Other strings of beads that are worn across their shoulders are called Anana Ubok, and all those colorful raffias that are worn on dancers’ hands are known as Nkpakhá Ubok. The raffias that are worn on legs together with bells have the name of Nkpakhá Etim. In addition to all this, the dancers wear a kind of skirt made out of cane called Akasi. Such details are meant to attract additional attention to the waistline of the dancer. In accordance with the traditional Oron visions of female beauty, a healthy attractive woman should have a full waistline.

The Traditional wedding attire for an Oron bride looks exactly like an Efik bride and cannot be differentiated, the garment that a young woman, especially a bride, wears is meant to show what a desirable wife she is. It is necessary to remember the Oron beauty standards. All this determines the way a wedding attire will look. There are two main types of Oron native wedding attire.

- Ofod Ukod Anwang: consists of two pieces, roughly speaking. The bigger one is a kind of skirt that falls down from the waist and covers the bride's legs to the knees. The smaller one is a top that barely covers the bust. All this is meant to show how full the bride's waist is and how healthy, feminine, and desirable she is for any man. Of course, Oron women needn’t necessarily be as plump as their ancestors would love to see them. Still, the tradition of wearing the Ofod Ukod Anwang is still alive: it allows modern brides to show how graceful their bodies are in any size. All this is accompanied by plenty of accessories, like strings of beads, elaborate head decorations, and so on.
- Onyonyo: the second type of the Oron native wear used for weddings. It is a long, flowing dress that looks like a gown and makes its wearer look like a true queen. In most cases, this gown is decorated with coral beads. Heavy strings of other coral beads will surely be placed around the bride's neck. These attires are accompanied by beaded shoes, lovely accessories, and specific hairstyles that look like real crowns on their heads. The onyonyo is a long gown. It has been suggested that the onyonyo’s resemblance of Victorian gowns is as a result of the influence of the Scottish missionary Mary Slessor.

=== Traditional marriage ===
In Ancient Oron Nation Marriage between a brother and a sister is forbidden even till date. It is the Oron custom where the groom with his kinsmen visit the house of the bride, which must be from another family with the village, community, clan or Oron Nation, to meet the parents and announce his intention. The betrothing process is long and ceremonious. There is a long waiting period, which is the period for the bride-to-be to attain puberty. This practice of child marriage has been abolished. In case both the bride and groom are of the same age, the waiting period is brief.

Nkugho, or the "fattening room," is an ancient marriage practice in Oron Nation. It is the practice where girls are prepared for womanhood. Girls are taken to the room during puberty and acceptance in the room is a demonstration of virtue, sexual purity, and proven virginity. While in Nkugho, girls have to live without their families and are trained by older women of the community. They are given heavy meals to make them gain weight, as in ancient times being fat was a sign of prosperity, fertility, and beauty. In Ancient Oron Society old 'Fattening Room' tradition is the first thing that comes to mind. Six months before marriage, Oron girls are sent to the fattening room that they may be pampered with massages from head to toe, fed as much as they would like to eat, and enlightened on the ins and outs of marriage. They would not be allowed to work: instead, they are to eat sumptuous dishes, engage in meaningful conversation, and sleep, coupled with the three times daily massages that are meant to bring out the natural endowments. Because the ancient Oron people belief that a woman who is full-figured with a healthy waistline is beautiful.

In addition to the above Fattening Room activities, the girl goes through domestic training of home management (like cooking, childcare, and housekeeping) and how to respect and make her husband and his family happy. It is the duty of the older women to give advice about their experience in marriage to ensure a successful one. Also included in the training are the cultural dances, folklore, folktales, songs, and other forms of entertainment. Skills in artistic designs on Calabash and other materials are taught as well. It is here that she is also taught about sex with the intention of giving proper satisfaction to her husband.

At the end of the six months period, which also brings an end of the seclusion days, people all over are invited to honor her success in passing through this ordeal. This ceremony is celebrated with traditional dances and other forms of entertainment. The ceremony continues throughout the whole day and night as families, friends and well-wishers express their joy and happiness with gifts and donations to the bride. And finally, she and her future husband embrace and dance; welcoming their good wishers that have come to join the celebration. The Nkugho period lasts for one month, after which the girl's family would present her to the groom and his family, well-wishers, and the community at large.

Dowry is a way of validating marriage among people of Oron Nation. The dowry comprises clothes and food items, but no money as of then. It is a token of the parents’ effort in raising a suitable female child. At the time of betrothal, the child in past child marriages could not influence the dowry process because of her age, but a mature bride-to-be can influence the process even in contemporary times. There are five interrelated stages of Oron marriages: courting, asking for a girl's consent, working through a middleman, test of bride's character, and paying the bride dowry.

== Kingship ==
Ancient Oron people were governed by each Family Head, who settles every issue among the family. And this family head, in turn represents each family in the village traditional court. Then, a village head, an Offong is chosen. This is rotatory in the Village Court to represent their village in the community setting.

Traditionally, the Oron people have one king that rules over the land. He is known as the Ahta Oro.

=== Ahtaship ===
Ahtaship owes its origin to a legendary hunter, AHTA AYA-ARAH. He was a great hunter native to Eweme, the ancestral home of Oro Ukpabang. During a perilous time of hunger in the Middle Ages, AHTA AYA-ARAH, went out on his usual safari, but failed to return home the same day as should have been. The following day, the community met and set up a search party for a rescue, but all to no avail. One day led to one week, then one month passed by, and AHTA AYA-ARAH remained unfound.

Thereafter, a burial was done, believing that AHTA was dead, but surprisingly, two months after his disappearance, AHTA AYA-ARAH reappeared with species of sweet yams known in Oro today, as NYIN-ENI. When asked where he was, he said:

“Ku ntak mbiong ku isong, nkuka Abasi idide NYIN-ENI idi unadid”, meaning “Because of hunger in the land, I went to God to collect this yam for mankind”.

This is how Oro ended up with the axiom that:

“AHTA AYA-ARAH ekedeh NYIN-ENI Ku ABASI odi Oro – AHTA AYA-ARAH brought Sweet yams from God to Oro".

This feat, earned AHTA AYA-ARAH, the Oro kingship about over 500 years ago, such that the Royal Stool, the contemporary AHTA-ORO sits today, is the same Stool AHTA AYA-ARAH sat in the medieval age. This well-carved wooden Stool remains the oldest surviving artifact of Oro and in the Lower Cross River Basin.

The Ahta has all the Ofong (Ivong or Ifong) afaha and the paramount rulers as members of his traditional rulers council. Some high chiefs (for example, Ikpoto, Akpaha and Okete Okete) are also recognized by the Ahta's council. The Ahta is chosen among the Oldest of all the paramount rulers members of Council of Oro Traditional Ruler (COTR). The President-General of the Oron Union worldwide is regarded as the administrative head of the Oron nation and second-in-command at the Ahta's traditional rulers council.

== Secret societies ==
The most important secret societies of the Oron people are the 'Ekung', 'Ekpe', 'Nka', 'Inam', 'Abang', 'Ukpok', and 'lban Isong'. The last three named are women's societies.

=== Ekpe ===
The Ancient Oron Original way of ruling the Villages was through Isong before the advent of Ekpe which later became popular and important. In Oron level of governing every society was involved, by far the most important of it was the Ekpe. Despite the proximity of Oron to the Ibibio people, Ekpo was not known in Oron until the establishment of colonial rule.

There are considerably controversy as of how different Oron groups acquired the Ekpe. The Ukpabang groups claimed to have acquired their Ekpe from Usakadit in the Cameroons and brought it with them as they dispersed; meanwhile, the Iduas claimed to be the first to get in contact with the Ekpe which was originally owned by the Efut and Usakadit, when one man named Nta Nya on a fishing expedition one day met some Efut men at Ube Osukpong in Akpa Edok playing Ekpe. They went into negotiation with them on how to acquire Ekpe. The Okobo acknowledge to acquire their Ekpe from the Efiks of Old Calabar.

Ekpe became the legislative, Executive ad police system of Oron as every high chief and title owner most be a member of the Ekpe society, which is made up of seven grades in Oron: namely, Nyamkpe, Nkanda, Usongo, Ekpeyong, Esa, Ibang and Eyamba. Apart from the Nyamkpe, there are other two types of Ekpe in Oron, namely Obon and Ekpe Uko. The supreme head of the Ekpe was known as Offong Ekpie (Chief of Ekpe) whose authority could not be challenged by any of the members.

=== Ekung ===
The Ekung society is a male society whose members were distinguished from the Ekpe members by wearing the Iyara (red woolen cap), which was a mark of great honour and distinction in Oron. The society originally celebrated the martial prowess of its members in their old age. All village chiefs and elders were formally members of the Ekung society to enforce law and order in the society through the imposition of fines iki on those who broke community law.

=== Awan-idit (Ekpri-Akata) ===
This society was a male society intimately concerned on the moral fibre of the society. They were regarded as spirits, therefore ubiquitous and capable of knowing every scandal committed in the community. The main function of Akata was the detection of antisocial behavior, the popularization of crimes, and the ridiculing of culprits into correction. Akata members were famed in their ability to concoct songs to spotlight such offences as immoral association of sexes, pregnancy without husband, stealing, witchcraft and other crimes supposedly committed in the dark. The Akata was a mouth piece of informing the public about secret happenings in the Village.

=== Iban-Isong ===
This society is a female society which played an important role in the maintenance of law and order. Women organisation which was also known and regards as Abang led by their chief Offong Abang, the society exercised unquestionably authority over the affairs of women in each village with the primary intention of protecting the tendency of womanhood at both homes and marketplaces in order to create law and order in the society. With an entertainment of Abang dances, women of different age groups perform their dances' style in the village occasionally to bring togetherness in the society; meanwhile, the men in other societies made dry gin (Ufofo) in order to appease the women.

=== Nka ===
In Oron, every person in the community both male and female was expected to belong to an Nka, except the very young children. This society was set to enforce the norms of the village on its members who were at the grade of a same age. It was a socializing institution which taught members of the society the norms, law, and orders in the society and also contributed to the development of the community. In Oron, members often refer to themselves as Nda (Oron) and Adami (Okobo), punishment was given by the Nka on any members that disobey the norms and tradition of the society. The Nka are charged in corresponding roles in maintaining public sources of water supply, street, market, as well as guarding the village. In Okobo, the Nka UkparaIsong was charged in cleaning market square, stream, and streets; Nka Ufere look after the shrines and administered oaths for persons accused of witchcraft; Nka Ndito was charged in the general administration of the village and ensure orders; and Nka Eso acted as village guards. Among the Idua, Nka Mkparawa acted as warriors grade charged with responsibility of fighting off threats in the village, Nka Ndito Isong which membership was both for male and female was to enforce unity and development in the village. Among the Ukpabangs Nka includes, Nka Nlapp (for Youths), Nka Ikponwi (for elders), Nka Asian, Nka Ime, Nka Afe, Nka Nkwak and Nka Uteghe. Taken together this sets maintain roads, guard villages, constructed bridges and cleaned the markets.

== Geography ==
Oron is found in the flood plain of South Nigeria, with the land mainly intersected by numerous streams and tributaries flowing into Cross River, including the stubs creeks and Widenham forests. The entire coastline stretches from Uya Oron/Esin Ufot to Ebughu /Mbo through Udung Uko.

Oron is in the tropical region and has a uniformly high temperature all the year round. The two main seasons are the dry which spans between October and April and wet season which starts around May and ends in September. There are also two prevailing winds – the South-West onshore winds which brings heavy rains, and the North- East trade winds blowing across the Sahara Desert, which brings in the dry season.

The geopolitical restructuring of states and local government within Nigeria has seen the egalitarian society of the Oron Nation being fragmented politically in the Niger Delta. They have been divided across two separate Nigerian states, the Cross River State and Akwa Ibom State, and then into five Oron local government areas (LGAs) within the Akwa Ibom state:

- Urue-Offong/Oruko - Oron West
- Oron, Akwa Ibom - Oron Central
- Mbo, Akwa Ibom - Oron South
- Udung Uko - Oron East
- Okobo, Akwa Ibom - Oron North

In addition, Bakassi - Oron Peninsula, (Cross River State) is now in Cameroon, with the Stubs and Widenham Creeks/Forest now in Ibeno.

== Natural resources ==
Oron is known for its rich natural resources including oil and gas. The area has high prospects for increased oil exploration because it has been rated as having one of the highest natural gas deposits in sub-Saharan Africa. The region is extremely fertile and is known for its topographical Oil Palm Belt, tropical rainforest, swamps, and beaches. The mangrove forests also provide timber and raw materials for medicinal purposes, which includes a forest reserve in stubs and Widenham creeks/forest. There are also deposits of solid minerals such as iron, free silica or glass sand, and gravel. Seafoods such as crayfish, snipers, oyster, and periwinkle abound richly in all coastal areas.

Oron people are traditionally fishermen, traders, and famers. Although very rich in seafoods, palm oil, and farm crops, the area is mainly rich in crude oil: it has many oils wells and reserve. Oron Nation among the richest in crude oil deposits is found mainly in Urue Offong, Mbo, Okobo, Oron, and Udung Uko, having 94, 92, 86, 66, and 39 of such oil wells respectively. Even though actual oil exploration is going on in Mbo, Bakkasi Peninsula has many more than the former. Oron Nation also has a large deposit of clay and other solid minerals like gravel, fine stones, silica sand, etc.

== Population ==
Oron town is said to be the third largest city in Akwa Ibom state after Uyo and Eket. It has an indigenous population of over 600,000 people living within the city, who are traditionally fishermen, traders, and famers, with an influx number of migrants entering the city on a daily basis, with over 400,000 people living across Oron Nation around 2005.

== Education ==
The Oron People had from ancient times an educational system where individuals were grouped into age group known as Nka, whereby the young generation grouped in ages were being taught by the older ones through folklore, oral teaching, and ancient carvings. Meanwhile, the secret societies were taught through the Nsibidi.

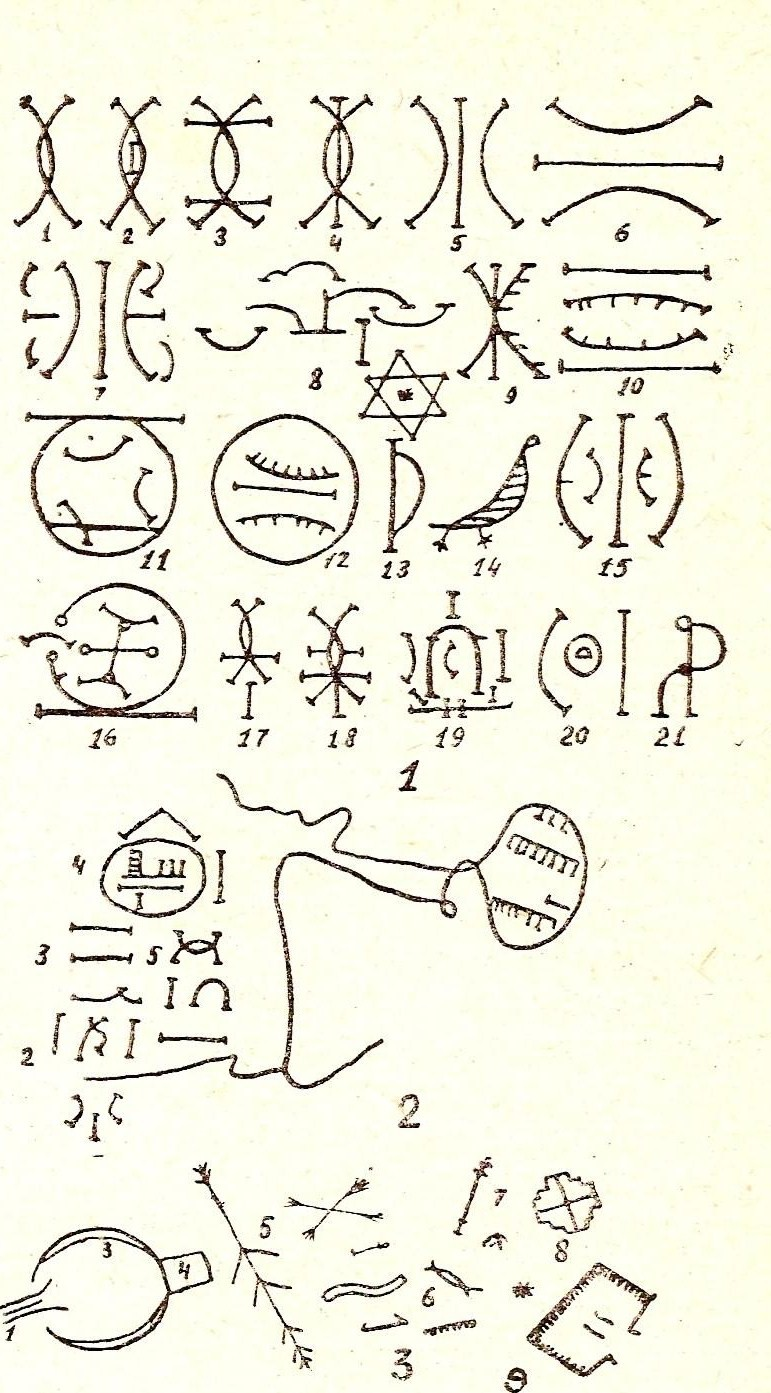
Nsibidi writing

Oron people were among the earliest to encounter Western education in West Africa. This is most evident in the establishment of the Hope Waddell Training Institute, Calabar in 1895 and the Methodist Boys' High School, Oron in 1905. These schools are two of the oldest in the history of Nigeria and attracted students from all over Western and Central Africa. Oron Nation also has the availability of the prestigious Maritime Academy of Nigeria, which is soon to become a Maritime University located at Oron Town: it was first established in 1977 as Nautical College, with thousands of Government and Private Secondary with primary schools built among Oron Nation.

== Politics ==
With a socio-cultural group called the Oron Union founded in 1925, the Oron people became one of the most formidable and vocal groups in the South-South region of Nigeria, hence one of the three political forces in the present day Akwa Ibom State.

Oron became a Division in August 1970, and in 1976 was made a local government area. However, following the local government creation exercise of the federal government in 1989, Oron was split into 3 Local Government Areas of Mbo, Oron and Okobo. Again in September 1991, Urue Offong/Oruko Local Government Area was carved out of Oron Local Government Area. Finally, in December 1996, Udung Uko Local Government Area was further carved out of Oron.

Recently, with the call for 1999 Constitutional Review, The Oron people have requested for the 5 Local Government Areas to be renamed using Oron as the common taxonomy. In the memorandum submitted to the National Assembly on behalf of Oron people by the Oron Union, Oron Think Tank and the Udung Uko Union in September 2020, and as presented in Port Harcourt (at Dr Obiwali Conference Centre) on 27–28 May 2021 before the Ad hoc senate Committee, and on 1–2 June 2021 in Uyo (Ibom Hall), IBB Way, Oron people want Oron Central to replace Oron LGA, Okobo LGA to be known as Oron North LGA, Urue Offong/Oruko LGA to be called Oron West LGA, Udung Uko LGA to be renamed Oron East LGA, and Mbo LGA to be recognised as Oron South LGA.

As part of the restructuring, the Oron people in each of those Memos also requested that the three Local governments created in 1983 but later dissolved be restored, and there should recreated and recognised as Oron North East w to be carved out of the present Okobo (Oron North) LGA ith headquarter at Utiemukoko, Oron South with headquarters in Oruko to be carved out of Urue Offong Oruko (Oron West) LGA, and Oron South South to be carved out of Mbo (Oron South) LGA with headquarter at Odu-Ebughu.

The Oron people have also demanded own state to be named Obolo State with Capital in Oron Nation. The state will have all the Components of Obolo ancestral bond in Akwa Ibom State, namely Oron Nation (5 Local Government Areas), Ibeno, Eastern Obolo, and the Andoni in Rivers State.

Similarly, Oron people are requesting restoration of her other two federal Constituencies, namely Oron II and Oron III to make a total of three Federal House of Representatives as Oron is observed to be the largest Federal Constituencies in the country.

While awaiting the creation of the State, according to one of the memos referenced above, Oron people prefers the Akwa South Senatorial District to be restructured to accommodate this Obolo Connection in Akwa Ibom State, as that to them will speed up development in the area and also give them the deprived opportunities to become senator. This arrangement will also provide the opportunity for her kith and kin (Ibeno and Eastern Obolo) to be given their own Federal Constituency.

Currently, the Oron people are still struggling in their attempts to properly place the Oron Union in a position to control their social political and economy interests in the state and country. In the past, the Oron Union has put up such structures as the Central Working Committee (CWC), Esumbuke Oro, and quite recently, the Oron Think-Tank, and many others to address certain issues. There have been some remarkable successes with these structures of late, but still much to be done when compared to the political expectation of the average Oron person within the State and Nigeria.

== Oron Union ==
Oron Union is the first organised and known ethnic union in Nigeria, was formed in Nigeria through the threesome initiative of Chiefs Ekpu Edubio Odoro, John Anwana Esin, and Okon Eyokunyi Isong, who later became the first modern Ahta Oro in 1975.

On the historic Sunday of April 26, 1925, Chiefs Ekpu Edubio Odoro and Anwana Osin Anwana, went visiting Okon Eyokunyi Isong in his residence, then a court clerk at Oron Native Court. While ventilating ideas on a number of issues, Chief E. E. Odoro, opined on the need to form a Union to address issues of Oro national interests from time to time. This was quickly adopted by J. A. Esin (Anwana Osin) and O. E. Isong, whereupon Chief J. A. Esin immediately brought out money for stationery to produce circulars and posters. Those were distributed to all Oro villages through the local churches to send their prominent leaders to the meeting fixed for Saturday, 23 May 1925, at the country home of Chief John Anwana Esin, Esin Ufot, Oron. There, 88 Oro patriots attended, thus marking the inauguration of ORON UNION. The second meeting was hosted by Chief William N. Umoh of Abiakowo Ebughu.

== Oron Bill Of Act (1999) ==
The Bill of Rights Of the Oron People was unanimously adopted and proclaimed by the General and Representative Assembly of the Oron Indigenous Ethnic Linguistic Nationality, Nigeria, at the Oron Civic Centre, Oron, Friday, 25 June 1999.

Under the leadership and guidance of Oron National Forum (ONAF) Oron Development Union (ODU) Oron Women Action Group (OWAG) Oron Youth Movement (OYOM) Oron Public Relations Committee (OPRC) Organised by ORON NATIONAL FORUM (ONAF) 200 Oron Road, Oron. 25 June 1999.

=== ENABLING RESOLUTION ===
We the proud youths and representatives of Oron people ~ Conscious of our historical role as the custodians of posterity;

Aware of our duties as protectors of our people, culture, civilization, heritage, destiny and rights as a free people and coherent nationality;

Fully informed about the status, experience and the prospects of our people in the Nigerian society;

Do hereby at the Representative Conference in the Oron Metropolis on the 25th day of June, 1999. Declare as follows:

Whereas the Oron people comprising the five Local Government Areas of Mbo, Udung-Uko, Okobo, Urue Offiong/Oruko and Oron in Akwa Ibom State of Nigeria had existed as an independent, sovereign nation for hundreds of years before the formation of Nigeria by the British imperial power; - Whereas the Oron Nation and people were never in any way consulted before they, including their land -were compromised by the British into the Nigeria contraption;

Whereas the Nigeria experience has completely manifested a threat that if not checked may culminate in the total extinction of Oron people, land and culture.

Be it Resolved and It Is Hereby resolved that in order to save the Oron Nation,

Oron People, Youths and Women all over the world unite under their patriotic organisations; ONAF, OYOM, OPRC, OWAG and others to proclaim the ORO BILL OF RIGHT as the embodiment of the grievances, principles and line of action in irreversible commitment to Oro meaningful survival; that Oron youths, women and people support and /or initiate any programme anywhere they deem fit for the achievement of the above purpose. The Bill of Rights of the Oron People All over the whole civilized world, the flame which provides warmth and beautifies every human society is said to be embedded in the youth who are also its herald of a new dawn and civilisation and to this end, we, the youths and people of Oron drawn from 200 communities of the eleven traditional clans spread across the five Local Government Areas, Oron, Mbo, Udung Uko, Uruko Offong/Oruko and Okobo of Oron Nation met today, the 25th Day of June, 1999 at the civic centre Oron to review the processes of our participation in the Nigerian State, a fate fostered on us by accident of history and respectively preview our match into the third millennium and accordingly State as Follows:

1. That Oron Nation had existed as a free sovereign and egalitarian society for hundreds of years before its coercive lumping into the amalgamated Nigeria in 1914 and is therefore older than Nigeria itself and should have been consulted before the exercise which signalled the beginning of the chastisements hitherto suffered by the Oron Nation.

2. That before the forcible incorporation of the Oron Nation into the Nigerian State in 1914, the land mass, territorial waters of Oron were larger than what has been arbitrarily determined for it today by the Nigerian State against what was identified in 1690s Dutch maps of old Calabar and Oron Intelligence Report in 1935.

3. That over the years, it has been widely established that the Oro people attach great importance to the creeks and water fronts, but frustratingly, they have continued to experience their waters and ocean fronts-their main source of sustenance-gradually seized from them.

The most conspicuous are:

(i) The Stubs and Widenham creeks/forest, water fronts as well as Oro fishing ports dotted along the Atlantic, littoral forceful annexed by Eket division in 1974 through the instrumentality of a Military Governor of Eket extraction, late Jacob Udoakaha Esuene.

(ii) That the Bakassi territorial area on the Oron eastern border with the Cameroon Republic was awarded in 1996 by the Federal Military Government to Cross River State in honour of some highly placed sons and daughters of that state for their closeness to Generals Ibrahim Babangida and Sani Abacha against the position of informed representation, documented facts before and during the colonial/early post-independent era.

4. That the Oron people have never had their dream of belonging to a political configuration of their choice realized as evident in our memoranda to the Irikete Panel on State Creation in 1975, the Political Bureau of 1986-87 and the 1996 Arthur Mbanefo Committee on States, Local Governments Creation and Boundary Adjustment thus showing organized efforts by the Nigerian State to systematically neutralize and Annihilate Oro identity, culture and heritage from the face of the earth.

5. That occasioned by neglect, marginalisation, repression, discrimination and deprivations, the story of Oro participation in the contraption called Nigeria has been one of stagnation and under development.

The following are examples:

(i) No Oron man has ever been appointed or elected a governor of a state and from 1984 till date, none of our sons and daughters has been deemed fit to hold ministerial position in spite of the fact that successive regimes in the country have zoned key positions to Akwa Ibom state.

(ii) No known project has been undertaken by the State and Federal governments within Oro during the period.

6. That although the Oron Nation has played host to oil exploration and exploitation activities which started with Shell in 1958 with capped wells dotted across the Oro landscape, there is nothing to show for it.

7. That despite the presence of Mobil Producing Nigeria Unlimited rigs within Oro territorial waters and in "disputed" waters, the Oron Nation has been denied its due, following the abrogation of offshore - onshore dichotomy as representations for Oro Local Government Areas to be in core catchment area of Mobil Producing Nigeria Unlimited have continued to fall on deaf ears. Of specific note is the fact that even paltry compensations for the January 1998 oil spill have not been paid to most communities and individuals in the Oro speaking Local Government Areas.

8. That our environment has been seriously degraded and abused over the years following indiscriminate activities of oil companies. Most agonising is the continued pollution of our coastal waters, rivers creeks and streams through the dumping of poisonous substances in our deep ocean trenches. Without mincing words, such acts have nonetheless placed our ocean's abundant wealth in jeopardy causing gross impoverishment of many fisherfolk and disrupting lives of coastal habitats and fish nursery grounds. These acts have therefore become very frustrating since right from the beginning of life in this part of Nigeria depends almost wholly on the sea. We live on the sea, die on the sea and as we come to see it today the prospects are dangerously grim and our hopes and security are dimming and worsening by the day. Oro people are encircled by the Nigerian State and its collaborators.

Now exploration activities have driven aquatic products from nearby fishing grounds into the high seas which requires expensive fishing gears such as large boats and outboat engines to enable our fishfolk to continue with their trade. But since then, these untold hardships caused us by the multinational oil companies and the Nigerian National Petroleum Company, NNPC no assistance has come from any quarter to cushion the effects of skyrocketing prices of fishing material.

9. That the unilateral determination and implementation of the Derivation Principle of Revenue Allocation by the Federal Government alone without inputs/representations from oil producing States and communities have been a major source of tension in the country. Such a policy has been left to the whims and caprices of the predatory military cliques who were until recently in control of power to the detriment of the oil producing areas.

10. That no positive impact of OMPADEC and Petroleum Trust Fund (PTF) services has been felt in Oro land since their inceptions, despite contributions from resources harnessed from Oro land and waters.

11. That the decision of the federal government to address the developmental problems of the Niger Delta through the Niger Delta Development Commission, though laudable, is not all embracing as it grossly omits some oil producing communities of the Niger Delta and represents palpable acquiescence; until a marginalised community engages the government in fierce battles, it is apparently not disposed to accede to the people's demands.

12. We note with regret that the non-constitution of a governing council for maritime academy of Nigeria, Oro, has given the sole administrator of the institution the licence to run the place like sole proprietorship. This has generated tension in our community. Most of the senior Oro personnel in the institution have been unjustly removed from service. Oro has been denied all benefits that should accrue to the community.

=== DECLARATION ===
In view of the above we, representatives of the Oron Nation, comprised in Oron popular organisations, here gathered, to wit

The Oron National Forum (ONAF), The Oron Development Union (ODU), The Oron Youth Movement (OYOM), The Oron Women's Action Group (OWAG), The Oron Revolutionary Youth Committee (ORAYCOM), The Oron Public Relations Committee (OPRC), and other popular, patriotic and democratic organisations

Hereby declare as follows:

1. That the manifest Destiny of the Oron Nation is in the hands of the Oron people, particularly the youth and broad masses.

2. That the achievement of the manifest destiny must be seen in the total security of the Oron geopolitical space which includes the people, the land, the culture and future.

3. That the processes and actions relevant in the achievement of the manifest destiny in no way be compromised by any Oron citizen even at the pains of death.

4. That the Oron Nation is prepared to exist within the Nigerian system if, and only if, the security of the land and people is assured by appropriate affirmative action by the Nigerian Sovereign State by way of a just, equitable and democratic conduct of the affairs of the federal republic of Nigeria through its constitutional, political administration and social policies nationwide and particularly as they affect the micro-minorities.

5. That the Oron Nation unequivocally reject the 1999 constitution of Nigeria on the following grounds:

(a) That it is arbitrary and undemocratic, imposed by a military cabal committed only to sectionalist interests

(b) It woefully fails to address the special interest of the micro-nationalities in the country.

(c) It does not respect and observe genuine federal principles upon which any viable pluralistic Nigerian political community must be built.

(d) It has grave feudalistic elements meant to undermine the small ethnic nationalities and the management of their resources and development interests.

=== DEMANDS ===
Fully conscious of the above facts and their implications, the People of Oron demand the following:

(1) All portions of Oron land and adjoining coast, that is, (i) the territory between Oro and the Republic of Cameroun (now called Bakassi) which is part of Mbo local government in Oro and had since been managed under Okolo/Oron Country Council or Oron Local Government. (ii) Esuk Inwang in Okobo Local Government Area settled in favour of Okobo by a competent court of law; (iii) The Stubs and Widenham creek forests with the adjoining coastal waters be immediately returned to the Oron Nation.

(2) The Oron Nation must be made a state within the Niger Delta Region.

(3) That the Federal Republic of Nigeria be restructured in six regions among which the Niger Delta Region comprising Cross River, Akwa Ibom, Rivers, Bayelsa, Delta and Edo States. Each Region logically will be made up of a group of states along geo-cultural lines.

(4) The regions should form the federating units each with the power to manage its affairs particularly development according to its cultural realities.

(5) Every region should control its resources 100% from which it will allocate funds for running the central government.

(6) The Central Government should only handle a small number of policies such as Foreign Affairs, Immigration, Currency, Customs etc.

(7) The control and composition of all security organizations be decentralized, for instance, the military should be controlled and formed on regional commands basis and administered as recommended by the Movement for National Reformation, Izon National Congress, Afenifere, Movement for the Survival of the Ogoni People (MOSOP), the Ohaneze, Uhrobo Union, The Alliance for Democracy, JACON and other patriotic, popular organizations in the country.

(8) The convening of a Sovereign National Conference of Ethnic Nationalities is imperative and should be facilitated by the nationalities to draw up a true democratic, federal structure for Nigeria.

(9) Oron people unequivocally and vigorously reject further existence in the present Akwa Ibom State owing to continuous marginalisation of Oron people by successive administrations all controlled by the majority Ibibio-Annang hegemony. This treatment has manifested in public appointments by the military controlled federal and state appointments as well as the Government of Governor Victor Attah.

(10) Oron nation hereby authorizes its National Joint Committee on Plans and Strategy to take necessary steps towards working with Ibeno and Eastern Obolo (Andoni) ethnic nationalities for a concrete joint programme of self determination of the three peoples.

(11) Oro Nation solicits the cooperation of all peoples and civilised world to come to her aid in securing and advancing her culture and protecting her heritage as a small indegeous nationality.

We, the Representatives of Oron People under the leaderships of the under-listed patriotic popular organisations hereby declare our total and everlasting Commitment to the Bill of Rights of the Oron People as an article of faith. So help us God.

List of Organisations Represented at the Conference on Oron Bill of Rights

1. Oron National Forum (ONAF) 2. Oron Development Union, (ODU) 3. Oron Youth Movement (OYM) 4. Mbo Youth Movement (MYM) 5. Oron Environmental Watch 6. Iguita Progressive Association 7. Oruco Development Association 8. Atak Oro Solidarity Front 9. Nka Mbek oro 10. Udung Uko Improvement Union 11. Uboro Youth Association 12. Oyubia community league 13. Utine Youth Association 14. Oyubia Youth Forum 15. Ebugha Youth Movement 16. Ikpe Oro Youth Forum 17. Oron Women Action Group (OWAG) 18. Oron Development Union, Women's Wing 19. Unyenge Progressive Association 20. Oron Liberation Movement (OLM) 21. Oron Youth Progressives 22. Nka-Ukio Akpakip Oro 23. Udung Uwe Youth Development Association 24. Ukuko Progressive Youth Club 25. Oron Public Relation Committee 26. National Association of Akpakip-Oro students 27. Uya-Oro Youth Association 28. Akwa Ibom Traders Association 29. Eyo-Abasi Youth Association 30. Idua Youth Association

== International airport ==
The Akwa Ibom Airport is situated in Oron Nation at Okobo, Akwa Ibom serving Uyo, the capital city of the Akwa Ibom state in Nigeria and other neighbouring towns in the state, including Eket, Ikot Ekpene and Oron. The administrative office of the airport is located in the nearby Uruan, Uyo LGA. Uruan is said to have an ancestral relationship with the Oron group, just like the Efik, Ibeno, Eastern Obolo, and Andoni groups.

The city is currently witnessing massive infrastructural development, such as the dualization of Oron-Eket Highway, construction of various intercity roads, health centers, schools, and housing estate projects to give the ancient city a facelift.

== Prominent people ==
Abang Okpo the Oron people Ancestral or putative father.

Prof Okon Uya Former Nigeria's Ambassador to Argentina, Peru, Paraguay and Chile for six years. A professor of history at the University of Calabar, Uya was appointed to conduct a new presidential poll after the annulment of the 12 June 1993 election.

Senator Akon Eyakenyi a Nigerian politician. She is the current deputy governor of Akwa Ibom.

Chief (Mrs.) Janet Amba, first female President General of the Oron Union

Sir (Amba) Etim Jack Okpoyo (First Deputy Governor of Akwa Ibom State, Engineer, businessman and politician).

Edet Amana (born 1938), Nigerian first civil engineer and former President of the Nigerian Academy of Engineering

Etim Inyang (25 December 1931 – 26 September 2016) was a Nigerian Policeman and former Inspector General of Police.

Nelson Effiong a Nigerian politician and senator representing Akwa Ibom South in the Nigerian Senate. He was also an Akwa Ibom State House of Assembly member 1992–2007.

Justice Okon Abang (lawyer) a judge of the Federal High Court

Sir Effiong Etienam (Aka Namoba National) (Oron prominent Businessman and Politician)

Sir Ambe-Abasi (co-founders of Oron Union in 1925).

Sir Lawrence Etim (co-founders of Oron Union in 1925).

Honourable Sir Tony Emenyi (co-founders of Oron Union in 1925).

Elder Bassey Jack Okpoyo (First Electrical Engineer in Akwa Ibom State and the first man to own a Petrol or Fueling station in Old Cross River State).

Chief John Anwana Esin (An influential British Political Agent, An industrialist, First Oro man to purchase and own a car when he purchased a 1924 Ford Model TT One, co-founders of Oron Union in 1925).

Offong Ekpu Edubio Odoro Edubio (A revolutionary and an interpreter for the Colonial Government in 1913–1925, co-founder of Oron Union)

His Royal Majesty, Okon Eyokunyi Isong (Kpongotte) (A writer of historic books such as The Origin of Oro Before The First Patrol and The Origin of Afaha Okpo dated In 1930, lay preacher, Methodist Church, 1970–1975, appointed president, Oron Customary Court and proclaimed first modern Ahta Oro, sitting on the same stool and adopting the same title, a medieval Oro Patriarch, Ahta Aya Ahrah, was identified with, more than 500 years earlier).

Dr. Esin Anwana Esin (first Oro medical doctor, a Senator and Federal Minister in the 1st Republic).

== Places In Oron ==
1. Oron Museum Nigeria
2. Oron Beach and Seafood Market
