= Ibibio-Efik languages =

Family of languages spoken in Nigeria

Ibibio
- Central Lower Cross
- Geographic distribution: Cross River State, Akwa Ibom State, Nigeria
- Ethnicity: Annang, Efik, Ibibio, Oro
- Linguistic classification: Niger–Congo?: Atlantic–Congo; Benue–Congo; Cross River; Lower Cross; Obolo; Ibibio
- Subdivisions: Anaang; Efik; Ibibio; Ukwa; Ubaghara; Oro; (See 'Varieties')

Language codes
- Glottolog: efik1244

Central Ibibio is the major dialect cluster of the Cross River branch of Benue–Congo. Efik proper has national status in Nigeria and was made the literary standard of the Ibibio language, though Ibibio proper has more native speakers.

== Varieties ==
Efik-Ibibio is a dialect cluster spoken by about 15 million people of Akwa Ibom State and about 5 million people of Cross River States of Nigeria, making it the fifth largest language cluster in Nigeria after Hausa, Yoruba, Igbo and Fulani.

The major Efik-Ibibio dialects are:

- Anaang (5.5 million speakers, 2018 estimate)
- Ibibio (15 million speakers, including L2 speakers, 2018 estimate)
- Efik (3 million speakers, 2018 estimate. Efik also has about 2 million second-language speakers.)

Minor varieties, according to Williamson and Blench, (Note: These are varieties of what Williamson and Blench (2000) calls "Central Lower Cross", which they list as "Efik, Ibibio, Anaang, Ibuoro, Ekit, Efai, etc.") are:

- Ekit (200,000 speakers), with dialect Etebi
- Efai (7,000 speakers)
- Ibuoro (20,000 speakers), with dialects Ibuoro proper, Ito, Itu Mbon Uzo and Nkari
- Eki (5,000 speakers)
- Idere (5,000 speakers)
- Ukwa (100 speakers)

These arguably constitute a single language, though Ethnologue considers them to be separate.

== Akwa Akpa and Akwa Ibom ==
Before colonial times, Akwa Akpa was the original name for Calabar, the main city of the Efik people, while the southern section of the Efik-Ibibio people was known as Akwa Ibom which later became a separate state. Many people are calling for the name of Cross River State to be changed to Akwa Akpa State.

== See also ==
- Eket
- Nsibidi
- Ekpe
- Calabar
- Southeastern Nigeria
