= Abang Okpo =

Ancestor of the Oron Ukpabang people

Abang Okpo Nyuserre Ini as popular known in Oron Nation is the grandson of Nyuserre Ini, he is also known as the Ancestral and putative father of the Oron Ukpabang people predominant in present day Akwa Ibom State, Cross River State of Nigeria and the Cameroon.

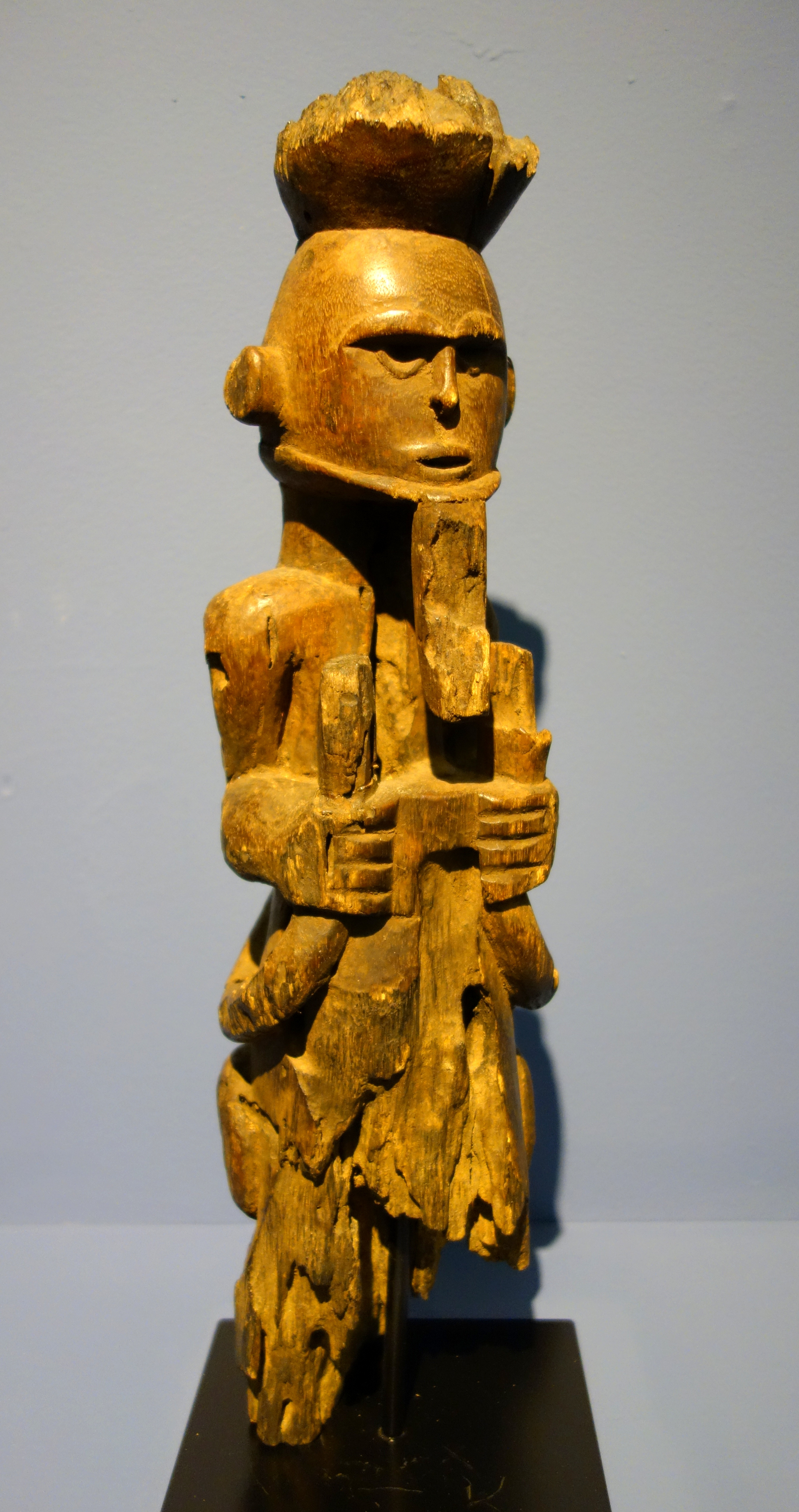
Abang Okpo

== Life ==
According to Oron folklores Abang was the grandson of Nyuserre Ini an Ancient Egyptian pharaoh, the sixth ruler of the Fifth Dynasty during the Old Kingdom period. Nyuserre was the younger son of Neferirkare Kakai and queen Khentkaus II, and the brother of the short-lived king Neferefre (meaning "least they forget" in Oron). He is credited with a reign of 24 to 35 years depending on the scholar, and likely lived in the second half of the 25th century BCE. Abang left the Mediterranean region with his followers in the 24th century BCE at a tender age in order to establish a new Kingdom.

Oron folklore tells of Abang Okpo as a powerful warrior and the Chief wrestler of the art-form known as `Mbok'. The wrestling known as (Mbok) has been part and parcel of the Oron people and the date of its origin is unknown. It is said that Abang and his followers made it popular in the Mediterranean.

Abang in his advent of establishing a kingdom was said to have wandered with his children and followers through the Sudanic belt possibly presently into present Uganda, Zaire Congo Basin as a result of the war of the Pygmies (a dwarfish people of Equatorial Africa) which had scattered most of the Africans – known to Oro people as

“ekung amamisim-isim asuan ofid oduobot".

then they settle within the region now known as Jigawa State in Nigeria which is written and pronounce as `Oronny` inline with Oros` phonemes migration, as he was not comfortable among the Hausa, he made a major stop in the Cameroons Usahadit and Bakassi precisely called Isangele (Usakedet). That is why there is a prevalence of Oron names as Akan, Ekang, Abang, Etong, Osung, and Etang in the Cameroons today.

At Usangale Abang begot Do, who begat Donni, who in turn beget Oron and Obolo and their children with others in Usahadit. This tradition emphasize the now and former accepted relationship between the Oron people and Obolo people, Oro (called Adon by the Obolo) who is said to have led the people out of Cameroon, which have been celebrated between them in the past and present till the 1940s.

== Death ==
Abang, his followers and their descendants did not know that other people were already established on that land and due to dispute over farmland, and fishing space, the group later moved on to their original homeland of Oron Nation, Andoni people and Bakassi without Abang who died in Usahadit.
