= Udung Okpor =

Udung Okpor Udung Okpor Oro
- Village
- Country: Nigeria
- State: Akwa Ibom
- Local Government Area: Urue-Offong/Oruko

Udung Okpor is an Oron Village in Urue-Offong/Oruko local government area of Akwa Ibom state in Nigeria.

Udung Okpor is formed by the children of Okpor whose father was Ekete Okpo who found primacy at Okpe Oruko after the spread the Ubodung clan in Oron Nation.
