= List of critically endangered languages =

Languages considered at risk of extinction

This Article is a list of languages and dialect that are considered "critically endangered" by the UNESCO World Heritage Foundation.

Language	Speakers	Location	Notes
Parji	51,200	India	
Zenatiya	50,000	Morocco, Algeria	
Mayo	32,870	Mexico	
Sirmaudi	31,140	[No Info.]	No Information on where the language is spoken
Tidikelt	30,000	Algeria	
Gadaba	26,270	India	
Koraga	16,665	India	
Pangvali	16,290	India	
Yakkha	14,640	Nepal, India	
Kuruba	14,613	India	
Bangani	12,000	India	
Northern Totonac	11,530	Mexico	
Lamgang	10,000	India	
Muot	10,000	Nicobar (India)	
Naiki	10,000	India	
Argobba	8,000	Ethiopia	
Awa-Cuaiquer	7,495	Colombia, Ecuador	
San Francisco del Mar Huave	6,874	Mexico	
Sawkna	6,000	Zimbabwe	
Anung	5,000	China, Myanmar	
Ilue	5,000	Nigeria	
Pu	5,000	China	
