= EKI =

Eki or EKI may refer to:

- Eki (goddess), Basque solar deity
- Eki language, spoken in Nigeria
- Eki Nurhakim (born 1983), Indonesian footballer
- Institute of the Estonian Language (Estonian: Eesti Keele Instituut)
- Elkhart Municipal Airport, Indiana, United States
- Eklakhi Junction railway station, West Bengal, India
