= Udung Uwe =

Udung Uwe Udung Uwe
- Village
- Location in Nigeria
- Country: Nigeria
- State: Akwa Ibom
- Local Government Area: Urue-Offong/Oruko

Udung Uwe is an Oron Village in Urue-Offong/Oruko local government area of Akwa Ibom state in Nigeria.

Formed by the children of Uwe whose father was Ekete Okpo who found primacy at Okpe Oruko after the spread of the Ubodung clan in Oron Nation.
