= Ibono language =

Lower Cross River language of Nigeria

Ibono
- Ibeno
- Native to: Nigeria
- Region: Akwa Ibom State
- Native speakers: (10,000 cited 1989)e29
- Language family: Niger–Congo?: Atlantic–Congo; Benue–Congo; Cross River; Lower Cross; Ibono

Language codes
- ISO 639-3: ibn
- Glottolog: Ibon1241
- ELP: Ibino

Ibono (also known as Ibono-Obolo, Ibeno, Ibuno, Ibino; endonymn: Ibọnọ), is a Lower Cross River language of Nigeria. It is spoken in Ibeno LGA of Akwa Ibom State, Nigeria.

Ibọnọ is an agglutinative, tonal, SVO language.

== See also ==
- Obolo language
