= Iko language =

Lower Cross River language of Nigeria

Iko
- Native to: Nigeria
- Region: Akwa Ibom State
- Ethnicity: Obolo
- Native speakers: (5,000 cited 1988)
- Language family: Niger–Congo?: Atlantic–Congo; Benue–Congo; Cross River; Lower Cross; Iko

Language codes
- ISO 639-3: iki
- Glottolog: ikoo1245

Iko is a Lower Cross River language of Nigeria. Speakers are ethnically, though not linguistically, Obolo.
