= Oyubia =

Oyubia Eyo-Abia
- Town
- Location in Nigeria
- Country: Nigeria
- State: Akwa Ibom
- Local Government Area: Urue-Offong/Oruko

Oyubia is an Oron town in Urue-Offong/Oruko local government area of Akwa Ibom state in Nigeria.
