= Anai Okpo =

Anai Okpo Anai Okpo
- Community
- Country: Nigeria
- State: Akwa Ibom
- Local Government Area: Urue-Offong/Oruko

Anai Okpo is an Oron Community in Urue-Offong/Oruko local government area of Akwa Ibom state in Nigeria. Anai Okpo was founded by Okpo, one of the sons of Ekete Okpo. He found privacy at Okpe Oruko after the spread of the Ubodung clan.
