= Akpakip Oro =

Early modern state in Nigeria

Oron Nation Akpakip Oro
- 1200 CE–1909 CE
- Motto: Ãfãŋ kí
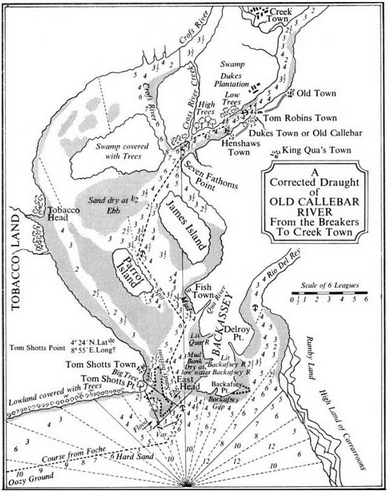
- Map of Calabar River drawn by the Portuguese, showing Akpakip Oro as Tom Shotts in the SW, Bakassi as Backassey in the SE (which is part of Akpakip Oro) and the Efik Akwa Akpa Kingdom above.
- Capital: Akana Obio Oro
- Common languages: Nsíŋ Oro
- Religion: Oron Traditional Religion
- Government: Selective monarchy
- Tribal chiefs
- Ahta Oro
- History
  - Established: 1200 CE
  - Surrender to Britain: 1909 CE
  - Socio-political revival: 1925
- Currency: Okuk
Preceded by	Succeeded by
Ekpu Oro	Niger Coast Protectorate

The Oron Nation (Akpakip Oro) was a sovereign and egalitarian society from c. 1200 until 1914 when it was forcibly incorporated into Nigeria. The Oron people share a strong ancestral lineage with the Efik people in Cross River State, Nigeria. Related indigenous groups include the Uruan, Ibeno, and Andoni people (the Obolo), located in both in Akwa Ibom State and in Rivers State, along with the Balondo-ba-Konja. (Note: The Balondo Civilization originated in the area of the modern-day Democratic Republic of Congo. The Balondo-ba-Konja now live in the southwest coastal region of Cameroon.) The Oron people are a major ethnic group still present in Akwa Ibom.

== History ==
By 1200, the Oro people, consisting of six ethnic tribal groups, had settled on the mouth of the Cross River basin, and had become a society ruled by tribal chiefs. The Oro Nation elevated its first king to power in the late 1200s, when a legendary hunter from the Oro Nation known as Ahta aya-Arah went out on a safari and failed to return. The following day, the people from the Nation set up a search party to find him, but were unsuccessful.

Ahta was declared dead but, two months after his disappearance, he reappeared with a species of sweet yams known in Oro as Nyin-Eni. When asked where he was, he said that "because of hunger in the land, I went to God to collect this yam for mankind." This is how Oro ended up with the axiom that "Ahta aya-Arah brought sweet yams from God to Oro." This feat earned Ahta the Oro kingship in the late 1200s, such that the Royal Stool was crafted for Ahta. This stool remains the oldest surviving artifact of Oro and in the Lower Cross River Basin.

Ahta aya-Arah brought the six tribes that made up the Oron Nation together by introducing this yam to the different clans, which visited him daily, with his influence reaching Cameroon. Some of the tribes included the:

- Oron Ukpabang people
- Okobo people
- Idua (Asang) people
- Enwang people
- Ebughu Otong people
- Efiat/Mbo people

To this day, the people there still consider themselves part of the Oron Nation.

The Oro Nation prospered as an independent community with a rotatory system of kingship among the different tribal leaders.

In the late 1800s, Portuguese traders named the Oron region the Tom Shotts Town, the Mbo region as the Tom Shotts Port, and the island in Ibaka as Tom Shotts Island, as seen in several Portuguese maps.

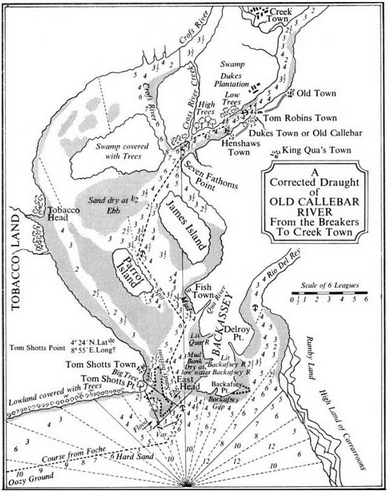
Map of the Cross River estuary c. 1820

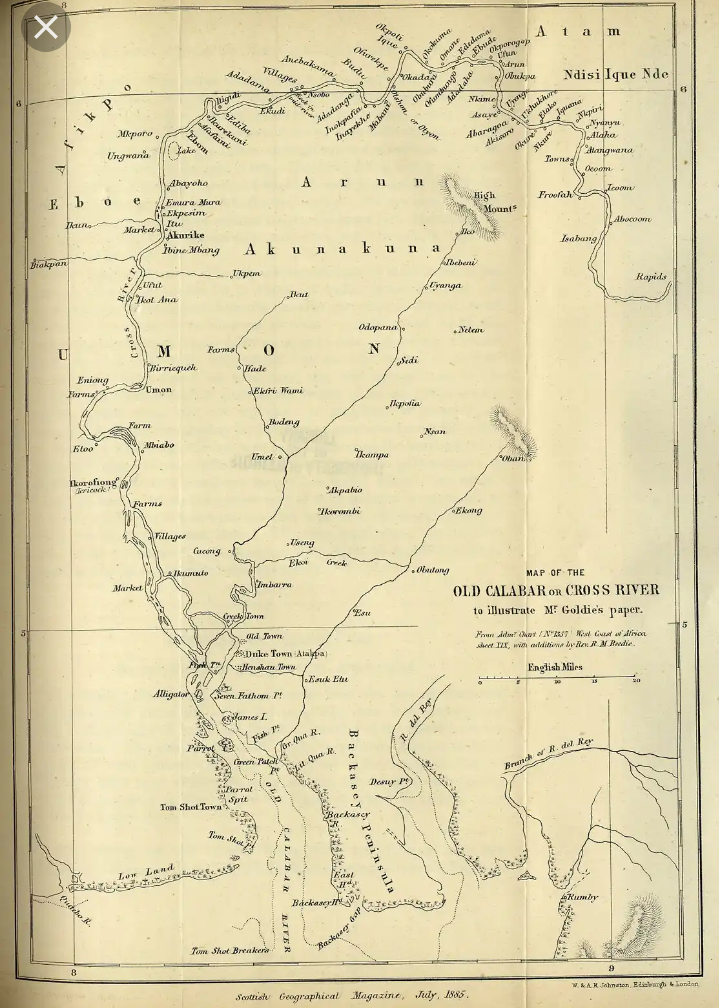
Old Cross River showing Oron as Tom Shotts Town, 1885

In the late 1800s, Portuguese raiders pushed several Oron clans into the hinterland. This brought about the first shed known as Obio Ufre ('an unforgettable spot'). At that unforgettable spot, it was therefore agreed that "Oro clans will rise in alliance to defend their own when attacked by non-Oro clans." Migration from the region subsequently led to the establishment of several villages within Oro.

The kingdom functioned as a free sovereign and egalitarian society until from the late 1800s until 1909, when the British invaded the region and forcibly absorbed it into the Southern Nigeria Protectorate. In early 1925, the Oro Nation had a political revival, with the reestablishment of the Oron Union and Ahtaship in the region.

== Secret societies ==
The most important secret societies of the Oron people are the Ekung, Ekpe, Nka, and Inam, as well as the women's societies, Abang, Ukpok, and lban Isong.

=== Ekpe ===
The ancient Oron original way of ruling the villages, before the advent of Ekpe, was through Isong. In Oron, every society was involved in governing, but by far the most important was the Ekpe. Despite the proximity of Oron to the Ibibio people, Ekpo was not known in Oron until the establishment of colonial rule.

There is considerable controversy as of how different Oron groups acquired the Ekpe. The Ukpabang groups claimed to have acquired their Ekpe from Usakadit in Cameroon and brought it with them as they dispersed, while the Iduas claimed to be the first to be in contact with the Ekpe. The Ekpe was originally owned by the Efut and Usakadit, when one day a man named Nta Nya who was on a fishing expedition met some Efut men at Ube Osukpong in Akpa Edok playing Ekpe. They went into negotiation to acquire Ekpe. The Okobo acknowledge they acquired their Ekpe from the Efiks of Old Calabar.

Ekpe became the legislative, executive, and police system of Oron as every high chief and title owner had to be a member of the Ekpe society, which is made up of seven grades in Oron: Nyamkpe, Nkanda, Usongo, Ekpeyong, Esa, Ibang, and Eyamba. Apart from the Nyamkpe, there are two other types of Ekpe in Oron: Obon and Ekpe Uko. The supreme head of the Ekpe was known as Offong Ekpie (Chief of Ekpe), whose authority could not be challenged by any other member.

=== Ekung ===
The Ekung is a male society whose members were distinguished from the Ekpe members by wearing the Iyara, a red woolen cap, which was a mark of great honor and distinction in Oron. The society originally celebrated the martial prowess of its members in their old age. All village chiefs and elders were formally members of the Ekung society to enforce law and order in the society through the imposition of fines (iki) on those who broke community law.

=== Awan-idit (Ekpri-Akata) ===
Awan-idit, or Ekpri-Akata was a male society intimately concerned with morals. They were regarded as "spirits," ubiquitous and capable of knowing every scandal committed in the community. The main function of Akata was to detect antisocial behavior, publicize crimes, and ridicule of culprits into correction. Akata members were famed for their ability to concoct songs to spotlight offenses like immoral association between the sexes, pregnancy without a husband, stealing, witchcraft, and other crimes supposedly committed in the dark. The Akata was a mouthpiece to inform the public of secret happenings in the village.

=== Iban-Isong ===
Iban-Isong is a female society that played an important role in maintaining law and order. The women's organization, also known as Abang and led by their chief Offong Abang, exercised unquestionable authority over the affairs of women in each village. The society had the primary goal of protecting womanhood both in the home and in public. In the Abang dances, an entertainment occasionally performed in the villages, women of different age groups displayed their dance styles, fostering togetherness. In other, male, societies, the men made dry gin (Ufofo) to appease the women.

== Education ==
The Oron People had an ancient educational system where individuals were grouped into age groups known as Nka, in which the older children taught the younger ones using folklore, oral teaching, ancient cravings, and through the Nsibidi.

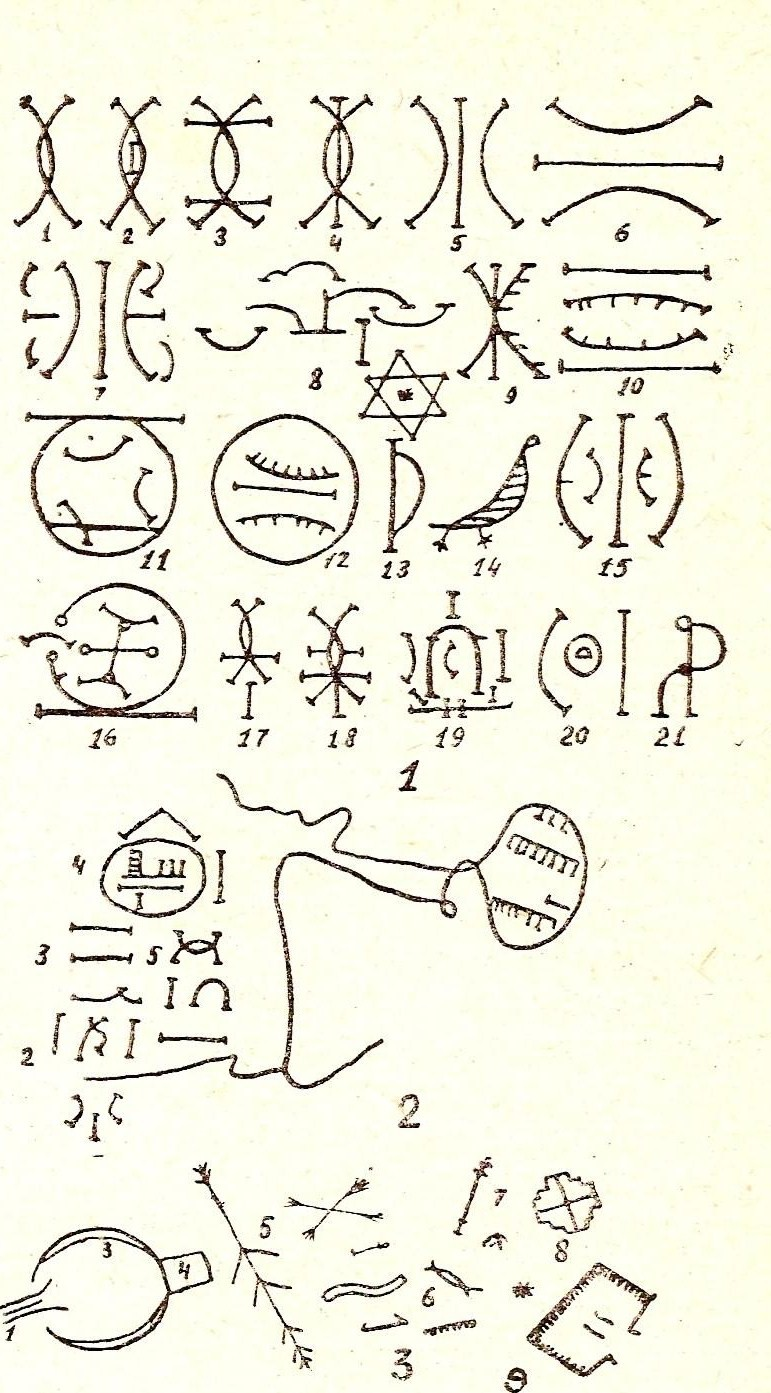
Nsibidi writing

In Oron, every person in the community both male and female, except very young children, was expected to belong to an Nka. This society was set to enforce the village norms on members, carried out by community members who were the same age. This institution socialized members in the norms, laws, and order and contributed to community development. In Oron, members often referred to themselves asNda (Oron) and Adami (Okobo). The Nka punished any members that disobeyed the society's norms and traditions. The Nka were charged in a corresponding role to maintain public the public water supply and street markets, as well as guard the village.

- Nka UkparaIsong was charged with cleaning market squares, streams, and streets.
- Nka Ufere looked after the shrines and administered the oath for a person accused of witchcraft.
- Nka Ndito was charged with the general administration of the village and ensured order.
- Nka Eso acted as village guards.
- Among the Idua, Nka Mkparawa acted as warriors responsibile for fighting off threats in the village
- Nka Ndito Isong, whose membership was open to both men and women, enforced unity and development in the village.
- Among the Ukpabangs Nka were: Nka Nlapp (for youths), Nka Ikponwi (for elders), Nka Asian, Nka Ime, Nka Afe, Nka Nkwak, and Nka Uteghe. Taken together this group maintained roads, guarded villages, constructed bridges, and cleaned the markets.

== See also ==
- Andoni people
- Oron people
