= Okon Abang =

Oron lawyer and judge

Hon. Justice Okon Efreti Abang

Judge in the Court of Appeal, Nigeria.

Personal details
- Born: Oduo-Edughu Mbo L.G.A
- Citizenship: Nigerian
- Education: University of Calabar, Nigerian Law School
- Profession: Judge

Hon Justice Okon Efreti Abang (born 10 January 1961) He is of Oron extraction and a Judge in the Court of Appeal].

== Background ==
He was Born on 10 January 1961 in Oduo-Ebughu Mbo LGA. He attended the Central School Ebughu Mbo L.G.A. (Akwa Ibom State),(January 1968 – June 1973) then, St.Vincent's Secondary School Oti – Oron, Oron L.G.A (Akwa Ibom State)(September 1973 -June 1978) and School of Basic Studies Akampa, Cross River State (September 1980 – June 1982), University of Calabar – October 1993 – June 1987 and Nigerian Law School Victoria Island, Lagos from October 1987 – June 1988. Where he got F.S.L.C.E - June 1973, WASC/GCE – June 1978, HSC (3 papers) at a sitting – June 1982, LL.B Hons (Second Lower) – June 1987, B.L (second Lower) – June 1988 and was call to Bar on 3 November 1988.

He was the presiding lawyer over the case of Metuh money scandal.
