= Lower Cross River languages =

Group of Nigerian languages

Lower Cross River
- Ibibioid
- Geographic distribution: Nigeria; Roughly west of the Imo estuary to east of the Cross estuary. lower Southwest Cameroon
- Linguistic classification: Niger–Congo?: Atlantic–Congo; Benue–Congo; Cross River; Lower Cross River
- Subdivisions: Obolo; Lower Cross proper (Ibibioid)

Language codes
- Glottolog: obol1242

Ibibioid is one of the Niger-Congo family of languages. It is often referred to as the Ibibio-Efik or the Efik-Ibibio languages/language cluster. All the languages or dialects spoken in Akwa Ibom and Cross River states belong to this specific branch of Benue-Congo, within the wider Niger-Congo language family.

The Lower Cross River languages form a branch of the Cross River languages of Nigeria's geographical southeast. They consist of the divergent Obolo language or Andoni, (200,000 speakers), and the core of the branch, which includes over 15 million speakers of the Efik-Ibibio laanguage cluster.

- Obolo
- Lower Cross proper: Efik-Ibibio, Ibino (Ibeno), Oro (Oron), Okobo, Iko, Ebughu, Ilue, Enwang-Uda, Usaghade

Additionally, Ethnologue lists several more languages including the Ubaghara language within the Efik-Ibibio cluster. (See Ibibio-Efik languages.)

Forde and Jones (1950) considered Ibino and Oro to be Efik-Ibibio.

== Names and locations ==
Below is a list of language names, populations, and locations from Blench (2019).

| Language | Branch | Dialects | Alternate spellings | Own name for language | Endonym(s) | Other names (location-based) | Other names for language | Exonym(s) | Speakers | Location(s) | Notes |
|---|---|---|---|---|---|---|---|---|---|---|---|
| Ebughu | | | | Ebughu | Ebughu | Oron | | | more than 5,000 (1988) | Akwa Ibom State, Mbo and Oron LGAs | |
| Enwang | | | | Enwang | Enwang | Oron (incorrectly) | | | estimated 50,000 plus (1988) | Akwa Ibom State, Mbo LGA | |
| Iko | | | | Iko | | Obolo (incorrectly included within Obolo) | | | Three villages: 5,000+ (1988) | Akwa Ibom State, Eastern Obolo LGA | |
| Ilue | | | Idua | Ilue | | | | | 5,000 (1988); diminishing | Akwa Ibom State, Oron LGA | |
| Ọkọbọ | | | | | | | | | 11,200 (1945 F&J); 50,000 | Akwa Ibom State, Okobo LGA | |
| Uda | | | | Uda | | | | | 10,000 plus (1988) | Akwa Ibom State, Mbo LGA | |
| Ukwa | | | | | | | | | | Cross River State, Akampka LGA | |
| Usaghade | | | Usakade(t) | Usaghade | | Isangele | | | estimate 10,000 (1990) although mostly in Cameroon | Cross River State, Odukpani LGA; mainly in Cameroon, Isangele sub–division | |
| Idere | | | | Idere | | | | | more than 5,000 (1988) | Akwa Ibom State, Itu LGA | no data |
| Efai | | | | Efai | | | Effiat (from Efik) | | >5,000 (1988 est.) | Akwa Ibom State, Mbo LGA; Cameroon, Isangele sub–division | |
| Ọrọ | | | Oron | Ọrọ (Oro) | Ọrọ (Oro) | | | | 319,000 (1963 per Kuperus) | Akwa Ibom State, Oron LGA | |
| Ito | | | | Ito | | | | | 5,000 plus (1988) | Akwa Ibom State, Akamkpa LGA | no data |
| Eki | | | | Eki | | | | | 5000 plus (1988) | Cross River State | no data |
| Etebi | Central | | | Etebi | | Oron (incorrectly); Ekit (incorrectly) | | | estimate 15,000 (1989) | Akwa Ibom State, Uquo Ibeno LGA | |
| Itu Mbon Uzo | Central | | Itu Mbuzo | Itu Mbon Uzo | | | | | 5,000 plus (1988) | Akwa Ibom State, Ikono LGA | |
| Anaang | Central | Abak, Ikot Ekpene, Ukanafun | Annang, Anang, Anaŋ | | | | | | 246,000 (F&J 1944-5): estimated 1,000,000 (1990) | Akwa Ibom State, Ikot Ekpene, Essien Udim, Abak, Ukanafun and Oruk–Anam LGAs | |
| Efik | Central | | | | | Calabar | | | 26,300 (1950 F&J), 10,000 in Cameroon; 360,000 first language speakers; spoken as a second language by 1.3 million (UN 1960), 3.5 million (1986 UBS) diminishing | Cross River State, Calabar municipality, Odukpani and Akamkpa LGAs; and in Cameroon | |
| Ekit | Central | | Ekid, Eket | | | | | | 22,000 (1952 W&B); estimated 200,000 (1989) | Akwa Ibom State, Eket and Uquo Ibeno LGAs | |
| Ibibio | Central | Nkari, Enyong, Central, Itak, Nsit etc. roughly according to clans | Ibibyo | | | | | | 800,000 (1952) (may include Efik); 283,000 (1945 F&J); 2 million (1973 census); estimated 2.5 million (Ibibio proper 1990) | Akwa Ibom State, Ikono, Itu, Uyo, Etinan, Ekpe–Atai, Uruan, Nsit–Ubium, Onna, Mkpat Enin and Abasi LGAs | |
| Ibuoro | Central | | | Ibuoro | | | | | 5,000 plus (1988) | Akwa Ibom State, Itu and Ikono LGAs | |
| Obolo | West | From West to East: Ataba, Unyeada, Ngo, Okoroete, Ibot Obolo | | | Òbólò | Andoni | | | 22,400 (1944 F&J); 90,000 (1983 Aaron); 100,000 (Faraclas 1989) | Rivers State, Andoni LGA: western dialects; Akwa Ibom State, Eastern Obolo LGA: eastern dialects | |
| Ibinọ | West | | Ibuno, Ibeno | | | | | | 10,000 (Faraclas (1989) | Akwa Ibom State, Ibeno LGA | |

== Reconstructions ==
Proto-Lower Cross River has been reconstructed by Connell (n.d.)

== See also ==
- List of Proto-Lower Cross River reconstructions (Wiktionary)
