= Usaghade language =

Lower Cross River language of Cameroon and Nigeria

Usaghade
- Usak Edet
- Native to: Cameroon, Nigeria
- Region: Cross River State
- Ethnicity: Isanguele, Isangele
- Native speakers: (10,000 in Cameroon cited 1990) unknown number in Nigeria
- Language family: Niger–Congo?: Atlantic–Congo; Benue–Congo; Cross River; Lower Cross; Usaghade

Language codes
- ISO 639-3: usk
- Glottolog: usag1244

Usaghade, Isanguele or Isangele is a small Lower Cross River language spoken in the southwestern region of southern Cameroon, with some speakers across the border in Cross River State, Nigeria.
