= James Town Mbo =

James Town
- Town
- Location in Nigeria
- Country: Nigeria
- State: Akwa Ibom
- Local Government Area: Mbo, Akwa Ibom

James Town is an Effiat Town in Mbo local government area of Akwa Ibom state in Nigeria.
