= Ibuoro language =

Ibibio-Efik language of Nigeria

Ibuoro
- Native to: Nigeria
- Region: Akwa Ibom State, Abia State
- Native speakers: (20,000 cited 1988–1998)
- Language family: Niger–Congo?: Atlantic–Congo; Benue–Congo; Cross River; Lower Cross; Ibibio-Efik; Ibuoro

Language codes
- ISO 639-3: Variously: ibr – Ibuoro proper itw – Ito itm – Itu Mbon Uzo nkz – Nkari
- Glottolog: ibuo1241
- ELP: Ibuoro

Ibuoro is an Ibibio-Efik language of Nigeria. Its dialects are Ibuoro proper, Ito, Itu Mbon Uzo and Nkari.
