= Oron Museum =

National museum in Oron, Nigeria

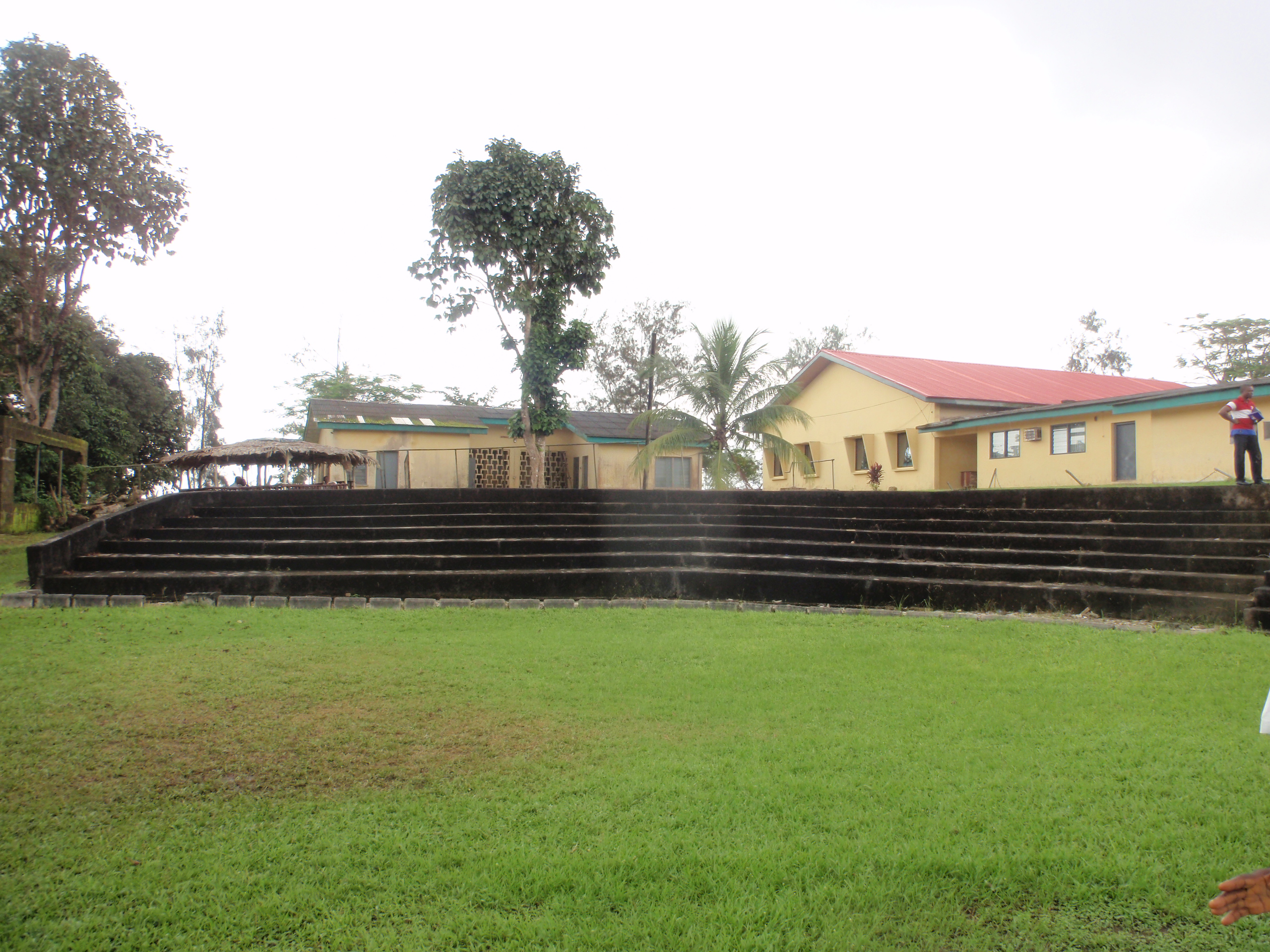
- Established: 7 December 1958
- Location: Oron, Akwa Ibom, Nigeria
- Coordinates: 4.82762°N 8.23091°E

Oron Museum is a museum in Oron, Nigeria. The museum was established in 1958 to accommodate eight hundred known ancestral figures (Ekpu Oro) of the Oron people which are believed to be among the oldest and finest surviving wood carvings in Africa. During the civil war, many of the wood carvings were looted and the museum was damaged. In 1975, the museum was reinaugurated and today houses the remains of the wooden sculptures and other ethnographic materials from across Nigeria. The museum also has displays of bunkers used during the civil war as well as a crafts village.

In 2023, the governor of Akwa Ibom state, Pastor Umo Eno renovated the Oron Museum.
