= Efai language =

Ibibio-Efik language of Nigeria

Efai
- Native to: Nigeria
- Region: Akwa Ibom State
- Native speakers: (7,200 cited 2000)
- Language family: Niger–Congo?: Atlantic–Congo; Benue–Congo; Cross River; Lower Cross; Ibibio-Efik; Efai

Language codes
- ISO 639-3: efa
- Glottolog: efai1241

Efai is an Ibibio-Efik language Oro language of Nigeria.
