= Ekpu Oro =

Ekpu Oro are ancient carved wooden images made from the 'Oko' tree representing the ancestral father of the Oron people of the Akpakip Oro kingdom. The Earliest known ancient wooden carving images of the Oron people is dated to the 2370BC.

Found today in the Oron Museum and other museums around the world, Some of the finest wooden statuary attributed to Oron people were beautifully carved ekpu (ancestral figures) which were destroyed and removed from Nigeria during the Biafran war in the late 1960s.

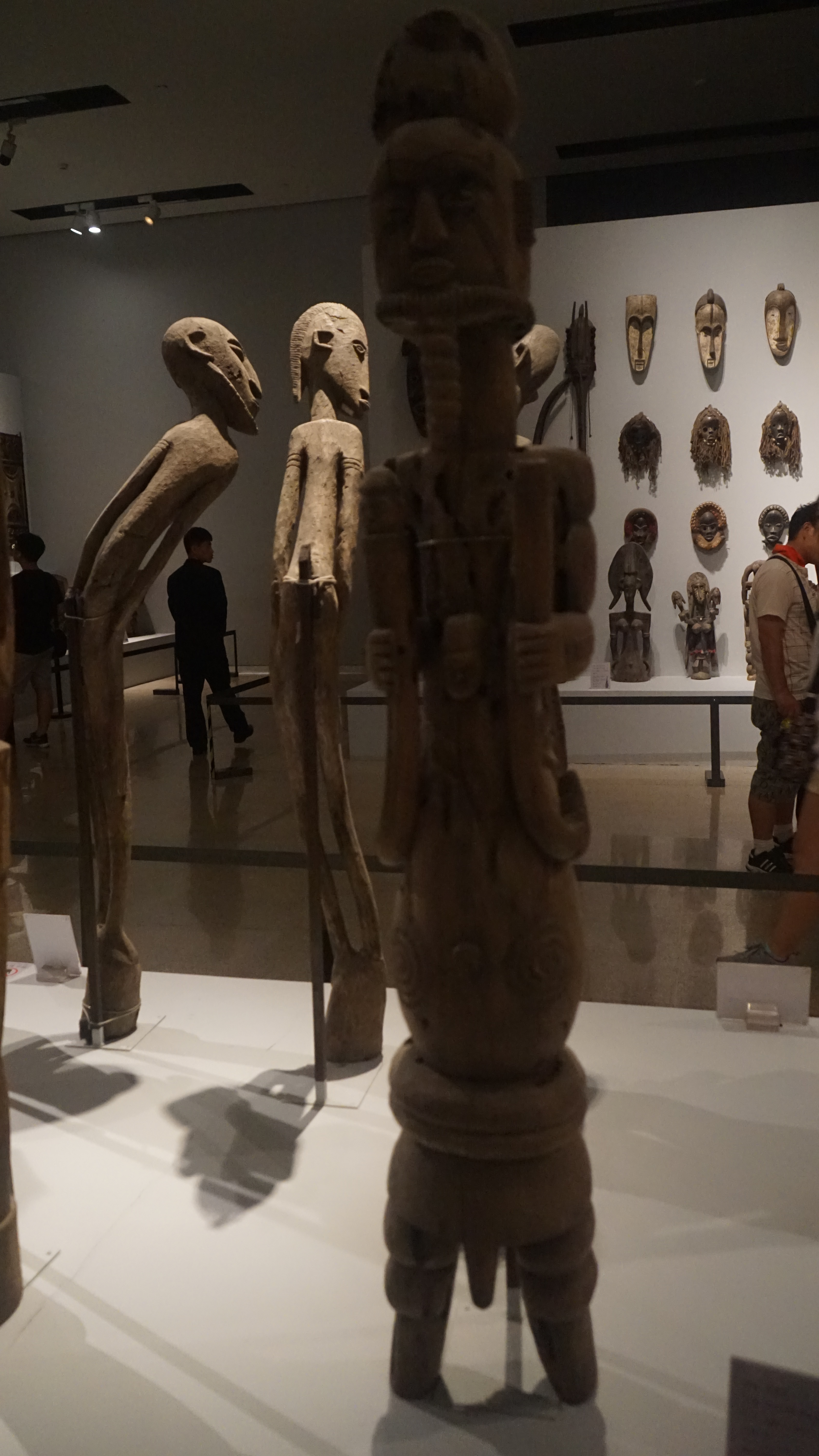
Oron Ancestral figures at the African Museum of China

Ekpu Oro ancestral figures existed as summaries of the personal and social experiences of the Oron people of Southeastern Nigeria - they embodied Oron spiritual beliefs and cultural history; hence, were vessels for the spirits of the dead that instilled great influence over the daily, religious, and social lives of the living. As an art form, Ekpu held the key to understanding Oron past tradition that was largely destroyed by colonial and Christian presence in Oron society. In ancient times it also serves as pictures where individuals uses this craven images to trace their ancestry and family tree down to twenty and above generations.

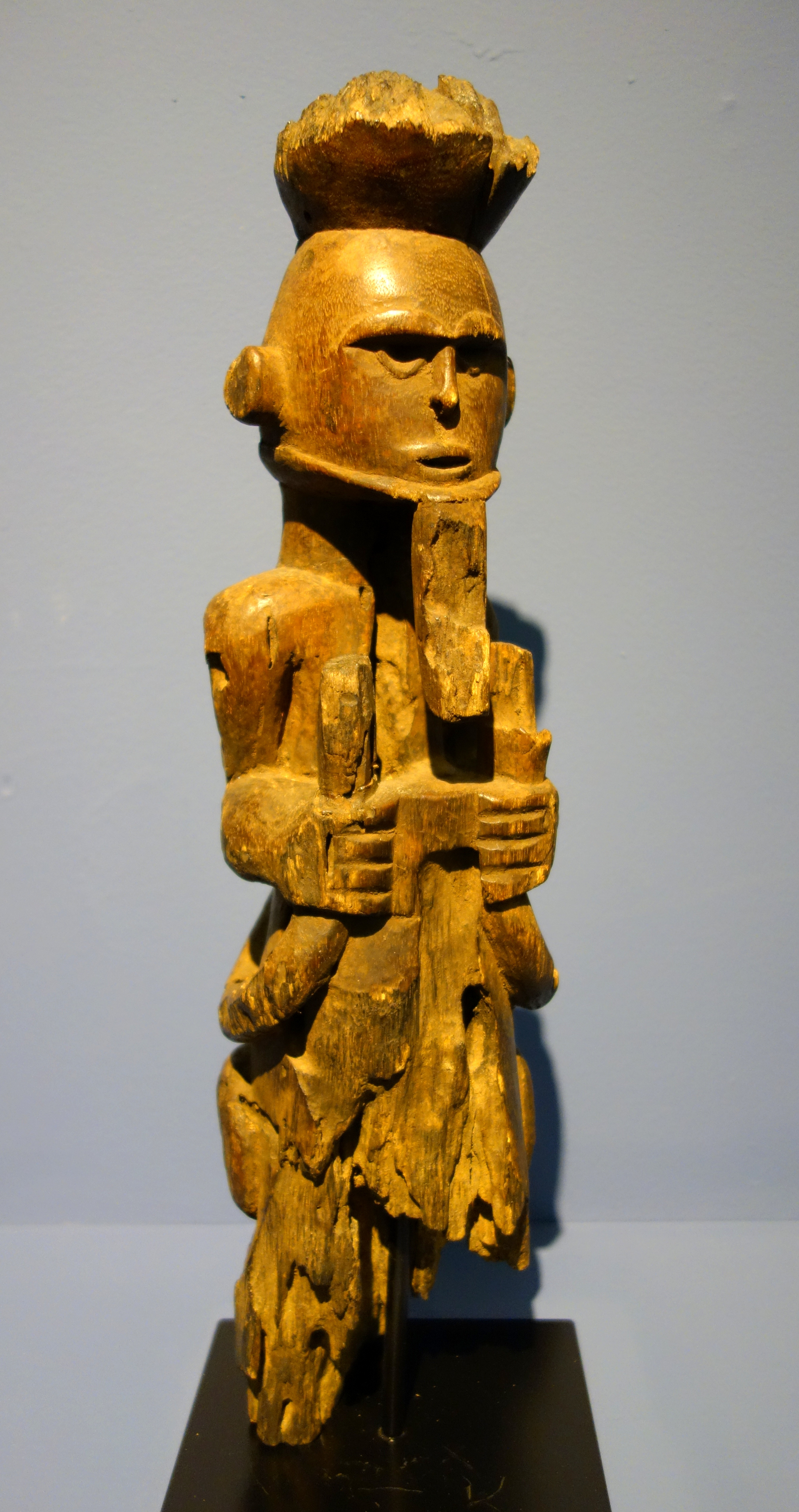
