= Ukwa language =

Efik language of Nigeria

Ukwa
- Native to: Nigeria
- Region: Cross River State
- Native speakers: 350,000 (2023)
- Language family: Niger–Congo?: Atlantic–Congo; Benue–Congo; Cross River; Lower Cross; Ibibio-Efik; Ukwa

Language codes
- ISO 639-3: ukq
- Glottolog: ukwa1238
- ELP: Ukwa

Ukwa is a minor Ibibio-Efik language of Nigeria.
