= Idere language =

Ibibio-Efik language of Nigeria

Idere
- Native to: Nigeria
- Region: Akwa Ibom State
- Native speakers: (5,000 cited 1988)
- Language family: Niger–Congo?: Atlantic–Congo; Benue–Congo; Cross River; Lower Cross; Ibibio-Efik; Idere

Language codes
- ISO 639-3: ide
- Glottolog: ider1238

Idere is an Ibibio-Efik language of Nigeria.
