= Balondo Civilization =

West African people group

Balondo-ba-Konja

Total population
- 7,000

Languages
- Balondo, also known as Londo

Religion
- Creationism with Ovase Loba as supreme deity

Related ethnic groups
- Efut-Balondo, Oro, Congolese.

The Balondo-ba-Konja (pure Balondo) are a central West-African people whose civilization is situated along the southwest maritime coast of Cameroon. Their origins can be traced back to the early civilization along the banks of the Nyanga and Luapula rivers in the modern Democratic Republic of Congo. The local social structure is matriarchal with extended family support. Their language is Londo, part of the Congolese-Efik linguistic group. They practice a creationist religion in which the supreme being and creator is Ovase Loba.

== People ==
The people identify themselves as Balondo or Balondo-ba-Konja, meaning pure Balondo. In their language, one Balondo person is a Morondo. They separate themselves from other ethnic groups by giving them specific names. Bafah Balondo refers to non-Balondo people of the Oroko region, while all others are classified as Bato (people).

Balondo are often also misunderstood as Bantu, Oroko, Balondoba-Nanga, and Balondoba-Diko. Wilhelm Bleek, a German linguist, used the term Bâ-ntu or Bantu, meaning people or humans, to classify and group people with linguistic and cultural similarities in his 1862 publication of A Comparative Grammar of South African Languages. The Balondo are a separate people based on the distinction of their language and ethnic origin compared to other groups included in Bleek's classification of Bantu people. The Balondo are a coastal people, unlike the Oroko who are a hill tribe, whose history can be traced back to Rumpi Hills in Ndian and Kupe Hills in Meme divisions. The people of Balondo do not recognize Balondo ba-Nanga and Balondo ba-Diko as part of their ethnic group because both names were used in stories by a Ngolo fiction writer who had never come into contact with the Balondo people in person.

== Culture ==
The Balondo society comprises families and people living together in a close community structure. It includes parents, grandparents, uncles, aunts, and neighbors. The communities are matriarchal, which means they are matrilineal, and inheritance is traced to the mother's side, which is called Nwana a Timbaka O Mbusa Nyange in their language.

Societal issues are dealt with and arbitrated by a committee of elderly men and women called Batina-ba-Moki. The central chief is usually an elderly man called Muli, who manages the issues of the entire community, while the female chief called Muli-wa-Balana primarily manages women's affairs.

=== New year ===
The traditional version of the Balondo-ba-Konja new year is called Litangua-la-Moki. It is marked by a festival to celebrate Ovase Loba, the supreme being, and Bawu-ba-Balondo, their ancestors. The festival opens with chants, incantations, and praises to God, and the ancestors, Bawu-ba-balondo, followed by invocations and pouring of libations to the ancestors. The purpose of the festival is to cleanse the communities of bad luck and make way for good fortune.

=== Marriage ===
Marriage between a brother and a sister is forbidden in the Balondo homeland. Boluka-wa-Ndabo or House Marriage is the practice of cousin marriages. Marriage normally begins with Manyuke-nyuke. It is when children participate in the role-play of the structure of a family when playing house. The Manyuke-nyuke is followed by the actualization of marriage when the children grow into adults. Prior to the actualization of marriage, Ikumba-Muna takes place. It is the Balondo custom where the groom with his kinsmen visit the house of the bride to meet the parents and announce his intention.

The betrothing process is long and ceremonious. There is a long waiting period, which is the period for the bride-to-be to attain puberty. This practice of child marriage has been abolished. In case both the bride and groom are of the same age, the waiting period is brief.

Nkhuo, or the “fattening room,” is an ancient marriage practice in Balondo society. It is the practice where girls are prepared for womanhood. Girls are taken to the room during puberty, and acceptance in the room is a demonstration of virtue, sexual purity, and proven virginity. While in Nkhuo, girls have to live without their families and are trained by older women of the community. They are given heavy meals to make them gain weight as in ancient times being fat was a sign of prosperity, fertility, and beauty. The Nkhuo period lasts for one month, after which the girl's family would present her to the groom and his family, well-wishers, and the community at large.

Dowry is a way of validating marriage among people of Balondo society. The dowry comprises clothes and food items, but no money. It is a token of the parents’ effort in raising a suitable female child. At the time of betrothal, the child in past child marriages could not influence the dowry process because of her age, but a mature bride-to-be can influence the process even in contemporary times. There are five interrelated stages of Balondo marriages: courting, asking for a girl's consent, working through a middleman, test of bride's character, and paying the bride dowry.

=== Language ===
The Balondo language is called Londo by European linguists. Similar to the linguistic structures of European and American languages, Balondo language contains phonology, morphology, syntax, semantics, and pragmatics. The Balondo language belongs to the Congolese and Efik linguistic groups. The development of the Balondo language has played a critical part in the transition from the historical oral tradition to the modern writing down of important local texts, beliefs and stories, and other social, legal, and political documents and correspondence.

According to the World Classification of Languages Ethnologue, Londo is classified with Bantu, Lundu-Balong, Londo-Bananga, Londo-Badiko, and Oroko-West based on speculation. In Cameroon, it is popularly believed that Londo is linguistically associated with the Oroko dialect. However, the Londo alphabet and language is a different form in principle, fundamental structures, and is a fully developed language compared to most others.

=== Customs ===
The young Balondo-ba-konja boys and girls, usually at the age of five years, have to undergo unique body markings. These marks are generally elaborate body and facial designs. The markings include tiny cuts on both cheeks of boys and girls, which after healing create impressions on the skin.

There are marital customs that the Balondo practice. These are Boluka wa Ndabo, Manyuke-nyuke, Ikumba Muna, and Nkhuo. Bolukawa Ndabo or house marriage is between cousins. Marriage normally begins with Manyuke-nyuke. It is when children partake in role-play of the family structure. Ikumba Muna is a tradition where the groom visits the girl's home to announce his intention in front of her parents. Nkhuo is the fattening room, which is a practice to keep a girl away from her family to prepare her for womanhood.

The Balondo people consider dance as a celebration of life, work, and spirituality. Malle, the Elephant dance, ekpe, the leopard dance, Jokei ewondo ya nwenya, or dancing on live burning coals, owasa njanga, stilt dancer, mondoa ria, dancing up a coconut tree. Other dancing forms include mosembe, amekoko, liyangi, ngomo ya betuli, and rokombe are mostly performed by women.

=== Food ===
The main food dishes in Balondo cuisine includes ekpang berembi, ekpang bolingo, ekpang njoki, ekpang coco, pamachop, and sarara. Fish, snails, eggs, shrimps, boiled yams, coco yams, and plantains are all part of Balondo cuisine. Other food items include mendo or foo-foo of pounded boiled red coco yams, yams, cassava, and befufu (gari or processed cassava flour). Mendo is a collective name for round balls of foo-foo that are eaten with Balondo soups, including otong, erikaikong, ofere afang (erung), ofere oa iyeke (ogbono) fresh fish, mawuni (okro), ofere oa bove, and the mosuku. Animal husbandry is carried out on a small-scale. Goats, pigs, and chickens serve as a source of protein for the Balondo. But the primary source of protein is fish similar to most other coastal cultures.

=== Arts and crafts ===
During the early settlements, pottery, sculpture, jewelry, and body painting were prominent forms of arts in Balondo-ba-Konja society. A significant portion of arts belongs to the decorative art form. Most types of Balondo art have become a thing of the past, but body painting is still prevalent among the people. Body painting shows position and identity in society. Fembe is the practice of using a mixture of crushed white chalk and water to make delicate facial and bodily patterns for girls and women.

== Religion ==
The Balondo-ba-konja religious beliefs are based on the philosophy of creationism. They believe in a supreme deity, Ovase Loba, who created them in a pool of water in the Congo known as Morimo. Ovase Loba is believed to be a by-product of the pre-existing creative matter, and not an alpha and omega. They believe that their god created Balondo-ba-konja and other humans, animals, plants, land, and water in the Morimo.

=== Philosophies ===
Creationism is the Balondo's religious philosophy. It is about how Ovase Loba created the Balondo people in a pool of water in the wilderness of the Congo. Mamoism is about the consciousness of people of the Balondo-ba-Konja. It is the need to be born and die a Morondo Kpaa, regardless of external influences. Mephism is a philosophy put forward by the second son of Mesembe Oro. It is about how the Balondo society should be revamped without hurting its cultural norms or devaluing its people.

== Geography ==
=== Location ===
The Balondo live in fifteen settlements in the South-west coastal region of Cameroon. The landscape comprises coastal mangrove swamps to the north-west of Mount Cameroon, forest reserves of the Mokoko River and Meme River in Ekondo-Titi subdivision, and two major palm plantations in Upper Balondo (Ekondo-Etiti subdivision) and Lower Balondo (Bamuso subdivision). Each town has access to rivers, beaches, estuaries leading to Ndongore or the Atlantic Ocean.

=== Neighbors ===
They have Cameroonian and Nigerian neighbors on all sides. The Oroko of Ngolo, Baima, and Batanga live to the north. Bakolle and Betika live to the south and southwest. Isangele and Rio-del-Rey live to the west. The Barombi and the Oroko of Balue, Ngbandi (Mbonge) and Ekombe live to the east. The people of Bomboko, Bimbia, and Bakweri live to the southeast. The Nigerian neighbors are the Calabar people and Efu-Balondo, ethnic relatives of the Balondo, who live to the east of the Cross River Delta.

=== Climate ===
The settled Balondo region experiences equatorial climate due to its latitudinal positioning between 4.23 and 4.50 degrees North. They experience two distinct seasons, called Nayo (dry) and Nikukeh (rainy). The seasons are impacted by the north-west trade winds and south-west monsoon winds.

The weather remains hot and humid throughout the year, with high temperatures. There are light rains in the dry season that start in October and end in March; however, the rain is preceded by temperatures ranging from 20-35 degrees Celsius. During the rainy season, the average rainfall can amount to about 100 inches each year.

== Economy ==
Most of the Balondo people are farmers and fishermen. They mostly cultivate cocoa yams or bvende, or beyo, vegetables including mawuni okro. Commercial fishing is common among the people of Balondo. The fishermen sail to fishing ports in dug-out canoes to exchange food crops and other items of necessity for smoked fish. This practice is known as Beyunga. Night fishing, Iyobi, Ebu fishing, and Maroki fishing are other non-commercial forms of fishing meant for home consumption. Their economy is now transitioning from self-sufficiency to dependency because of palm oil and cocoa cash crop cultivation.

== History ==
Balondo-ba-konja people originated in the area of modern-day Democratic Republic of Congo. In early 1100s, fifteen Balondo principalities and their nominal rulers migrated from the shores of either the Nyanga River or Luapula River to the town of Akwa Akpa, a coastal town along the banks of Cross River known as Calabar today. After settling down, the place was named “Ideh,” their name for present-day Calabar. The Efik people of Calabar called them Efut or strangers in their local language. This event of migration is known as the “first voyage.” The Mouri-Monene, Balondo King, worked closely with the Muli or chiefs in-charge of all fifteen principalities to plan their strategy. The King prepared the people and instructed people to stock food and other supplies.

The "second voyage" in the year 1149 was forced due to the presence of predatory aquatic animals, including crocodiles and sharks. These animals searched for food in the Cross River, and Balondo was losing its people. They were a constant threat. Despite fighting these animals with spears, harpoons, traps, and fishing nets, the situation did not come under their control. It forced them to look for another location for settlement. Scouts were prepared and sent to search for a new homeland. These scouts traveled to the present day southwest coast of Cameroon, including the Bakassi peninsula. The scouts shared the news with the people, but a mutual consensus could not be reached. The king discouraged the migration, but the pro-migration Balondo refused and safely relocated to the maritime location they discovered in Cameroon. The Balondo who decided to stay in the original Balondo settlement in South Calabar are known today as Efut-Balondo.

=== Wars ===
In the 1700s, the Balondo were facing threats to the ownership of their lands. These threats were internal and external aggression. The quarrel between Nambuli and Nanguia, two brothers, set the grounds for the first war over the ownership of the land. After irreconcilable differences, Nambuli relocated to a new settlement, which he named Ekondo-Etiti or the small universe. Before leaving, he told Nanguia that he could keep Ekondo-Enene or the greater world. The Lobe people did not approve of Nambuli's relocation there as they believed it was a violation of the “Non-Interference Act.” The Lobe people asked Nambuli to leave, which he refused causing the onset of the first war with Lobe. Nambuli was victorious. He forced the Lobe people to give up more land as a war indemnity.

In 1725, the Lobe declared war on Kumbe over the “Ise Nde,” a very fertile piece of farmland in Kumbe. People of Kumbe fought and recaptured the land and pushed Lobe back to their side of the stream. Kumbe raided Lobe again and confiscated Lobe's gigantic wooden gong. After these victories, they were given the title of “Machia Maliba”, or people who regarded blood the same as water.

When these internal threats were addressed, the Balondo nation found itself trapped in external aggression from Itoki (Bakundu), Bamusso (Bakolle), and the Germans. All principalities of the Balondo set aside their differences to fight these external threats. In the 1800s, Nambuli and the Ekondo-Enene fighters defeated the Itoki. In 1820, the threat from the Bakolle people was crushed by the King of Boa and his fighters. Balondo people as a whole were allegedly defeated by the Germans in the 1880s, and they lost most of their land to them. The Germans used the land for plantations, consisting largely of bananas, rubber, and palms. The Balondo refused to work in the plantations, so the Germans used Ngolo, Balue, Ngbandi, Bakundu, and Ekombe people who now belong to the Oroko group formed in Kumba in 1973.
