= Eki language =

Ibibio-Efik language of Nigeria

Eki
- Native to: Nigeria
- Region: Akwa Ibom State
- Native speakers: (5,000 cited 1992)
- Language family: Niger–Congo?: Atlantic–Congo; Benue–Congo; Cross River; Lower Cross; Ibibio-Efik; Eki

Language codes
- ISO 639-3: eki
- Glottolog: ekii1241

Eki is an Ibibio-Efik language of Nigeria.
