= Bamuso =

Coordinates: 4°28′N 8°54′E

- Commune and town
- Interactive map of Bamuso
- Country: Cameroon
- Time zone: UTC+1 (WAT)

Bamuso is a town and commune in Cameroon.

== See also ==
- Communes of Cameroon
