= Okobo language =

Lower Cross River language of Nigeria

Okobo
- Native to: Nigeria
- Region: Akwa Ibom State
- Native speakers: (50,000 cited 1991)
- Language family: Niger–Congo?: Atlantic–Congo; Benue–Congo; Cross River; Lower Cross; Okobo

Language codes
- ISO 639-3: okb
- Glottolog: okob1241
- ELP: Okobo

Okobo is a Lower Cross River language of Nigeria.
