= Ibaka Town =

Ibaka Town Ibãká Oro
- Town
- Location in Nigeria
- Coordinates: 4°39′00″N 8°18′22″E
- Country: Nigeria
- State: Akwa Ibom
- Local Government Area: Mbo, Akwa Ibom

Ibaka Town is a commercial town of the Oron people and located in Mbo local government area of Akwa Ibom state in Nigeria.

== Ibaka Deep Sea Port ==
Akwa Ibom Integrated Deep Sea Port is located in the coastal town of Ibaka in Mbo Local Government Area of Akwa Ibom State. The project was originally known as the Ibaka Deep Seaport, reflecting its association with Ibaka in Mbo Local Government Area. In 2021, the Akwa Ibom State Government officially adopted the name Ibom Deep Seaport as part of a broader rebranding of state-owned projects and institutions. According to the state government, the change was intended to align the project with the "Ibom" brand used for other state assets and was not intended to alter the project's ownership or host communities. The renaming generated controversy among some stakeholders in the Oron area, who associated it with concerns over the project's proposed location. In January 2026, the Akwa Ibom State Government signed a memorandum of understanding with Interaf Group Consortium to advance the Ibom Deep Seaport project and related industrial infrastructure. In April 2026, Governor Umo Eno received the project's feasibility report and reiterated the state's commitment to its implementation. In May 2026, the Federal Government announced that the Ibom Deep Seaport was among five proposed deep seaport projects that had completed the required approvals and compliance processes for investment and implementation.
