= Ebughu language =

Lower Cross River language of Nigeria

Ebughu
- Native to: Nigeria
- Region: Akwa Ibom State
- Native speakers: (5,000 cited 1988)
- Language family: Niger–Congo?: Atlantic–Congo; Benue–Congo; Cross River; Lower Cross; Ebughu

Language codes
- ISO 639-3: ebg
- Glottolog: ebug1241
- ELP: Ebughu

Ebughu is a Lower Cross River language of Nigeria.
