= Enwang-Uda language =

Lower Cross River language of Nigeria

Enwang-Uda
- Enwan-Uda
- Native to: Nigeria
- Region: Akwa Ibom State
- Native speakers: (25,000 cited 1988–1998)
- Language family: Niger–Congo?: Atlantic–Congo; Benue–Congo; Cross River; Lower Cross; Enwang-Uda

Language codes
- ISO 639-3: Either: enw – Enwan uda – Uda
- Glottolog: enwa1244
- ELP: Enwan

Enwang (Enwan) and Uda are a Lower Cross River language of Nigeria. The two varieties are quite distinct.

Uda was the subject of a month-long intensive field methods course through CoLang (the Institute on Collaborative Language Research) in 2012 at the University of Kansas. The course relied on two native speakers from Nigeria.
