= Ilue language =

Lower Cross River language of Nigeria

Ilue
- Native to: Nigeria
- Region: Akwa Ibom State
- Native speakers: (5,000 cited 1988)
- Language family: Niger–Congo?: Atlantic–Congo; Benue–Congo; Cross River; Lower Cross; Ilue

Language codes
- ISO 639-3: ilv
- Glottolog: ilue1241
- ELP: Ilue

Ilue is a Lower Cross River language of Nigeria. Another name for Ilue is Idua.
