= Oro language =

Lower Cross River language of Nigeria

Nsíŋ Oro
- Native to: Nigeria
- Region: Akwa Ibom State
- Native speakers: (75,000 cited 1989)
- Language family: Niger–Congo?: Atlantic–Congo; Benue–Congo; Cross River; Lower Cross; Nsíŋ Oro

Language codes
- ISO 639-3: orx
- Glottolog: oroo1241

Oro (Oron) is a Lower Cross River language of Nigeria. The phonemes of Oron comprise seven oral vowels í, ε, e, a, o, ɔ, u, five plosive consonants b, kp, d, t, k, three nasal consonants m, ŋ, n, three fricative consonants f, s, h, two semi-vowel consonants w, y and one lateral consonant l. The lateral consonant is an unusual feature of Oro and it is not found in most neighbouring varieties.

The Oron language does not possess any affixes or verb forms to express passive actions; 'he is received' becomes 'they receive him'. Finally, it may be noted that the relative order of the simple Oron sentence is subject-verb-object.
