= Afaha Ukwa =

Village in Akwa Ibom State, Nigeria

Coordinates: 4°38′12″N 7°56′23″E

Afaha Ukwa is a village in Eket local government area of Akwa Ibom. It is surrounded by Ata Idung Afaha Ekid, Atai Ndon-Afaha Ekid, Ebana and Ede Urua.

Their language is the Ekid Language.

Afaha Ukwa is one of the host community to Exxon Mobil Airstrip and Technical Training College, an Apex manpower training provider for Mobil producing Nigeria.

Prominent family clans include Nnug Akpe Obong embracing Atang, Nsien, Nsetuk, Ebitu and Edward family; also the Asong Odiong family and the Afaha Akpong family are the origins of this peaceful land.

Afaha Ukwa is predominantly a Christian Pentecostal community with host of big name churches like The Church of Jesus Christ of Latter Day Saints at SDP road. The Apostolic Church Afaha Ukwa, Qua Iboe Church Obok Idim Methodist church, Faith and Works Mount Zion church, Assemblies Of God, and St. Fabian Catholic Church.

Also there are hotels and resorts for recreational purposes the likes of Grandville Hotel, Olympus House, Imperial Hotel, Treasure Guest House, and Airstrip Hotel Ydofia Street.

Afaha Uqua community is largely a farming and artisan community.

The present Traditional ruler of Afaha Ukwa is a Medical Practitioner Dr. Okon Nsien 2015 who took over from the late Dr. Sunday Afaha. Ruling Families in Afaha Uqua are the Atang, Afaha, and Nssien family.

== See also ==
- Afaha Atai
- Ede Urua
