= Eket =

Local government area and town in Nigeria

Eket Ekid
- City and LGA
- Interactive map of Eket
- Location within Nigeria
- Coordinates: 4°39′N 7°56′E
- Country: Nigeria
- State: Akwa Ibom State

Government
  - Chairman: Hon Akaninyene Tommey Ikott

Area
  - City and LGA: 209.7 km^{2} (81.0 sq mi)
  - Metro: 214 km^{2} (83 sq mi)

Population (2022)
  - City and LGA: 220,600
  - Density: 1,052/km^{2} (2,725/sq mi)
- Time zone: UTC+1 (WAT)
- Vehicle registration: KET
- Climate: Am

Eket (audio) is a city and one of the 31 local government areas in Akwa Ibom State, Nigeria. The name Eket or Ekid also refers to the indigenous people of the two Local Government Areas of Eket and Esit Eket who are a stock of the Ibibio people of the southern part of Ibibioland and to their dialect which is Ekid. The Eket people use the endonym Ekid for themselves and their language, but Europeans spell and pronounce the name as "Eket". The Eket in Ibibioland has no relationship with Eket in Sweden.

Apart from being a local government area in Akwa Ibom State, Eket is one of the three geopolitical zones in the state. The geopolitical zones are Uyo senatorial district, Ikot Ekpene senatorial district and Eket senatorial district.

The town itself is an industrial city that in recent years has become a conurbation joining together separate villages. The Office of the Surveyor-General of Akwa Ibom State estimates the area of the Eket Local Government Area to be approximately 176.000 square Km while the 2006 National Census gives the population of the Local Government Area as 172,856. However, the Akwa Ibom State Ministry of Economic Development gives the 2013 estimated population of the Eket Local Government Area as given as 218,438 with a population density of 1,241/km^{2}.

== Major landmarks ==
A major landmark in the town is the Kwa Ibo River, also spelt "Qua Iboe River" which in some places frames the boundary between Eket and Onna Local Government Areas and empties into the Atlantic Ocean. Contrary to popular belief, Akwa Ibom State is not named after Qua Iboe River. The name of the State has to do with "Ibom", the ancient settlement of Ibibio people before they migrated to their current locations.

In the absence of roads, Qua Iboe River was the major means of transportation from the Atlantic coast to the hinterlands. It facilitated trade and political administration in the pre-colonial and colonial periods, hence the first effort at Christian evangelization in the area was named Qua Iboe Mission and the political district was named Qua Iboe District.

Other landmarks are the Warri-Patani-Port-Harcourt-Ikot Abasi-Eket-Oron Road which forms part of the 676 Km (338 x 2) East-West Road from Warri in Delta State to Port Harcourt in Rivers State, to Ikot Abasi, Eket and Oron in Akwa Ibom State in the South-South Region of the country; Esuene Square; Mobil's Qua Iboe Terminal; Mobil Airstrip which was built in the 1970's; Qua Iboe Bridge on the East-West Road; and the Eket Sports Stadium. Part of the Stubb Creek Forest Reserve declared by the Colonial Government in 1930 is located within Eket Local Government Area.

== History ==
Eket people belong to the Ibibio ethnic group of Akwa Ibom State who are said to be "the stock natives from whom most of the small tribes in the Qua Iboe and Calabar have sprung". Prof M.D.W. Jeffreys thought that the Phoenicians and Hanno, a Carthaginian explorer, both of whom sailed past the West African coast about 600 BC and 450 BC, respectively, must have met the Ibibios on the coast. The Ekid, an Ibibio people, have lived on the Atlantic coast from time immemorial. Jeffreys' thesis takes on more significance given that reference to Hanno's sea voyage down the coast of West African in the 5th century is referenced under the entry "Hanno: Carthaginian explorer" in the World History Encyclopaedia which also mentions other notable ancient historians who have written about Hanno's sea journeys, e.g. the Ancient Roman historian Justin, the Greek historian Herodotus, the Roman, Pliny the Elder, etc. The account of Hanno's exploration of the coasts of West Africa also mentions encounters with short hairy people thought to have been pigmies who also feature eminently in Ekid oral history which refers to them as "Nnung Amama Isim". Hano also mentioned the sighting of scary fires on a high mountain which some scholars believe must have been volcanic eruptions on Mount Cameroons. When Portuguese explorers arrived on the coast of West Africa in the late 1400s and got to Calabar, Oron, Eket and other settlements on the Atlantic Coast with which they traded, Eket people were already well settled in their current location. The Portuguese named the major river in the area "Rio de Conde" i.e. the Count's River. Later the British traders and colonisers renamed the river Kwa Ibo River (also spelled Qua Iboe), a mispronunciation and misspelling of Akwa Obio, the old name of the community at the mouth of the river. Up till today, Eket people still remember the Portuguese whom they call "Akpotoki". Next came the Dutch, the British, the French, and the Germans. It is the British who finally colonized the area now known as Nigeria of which Eket is a Local Government Area.

Some ideas about the history of the Eket people before the colonial era can be gleaned from the oral histories of the different Ekid clans which have been documented by Prof. M.D.W. Jeffreys (a colonial administrator, anthropologist and an academic who served as Assistant District Officer, ADO, of Eket District from 1919) in his Report on the Clans and Tribes of Eket District 1925 (National Archives, Enugu). According to the 1956 Jones Report, Eket people acknowledged themselves as belonging to 11 clans. Although the report did not mention the names of these 11 clans, they are Afaha (the largest clan), Etebi, Abighe, Idua, Ibeye, Uda, Aniogh, Abikpi, Nnama, Assang and Akiki. Of these 11 clans only Afaha and Idua clans have been recognized as such by the Akwa Ibom State Government while the other 9 clans have been grouped into one recognized clan – Ekid Offiong. Thus we have three recognized Ekid clans, namely Ekid Afaha, Ekid Offiong and Idua clans. The fourth clan in the Eket Local Government Area is the Okon clan. These different clans of Eket people have oral histories explaining their origin and migration to their present locations. Common among the oral histories of migration of Eket Afaha and Ekid Offiong clans is the fact that they migrated from Usak Edet (Isangele) in the present-day Cameroon through various routes to their current locations. The Idua people claim they migrated from the Cameroons to Calabar through the Northern Cross River before crossing to Esit Eket, Eket, Oniong Nung Ndem Awa (Onna) and Oron on the mainland. These oral histories seem to confirm the position of several historians such as Abasiattai (1988) and Edet Udoh (1983) that Eket and Oron people migrated through a seaward route from the Cameroons to their current locations.

Although King Jaja's commercial and political adventures in the Qua Iboe area which impacted the Ekid people have been documented in colonial records, including the 1881 Jaja-Ibeno War it seems the one singular event which brought Eket into history was the signing of the Treaty of friendship and protection between the "King" and Chiefs of Eket, Qua Iboe River and the representatives of Queen Victoria of the United Kingdom of Britain, Ireland, India, etc. at Eket Beach, Atabong ("Esok Akungkpung" or "Esok Afia Anwe") on 8 September 1884. The signatories for Eket were given as Ackpun, Userturo, Uko, Ito and Esiet while R.W. Craigie, commander of Her Majesty's Ship "Flirt" signed for Consul E.H. Hewett, Esq). "Ackpun" was a misspelling of "Akpan", that is, Akpan Udoimuk of Nung Akpan in Atabong Village while "Userturo" was a misspelling of "Uso Etukudo" (Uso Etukudo was of Nung Uso Ekon in Usung Inyang village). The signatories for Eket were village/family heads of the surrounding villages of Atabong and Usung Inyang. The British trader, George Watts, signed as a witness. On the same day, similar treaties were signed between the British officials and the "King" and Chiefs of Ibeno at Ibeno Beach and the "King" and Chiefs of Okut (Okat) at Okat Beach. These treaties were part of the treaty drive mounted by the British in preparation for the 1884/1885 Berlin Conference. With the treaties, the British were able to convince the other European powers that these territories were firmly under their control.

The next major historical event was the arrival of the Rev. Samuel Bill at Ibeno in December 1887 at the request of Ibeno chiefs to establish a Christian Mission in the area in order to discourage the territorial and commercial ambittions of Jaja in the Qua Iboe area. Through the establishment of the Qua Iboe Mission, Christianity and western education were brought to Ibeno, Eket, Etinan and from there Christianity and education spread to other parts of Ibibio and Ibo lands and beyond.

Next came the establishment of the Qua Iboe District in 1894 with Alfred Ashmall Whitehouse as the first Vice Consul at Eket. The district was part of the Oil Rivers Protectorate declared on June 5, 1885 after the conclusion of the Berlin Conference. This Protectorate was expanded and renamed the Niger Coast Protectorate on May 12, 1893, with Sir Claude MacDonald as its first commissioner. The Qua Iboe District comprised what is today most parts of Akwa Ibom State, including Esit Eket, Onna, Ibeno, Nsit Ubium, Etinan, Abak, Etim Ekpo, Oron, Mbo, Okobo, Urue Offong/Oruko, Udung Uko, Okobo etc. between 1893 and 1899. In 1905 Eket became a district comprising present Eket, Esit Eket, Ibeno, Onna, Oron, Mbo, Urue Offong/Oruko, Udung Uko, Okobo and part of Nsit Ubium Local Government Areas. In 1922, by Government Notice No. 71 of 3 August 1922 (NC-M 135), Eket Division was created out of Calabar Division, with its headquarters at Eket. Eket Division continued to be administered as a Division under Calabar Province until the 1950s when Eket Division came under Uyo Province in the Eastern Region.

In the mid-1950s Mr Keith Arrowsmith was the Divisional Officer (DO) for Eket. In his 1991 book Bush Paths he reported on a conversation he had with the then Premier of Eastern Region, Dr Nnamdi Azikiwe, who informed him that the first trial of county council elections in the Eastern Region of Nigeria would be conducted in Eket in 1955.

At the creation of the defunct South Eastern State on May 27, 1967, Eket became one of the 10 Divisions of the new State before additional Divisions were created in August 1970. In the 1970 exercise, Oron Division was created while Nsit Ubim was included in the new Etinan Division. Both areas were formerly under Eket Division. Under the 1976 Local Government Reforms carried out by the Federal Government of Nigeria, Eket Division became one of the 301 Local Government Areas in the country.

During the Second Republic (October 1, 1979 – December 31, 1983), the various State Governments embarked on the creation of new local government areas. In the then Cross River State, the Government of Dr Clement Isong split Eket Local Government into five Local Government Areas, namely Eket, Uquo, Ibeno/Edor, Onnion Nung Ndem and Awa/Ikot Akpan Ntembom Local Government Areas. With the military take-over of the Federal Government of Nigeria on December 31, 1983, the newly created local government areas were abolished and Eket Local Government Area returned to what it was in 1976. The Military Government of Generals Ibrahim Babangida and Sanni Abacha created new local government areas in 1989, 1991 and 1996 and Eket was again split into Eket, Onna, Esit Eket and Ibeno Local Government Areas.

== Climate ==
Eket experiences tropical weather conditions. In Eket, there is heavy rainfall every year. The Köppen and Geiger classification for this climate is Af. According to the information available, the mean annual temperature recorded in Eket is 25.9 °C or 78.6 °F. Every year, there is about 3675 mm or 144.7 in of rainfall. Eket has a mild climate, and summers are difficult to pin down. January, February, March, April, May, November, and December are the ideal months to travel.

Climate data for Eket (1991–2020)
Month	Jan	Feb	Mar	Apr	May	Jun	Jul	Aug	Sep	Oct	Nov	Dec	Year
Record high °C (°F)	37 (99)	38 (100)	38 (100)	36 (97)	36 (97)	33 (91)	33 (91)	32 (90)	33 (91)	34 (93)	34 (93)	36 (97)	38.0 (100.4)
Mean daily maximum °C (°F)	30.7 (87.3)	31.4 (88.5)	31.0 (87.8)	30.9 (87.6)	30.3 (86.5)	28.9 (84.0)	27.6 (81.7)	27.3 (81.1)	27.7 (81.9)	28.6 (83.5)	29.6 (85.3)	30.4 (86.7)	29.5 (85.1)
Daily mean °C (°F)	27.0 (80.6)	27.8 (82.0)	27.7 (81.9)	27.6 (81.7)	27.1 (80.8)	26.1 (79.0)	25.3 (77.5)	25.0 (77.0)	25.3 (77.5)	25.8 (78.4)	26.5 (79.7)	26.8 (80.2)	26.5 (79.7)
Mean daily minimum °C (°F)	23.2 (73.8)	24.2 (75.6)	24.5 (76.1)	24.3 (75.7)	23.9 (75.0)	23.2 (73.8)	22.9 (73.2)	22.8 (73.0)	22.9 (73.2)	23.0 (73.4)	23.4 (74.1)	23.3 (73.9)	23.5 (74.3)
Record low °C (°F)	15 (59)	16.5 (61.7)	16 (61)	18 (64)	16.5 (61.7)	16.3 (61.3)	16.5 (61.7)	15.6 (60.1)	15.8 (60.4)	15 (59)	15.2 (59.4)	9.7 (49.5)	9.7 (49.5)
Average precipitation mm (inches)	40.2 (1.58)	76.2 (3.00)	167.0 (6.57)	249.3 (9.81)	343.7 (13.53)	541.9 (21.33)	550.5 (21.67)	523.9 (20.63)	459.4 (18.09)	362.2 (14.26)	210.4 (8.28)	60.4 (2.38)	3,585.3 (141.15)
Average precipitation days (≥ 1.0 mm)	3.7	5.1	12.8	14.8	19.0	22.1	24.0	23.7	22.5	20.6	13.2	4.0	185.4
Average relative humidity (%)	76.4	79.2	83.0	84.3	85.1	85.9	86.1	86.9	88.0	87.6	85.3	77.9	83.8
Source: NOAA

== Economy ==
The abundant rivers, creeks and streams and the lush vegetation provide an enabling environment for crop, fish and animal farming. For example, cassava, various species of yams and cocoyams, vegetables, plantains, bananas, tilapia and snail farming are common. The traditional occupations of the Eket people are therefore subsistence farming, hunting, fishing and trading. However, over-farming and poor farming practices have the effect of depleting soil nutrients on many farms and plots.

Between 1928 and 1941, Prince Peter Eket Inyang Udoh who had lived in the UK and USA for 17 years, tried to garner support from local farmers in Eket and other Ibibio Areas to export palm produce to the US, working under the aegis of the Ibibio Trading Corporation which he had set up. Peter Eket Inyangudoh's ITC is not to be confused with Chief Nyong Essien's ITC. Both were competitors. While Inyangudoh's ITC-Eket concentrated on Eket market, Chief Nyong Essien's ITC-Uyo harnessed the market in Uyo and environs. Due to many factors which included the poor organizational structure of the venture, suspicion by the British and American authorities, unrealistic targets set by the venturer and his American partners, adverse economic and political conditions in the period leading to World War II, the venture failed and Peter Eket Inyang Udoh was unfairly labeled a fraudster. His subsequent efforts to revive the venture after the War also failed. An oil mill was established at Ikot Abia in Okon, Eket but it also went into disuse during the civil war. It is recognized that Prince Eket Inyangudoh's initiative was a bold one.

According to Udoma, there was also Ibibio Farmers Association which was also promoted by Prince Peter Eket Inyangudoh and Mohammed Uwemedimo. The Association was inaugurated in 1939 with the aim of exporting farm produce direct to the US, thereby by-passing the foreign traders. Udoma reports that soon after the initial shipment, the Association ran into problems and was unable to continue with exports. Instead in 1948 it applied for and obtained a licence as a local buying agent selling produce to British middlemen and other traders.

In 1961, the Eastern Nigeria Development Corporation (ENDC) established two oil palm plantations in Eket - one at Esit Urua and another at Etebi (now in Esit Eket) as part of its agricultural and rural development policies. By 1963 total acreage acquired was 8,965 acres while area planted was 85 acres. These plantations were abandoned during the Nigerian Civil War. However, while the Etebi oil plantation has now been reactivated by the Akwa Ibom State Government, the oil palm plantation at Esit Urua (Inwang Abidiba) has not.

With the creation of states on May 27, 1967, and the commencement of Mobil operations between 1969 and 1970 which resulted in an increased population in Eket, a lot of people are engaged in construction and service industries, e.g. catering and hotels management, transportation, telecommunications, merchandising (supermarkets), teaching, civil service, the professions, etc.

When Mobil Producing Nigeria started its operations in the then South Eastern State soon after the civil war, the location of Eket Local Government gave the town the advantage of being the hub of Mobil Producing Nigeria operations. Consequently, several companies providing services to Mobil were established in Eket. The Mobil Airstrip, Management Housing Estate/Mobil Guest House, Mobil Pegasus School and Mobil Technical Training Centre are located in Eket while the Qua Iboe Terminal is located at Ibeno, about 15 minutes from Eket by road. Qua River Hotels was also established by the State Government although it has now been closed down. In the late 1970s and early 1980s, there were the Seastate Seafoods Ltd, Qua Steel Products Ltd and Dr Pepper Bottling Company, all of which are now closed down. These business undertakings helped greatly to expand the economy of Eket. A private oil refinery, Amakpe International Refinery, was to be sited on the outskirts of the city along the Oron road but it has yet to materialize.

The town has a stadium as well as other infrastructure of importance, e.g. a network of tarred roads including the East-West Federal Highway which passes through the town, Eket-Etinan Road, Eket-QIT Road, Eket-Jamestown Road, a telecommunications exchange, a public power transmission network, public waterworks, public and private motor parks, two urban markets (Urua Nka and Fionetok market), an abattoir, etc. It also has several eateries, supermarkets, hotels and businesses.

Many of the internal roads and drainage systems in the town were constructed or rehabilitated by Mobil Producing Nigeria under its Community Development program. However, with the advent of NDDC the company was compelled by law to contribute to the funding of the Niger Delta Development Commission (NDDC) thereby curtailing its community development efforts. The State Government has embarked on a major drainage project along Atabong Road and is in the process of upgrading infrastructure in the town with the rehabilitation of major roads including Atabong Road, Eket-QIT Road, Idua Road, etc., the rehabilitation of the Stadium and Urua Nka, and the construction of housing estates. Eket is a cosmopolitan town with several gated estates, including Usua Amanam Estate, Ikot Ibiok; Esa Akpan Estate, Atabong; Uwa Estate, Ikot Ibiok and Stevegrad Estate, RCC Road. There is a Federal Low-Cost Housing Estate at Mkpok and State Low-Cost Housing Estates at Ikot Udoma and Okon.

The banking business thrives in Eket due to the increased economic activities in the town. Currently, First Bank, UBA, Union Bank, FCMB, Ecobank, Fidelity Bank, etc. operate in Eket. There are three main markets in the town, namely, Urua Nka, Fiongetok Market and Udoinyang Market. In recent times, a thriving foodstuff market has been established along Marina Road where agricultural products from the Northern part of the country are sold. There is also a standard abattoir at Ikot Ebok village. Eket also has a Motherless Babies home at Idong Iniang, Eket.

In the 1990s, western environmentalists were concerned over the activities of oil exploitation in and around Eket, such as Shell and Mobil. The area is now newly "oil-rich" and Eket is the thriving hub of a new oil and gas business, with more than 250 companies providing support services such as catering, flights, and exports. However, this success has caused problems, especially a reluctance by local young men to engage in traditional work such as fishing and farming. There are vocal local campaigns to increase the percentage of oil revenue that is given to the local community.

== People ==
The Eket or Ekid are the people who live in this Local Government Area. They are a sub-group of the Ibibio people. Eket is also the name of the main sub-language that they speak, a Benue–Congo language. Both languages are similar, but sufficiently distinct to give away the precise district the speaker originates from.

The Eket have a form of caste or class society, with the "Amama" being the highest caste, and these are notable for undertaking traditional potlatch-like feasts in which the poorer people are fed en masse. In addition to the Amama, groups of "Ekpenim Isong" (Ekpo Ndem Isong in Ibibio) class rule individual villages and towns, and their will is enforced by the "Ikan" class (traditional masked police) to which entry is by merit rather than birth.

Common surnames include Odungide, Akanimo, Assam, Inwang, Essiet, Udoito, Edoho, Edohoeket, Etukudo, Ukpong, Ekpo, Ikott, Abasekong, Asamudo, Nyoho, Ekong, Ekanim, Udofa, Edem, Inyang, Itauma, Udosen, Usoro, Etti, Etteh (actually meaning father), Udofia, Ukoetuk, Uku, Abia and Nsien. Just like the remainder of West Africa, the family name normally is an indicator of which specific region one is from.

== Education ==
Due to the advent of Christianity in Eket towards the end of the 19th century and the activities of European traders, Western education came to Eket early through the efforts of Qua Iboe Mission which had been established at Ibeno, a suburb of Eket in 1987. The Mission established what came to be known as primary schools in its area of activities, principally to teach the rudiments of reading, writing, arithmetic and religion to its converts. However, the first government-owned school in the area was Government School, Hospital Road, Eket which was established in 1906. According to Chief J.B. Adiakpan, the Grace Bill Institute, Afaha Eket was set up in 1916 by Miss Ema Bill daughter of the Rev. Samuel Bill as a Home for the training of girls. It became Grace Bill Memorial Institute after the death of Mrs Grace Bill and finally Grace Bill Institute. It was approved by the government in 1931. The institute later became the Qua Iboe Church Teacher Training College, Afaha Eket before the civil war. However, although Qua Iboe Church set up several primary schools in the area for the training of teachers and clerks, secondary schools were not established in Eket until the 1960s. Eket people had to send their children to secondary schools outside Eket, e.g. Etinan Institute, Etinan, Methodist Boys' High School, Oron, Hope Wadell Training Institution, Calabar, St Patrick's College, Calabar, Ibibio State College, Ikot Ekpene or to schools outside Calabar Province. The first secondary schools to be established in Eket were St Francis Secondary School, Ikot Ataku/Ikot Akpandem established by the Catholic Church in 1962 and Edoho Memorial Grammar School, Ikot Usoekong founded in 1962 by the late Chief D.J. Edoho, commissioner for Uyo Province. After the liberation of Eket by the Nigerian Federal Forces in 1968 the QIC TTC, Afaha Eket was moved to QIC TTC, Ndon Eyo so that its premises could become the premises of Edoho Memorial Grammar School whose name was now changed to Government Secondary School, Afaha Eket while the former premises of Edoho Memorial Grammar School, Ikot Usoekong was taken over by the Nigerian Army.

In the 1970s and 1980s several communities, individuals and organizations established secondary schools in Eket to provide education for the increased population of the town. Such schools include Community Secondary Commercial School, Ikot Usoekong (1977), Girls High School, Ikot Ibiok (established in 1983 by the Eket Women Development Association), Nduo Eduo High School, Nduo Eduo, Community Secondary School, Idong Iniang (1982), CDA Secondary School, Iko Eket, Community Secondary School, Odio and Apostolic Church Secondary School, Esit Urua. The town has a number of private secondary schools and about 90 Private Nursery/Primary Schools. A few of such schools are Excellent Comprehensive Secondary School, Dayspring School, Hope Power International School, Ideal Preparatory School, Wills' Secondary Commercial School, Alex Secondary Commercial School, Bilson Secondary Commercial School, Pegasus Schools owned by Mobil Producing Nigeria, All-Weather International Nursery/Primary School, New Era International School, Aunty Chinny's International School, Divine Seeds Schools, Adiaha Obong Nursery/Primary School, Nobel's Nursery/Primary School, Ideal Nursery/Primary School, Abraham Memorial Nursery/Primary School, Apostolic Church Nursery/Primary School, Qua Iboe Church Nursery School, etc.

The only post-secondary educational institution in the Local Government Area is the privately owned Heritage Polytechnic owned by Dr Emmanuel Ekot, a Chemical Engineer. The school started in 2000 as Heritage College but in 2010 it was licensed by the National Board for Technical Education (NBTE) to operate as a Polytechnic. It is located at Ikot Udota, off Eket-Oron Road. The Mass Communication Department of the Polytechnic operates the Heritage Radio, Eket. There is also the School of Nursing attached to Immanuel Hospital, Eket, run by the Akwa Ibom State Ministry of Health for the training of Nurses. Mobil Producing Nigeria also runs a Technical Training Centre (TTC) for the training of technicians for the oil and gas industry.

== Health care ==
The iconic Immanuel General Hospital is the main public hospital in Eket. It was established by the Lutheran Mission in 1953 and the Rev. Dr Karl Kurth, the executive secretary of the Syndical Conference Missionary Board of North America officially opened the hospital and dedicated it to the glory of God in a special service on May 2, 1953, although the corner-stone laying ceremony was performed on 20 June 1951 with the participation of Sir John Stuart Macpherson, K.C.M.G., Governor-General of Nigeria. The 218-bed hospital is now owned and run by the Akwa Ibom State Ministry of Health which in 2020 commissioned the re-modelled and re-equipped Immanuel General Hospital. There is also a Psychiatric Hospital and a School of Nursing run by the State Ministry of Health.

There is a Government owned Polyclinic on Hospital Road and Health Centres at Idong Iniang, Okon, Efoi, Nduo Eduo, Idua, Ikot Ebok, Afaha Atai, Ebana, Esit Urua, Iko Eket, Ikot Usoekong, Odio, Ikot Ukpong, Ikot Abasi (Okon), Ikot Abia, Ikot Okudomo. The former Minister of Health, Senator Helen Esuene, facilitated the establishment of a Health Centre at Mkpok. Eket is blessed with a good number of private clinics which provide high-quality medical services to the people. There are also dentists, opticians and optometrists practising in Eket.

== Clans that constitute Ekid ==
Afaha Clan	Ekid Offiong Clan	Idua Clan	Okon Clan
Afaha Atai Afaha Ukwa Ata Idung Afaha Ekid Atai Ndon-Afaha Ekid Ebana Ede Urua Edebuk Effoi Ekepene Afaha Ekid Ekpene Ukpa Esit Urua Etebi Idim Afia Idung Imo Idung Offiong Idung Udofa Iko Ekwa Ikot Afaha Ikot Udota Nditia Odio Ofriyo Okopedi Idung Udo Osiok	Afia Nsit Asang Ikot-Uso Ekong Ata Idung-Inyang Uso Ekong Ebebi Ikot Uso Ekong Etebi Idung Akpaisang Etebi Idung-Iwak Idung Enen Uso Idung Udo Ikot Abasi Ikot Ebiyan Ikot Ekid Ikot Ibiok Ikot Odiong Ikot Udoma Ikot Uso Ekong Mkpok Ukwa	Atabong Idua Ikot Ebok Iseyid Idua Adoro Anigh Usung Inyang	Anana Ikot Abasi Ikot Abia Ikot Akpa Enang Ikot Akpa Ikpo Ikot Akpandem Ikot Ataku Ikot Ekpo Okon Ikot Ikpa Ikot Inyang Ikot Nsidibe Ikot Obio Ikot Obio Ata Ikot Obioro Ikot Okudom Ikot Oso Ikot Ukpong Nduo Eduo

== Political Wards ==
Wards	Ward Centers
Urban 1	Primary Sch., Idua
Urban 2	Primary Sch., Hospital Road, Ikot Ebiyan
Urban 3	Govt. Pri. Sch. Afaha Eket I
Urban 4	Town Hall, Okopedi Idung Udo
Okon 1	Sec. Com. Sch., Ikot Etukudo
Okon 2	Primary Sch., Ikot Obioanana
Okon 3	Primary Sch., Okon
Central 1	Primary School, Afaha Atai
Central 2	Primary School, Ikot Ibiok
Central 3	Primary School, Ofriyo
Central 4	Primary Sch., Ikot Usekong
Central 5	Primary Sch., Idung Offiong
Central 6	Primary Sch., Effoi
Central 7	Primary Sch., Odio

== Notable people ==
- Paul Bassey – sports journalist and administrator
- Samuel Bassey, trade unionist
- Eme Ufot Ekaette, Senator
- Nduese Essien, National Assembly representative
- Helen Esuene, former Minister of State for Health
- Uduokaha Esuene - former Military Governor of South Eastern State
- Although he is popularly known as Lemmy Jackson, his real name is Otu Udofa from the Udofa family of Idung Udofa village in Eket Local Government Area.
- Sunday Mbang Prelate of the Methodist Church Nigeria
