= 2011 Nigerian Senate elections in Akwa Ibom State =

The 2011 Nigerian Senate election in Akwa Ibom State was held on 9 April 2011, to elect members of the Nigerian Senate to represent Akwa Ibom State. Ita Enang representing Akwa Ibom North East, Aloysius Akan Etok representing Akwa Ibom North West and Helen Esuene representing Akwa Ibom South all won on the platform of Peoples Democratic Party.

== Overview ==
Affiliation	Party		Total
Affiliation	PDP	ACN	Total
Before Election	3	0	3
After Election	3	0	3

== Summary ==
District	Incumbent	Party	Elected Senator	Party
Akwa Ibom North East	Effiong Dickson Bob	PDP	Ita Enang	PDP
Akwa Ibom North West	Aloysius Akan Etok	PDP	Aloysius Akan Etok	PDP
Akwa Ibom North South	Erne Ufot Ekaette	PDP	Helen Esuene	PDP

== Results ==
=== Akwa Ibom North East ===
Peoples Democratic Party candidate Ita Enang won the election, defeating other party candidates.

2011 Nigerian Senate election in Akwa Ibom State
Party	Candidate	Votes	%
PDP	Ita Enang		
APC	-		
Total votes			
PDP hold			

=== Akwa Ibom North West ===
Peoples Democratic Party candidate Aloysius Akan Etok won the election, defeating Action Congress of Nigeria candidate Joseph Upkong and other party candidates.

2011 Nigerian Senate election in Akwa Ibom State
Party	Candidate	Votes	%
PDP	Aloysius Etok		
APC	Joseph Upkong		
Total votes			
PDP hold			

=== Akwa Ibom South ===
Peoples Democratic Party candidate Helen Uduoakaha won the election, defeating Action Congress of Nigeria candidate Joseph Upkong and other party candidates.

2011 Nigerian Senate election in Akwa Ibom State
Party	Candidate	Votes	%
PDP	Helen Esuene		
APC	Umoetuk Akpasam		
Total votes			
PDP hold			
