= Udoma =

Udoma may refer to:

== People ==
- Udoma Udo Udoma (born 1954), Nigerian politician
- Egbert Udo Udoma (1917–1998), Nigerian lawyer

== Other uses ==
- Ikot Udoma, village in Nigeria
