= 2007 Nigerian Senate elections in Akwa Ibom State =

The 2007 Nigerian Senate election in Akwa Ibom State was held on 21 April 2007, to elect members of the Nigerian Senate to represent Akwa Ibom State. Effiong Dickson Bob representing Akwa-Ibom North East, Erne Ufot Ekaette representing Akwa-Ibom South and Aloysious Akan Etok representing Akwa-Ibom North-West all won on the platform of the People's Democratic Party.

== Overview ==
Affiliation	Party		Total
Affiliation	AC	PDP	Total
Before Election	0	3	3
After Election	0	3	3

== Summary ==
District	Incumbent	Party	Elected Senator	Party
Akwa-Ibom North-East	John James Akpan Udo-Edehe	PDP	Effiong Dickson Bob	PDP
Akwa-Ibom South	Udoma Udo Udoma	PDP	Erne Ufot Ekaette	PDP
Akwa-Ibom North-West	Bob Itak Ekarika	PDP	Aloysious Akan Etok	PDP

== Results ==
=== Akwa-Ibom North East ===
The election was won by Effiong Dickson Bob of the Peoples Democratic Party (Nigeria).

2007 Nigerian Senate election in Akwa-Ibom State
Party	Candidate	Votes	%
PDP	Effiong Dickson Bob		
Total votes			
PDP hold			

=== Akwa-Ibom South ===
The election was won by Erne Ufot Ekaette of the Peoples Democratic Party (Nigeria).

2007 Nigerian Senate election in Akwa-Ibom State
Party	Candidate	Votes	%
PDP	Erne Ufot Ekaette		
Total votes			
PDP hold			

=== Akwa-Ibom North West ===
The election was won by Aloysious Akan Etok of the Peoples Democratic Party (Nigeria).

2007 Nigerian Senate election in Akwa-Ibom State
Party	Candidate	Votes	%
PDP	Aloysious Akan Etok		
Total votes			
PDP hold			
