= Ikot Inyang =

Ikot Inyang may refer to:

- Ikot Inyang, Eket, a village in Eket local government area of Akwa Ibom State, Nigeria
- Ikot Inyang, Etinan, a village in Etinan local government area of Akwa Ibom State, Nigeria
