= Afaha Atai =

Afaha Atai Afaha Atai
- village
- Location in Nigeria
- Coordinates: 4°38′24.32″N 7°58′8″E
- Country: Nigeria
- State: Akwa Ibom

Afaha Atai is a village in Eket local government area of Akwa Ibom State. It is surrounded by Afaha Ukwa, Ata Idung Afaha Ekid, Atai Ndon-Afaha Ekid, Ebana and Ede Urua.

The people of Afaha Atai primarily engage in farming and cultivating of Palm Tree, Yams, Cassava and Palm Wine. They speak Ekid.
