= Nduese Essien =

Nigerian politician (born 1944)

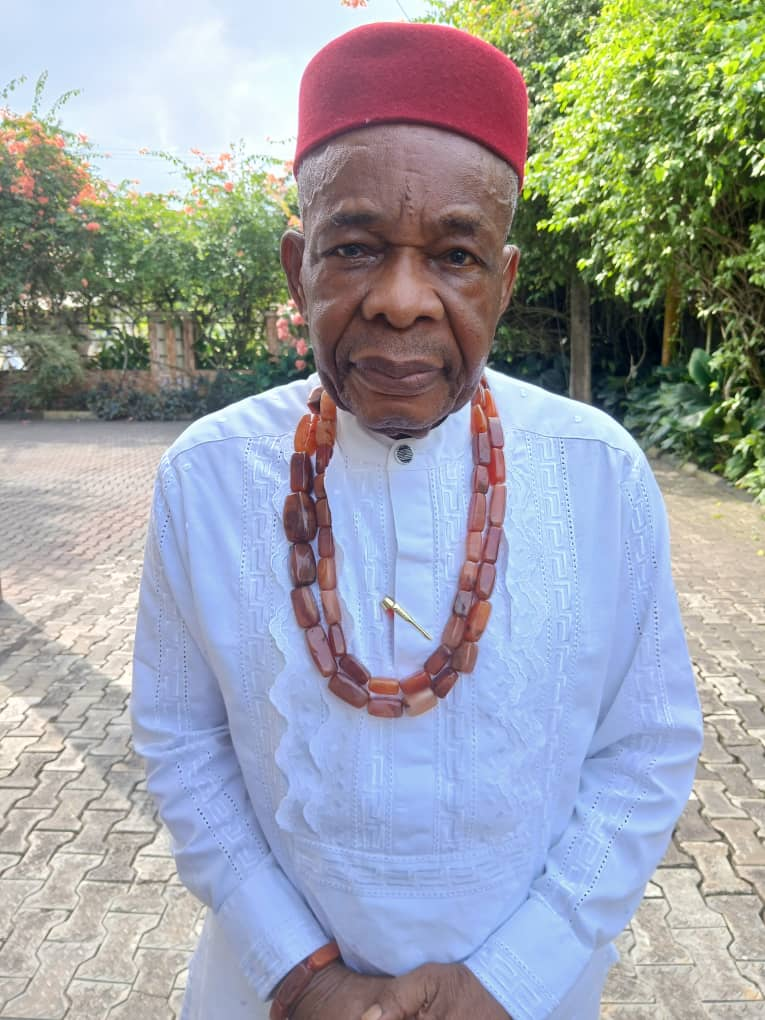
- Chief Nduese Essien

Member of Petroleum Resources Committee which produced the Bill for Establishing Niger Delta Development Commission

Federal Minister of Lands, Housing & Urban Development
- In office 6 April 2010 – 5 March 2014
- Succeeded by: Amal Pepple

Personal details
- Born: 2 February 1944 (age 82) Eket, Akwa Ibom State, Nigeria

Nduese Essien (born 2 February 1944) was a Nigerian National Assembly representative from Akwa Ibom state from 1999 to 2007, the position he held at the House of Representatives includes the leader of south-south parliamentary caucus and Chairman of House Committee on Anti-corruption, National Ethics and Values. He was later appointed by President Umaru Yar'Adua into the Technical Committee on the Niger Delta, where he worked with others to resolve the crisis in the oil-rich region. He was also appointed Federal Minister of Lands, Housing & Urban Development on 6 April 2010, when acting president Goodluck Jonathan announced his new cabinet.

== Early life ==
Essien was born on 2 February 1944 into the family of Elder Johnie Essien Etukudo of Nta Isip-Ikot Ibiok, Eket Local Government Area of Akwa Ibom State.

== Primary and secondary education ==
He attended Eket Group School, Ofriyo Group School, and Qua Iboe Church Primary School, Usung Inyang, Eket, between 1949 and 1957, passing his First School Leaving Certificate with Distinction in 1957. In the same year, he proceeded to Salvation Army Secondary School, Akai Ubium, completing his secondary education in 1962 with a Grade Two pass in the West African School Certificate Examination (WASCE).

== Higher education ==
Essien pursued his Higher School studies at St Augustine’s Grammar School, Nkwerre, in Orlu between 1963 and 1964, where he obtained the Higher School Certificate Examination (HSc), which qualified him for university entry. His pursuit of a university degree was interrupted by the Nigerian Crisis and the subsequent Civil War (1965–1970). During this period, he taught in several secondary schools, including Evangel High School, Old Umuahia; Okija Grammar School, Okija; and Edoho Memorial Grammar School, Ikot Usekong, Eket.

He eventually gained admission to Ahmadu Bello University (ABU), Zaria, in September 1969, where he studied for a Bachelor of Science (BSc) degree in Business Administration, graduating in 1972.

== Career ==
Upon graduation, Essien began his career as a Commercial Officer and later became the Assistant Advertising Manager at the Cross River State Newspaper Corporation, publishers of the Nigerian Chronicle newspapers.

In 1974, he transitioned into academia, joining the College of Technology, Calabar (now Cross River State University), as a Lecturer. He resigned in 1979 to establish his own management consultancy practice.

== Business and entrepreneurship ==
Essien founded Studentscare Services Ltd, a books publishing and marketing company, with its Head Office in Calabar and branches at the University of Uyo and the University of Calabar. He undertook several professional courses throughout his career, specializing in Marketing, Management Development and Training, Personnel Management, Public Relations, and Conflict Resolution, both in Nigeria and abroad. He is a member of the Nigerian Institute of Management (NIM).

== Political career and public service ==
Nduese Essien combined his business ventures with an active role in community service and politics.

=== Early political involvement ===
His early political involvement included serving as the Public Relations Officer (PRO) of the National Party of Nigeria (NPN) and, later, as the Deputy Chairman of the Liberal Convention.

=== Member of the House of Representatives (1999–2007) ===
In 1999, Essien successfully contested and was elected as a member of the House of Representatives on the platform of the Peoples Democratic Party (PDP), representing the Eket Federal Constituency (comprising Eket, Esit Eket, Onna, and Ibeno Local Government Areas). He was re-elected for a second term in 2003, serving until 2007.

In 1979 Essien was the Public Relations Officer of the National Party of Nigeria in Eket. He remained active in local politics, and in 1999 was selected as People's Democratic Party (PDP) National Assembly candidate for the Eket, Onna, Esit Eket and Ibeno constituency in Nigeria. He was elected, and in April 2003 was reelected, leaving office in May 2007.

==== During his tenure ====
For Essien's first term (1999–2003), he served as the Chairman of the South-South Parliamentary Caucus and was a member of the House Committees on Internal Affairs, Petroleum Resources, and Women Affairs. As Caucus Chairman, he initiated the crucial meetings of the South-South Governors with National Assembly Members, which were instrumental in advocating for the rights and development of the region. These efforts are credited with contributing significantly to, the establishment of the Niger Delta Development Commission (NDDC), the payment of the 13% derivation revenue to oil-producing states., the abrogation of the offshore/onshore oil dichotomy and general national awareness regarding the devastation in oil-producing communities.

For Essien's second term (2003–2007), he was appointed Chairman, House Committee on Anti-Corruption, National Ethics and Values. Internationally, he was Chairman of the African Parliamentarians Network Against Corruption (APNAC) and served as the Executive Director for West Africa.

=== Ministerial appointment ===
In 2010, Chief Essien was appointed the Minister of Lands, Housing and Urban Development by President Goodluck Jonathan, serving in the Federal Executive Council.

=== National Conference and Elder Statesman role ===
He was selected to serve as an Elder Statesman nominee at the 2014 National Conference. He currently holds the position of Political Leader of Eket Senatorial District in Akwa Ibom State.

== Personal life ==
Nduese Essien is married and has children and grandchildren.

== Traditional titles ==
He holds several prominent traditional chieftaincy titles, including:

- Atta of Ekid
- Ada Idaha ke Efik Ebrutu
- Onwa in Amaise (Anambra State)
- Nturukpum Ekid Afid
