= Edebuk =

- Village
- Interactive map of Edebuk
- Coordinates: 4°37′00″N 7°56′53″E
- Country: Nigeria
- State: Akwa Ibom
- Local Government Area: Eket

Edebuk is a village in Eket local government area of Akwa Ibom State in Nigeria. It is one of the villages that make up the Afaha Clan in Eket.

Their language is the Eket language.

== See also ==
- Ebana (village)
