= Ikot Udoma =

Village in Akwa Ibom State, Nigeria

- Interactive map of Ikot Udoma
- Vehicle registration: KET

Ikot Udoma is a village in Eket Local Government Area of Akwa Ibom State, Nigeria. It is one of the villages under Abikpi (Ebikpi) sub-clan of Eket Offiong clan. It is bounded by Afia Nsit, Ofriyo and Odoro Enen villages to the north, Ikot Ibiok and Mkpok villages to the south, Idua Village to the west and Ata Idong Inyang Usoekong village to the east.

== History ==
Ikot Udoma is a very old village. According to oral tradition by the various families in the village it was founded in the 15th century by Udoma (Udo Ama), the son of Ekpitat. As a part of the Abikpi Clan, the people of Ikot Udoma trace their migration route from the south western part of the Camerouns through Okposo in the riverine part of former Eket Local Government Area to Idung Udo villages from where the Abikpi people dispersed to Ikpa village, Ndon Obong near Ikot Usoekong and Iko Eket villages. From "Ndon Obong" which means the homestead of Obong) the people settled at their current location and Afia Nsit villages while some people crossed the Ubium creek to Nduo Eduo and other places. People of other clans also settled at Ikot Udoma, e.g. Afaha, Nnama and Abighe people. Of these only Afaha people are still living in the village with the Abikpi people (see Eastern Regional Local Government Law 1955 (E.R. No. 26 of 1955, B263 - B267) published in Supplement to the Eastern Regional Gazette No. 23 Vol.6 of 18 April 1957-Part A where component families in the village are named. Ekang or Esetang family is of Afaha clan.

Ikot Udoma village first got into colonial records when government troops were sent to burn down the village on 7 February 1899. This exercise was part of the "1899 Eket Punitive Patrol", a "scorched-earth" effort designed to punish the people of the area and instill fear into them in order to achieve their submission to the colonial authorities.

== Composition ==
The village is made up of four lineal groups known as "Ekpuks", i.e. groups of related families tracing their origin to a common ancestor. These "Ekpuks" are Ekpuk Ndito Asamudo Nnua Edem, Ekpuk Ndito Inyang, Ekpuk Nung Ekang (Afaha) and Ekpuk Nung Assam Ekanim Akpasam. These four "Ekpuks" are divided into ten families. Ekpuk Asamudo Nnua Edem is divided into 6 families, namely, Nung Edohoeket, Nung Nkamiang, Nung Asamudo Otu, Nung Akpedem, Nung Isonguyo and Nung Ekid Okpo. Ekpuk Ndito Inyang is divided into Nung Inyang and Nung Ikott (anglicized to Okott) Ekerema families. Nung Assam Ekanim Akpasam and Nung Ekang (Afaha) clan constitute the two remaining groups.

The village can now be rightly classified as a town in as much as it now has a cosmopolitan outlook which is reflected in its increased population, the varied ethnic composition of the population and its urban outlook. A good percentage of the population is made up of non-indigenes of the village who have settled in the village as the population of Eket continues to grow.

The village is governed by a Village Head who is supported by a Town Council made up of representatives of the ten families. The Town Council is headed by a Chairman supported by a Vice Chairman, Secretary, Treasurer, etc. From 6 September 2019, late Chief Sampson Simon Obot (23 June 1948 – 19 June 2024) was the village head. He died on 19 June 2024 and was buried on 9 December of the same year.

=== Religion ===
As indigenous African people, before the advent of Christianity in the area, Ikot Udoma people practised traditional African religion under which "Akwa Abasi Ibom Anyong" (meaning the Almighty Creator of Ibom who dwells on High) was recognized although sacrifices and libations were also made to a pantheon of deities and ancestors. The worship of "Eka Abasi" (the Mother Deity) was also widely practised. The other deities of the village were "Idim Ntied" for Ndito Asamudo Nnua Edem and "Ibit Ayu" for Ndito Inyang. Various cults and secret societies were widely patronized and celebrated, e.g. Ekpo, Ekpe, Inam, Ekong, Idiong (for men), and Ebre and Iban Isong (for women). Slavery, human sacrifice, the killing of twins and the banishment of twin mothers were a few of the social and religious practices that the Christian Missionaries, e.g. Mary Slessor, Samuel Bill, etc. and the nascent colonial administration contended with in the last decade of the nineteenth century, e.g. the colonial military expedition to the village on 7 February 1899 which led to the destruction and burning of houses and the loss of priceless elephant tusks and other valuables. Up till today, the villagers still remember the "white man's" war and the atrocities that were committed.

With the advent of Christianity arising from the founding of Qua Iboe Church by the Rev Samuel Alexander Bill at Ibeno in 1887 Ikot Udoma became a bastion of Christianity early in the twentieth century, especially with the establishment of Qua Iboe Church in Ofriyo village in 1913 which served the four neighbouring villages - Ofriyo, Ikot Udoma, Odoro Enen and Afia Nsit commonly known as Idong Iniang (Four Towns) before the recognition of Afaha Eket Odoro Enen as the fifth village in the group. Today the village has many churches and ministries, namely, Qua Iboe Church (established in 1940 after breaking up from Qua Iboe Church, Ofriyo; Faith Terbanacle Congregation (early 1950's); Christ Apostolic Church (early 1950's); The Church of Christ (January 1957); Assemblies of God Church, Mount Zion Lighthouse Full Gospel Church; The Apostolic Church; The Redeemed Christian Church of God; Glory world International Gospel Centre; Abundance Life Ministries, etc.

== Education ==
The first school in the area was the Primary School established by the Qua Iboe Church, Ofriyo which served the four villages. The School was taken over by the Eket County Council in 1964 and is now known as Primary School, Idiong Iniang, to reflect the commitment of the four villages to its existence and progress. The first school to be sited in Ikot Udoma Village was the UPE School along Ikot Ibiok Road which was established by the Eastern Regional Government in 1957/58. The Universal Primary Education (UPE) programme of the Eastern Nigerian Government failed and this school did not grow beyond Standard 5 before it was downgraded to the status of a Junior Primary School (Primary 1 to Primary 3). It was merged with Primary School, Idong Iniang, in the early 1970s. The site of this historic school has since been re-possessed by some of the villagers. The village now has several Secondary and Nursery/Primary schools, e.g. Community Secondary School, Idong Iniang (jointly established by the Idong Iniang Welfare Association and the four villages of Idong Iniang), Excellent Comprehensive Secondary School, Dayspring High School, Donema Nursery School, Victina International School, MC Prime Montessori Nursery School, etc.

== Health Care ==
The only government-owned health facility in the area is the Polyclinic at Afia Nsit village which is run by the Eket Local Government.

== Commercial Activities ==
Several business undertakings provide catering services, entertainment and relaxation, e.g. Modern City Guest House, Tinkle Fast Food, Octagon Event Centre, etc. The IDEMGH-LINK GROUP OF COMPANIES was recently established in the community to provide services in the oil industry. Numerous small-scale shops and stores in the village anchor commercial activities but there are also locked up stores at Udua Obo which used to be a daily evening market patronized by the four villages up to the 1980s.

The Akwa Ibom State Government under Obong Victor Attah as Governor established a Low Cost Housing Estate in the village. The estate is located along Ikot Udoma-Atai Idong Road.

== Farming and other Occupations ==
Just like any other village in Eket, Ikot Udoma people have practised subsistence farming since the founding of the village. The farms were of two categories - the farm within and around the residential part of the village known as "akogh" and the farms some distance away from the village. The major crops planted were cassava, yam, coco-yam, plantain, banana, vegetables such as fluted pumpkins, okra, melon, etc. In "akogh" the men planted fruit trees, plantains, bananas and the species of yams that needed very big trees to creep on while the women planted vegetables that could be harvested for urgent needs without having to walk a long distance to the farm. Other crops were planted in the distant farms. The farm work was done mainly by the women and their children but the men helped to clear the land and to get the sticks for supporting the yams to creep on. A greater part of the harvested products was consumed by the family while some was exchanged in the local evening market or sold at Fionetok market or Udua Nka located in Eket town.

The rotational planting fallow system of farming such as described by Dr W.B. Morgan was generally practised whereby some farmlands were cultivated over a period of one year or two and then left fallow for about five years while the farmers shifted their farming activities to other farmlands. All the villagers knew which farmlands would be cultivated in a particular year and the ones to be cultivated the following year. In this way, everyone cultivated farmlands at one location each year. This uniformity in rotation ensured that one family did not farm alone at one location while other families were at other locations. This method allowed the soil to recover and regenerate itself naturally as fertilizers were not known in those days. This farming method was possible because the population was small and there were enough farmlands to farm on and to spare. The names of some of the popular farmlands were Ndon Obong, Akai Uyo, Atemfegh, Anigh Idua, Edi Ite, Mbukpönö, Udua Akwöng Nno, Ndiöng Akpe Udögh, Akai Udua, Iko Akpe Eka, Abia Udök, Idim Anigh, Ndun Akpe Udim, Iko Nkukruk, Atama Idang, Mkpa Ukugh, Ndedeng, Ndon Obio Edem, Atai Ukana, Udua Ateke, etc. With the advent of western education and the flourishing of white-colour jobs and the resultant population explosion in the village and its environs, most of these farmlands have now become residential or commercial areas, thereby depriving the indigenous people of farmlands.

For protein, the villagers set traps for games in the bushes and forests or caught fresh-water fish in the seasonal streams such as Mkpa Nsat, Ifukho, Idim Nweb, Isi Nsang, Idim Anigh, Akai Udua and Abak Idim. Locally made fish traps known as "Ikpaa" were used but some people also used hooks and baits. Occasionally, groups of young and middle-aged men who had dane guns organized hunting expeditions in the day time. They used specially trained hounds for tracking and retrieval of games shot. A few daring hunters hunted in the night using a kind of carbide lamp (acetylene gas lamp) tied to the head to provide forward illumination in the night.

As Ikot Udoma is in the mangrove belt which experiences six months of heavy rains and six months of harsh sunshine and harmattan, wild oil palm trees were found in abundance in the bushes, swamps and forests. It was a thing of pride for boys and young men to learn how to use the locally made climbing robes known as "Ikpoo" to climb the tall oil palm trees in order to harvests the fruits from which were processed palm oil and kernels. Some of the palm oil and kernels were consumed at home but some quantities were also sold to produce buyers who sold them to the foreign trading companies located near the Qua Iboe River at Eket town, e.g. Royal Niger Company, United Africa Company (UAC), Patternis Zochonis (PZ), GB Olivant, French Company (CFAO) and German company Rafia palm trees were also found in abundance in the swamps and forests. The men tapped the rafia palm trees for the sweet palm wine that was relished by the natives before the advent of European traders and their factory-distilled alcoholic beverages. Fresh and "over-night" palm wine was a most valued beverage in all the Eket and Ibibio communities and it was a prominent item at marriage ceremonies, burials, social events, etc. With time the villagers learnt how to ferment and distil the palm wine in order to make a stronger type of alcohol known as "ufo-fop" or "ogogoro" in pidgin English. From the rafia palm trees, the people cut bamboos for fencing, furniture making and for constructing the rafters for the roofs of their houses. From the long leaves of the rafia palm trees, thatch was woven for roofing while the trunk of the trees provided piassava which was used for making climbing ropes (Ikpoo) or processed for sale to the foreign trading companies.

Women had some domestic animals in their compounds such as goats and chickens which could be slaughtered for food or sold at the market to provide funds for important projects, e.g. payment of school fees, payment of bride price, etc.
