= Ukpong =

Ukpong may refer to:

- Moses Ukpong, Nigerian politician
- Ikot Ukpong, village in Nigeria
