= Ikot Ebiyan =

- Village
- Interactive map of Ikot Ebiyan
- Country: Nigeria
- State: Akwa Ibom
- Local Government Area: Eket

Ikot Ebiyan is a village in Eket local government area of Akwa Ibom State.

The people of Ikot Ebiyan like the people of Afaha Atai primarily engage in farming and cultivating of Palm Tree, Yams, Cassava and Palm Wine. They speak Ekid.
