= Ebana (village) =

- Village
- Interactive map of Ebana
- Country: Nigeria
- State: Akwa Ibom
- Local Government Area: Eket

Ebana is a village in Eket local government area of Akwa Ibom. It is one of the villages that make up the Afaha Clan in Eket.

Their language is the Ekid Language.

== See also ==
- Afaha Atai
- Ede Urua
- Esit Urua
