= Esit Urua =

- Village
- Interactive map of Esit Urua
- Country: Nigeria
- State: Akwa Ibom
- Local Government Area: Eket

Esit Urua is a village in Eket local government area of Akwa Ibom State.

The people of Esit Urua similar to the people of Ekpene Ukpa primarily engage in farming and cultivating of Palm Tree, Yams, Cassava and Palm Wine. They speak Ekid.
