= Idim Afia =

- Village
- Etymology: White River
- Interactive map of Idim Afia
- Country: Nigeria
- State: Akwa Ibom
- Local Government Area: Eket

Idim Afia (White River) is a village in Eket local government area of Akwa Ibom State.

The people of Idim Afia primarily engage in fishing and other riverine activities. They speak Ekid. The village postal code is 524101.
