= 1999 Nigerian Senate elections in Akwa Ibom State =

The 1999 Nigerian Senate election in Akwa Ibom State was held on February 20, 1999, to elect members of the Nigerian Senate to represent Akwa Ibom State. Udoma Udo Udoma representing Akwa Ibom South, John James Akpan Udo-Edehe representing Akwa Ibom North-East and Bob Ittak Ekarika representing Akwa Ibom North-West all won on the platform of the Peoples Democratic Party.

== Overview ==
Affiliation	Party		Total
Affiliation	PDP	AD	Total
Before Election			3
After Election	3	0	3

== Summary ==
District	Incumbent	Party	Elected Senator	Party
Akwa Ibom South			Udoma Udo Udoma	PDP
Akwa Ibom North-East			John James Akpan Udo-Edehe	PDP
Akwa Ibom North-West			Bob Ittak Ekarika	PDP

== Results ==
=== Akwa Ibom South ===
The election was won by Udoma Udo Udoma of the Peoples Democratic Party.

1999 Nigerian Senate election in Akwa Ibom State
Party	Candidate	Votes	%
PDP	Udoma Udo Udoma		
Total votes			
PDP hold			

=== Akwa Ibom North-East ===
The election was won by Effiong Dickson Bob of the Peoples Democratic Party.

1999 Nigerian Senate election in Akwa Ibom State
Party	Candidate	Votes	%
PDP	Effiong Dickson Bob		
Total votes			
PDP hold			

=== Akwa Ibom North-West ===
The election was won by Bob Ittak Ekarika of the Peoples Democratic Party.

1999 Nigerian Senate election in Akwa Ibom State
Party	Candidate	Votes	%
PDP	Bob Ittak Ekarika		
Total votes			
PDP hold			
