= Ekpene Ukpa =

- Village
- Interactive map of Ekpene Ukpa
- Country: Nigeria
- State: Akwa Ibom
- Local Government Area: Eket

Ekpene Ukpa is a village in Eket local government area of Akwa Ibom State.

The people of Ekpene Ukpa similar to the people of Ikot Ebiyan primarily engage in farming and cultivating of Palm Tree, Yams, Cassava and Palm Wine. They speak Ekid.
