= QIC-United Evangelical Church =

UNITED EVANGELICAL CHURCH
- Abbreviation: UEC
- Type: Orthodox
- Chairman of Conference: Rev. (Dr) Samuel Udeme Ebukiba JP
- Preceded by: Rev. Chimaobi Uchechukwu Emelogu JP
- General Secretary: Rev. CG Achor
- Chairman Board of Trustees: Eld. Joe Abraham SAN
- Headquarters: 28 Nsikak Eduok Avenue, Uyo
- Territory: Nigeria
- Founder: Rev. Samuel Alexander Bill
- Origin: Ukpenekang, Ibeno
- Official website: unitedevangelicalchurch.org
- Slogan: Thy Word is Truth (John 17:17)

History
- Former name: Qua Iboe Church

The United Evangelical Church (Founded as Qua Iboe Church) is a Christian denomination in Nigeria. It has existed since 1887. It has more than 1,000 congregations and 500,000 members. The church was founded by an Irish missionary, Rev. Samuel Alexander Bill the first of many missionaries who served with The Qua Iboe Mission, now known as Mission Africa, which is based in Belfast. The Mission and Church were initially named after the place where the mission began its work, at Ibeno near the Qua Iboe River in the present day Akwa Ibom State of Nigeria. The church and mission have been entirely independent entities since 1984, but the two continue to work together closely.

The church has its headquarters at 28 Nsikak Eduok Avenue, Uyo in Akwa Ibom State. United Evangelical Church is a Bible believing church and does not practice doctrines that do not have any biblical background.

== Structure ==
The church maintains a four tier structure. There are the local units, each of which is an individual branch overseen by a local pastor, there is a Superintendency which comprises local branches at close proximity to each other and must not be less than 10 units, overseen by a Superintendent. A collection of five or more Superintendencies, makes up an area conference in what can be likened to the diocesan system of other Protestant churches. The assembly of all the area conference including the mission fields, makes up the National Conference and Rev Samuel Udeme Ebukiba is the current National Chairman of Conference while the General Secretary of the church is Rev. Chimaobi Gabriel Achor and its Board of Trustees' Chairman is Elder Joe Abraham (SAN). The National Chairman of Conference (COC) is the spiritual head of the church and oversees gatherings at the National level.

A breakaway group continues to term itself the QIC, but the United Evangelical Church is recognized by Mission Africa as the only true successor of the QIC.

== Main administrative branches ==
=== Area Conferences ===
1. Aba
2. Abuja
3. Ankpa
4. Ejule
5. Eket
6. Eziala
7. Ibaji
8. Idah
9. Ikemesit
10. Itam
11. Kaduna
12. Mbioto-Mkpat Enin
13. Ogugu
14. Ogwe
15. Olamaboro
16. Oloko
17. Ogwolawo
18. Ukanafun
19. Umuaro
20. Uyo

=== Superintendencies ===
1. Calabar Township
2. Calabar Municipal
3. Eleme Township
4. Lagos Township
5. Lagos Central
6. Lokoja
7. Makurdi
8. Ondo
9. Kano
10. Port-Harcourt Township
11. Rumuomasi Township
12. Toto

=== District ===
1. Benin
2. Bonny
3. Enugu
4. Oron
5. Owerri
6. Warri

=== Autonomous ===
1. Abak Itenge
2. Afaha Effiat
3. Asuna
4. Ikat Etetuk
5. Odoro Ikot
6. NWC Utako

=== Other Structures ===
NATIONAL WORSHIP CENTRE, UTAKO, ABUJA MISSION BOARD PACT WWTC HMH MEN'S FELLOWSHIP WOMEN'S FELLOWSHIP YOUTH FELLOWSHIP ADVANCE MISSION AFRICA

== Annual conference gatherings ==
The United Evangelical Church holds its rotatory annual conferences every last quarter of the year; preferably starting from the first week of December each year. This conference is the event where key decisions guiding the church's act for the next year are formulated and it is usually at such conferences that new pastors are ordained pending their induction into the college of ministers. Events at the conferences include: Sessions, Standing Committee and Ministry Committee meetings, the ordination, holy communion and thanksgiving services.

== See also ==
- Christianity in Nigeria
