= Stubb Creek Forest Reserve =

Forest reserve in Nigeria

The Stubb Creek Forest Reserve also known as Akoiyak Ekid, is a gazette forest reserve in Akwa Ibom State, Nigeria, established in 1930. The reserve has attracted several researchers from within and outside Nigeria, as it is considered a hotspot for biodiversity, especially it floral and faunal resources.

== Ownership dispute ==
In 2021, a public dispute emerged between Eket and Ibeno Local government areas of Akwa Ibom State on the ownership of Stubb creek forest reserve. This dispute was intensified following the interest of BUA Group of Companies in the forest.
