= Ikot Akpa-Ekop =

Coordinates: 4.6939°N 7.7857°E

Ntan Ide Ekpe is a village in Onna Local Government Area of Akwa Ibom State. It is surrounded by Ikot Edem Udoh Village, Ikot Obio Itong, Ukam and Ikot Akpa Ekop, all in Akwa Ibom State.

Ntan Ide Ekpe village has agricultural crops like: Palm tree, Palm wine tree, yam, cassava, okro, and many other crops. It has fruits like mango, paw paw, pears, oranges and many other fruits. The people of Ntan Ide Ekpe uses a general market within the location called Urua Ukam i.e. "Ukam market" apart from the village' owned general market refer to as Urua Ntan. This market (Urua Ukam) is attended by many villages in the neighborhood. People from other states like Abia state and Imo state to buy farm produce at wholesales as they cheap.
