= Moses Ukpong =

Nigerian politician and businessman (1964–2009)

Moses Udo Moses Ukpong
- Born: March 25, 1964; Ikot Ukpong, Eket
- Died: November 15, 2009 (aged 45)
- Resting place: Eket
- Occupation: Politician
- Years active: 1997– 2009
- Known for: Formation of PDP in Southern Nigeria
- Title: Rt. Hon Obong Dr.
- Term: 8 Years
- Political party: People's Democratic Party (Nigeria)

Moses Udo Moses Ukpong (March 23, 1964 – November 15, 2009) was a Nigerian politician, businessman, and heir to the throne of Ikot Ukpong kingdom, a kingdom in Akwa Ibom, Southern Nigeria. He was a member of the Akwa Ibom State House of Assembly representing Eket from 1999 to 2006.

== Background ==
Moses Ukpong was born into a royal family. His father was the king of Ikot Ukpong, a village situated in Eket, Akwa Ibom, Nigeria. Moses was the second son of Udo Moses Ukpong the king of Ikot Ukpong. On the death of his elder brother, he became next in line to the throne.

== Education ==
Moses Ukpong got his Bsc in Political Science from University of Calabar. He also attended the University of Nsukka. He also took short courses at Arts Educational Schools, London.

== Career ==
Ukpong began his career as a teacher at Nduo Eduo secondary school, Eket. He was promoted to Principal and served in that position for 3 years before he met his friend Senator Effiong Bob who convinced him to go into politics. During this period he also contributed to the formation of one of Nigeria's top political parties, the People's Democratic Party in the Southern part of Nigeria. He was among the first people to stand for election representing the PDP in Nigeria in 1998. He was elected to Akwa Ibom State House of Assembly in 1998 and held office for two terms. He served as a member of the Akwa Ibom State House of Assembly during the reign of Akpan Isemin and Victor Attah former governors of Akwa Ibom State.

== Death ==
Ukpong died November 15, 2009, after a brief illness.
