= Idung Imo =

- Village
- Interactive map of Idung Imo
- Coordinates: 4°39′37″N 8°00′04″E
- Country: Nigeria
- State: Akwa Ibom
- Local Government Area: Eket

Idung Imo is a village in Eket local government area of Akwa Ibom State.
