= Ikot Afaha =

Afaha
- Village
- Interactive map of Afaha
- Country: Nigeria
- State: Akwa Ibom
- Local Government Area: Essien Udim

Ikot Afaha is a village in Eket local government area of Akwa Ibom State.
