= Ikot Okudom =

Ikot Okudom Okon Clan
- Village
- Interactive map of Ikot Okudom
- Country: Nigeria
- State: Akwa Ibom
- Local Government Area: Eket

Ikot Okudom is a village in Eket local government area of Akwa Ibom State.
