= Ikot Odiong =

- Village
- Interactive map of Ikot Odiong
- Country: Nigeria
- State: Akwa Ibom
- Local Government Area: Eket

Ikot Odiong is a village in Eket local government area of Akwa Ibom State.
