= Ikot Ekpo Okon =

- Village
- Interactive map of Ikot Ekpo Okon
- Country: Nigeria
- State: Akwa Ibom
- Local Government Area: Eket

Ikot Ekpo Okon is a village in Eket local government area of Akwa Ibom State.
