= Idung Udo =

- Village
- Interactive map of Idung Udo
- Country: Nigeria
- State: Akwa Ibom
- Local Government Area: Eket

Idung Udo is a village in Eket local government area of Akwa Ibom State.
