= Ikot Nsidibe =

- Village
- Interactive map of Ikot Nsidibe
- Coordinates: 4.6710°N 7.9133°E
- Country: Nigeria
- State: Akwa Ibom
- Local Government Area: Eket

Ikot Nsidibe is a village in Eket local government area of Akwa Ibom State.
