= Etebi Idung-Iwak =

- Village
- Interactive map of Etebi Idung-Iwak
- Country: Nigeria
- State: Akwa Ibom
- Local Government Area: Eket

Etebi Idung-Iwak is a village in Eket local government area of Akwa Ibom State.
