= Ikot Obio =

- Village
- Interactive map of Ikot Obio
- Country: Nigeria
- State: Akwa Ebom
- Local Government Area: Eket

Ikot Obio is a village in Eket local government area of Akwa Ibom State.
