= ExxonMobil Nigeria =

Nigerian oil company

- Company type: Subsidiary
- Industry: Petroleum
- Founded: 1955; 71 years ago
- Headquarters: Victoria Island, Lagos, Nigeria
- Area served: Nigeria
- Key people: Shane Harris (MD)
- Products: Crude Oil; Natural Gas
- Parent: ExxonMobil

ExxonMobil has offshore oil production in Nigeria, and is the country's second largest crude oil producer. Mobil Producing Nigeria (MPN) began shallow water operations in 1955, and owns over 90 platforms and 300 producing wells covering 3,200 square kilometres (1,200 sq mi; 790,000 acres).

ExxonMobil also has deepwater production in Nigeria. Esso Exploration and Production Nigeria Limited (EEPNL) operates interests in the Erha, Usan, and Bonga developments.

ExxonMobil partners with the Nigerian National Petroleum Corporation (now NNPC Limited). The company operates in Akwa Ibom State, Nigeria.

ExxonMobil was working toward an agreement to sell all of its shallow water assets (MPN) to Seplat in August, 2022 for $1.3 billion to $1.6 billion, pending regulatory hurdles. However, in August 2022 the sale was thrown into doubt after Nigeria's president Muhammadu Bahari "withdrew his support for the sale less than three days after approving it."

As of March 2023, ExxonMobil was hoping to get government approval for the stalled sale of its shallow water oil production operations. In May 2024, a deal was agreed to divest its onshore operations to Seplat Nigeria.

== Environmental record ==
In 2010 the Nigerial government warned ExxonMobil after a series of offshore oil spills. According to Reuters, "Africa’s biggest energy producer has had just over 2,400 oil spills involving its foreign oil partners since 2006, according to the National Oil Spill Detection and Response Agency (NOSDRA), most of them onshore in the Niger Delta’s creeks."

In 2012, one major oil spill at an ExxonMobil oil facility in the Niger Delta spread 20 miles from its source. “This is the worst spill in this community since Exxon started its operations in the area,” said local fisherman Edet Asuquo, a member of the Mkpanak community.
