= Ikot Ikpa =

- Village
- Interactive map of Ikot Ikpa
- Country: Nigeria
- State: Akwa Ibom
- Local Government Area: Eket

Ikot Ikpa is a village in Etim Ekpo area of Akwa Ibom State.
