= Ita Enang =

Nigerian politician

Ita Solomon Enang

Senior Special Assistant (SSA) to the President of Nigeria on Niger Delta Affairs
- In office 29 May 2019 – 16 May 2022

Senior Special Assistant (SSA) to the President of Nigeria on National Assembly Matters (Nigerian Senate)
- In office 27 August 2015 – 29 May 2019
- Succeeded by: Senator Babajide Omoworare

Federal Representative
- In office May 1999 – May 2011
- Constituency: Ibiono Ibom (Akwa Ibom)

Senator of the Federal Republic of Nigeria from Akwa Ibom North-East Senatorial District
- In office May 2011 – May 2015
- Preceded by: Effiong Dickson Bob
- Succeeded by: Bassey Albert Akpan

Personal details
- Born: 23 August 1962 (age 63)
- Party: All Progressive Congress (APC)
- Occupation: Lawyer
- Website: http://www.itaenanglaw.com/

Ita Solomon Enang (born 23 August 1962) is a Nigerian politician who served as the senator representing the Akwa Ibom North-East senatorial district from 2011 to 2015. He represented the Itu/Ibiono Ibom Federal Constituency of Akwa Ibom State in the House of Representatives from 1999 to 2011. Enang also served as the Senior Special Assistant to President Muhammadu Buhari on National Assembly Matters from 2015 to 2019 and on Niger Delta Affairs from 2019 to 2022.

== Background ==
Enang was born on 23 August 1962. He attended the Presbyterian Teachers' Training College, Ididep, Akwa Ibom State, from 1974 to 1979. He was admitted to the University of Calabar, in 1980, where he studied law and graduated in 1984. He proceeded to the Nigerian Law School, Lagos, and was called to the Nigerian Bar in 1985. He then entered private practice and established his own law firm.

== Political career ==
Enang became a councillor in 1987 and a member of the Akwa Ibom State House of Assembly in 1992. He was elected to the House of Representatives in 1999. He served three terms as a member of the House of Representatives. His election to represent the Itu/Ibiono Ibom Federal Constituency in April 2007 was nullified in December 2007 by an Election Petition Tribunal sitting in Uyo. He was eventually reelected on 20 January 2010.

Enang worked toward the abolition of the onshore/offshore dichotomy, ensuring that his state of Akwa Ibom became the highest earner of oil revenue in the country. As the federal representative for Itu/Ibiono, Enang was appointed Chairman of the House Committee on Business and Rules.

In April 2011, Enang contested for the Senate seat of Uyo (North-East) on the Peoples Democratic Party (PDP) platform and won with 160,942 votes. The runner-up was Nsima Edem Umoh of the Action Congress of Nigeria (ACN) with 121,965 votes.

Enang served as the Senior Special Assistant to President Muhammadu Buhari on National Assembly Matters (Senate) from 27 August 2015 to 29 May 2019 and later on Niger Delta Affairs, following a letter of appointment dated 14 August 2019, which took effect from 29 May 2019. He resigned in May 2022 to pursue his governorship ambition under the All Progressives Congress (APC) but failed to secure the party's ticket for the election.
