= Egbert Udo Udoma =

African jurist

Sir Egbert Udo Udoma KBE, KJW

Knight Commander of the Order of the British Empire (KBE) Knight of John Wesley (KJW)

Personal details
- Born: Egbert Udo Udoma; 21 June 1917 Ibibio area, Akwa Ibom State, Nigeria
- Died: 2 February 1998 (aged 80)
- Citizenship: Nigerian
- Party: National Council of Nigeria and the Cameroons (early); United National Independence Party
- Children: Including Udoma Udo Udoma (son)
- Education: Methodist College, Uzuakoli; Trinity College Dublin; University of Oxford (PhD in Law, 1944)
- Occupation: Lawyer, Judge
- Known for: Chief Justice of Uganda (1963–1969); Justice of the Supreme Court of Nigeria; Chairman of the Constituent Assembly (1977–1978); One of the founding fathers of Nigeria; One of the first black Africans to earn a PhD in Law from Oxford

Sir Egbert Udo Udoma, KBE, (21 June 1917 – 2 February 1998) was a lawyer and justice of the Supreme Court of Nigeria. He was Chief Justice of Uganda from 1963 to 1969. He spent 13 years as a judge on the Supreme Court of Nigeria and was chairman of the Constituent Assembly from 1977 to 1978. He was one of the founding fathers of Nigeria. Udoma was one of the first black Africans to earn a PhD in Law in 1944 from Oxford University. He was knighted by Queen Elizabeth II and was a devoted Methodist and a holder of a knighthood of John Wesley (KJW).

== Life ==
He was born in the Ibibio area of Akwa Ibom State and attended Methodist College, Uzuakoli. After completing his secondary education, he proceeded abroad to study at Trinity College, Dublin (TCD) with the support of his community and the Ibibio Union, an organization which he later led. At TCD, he served as president of the University Philosophical Society, the student debating society. He later earned a postgraduate degree at Oxford University.

He returned to Nigeria to practise law in the mid-1940s, but became intrigued and moved by the nationalistic politics of the time. At the time, Nigeria was attracting returning emigrants who had left previously. He joined the National Council of Nigeria and the Cameroons early on, but left the party following a crisis in the former Eastern Region that saw the removal of Eyo Ita, an Ibeno man from office as the leader of the Eastern Region by Azikiwe. From 1953 to 1959, Udo Udoma was a member of the federal House of Representatives, under the platform of the United National Independence Party, then he was a leading proponent for the creation of a Calabar/Ogoja/Rivers state. However, his failure to succeed in the creation of an independent region or state in south-eastern Nigeria, and the triumph of the three major regions at a constitutional conference in 1958, led him to concede politics to the dominant parties.

He spent four years as a High Court judge before he was appointed Chief Justice of Uganda. He was a Knight Commander of the Order of the British Empire, and also belonged to the group that championed Nigerian independence from Britain and was one of the founding fathers of Nigeria. He died at the age of 80 on 2 February 1998.

== Personal life ==
He was the subject of two biographies: The Man: Sir Justice Udo Udoma by Dennis Udo-Inyang, and Law and Statesmanship: The Legacy of Sir Udo Udoma by Ekong Sampson. In 2008 the Estate of Sir Udo Udoma released The Eagle In Its Flight: Being The Memoir of the Hon. Sir Udo Udoma, CFR (Grace & Son). His third son Udoma Udo Udoma was a distinguished Senator of the fourth republic of the Federal Republic of Nigeria and the Minister of Budget and Planning under the Buhari administration.

== Publications ==
- The Lion and the Oil Palm and Another Essay (1943)
- The Story of the Ibibio Union (1987)
- History and the Law of the Constitution of Nigeria (1994)
