= Helen Esuene =

Nigerian politician (born 1949)

Helen Udoakagha Esuene

Minister of State for Health
- In office July 2005 – January 2006

Minister of Environment
- In office January 2006 – January 2007
- Preceded by: Iyorchia Ayu

Minister of Environment and Housing
- In office January 2007 – May 2007
- Preceded by: Rahman Mimiko (Housing)
- Succeeded by: Halima Tayo Alao

Senator for Akwa Ibom South
- In office April 2011 – May 2015
- Preceded by: Eme Ufot Ekaette

Personal details
- Born: 23 November 1949 (age 76)

Helen U. Esuene (born 23 November 1949) is a former Nigerian civil servant who was appointed Minister of State for Health, and later Minister of Environment and Housing in the Cabinet of President Olusegun Obasanjo between 2005 and 2007.

== Background ==
Esuene took a course in Confidential Secretaryship and Office Management at the Federal Training Centre in Kaduna and started her civil service career as a confidential secretary. Later, she did a distance course from the University of Leicester and obtained an MSc in finance. Shortly after, she married the former military governor of the old Cross River State, Chief Udoakaha Esuene, who died in 1996. They had two girls and three boys. She went into business, starting with human resource management for Mobil Producing. Later, she started what became Villa Marina Hotel in Eket, opening in 2000. She built an art gallery as a memorial to the over 59 women gunned down by the Colonial Lords along Consulate road in Ikot Abasi during the 1929 women protest.

== Obasanjo cabinet ==
Esuene was appointed Minister of State for Health in July 2005. She was appointed Minister of Environment in January 2006. After a cabinet reshuffle in January 2007, Esuene was given an expanded portfolio as Minister of Environment and Housing. She left office in May 2009 at the end of the Obasanjo administration.

== Senate ==
Helen Essuene was the candidate for the Senatorial seat of Akwa Ibom South in the April 2011 Nigeria general elections, running on the People's Democratic Party (PDP platform).
