= Ikot Inyang, Eket =

Ikot Inyang
- Village
- Interactive map of Ikot Inyang
- Country: Nigeria
- State: Akwa Ibom
- Local Government Area: Eket

Ikot Inyang is a village in Eket local government area of Akwa Ibom State.
