= Nduo Eduo =

- Village
- Interactive map of Nduo Eduo
- Country: Nigeria
- State: Akwa Ibom
- Local Government Area: Eket

Nduo Eduo is a village in Eket local government area of Akwa Ibom State.
