= Ikot Ukpong =

- Village
- Etymology: Followers of Ukpong
- Interactive map of Ikot Ukpong
- Country: Nigeria
- State: Akwa Ibom
- Local Government Area: Eket
- Development Ward: Okon
- Founder: Ukpong Nung Ese
- Time zone: UTC+1 (West Africa Time)

Ikot Ukpong is a village in Okon development ward II of Eket local government area, Akwa Ibom State, Nigeria. Ikot Ukpong means "Family of Ukpong" or "People of Ukpong". Ikot Ukpong is made up of different settler-families and descendants of the founder of the village. The deity of Ikot Ukpong was called "Ukpong Idem", meaning "spirit body". Other deities traditionally recognised by the village were Ekpo (ancestors) and Ndem Ikpa Isong (spirits of the land). Their primary language is Ibibio despite their affinity with Ekid people of Eket. Ikot Ukpong is occupied by the Ibibio people.

Ikot Ukpong is among the areas that were affected by the Atlantic slave trade of the sixteenth to nineteenth century.

== History ==
The original founder of Ikot Ukpong was Chief Ukpong Nung Ese, who owned more than half the landmass of the village and was addressed as obong (king). Chief Ukpong, the first obong, held much influence and grew to become popular as a great leader throughout the Ibibio and Efik people. He died after a long reign, and his first son named after him, Ukpong Akpan (first son) Ukpong was crowned the next king of the village. The village grew to be the most respected kingdom among the Ibibio people as the new king Ukpong Akpan Ukpong promoted and maintained peace in the land.

In the early 19th century, another king was crowned after the death of Ukpong Akpan Ukpong, the second ruler of the village. Moses Akpan Ukpong, the first son of Ukpong Akpan Ukpong, became the king and third ruler of the village; at this time Christianity had already made its way to the region and was spreading fast.

After the death of Ukpong Akpan Ukpong, Obong Michael Ikott Ikoh of the Nung IKO - Nung Ese segment of Ikot Ukpong, who for years was Udiana'bong (deputy to the king), became village head (Obong Idung) until his death in 1999.

After the death of Obong Michael Ikoh, the kingship moved to the family of Samson Eshiet according to the Rotational Laws of Kingship in Ikot Ukpong Village. The mantle fell on Obong Udo Samson Eshiet, who became village head until his death in 2008, and the kingship returned to the Moses Ukpong Family.

Moses Akpan Ukpong took over, and he played a role in converting the villagers who still believed in the traditional worship to Christianity. Moses Akpan Ukpong is married to a Christian wife.

Moses Akpan Ukpong remains alive and is the current king of Ikot Ukpong. Upon his death the line of succession falls to the next ruling family of Ikot Ukpong.

== Geography ==
=== Climate ===
Because of the effects of the maritime and the continental tropical air masses, the climate of Ikot Ukpong is characterized by two seasons, namely, the wet or rainy season and the dry season. The wet or rainy season lasts for about eight months. The rainy season begins in March or April and lasts until mid-November.

A mild dry season begins in mid-November and ends in March. During this brief period, the continental tropical air mass, northeasterly winds and an associated dry and dusty harmattan haze affects the village. However, as a result of proximity to the ocean, the harmattan dust haze, is relatively mild; it may only last for a few weeks between December and January. The farmers benefit from the harmattan characteristics as they are good for harvesting and storage of the food crop.

Ikot Ukpong records mostly cool temperatures throughout the year with rain all year round, even in the dry harmattan season.

== Infrastructure ==
The community has one health centre, one primary school and no secondary school. These infrastructure serve more than 6 other nearby villages in the area. An abandoned road project cuts through the village toward Ikot Obiota.

== Culture ==
The culture of the people is same as that of the rest of Ibibios with influences from the nearby Ekid people. In the late 1800s, the people of the area were receptive to European missionaries. Most villagers are now Christians and festivals tend to occur at Christmas time.

=== Food ===
In Ikot Ukpong, Yam, Garri, Cocoyam and Plantain are staple foods. There are many different types of soup prepared in that area; afang, atama, afia afere, afere nkoñ, abak, fisherman soup etc.

== Economy ==
The villages are mostly engaged in crop farming (mostly Palm Fruit, cassava, pumpkin -ubong and yams ) They also raise livestock. The region also falls under the crude oil-producing region in the state with many of its youth working as casuals in Exxon-Mobil company in Eket Town.

== See also ==
- Moses Ukpong
- Geography of Nigeria
- Akwa Ibom State
