= Ikot Inyang, Etinan =

Ikot Inyang
- Village
- Interactive map of Ikot Inyang
- Country: Nigeria
- State: Akwa Ibom
- Local Government Area: Etinan

Ikot Inyang is a village in Etinan local government area of Akwa Ibom State.
