= Mission Africa =

Christian mission organisation

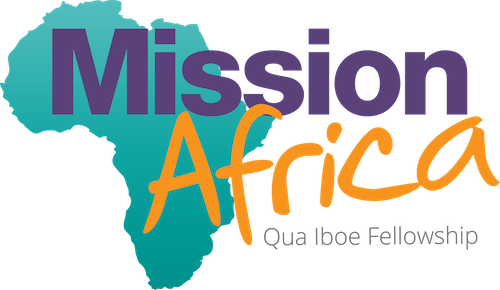
- Established: 1887
- Founder: Samuel Bill
- Type: Christian mission
- Purpose: Evangelism, training pastors, medical & compassionate care
- Headquarters: Belfast
- Origins: Qua Iboe Mission (until 1986), Qua Iboe Fellowship (until 2002)
- Region served: Nigeria, Burkina Faso, Chad & Kenya
- Website: https://www.missionafrica.org.uk

Mission Africa (formerly known as the Qua Iboe Mission and subsequently the Qua Iboe Fellowship) is an interdenominational, evangelical, Christian mission organisation. When founded in 1887, by the Irish independent missionary Samuel Bill, the organisation ministered in Nigeria. Today, it primarily works in Nigeria, Burkina Faso, Chad and Kenya while maintaining headquarters in Belfast, Northern Ireland. Its current Chief Executive is Mr Paul Wright.

== History ==
The roots of Mission Africa stretch back to the mid-1880s, when a group of chiefs from the Ibeno region of the Niger Delta approached the Calabar Mission of the Free Church of Scotland and asked for a missionary to work among them. The over-extended mission, unable to comply, passed on the request to Henry Grattan Guinness at his Harley Missionary Training College in London, where he circulated it. One of the college's trainees, Samuel Bill (1864–1942) from Belfast, responded energetically. In 1887, he set sail, without financial backing. The Calabar Mission could not afford him, and he started work alone at the mouth of the Qua Iboe River in December 1887, designing and constructing for himself a house, and the church at Upenekang. Bill's lifelong friend, Archibald Bailie commenced initial efforts at establishing a support base in Belfast for the new mission, but soon left Belfast to join Bill in Nigeria.

The Qua Iboe Mission Council was formed in 1891 by representatives of the leading Belfast churches, of various denominations, to support Samuel Bill's work. Missionaries were drawn from Presbyterian, Baptist, Quaker and other backgrounds. The Mission Council continues its oversight of the Mission up to the present day.

The Qua Iboe Church (now the QIC-United Evangelical Church of Nigeria) had by 2000 founded three colleges of theology, including the Samuel Bill Theological College at Ikot Ekang, Abak (started in the 1940s), three post-primary teaching institutions including Etinan Institute (started 1915), two hospitals (at Ekpene Obom and Ochadamu, the latter known as Holley Memorial Hospital) and a printing press at Etinan, as well as numerous primary schools. Membership of the Church was at first confined to rural areas, only slowly penetrating the towns and cities. By the year 2000, the denomination had grown to over 1,000 congregations throughout Nigeria which vary in size from around 50 people to over 1,000.

The Mission changed its name from Qua Iboe Mission to Qua Iboe Fellowship in 1986, and then became known as Mission Africa in mid-2002. The change of name was intended to convey the broader scope of the Mission, since it is no longer confined to one area of Nigeria. The official legal name of the mission is now Mission Africa (The Qua Iboe Fellowship). It is a registered company in Belfast (R611) and recognised by the British tax authorities (HMRC) as a charity, XN45493.

== Administration ==
Mission Africa is governed by a Home Council, drawn from the Christian Community in Northern Ireland. Everyday running of the mission is entrusted to the Chief Executive. Mission Africa is a member of Global Connections, the UK wide missions alliance, and Northern Ireland's mission facilitation organisation, Mission Agencies Partnership.

== Mission Africa Today ==
The organisation's missionary efforts today are focused on theological education, cross-cultural training, church planting, medical work, responding to HIV/Aids, literature evangelism, and youth ministry. Its work, in various spheres of mission, includes:

- Chad: working alongside the Evangelical Church of Chad (EET) and like minded mission agencies, most notably The Evangelical Alliance Mission (TEAM).
- Burkina Faso: A concentration on church planting and rural development. Partners in Burkina are Evangelical Protestant Church. (EPE). WEC International worked in Burkina Faso for many years and Mission Africa were pleased to partner with them.
- Nigeria: Mission Africa is primarily partnered with the QIC-United Evangelical Church, formerly the Qua Iboe Church, and supplies theological lecturers to the denomination's colleges. The Mission also supplies some support staff to the UEC hospitals.
- Kenya: since 2011, Mission Africa has been partnered with the Presbyterian Church of East Africa. As of 2015 the partnership has been limited to Mission Africa sending small teams to Kenya.
- Mission Africa also supply staff to the interdenominational Theological College of Northern Nigeria (TCNN) and the Jos ECWA Theological Seminary (JETS) which is the main seminary of the Evangelical Church of West Africa.
- In 2006 Mission Africa and UEC commenced the Stillwaters Project, renamed Advance in 2012, which intends to establish 1500 HIV/Aids care and counselling centres throughout Nigeria. Mision Africa has also been involved in HIV/Aids alleviation work through ECWA Evangel Hospital and The Faith Alive Foundation, both of which distribute antiretroviral drugs as part of the PEPFAR programme. ADVANCE is also engaged in various forms of compassionate ministry, such as rescuing orphaned and vulnerable children; this work primarily takes place in Kogi State.
- Africa Christian Textbooks, the literature distribution service that Mission Africa largely founded, supplies Christian academic books to students and pastors in Nigeria and Kenya. ACTS hopes to increasingly produce books by Africans for Africans, and also to translate many books for the Christian communities in the Francophone countries.

== References and Historical Studies ==
- Gerald H Anderson, ed., Biographical Dictionary of Christian Missions (Simon and Schuster Macmillan, NY,1998).
- J. S. Corbett, "According to Plan" (Belfast: QIF, 1986).
- R. J. Graham The Qua Iboe Mission 1887 - 1945 (PhD Thesis, University of Aberdeen)
- E. B. Ikpe, Qua Iboe Church of Nigeria: the first hundred years: the next jubilee (Uyo; QIC, 1987).
- W. Leach, "Century of Service in Nigeria" (Belfast: QIF, 1987).
- Robert L. McKeown, Twenty-five years in Qua Iboe: the story of a missionary effort in Nigeria (London: Marshal Morgan and Scott, 1912).
- D. O. Olayiwola "Origin, Growth and Impact of the Qua Iboe Church in Nigeria, 1887-1987" Neue Zeitschrift für Missionswissenschaft 1997, vol. 53, no. 1, pp. 61–68 [ISSN 0028-3495]
- Eva S. Watt, "The Quest for Souls in Qua Iboe" (London: Marshal Morgan and Scott, 1951).
- Margaret Ussher, Fifty plus : flash-back into H. W. Dickson's fifty years of vital missionary experience in Nigeria (Belfast : Qua Iboe Mission, 1972).
- Corbett, Jean S., All the days of my life : recollections of Herbert W. Dickson (Belfast : Qua Iboe Mission, 1981).
