= Samuel Bill =

Samuel A. Bill
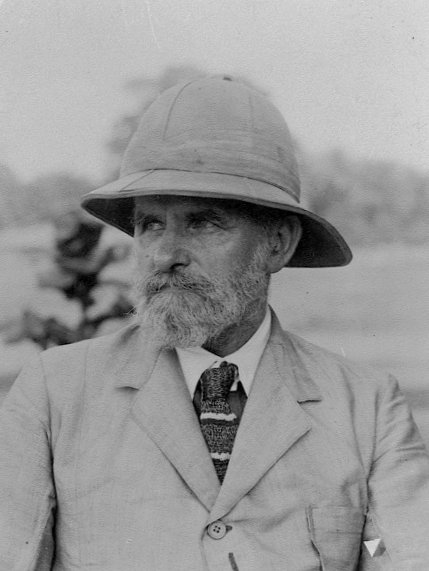
- Samuel Bill
- Born: 10 December 1863; Belfast, Northern Ireland
- Died: 24 January 1942 (aged 78); Ibeno, Akwa Ibom State, Nigeria
- Occupation: Missionary
- Known for: Christian missionary work in Africa; founding the Qua Iboe Church

Samuel Alexander Bill MBE (10 December 1864 – 24 January 1942) was an Irish Christian missionary, explorer and the founder of the Qua Iboe Mission (later renamed Mission Africa).

== Early life ==
Bill was raised in Ballymacarrett Presbyterian Church, east Belfast, but was most notably associated with Island Street Belfast City Mission Hall. His interest in missionary work was sparked by a visit to Belfast by Dwight L. Moody and Ira D. Sankey in 1874. He attended the Harley Missionary Training College in London, then under the leadership of Henry Grattan Guinness; and travelled to Nigeria to commence a work amongst the Ibeno people in 1887. The mission base was founded on the banks of the Qua Iboe River, and this base gave the name to the independent interdenominational mission that Bill founded in 1890. Bill was seen as a practical missionary, learning the Efik language, working with the Ibeno people, planting crops and running a trading station.

He was created a Member of the British Empire in 1938.

== Legacy ==
Bill was a contemporary of Mary Slessor. Although not as well known as his Scottish counterpart, Bill had a considerable impact. Many historians of the Irish evangelical missionary movement note that he was one of the most influential men of his time, inspiring many in Ireland to overseas Christian service. The Qua Iboe Mission grew to be one of the largest and most successful missions in the UK.

The denomination that he founded, Qua Iboe Church has grown to considerable proportions. Today known as the United Evangelical Church, it numbered at least 2 million in 2007. Bill's memory is revered by many Nigerian Christians today.

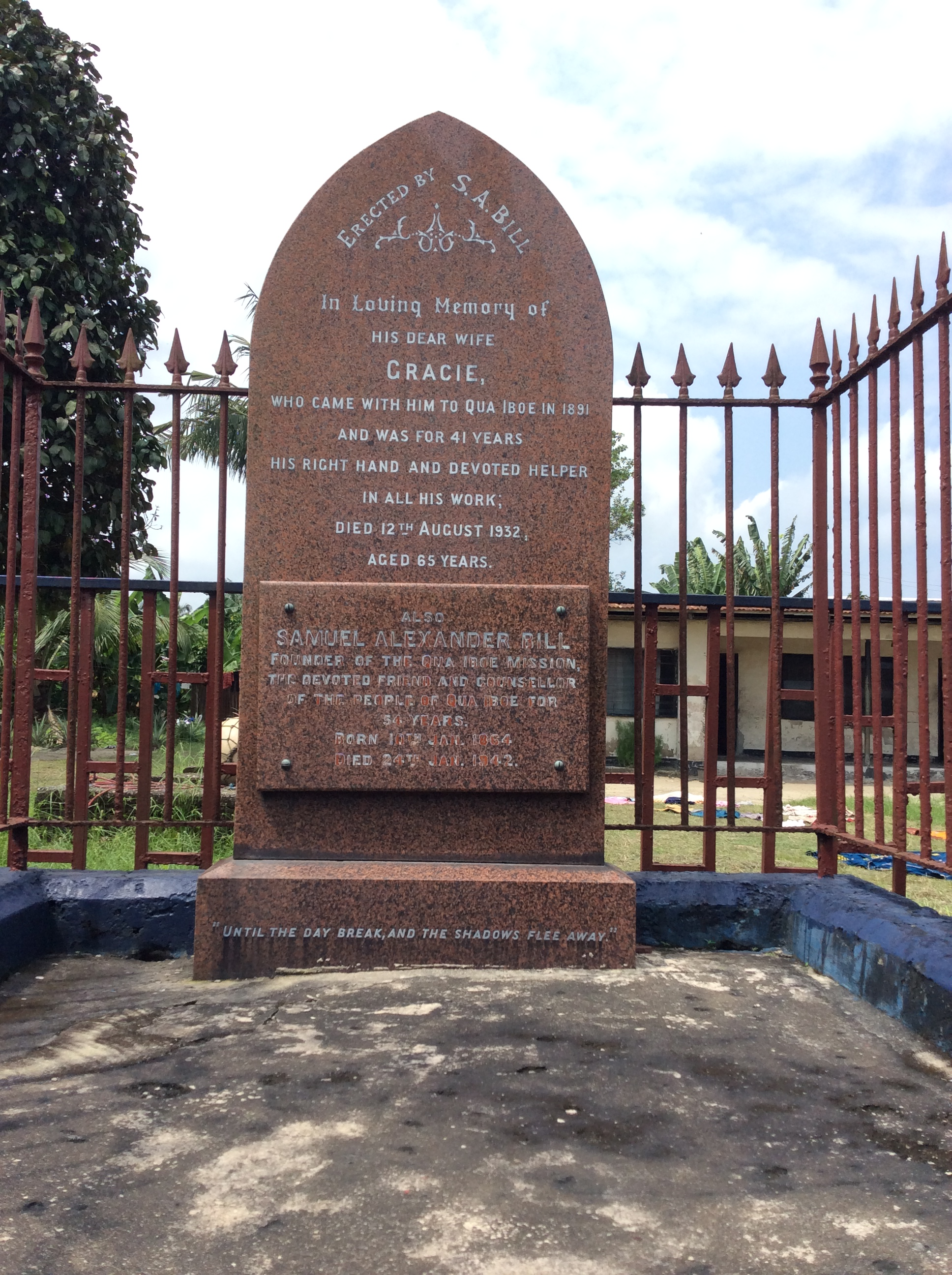
Samuel and Grace Bill's Tomb in Ibeno

A theological college at Abak in southern Nigeria is named in his honour.

== Family ==
Bill married Grace and they had two children, a daughter Emma McClements (Bill), Emma had served as a missionary alongside her husband, John McClements. John Alexander Paterson Bill; his son had planned to join his father’s missionary work as a missionary doctor, but was killed on 16 August 1917 during the Battle of Langemarck.

Bill's papers are held at the PRONI offices in Belfast.
