= Ibeno =

Local Government Area and major oil-producing community in Nigeria

Ibeno Ibuno Obolo
- LGA
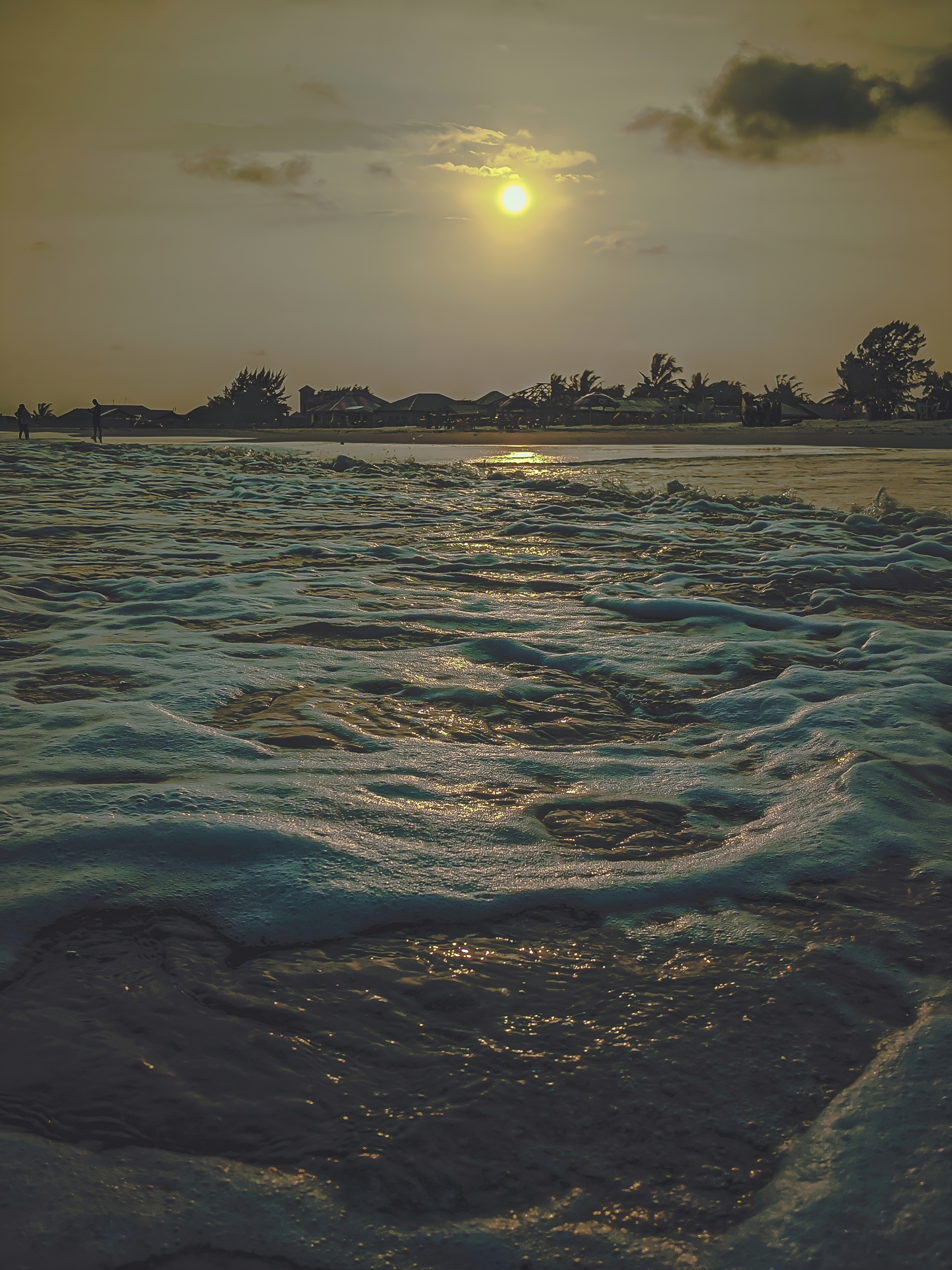
- Nickname: White Beach
- Motto: Abasi Ulok-Ulok Aye Abasi Ibeno is watching over us
- Interactive map of Ibeno
- Location within Nigeria
- Coordinates: 4.568693°N 7.976396°E
- Country: Nigeria
- State: Akwa Ibom State
- Head-Quarters: Upenekang

Government
  - Chairman: Hon. Mrs. (Dcns.) Glory Eka Effiong

Area
  - Total: 271.2 km^{2} (104.7 sq mi)

Population (2022)
  - Total: 95,500
  - Density: 352/km^{2} (912/sq mi)
- Time zone: UTC+1 (WAT)

Ibeno is a local government area of Akwa Ibom State in the southern part of Nigeria. It lies on the eastern side of the Kwa Ibo River, about 3 kilometres (1.9 mi) from the river mouth.

Ibeno is one of the largest oil-producing communities in Nigeria, being the host community to Exxonmobil Unlimited (now Seplat). It is also one of the largest fishing settlements on the Nigerian coast. Ibeno lies in the Mangrove Forest Belt of the Niger Delta region of Nigeria, bounded to the west by Eastern Obolo Local Government Area, to the north by Onna, Eket and Esit Eket, to the east by Mbo, and to the south by the Atlantic Ocean.

Ibeno is a Local Government Area (LGA) in Akwa Ibom State, Nigeria, known for its extensive coastline, fishing settlements, and as a host to oil exploration activities. The history of Ibeno LGA can be traced through its administrative and cultural evolution.

== Location ==
Ibeno Local Government Area is located at the south end of Akwa Ibom State, occupying a vast coastal area of over 1,200 km^{2}. It is bounded in the south by the Atlantic Ocean and shares borders with Mbo, Esit Eket, Eket, Onna and Eastern Obolo local government areas.

== Language ==
The people speak Ibono language, a Lower Cross language closely related to the Efik-Ibibio and Obolo (Andoni) language. The need to establish trade links with the Efik people meant that the Andoni people who settled in present-day Ibeno had to coin the language to suit. The people of Ibeno are of Oron-Efik and Obolo extraction.

== Major landmarks ==
- International Headquarters of the Qua Iboe Church
- Tombs of Samuel Alexander Bill and wife Grace Bill
- Mobil's Qua Iboe Terminal (now Seplat)o
- Ibeno Beach
- Atlantic Ocean
- Stubb Creek Reserve

== History ==
Ibeno Local Government Area was created out of the defunct Uquo-Ibeno Local Government Area on December 4, 1996, by the Federal government instrument.

Before the creation of Ibeno Local Government Area, the people of Ibeno and Eket people shared a Local Government Area – Eket, Ibeno Edoh, Uquo Ibeno. Ibeno Local Government Area has thus graduated from being part of Eket Local Government area to part of Ibeno-Edor with headquarters at Inua-Eyet Ikot Ibeno (now defunct) to being part of Uquo Ibeno with headquarters at Uquo (now headquarters of Esit Eket Local Government Area) to being a distinct and separate local government area, Ibeno Local Government Area with headquarters at Upenekang.

One major historical event in Ibeno was the arrival of the Rev. Samuel Bill at Ibeno in December 1887 at the request of Ibeno chiefs to establish a Christian Mission in the area. Through the establishment of the Qua Iboe Mission, Christianity and western education were brought to Ibeno, and from there Christianity and education spread to Eket, Etinan and other parts of Ibibio and Igbo lands and beyond.

Before the creation of Akwa Ibom State from the Old Cross River State, Ibeno, Eket, Onna and Uquo (Esit Eket) was one administrative area.

Subsequently, Eket and Onna was made distinctive Local Government Areas, while Ibeno and Uquo(Esit Eket) formed uquo- Ibeno Local Government Area with headquarters at Ibeno.

On December, 4th 1996, Ibeno Local Government Area was created from the defunct Uquo-Ibeno Local Government Area.

== Geography ==
Ibeno occupies the largest Atlantic coastline, more than 129 km, in Akwa Ibom State.

Located in the mangrove swamp forest, the area has rain throughout the year with the peak between May and September. The climatic condition in Ibeno is favorable all year round for fishing and farming.

Ibeno Beach, the longest in West Africa, is a popular tourist attraction.

== Commerce ==
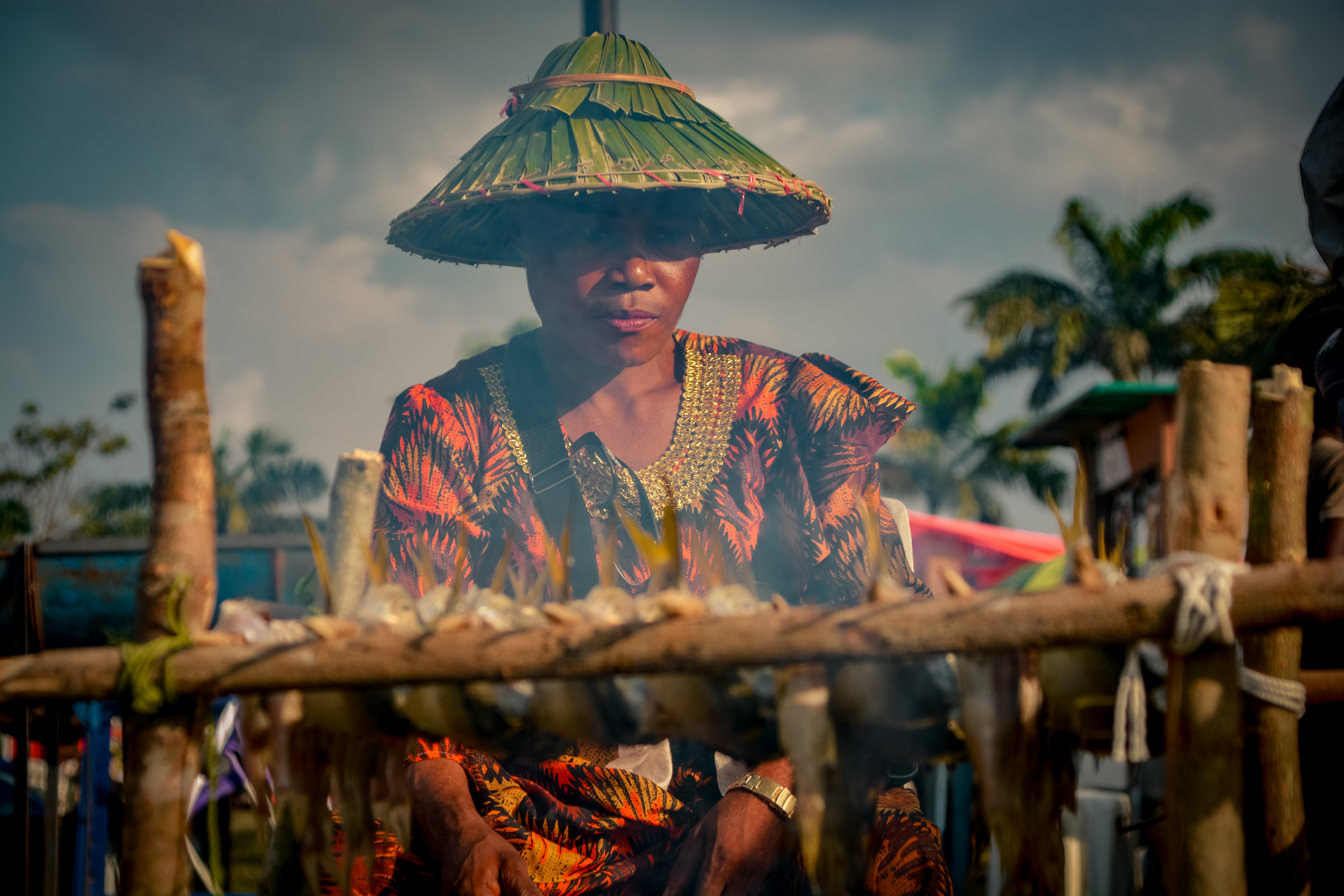
Woman smoking fish for preservation

The prime occupation of the people is fishing. However, farming and petty trading enjoy appreciative notice. The presence of oil exploration activities by oil giant ExxonMobil and other service companies influence activities both upstream and downstream.

Ibeno LGA is a major oil-producing hub in Akwa Ibom state, Nigeria. The operations of multinational oil companies have brought both development and challenges such as shaping local politics, fueling conflicts over land ownership and creating environmental and ecological issues that affect fishing and farming livelihoods.

== Tourism ==
The Ibeno Beach is a major tourism destination in Akwa Ibom State and, an emerging destination in Nigeria.

The Ibeno Beach, stretching over 45 kilometres (28 mi), is recognized as the longest beach in West Africa. It serves as both a natural wonder and a major tourist attraction, drawing visitors to its scenic beauty, cultural festivals, and recreational activities.

== Culture ==
Ibeno people are rich in cultural heritage. The people have many age-long traditional institutions like Ekpe, Obon, Uke, Ekong, Akata, Eka-Ebitu, Umom Isong, Oluo, Ikini and the age-grade system (Nka) which is highly recognized and practiced in Ibeno.

== People ==
Ibeno people are ancestrally related to the Andoni people and Oron people in origin. The common dialect of Ibeno people is the Ibeno language, prominently spoken by Ibeno and Eastern Obolo people in Akwa Ibom State. The people also enjoy an active aquatic life.

== Population ==
Males	Females	Total
41,311	34,069	75,380
* Source: 2006 National Census

== Political wards ==
Wards	Ward centers
Ibeno 1	Central Sch., Ukpenekang
Ibeno 2	Town Hall, Ikot Inwang
Ibeno 3	Primary School, Mkpanak
Ibeno 4	Primary School, Okpolom
Ibeno 5	Primary School, Inua Eyet Ikot
Ibeno 6	Primary School, Okoro Utip
Ibeno 7	Govt. School, Iwoachang
Ibeno 8	Primary School, Atafre
Ibeno 9	Primary School, Okposo I
Ibeno 10	Primary School, Ndito Eka Iba
