= Udoma Udo Udoma =

Nigerian politician

Senator Udoma Udo Udoma CON
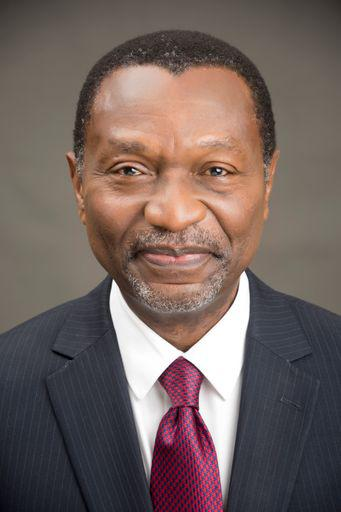
- Udo Udoma in 2020

Minister of Budget and Economic Planning
- In office November 2015 – May 2019
- President: Muhammadu Buhari
- Preceded by: Abubakar Suleiman
- Succeeded by: Atiku Bagudu

Personal details
- Born: Udoma Udo Udoma; 26 February 1954 (age 72) Akwa-Ibom State, Nigeria
- Citizenship: Nigerian (1954–present)
- Education: Oxford University
- Occupation: Founding Partner, UUBO, Chairman - United Africa Company of Nigeria (2010 - 2015) & Union Bank of Nigeria(2013 - 2015)

Udoma Udo Udoma is a commercial lawyer and founder of the Nigeria law firm Udo Udoma & Belo-Osagie. His career spans law, business and politics, as he served as a senator in the Federal Republic of Nigeria from 1999 to 2007, as a Federal Minister from 2015 to 2019, and on the boards of various corporations in both the private and public sectors.

== Early life ==
Udoma Udo Udoma is an Ibibio man from Akwa Ibom State and son of Dr., Sir Egbert Udo Udoma. He was born on the 26th of February 1954 in Aba, Abia State, Nigeria, the 3rd of seven children to Sir Egbert Udo Udoma (former justice of the Nigerian Supreme Court and the first African Chief Justice of Uganda) and his wife, Lady Grace Udo Udoma (née Bassey). Sir Egbert Udo Udoma, an Ibibio man and an associate of Professor Eyo Ita was knighted by Queen Elizabeth II of the United Kingdom of Great Britain and Northern Ireland in 1964.

He attended Government School, Aba from 1959 to 1961 and Corona School Ikoyi, Lagos from 1962-1964, before joining his father – who had been appointed Chief Justice of Uganda in 1963 – to complete his primary education at Nakasero Primary School in Kampala, Uganda.

He returned to Nigeria to study at King’s College, Lagos, from 1966 to 1972 - before being accepted into Oxford University.

Udoma studied law at Oxford University’s St Catherine’s College and graduated with a B.A. (Law) degree in 1976 and obtained a post-graduate degree, the B.C.L. degree in Jurisprudence in 1977, before returning to Lagos, Nigeria to attend the country’s law school.

== Legal career ==
Udoma attended the Nigerian Law School, Victoria Island, Lagos and after having been awarded a B.L. degree, he was called to the Nigerian Bar in 1978.

As is the custom for Nigerian graduates, Udoma served his nation under the National Youth Service Corps (NYSC) - an initiative by the Nigerian government in the post-civil war era to provide young Nigerians with a unique opportunity to contribute to the development of local communities while spending a year in a state different from their own.

He was posted to Kano State, where he helped set up and organise a legal aid scheme.

== Udo Udoma & Belo-Osagie ==
Upon completing his NYSC, Udoma worked briefly as a law lecturer at the University of Lagos. After working as an Investment Analyst at Chase Merchant Bank (1980), then as an associate in the corporate law firm of Chris Ogunbanjo & Company (1980-1981), then as a partner in the corporate law firm of David Garrick & Company (1981-1983) – Udoma set up his own law firm Udo Udoma & Co. in 1983. The name was changed to Udo Udoma & Belo-Osagie when he took on his first partner, Harvard and University of Legon educated Dr. Myma Belo-Osagie.

Udo Udoma & Belo-Osagie has become one of Nigeria's largest corporate and commercial law firms. Celebrating its 40th year of operation in 2023, the firm has experienced substantial growth, now comprising 16 partners, 21 practice areas, a team of 67 lawyers, and over 45 business support staff. The firm is well-ranked by legal directory ranking bodies and is a recipient of numerous prestigious awards and recognitions.

During his legal career, Udoma specialised in company law, banking and finance, securities law, and capital market transactions. Although he retired from active legal practice in 2019, he continues to provide support to the firm, in an Of Counsel capacity.

== Public sector contributions ==
Udoma Udo Udoma has contributed to the public sector, often providing pro-bono services to the Federal Government, and some State Governments, offering legal expertise in the fields of crude oil, natural gas, and other natural resources law, as well as constitutional law.

He served for 2 years between 1982 and 1983 as a member of a group of consultants retained by the Nigerian Government to advise on the feasibility of establishing a liquified natural gas project in Nigeria. In 1984 he was appointed by the Federal Government as the legal member of the LNG Working Committee which was set up to facilitate a joint venture between the Nigerian National Petroleum Company, Royal Dutch Shell, Elf Aquitaine and Agip to establish an LNG project in Bonny Island, Rivers State, Nigeria. He held this part time position until 1989.

Between 1991 and 1993 he was the first Chairman of the Corporate Affairs Commission, building the foundation of the Commission, contributing to it becoming one of the most efficient Federal Government agencies.

He took leave of absence from his law firm between 1993 and 1994 to serve as Special Adviser to the Minister of Petroleum and Natural Resources.

In 1995, he was appointed as the legal member of a committee chaired by the economist, Dr. Pius Okigbo, which conducted a comprehensive review of the National Policy on Solid Minerals Development.

Udoma has made a number of other public service contributions. He served on a committee to review and advise on ways of strengthening the legal rules guiding the Technical Committee on Privatisation and Commercialisation (TCPC), which was charged with privatising and commercialising Federal Government-owned para-statals. In 1998, he was a member of the Technical Committee of the National Council of Nigerian Vision (Vision 2010).

In 2007, he chaired the Presidential Committee on Waivers, Incentives, and Concessions, which recommended the establishment of the Ministry of Trade & Investment to focus on generating investments. This recommendation has since been implemented.

From 2008 to 2012, Udoma served as the non-executive Chairman of the Nigerian Securities and Exchange Commission.

Between 2011 and 2012, he served as the Vice Chairman of the Presidential Committee for the Review of the Nigerian Constitution. In 2012, he chaired the Task Force established by the Federal Government to promote the passage of the Petroleum Industry Bill into law.

== Time as senator (1999–2007) ==
In 1999, Udoma was elected as Senator representing the Akwa Ibom South constituency. During his first term from 1999 to 2003, he served as Vice-Chairman of the Senate Foreign Affairs Committee and, subsequently, as Chairman of the Senate Appropriations Committee. He gained a second term from 2003 to 2007, during which he served as chairman of the Senate Committee of National Planning and Poverty Alleviation, before being elected as a principal officer as the Chief Whip of the Senate.

== Bill to remove the onshore/offshore dichotomy ==
During his first term, Udoma led the Senate Committee that proposed a bill to eliminate the distinction between onshore and offshore petroleum production when calculating state revenue based on the derivation principle. Although the bill received approval from both Houses of the National Assembly, the President withheld his signature. In his second term, the bill was reintroduced, and Udoma once again chaired the Committee responsible, and successfully ensured its passage. This time, the President agreed to sign it.

== Debt relief campaign ==
During his second term, Udoma headed the National Assembly Debt Relief Campaign team, which, in 2005, convinced Nigeria's creditor nations to support debt relief, acting together as the Paris Club.

== Stopping introduction of third term ==
Udoma was a leading voice in the campaign against the introduction of a constitutional amendment to allow the President and the State Governors to run for a third term in office. He explained his opposition to the third term proposal in an article published in several newspapers, such as Nigeria’s ThisDay newspaper

== Post-senate ==
In 2007, he did not seek a third term and returned to his law practice, in addition to accepting a number of board appointments. He served as Vice Chairman of Linkage Assurance Plc from 2007 to 2013; as a director in Unilever Nigeria Plc from 2008 to 2015; as Chairman of UAC of Nigeria Plc from 2010 to 2015; and as Chairman of Union Bank Plc from February 2013 to November 2015.

== Minister of budget and national planning ==
In 2015, Udoma stepped down from all his roles in the private sector upon accepting President Muhammadu Buhari's invitation to join his cabinet as the Minister of Budget and National Planning. In that capacity, he took primary responsibility for developing the Nigerian Economic Recovery and Growth Plan, the implementation of which helped take Nigeria out of recession. By the time he left office in May 2019 at the end of President Buhari’s first term, Nigeria’s GDP was growing at more than 2%.

== University engagements ==
After leaving office as a Minister in 2019, Udoma has remained committed to community and public service. Senator Udoma was appointed the Pro-Chancellor and Chairman of the Governing Council of Bayero University, Kano in 2021 and is currently the Pro-Chancellor and Chairman of the Governing Council of the Akwa Ibom State University, Ikot Akpaden, Akwa Ibom State.

== Other engagements ==
From 1989 to 1991 Udoma worked as a consultant with the New York based law firm, Shearman and Sterling. Working out of their office in Paris, France, he advised companies and governments in Europe, North Africa and the Middle East on financial, energy and investment law.

From 1996 to 1999 he was chairman of the Editorial Advisory Board of ThisDay Newspaper.

== Honours ==
Udoma Udo Udoma has been the recipient of several honours and awards. In 2005, he was recognised as the best Nigerian Senator of 2004 at the inaugural ThisDay Awards. The University of Uyo conferred upon him an honorary Doctor of Law degree (LLD) in 2011. He was awarded Commander of the Order of the Niger (CON) in November 2011.

In 2019, the Emperor of Japan awarded him 'The Order of the Rising Sun, Gold and Silver Star.' He is the first Nigerian to receive such recognition.

== Family ==
Udoma Udo Udoma is married to Sally Udoma (née Sikuade), and they have two daughters and a son.
