= Ata Idung Afaha Ekid =

- Village
- Interactive map of Ata Idung Afaha Ekid
- Country: Nigeria
- State: Akwa Ibom
- Local Government Area: Eket

Ata Idung Afaha is a village in Eket local government area of Akwa Ibom State, Nigeria.
