= Onna =

- LGA
- Interactive map of Onna
- Location in Nigeria
- Coordinates: 4°39′0″N 7°52′0″E
- Country: Nigeria
- State: Akwa Ibom State
- Capital: Abat

Government
  - Chairman: Joshua T. Ndoho

Area
  - Total: 47.41 km^{2} (18.31 sq mi)

Population (2022)
  - Total: 157,200
  - Density: 3,316/km^{2} (8,588/sq mi)
- Time zone: UTC+1 (WAT)

OnnaAudio is a Local Government Area in Akwa Ibom State, Nigeria. Its name comes from an acronym of the names of the four predominant clans in the area: Oniong, Nnung Ndem, Awa Afaha and Asuna Nung Oku. Onna has a population of about 295,000 people worldwide. Onna is bounded to the east by Eket, to the west by Mkpat Enin and to the south by the Atlantic Ocean. The people of Onna are mainly fishermen and farmers Everything being equal, Onna has a large number of seafood. Onna has hosted various oil company while search is ongoing for more oil discovery. Oil exploration is ongoing in communities such as Ukpana, Akpabom, Ikot Abasi, Ikwe etc all in Onna LGA .The local government is also home to a number of highly intellectual population who have made numerous impact in the community, nationwide and in the diasporas.

== Oil and gas industry ==
Onna is an oil and gas producing local government area.

== Political Wards ==
Wards	Ward Centers
Awa 1	Primary School, Awa Iman
Awa 2	Town Hall, Afaha Ubium
Awa 3	Primary School, Ikot Akpan Nkpe
Awa 4	Secondary School, Ikot Akpan Ishiet
Awa 5	Sec. Com. Sch., Ikot Etukudo
Awa 6	Town Hall, Ikot Mbong
Nung Ndem 1	Town Hall, Mkpok
Nung Ndem 2	Primary School, Ikot Ndua Iman
Oniong East 1	Onna People High School
Oniong East 2	Primary School, Ikot Ebekpo
Oniong East 3	Primary School, Ikwe
Oniong West 1	Primary School, Ikot Edor
Oniong West 2	Primary School, Ukpana
Oniong West 3	Secondary School, Ikot Ebiere
Oniong West 4	Primary School, Ikot Ndudot
