= Ede Urua =

- Village
- Interactive map of Ede Urua
- Country: Nigeria
- State: Akwa Ibom
- Local Government Area: Eket

Ede Urua is a village in Eket local government area of Akwa Ibom State in Nigeria.

The people of Ede Urua mostly engage in farming.
