= Effiong Dickson Bob =

Nigerian politician

Pro Chancellor and Chairman of the Governing Council, University of Benin
- Incumbent
- Assumed office 15 January 2013

Senator for Akwa Ibom North East
- In office 29 May 2003 – 29 May 2011
- Preceded by: John James Akpan Udo-Edehe
- Succeeded by: Ita Enang

Personal details
- Born: 1 October 1959 (age 66) Nsit Ubium LGA, Akwa Ibom State, Nigeria
- Spouse: Comfort Bob
- Children: 3

Effiong Dickson Bob (born 1 October 1959) from Ikot Ekwere, Ubium in Akwa Ibom State is the Pro Chancellor of the University of Benin. He was elected Senator for the Akwa Ibom North East Senatorial District of Akwa Ibom State, Nigeria. He took office on 29 May 2003, and was re-elected in 2007 and served till 2011. He is a member of the People's Democratic Party (PDP).

== Education ==
He was born in Nsit Ubium Local Government Area in the Etinan Federal Constituency of Akwa Ibom state on 1 October 1959.

He attended Government Primary School, Ikot Ekwere Ubium where he obtained a First Leaving School Certificate in 1971. From there he proceeded to Salvation Army Secondary School, Akai Ubium where he schooled from 1973 to 1977 after which he obtained the ordinary Level, West African School Certificate. He then attended the School of Arts and Science, Uyo where he was from 1977 to 1979 and finished with the GCE A Level.

He obtained a bachelor's degree (LLB) in Law from the University of Lagos. He thereafter attended the Nigerian Law School in Victoria Island, Lagos where he obtained the BL degree and was called to the Nigerian Bar in 1984.

== Career ==
=== Early career ===
Bob worked with the Land Allocation Advisory Committee, Ikot Ekpene as its pioneer secretary from 1979 to 1980 before proceeding to the university to study law. On graduation Bob took part in the Nigerian Youth Service Corps (NYSC), and served for one year with Chief A. A. Oguntuwashe's Chambers in Ado Ekiti. After service he went on to work with G. A. Ikott & Co. Legal practitioners, Eket from 1985 to 1987.

=== Political career ===
Bob had always had an interest in law from the perspective of benefiting those who could not speak for themselves. This passion drove him into the political space where he began as a Councilor. He was Councilor for Works And Transport in the Nsit Ubium Local Government Area in 1990, and then was elected to the Akwa Ibom State House of Assembly (1992–1993) and was appointed Deputy Speaker. While in the State House of Assembly he served at different times in the House Committees on Public Accounts, Industries and Human Rights and Public Petitions.

Bob was Chairman of the Nsit Ubium LGA from 1996 to 1997. He was appointed Attorney General and Commissioner for Justice in Akwa Ibom State (1999–2002).

On Nigeria's return to democracy, Bob was appointed by the Victor Attah led government of Akwa Ibom State as Attorney General and Commissioner of Justice and served a term of four years. During his time as Attorney General he served as Member, Akwa Ibom State Judicial Commission; Director, Anchor Insurance Company Ltd; and Director, Akwa Ibom Savings and Loans Ltd.

=== Senate career ===
Bob was elected Senator for the Akwa Ibom North East constituency in April 2003 on the PDP platform, and was reelected in April 2007. After taking his seat in the Senate in June 2007, Bob was appointed, at various times over his double tenure, as chairman to committees on Senate Services, Finance, Culture and Tourism, Power and Steel, and Local and Foreign Debts. He also served as chairman, Ad hoc Committee on Investigating illegal Withdrawals From the Excess Crude Fund Without Authorization from the National Assembly. He also was a member of the delegation that witnessed the signing of the final exit of the Paris Club Debt in Paris, France. Other committees he served on as member included: Committees on Appropriations, Air Force, Communications, Education, Privatization, Establishment and Public Services, Foreign Affairs, Christians Pilgrims Committee, and Committee on Information.

During his tenure as Senator he also served as Member representing Nigeria in the ECOWAS Parliament. He also was the Chairman of the National Assembly Caucus, Akwa Ibom State comprising all the Senators and House of Representative Members from the State. He was a member of the South South Caucus in the Senate and a Member of the South Senators Forum.

In a mid-term evaluation of Senators in May 2009, a national daily newspaper, ThisDay, noted that Bob had sponsored bills on amendment to the Energy Commission Act, Public Officers (Review of Cases) Panel, Fire Service (Inspection on Building), an Act to Prohibit Trading in Federal Highways in Nigeria and an Act to Prohibit Touting in Public Places.

=== Post Senate career ===
In 2011, Bob published a book titled Independence of the Legislature in Nigeria: Matters Arising. He was appointed by the President Goodluck Jonathan led government as the pro-chancellor and Chairman Governing Council of the University of Benin, Benin City. The governing board which was constituted by the federal Government on January 15, 2013, also had as member, Jamila Salik, J K Gazama, SAN and Shettima Muhammed Saleh.

=== Professional career ===
Bob became a member of the Nigerian Bar Association in 1984. He served in law chambers as a Youth Corper, on completion of his national youth service and later on established a law firm, Effiong Bob and Associates.

During his time as Attorney General, in Akwa Ibom State from 1999 to 2002, he served as a member of the Council of Legal Education (Nigerian Law School).

He was a Member of the Committee on Recruitment and Discipline (Nigerian Law School), of the Member Body of Attorneys General in the Federation, of the Body of Benchers, of the Akwa Ibom State Judicial Commission, and is a Member of the National Executive Committee of the Nigerian Bar Association.

== Family and business ==
He is married with three children. He is the chairman (and his wife is CEO) of the Leenford Group of Companies Limited, a Nigerian company involved in businesses ranging from mining to hospitality.
