= Eket language =

Language

Ekid
- Native to: Nigeria
- Region: Akwa Ibom State
- Native speakers: 400,000 (2020)
- Language family: Niger–Congo?: Atlantic–Congo; Benue–Congo; Cross River; Lower Cross; Ibibio-Efik; Ekid

Language codes
- ISO 639-3: Either: eke – Ekit etb – Etebi
- Glottolog: ekit1245
- ELP: Ekit
- Etebi

Ekid (Esit Eket and Eket) is sub Ibibio-Efik language of Nigeria.

The Ekid language belongs to the lower Cross River branch of Benue-Congo languages and is closely related to ibibio varieties. It originated from proto-forms associated with ancient migration of speakers from the Cameroon highlands into the Cross River basin. Linguistics evidence suggests these movements were part of broader Ibibio expansion, with group like the Afaha settling in Eket areas after crossing from Usak Edet(modern Isangele in Cameroon) southward into present-day Akwa Ibom State, where they established fishing and farming communities amid dense forest.These migrations occurring in waves driven by environmental pressures, conflicts and resources quests unfolded gradually from pre-15th-century periods, fostering linguistics continuity through shared totems, deities and genealogies.
