= 2023 Nigerian Senate elections in Akwa Ibom State =

2023 Senate elections in Akwa Ibom

- 25 February 2023

All 3 Akwa Ibom State seats in the Senate of Nigeria
	Majority party	Minority party
Party	PDP	YPP
Last election	2 (Note: The North-West District's election was partially voided and a supplementary election called. Although the PDP retained the seat in the supplementary election, it was held in 2020 so the party's 2019 total is 2 seats.)	0
Seats before	2	1
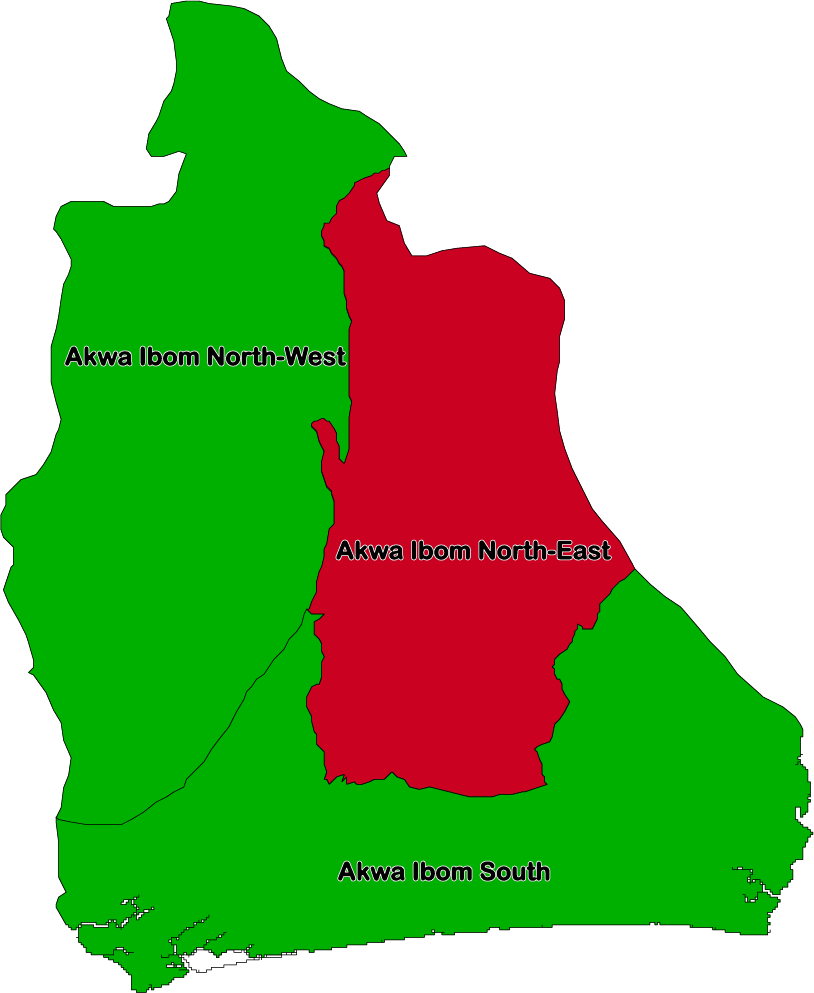
- PDP incumbent retiring YPP incumbent retiring

The 2023 Nigerian Senate elections in Akwa Ibom State will be held on 25 February 2023, to elect the 3 federal Senators from Akwa Ibom State, one from each of the state's three senatorial districts. The elections will coincide with the 2023 presidential election, as well as other elections to the Senate and elections to the House of Representatives; with state elections being held two weeks later. Primaries were held between 4 April and 9 June 2022.

== Background ==
The previous Senate elections, only one of the three incumbent senators were returned, with North-East District Senator Bassey Albert Akpan (PDP) being re-elected whilst both PDP-turned-APC senators (the North-West District's Godswill Akpabio and the South District's Nelson Effiong) were defeated in their re-election bids. In the North-East district, Akpan held his seat for the PDP with 70% of the vote; in the APC-held seats, the PDP's Chris Ekpenyong and Akon Eyakenyi won with 58% in the North-West district and 73% in the South district, respectively. Although the North-West result was later partially voided and a supplementary election called, Akpabio declined to contest the race and Ekpenyong was easily returned to the election. These results were a part of a reassertion of PDP dominance in the state with Akpabio and his allies losing; the party also won every House of Representatives seat and retained control of the House of Assembly. The PDP presidential nominee, Atiku Abubakar, also won the state easily with about 68% and Governor Udom Gabriel Emmanuel was re-elected with nearly 75% of the vote in the gubernatorial election.

In the first half the 2019–2023 term, Ekpenyong and Eyakenyi were noted for only having a single bill each while Akpan sponsored nine bills. During the second half of the term, Akpan gained publicity due to his continued trial for fraud charges and his defection to the YPP in July 2022.

== Overview ==
Affiliation	Party			Total
Affiliation	PDP	YPP	APC	Total
Previous Election	2	0	0	3
Before Election	2	1	0	3
After Election	2	0	1	3

== Summary ==
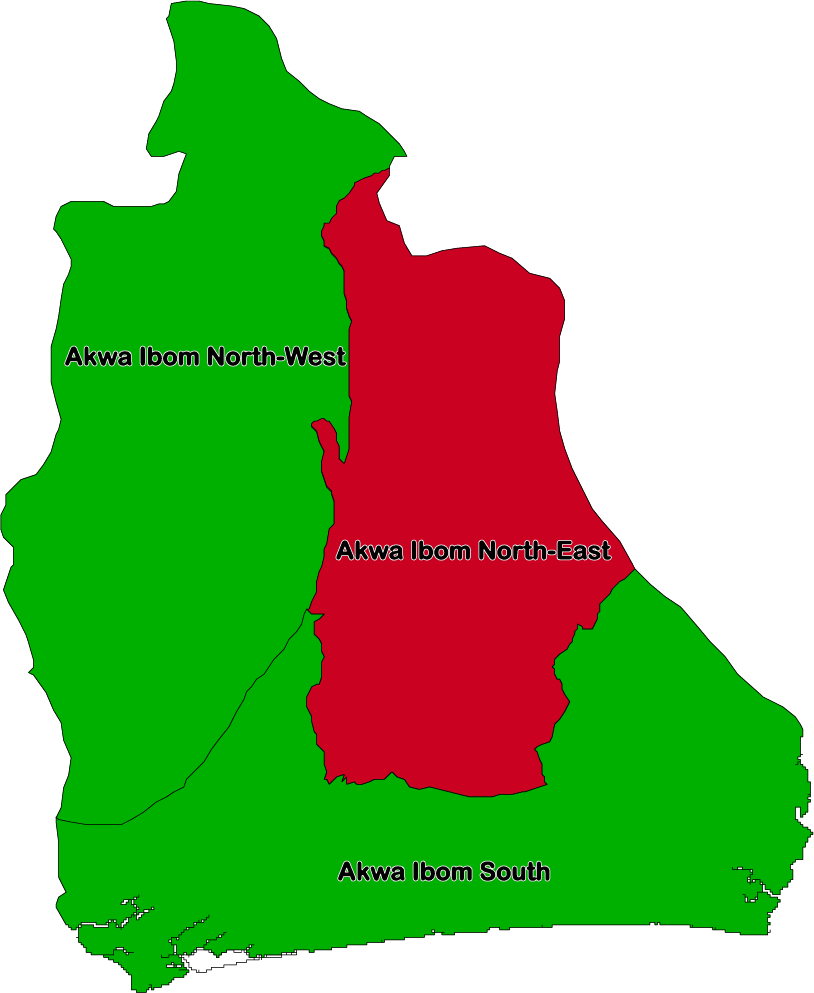
PDP incumbent retiring YPP incumbent retiring

District	Incumbent		Results	
District	Incumbent	Party	Status	Candidates
Akwa Ibom North-East	Bassey Albert Akpan	YPP (Note: This senator was elected as a member of the PDP but switched to the YPP during their term.)	Incumbent retired New member elected PDP gain	▌Ndem Ndem (APC); ▌ ✓ Aniekan Bassey (PDP)
Akwa Ibom North-West	Chris Ekpenyong	PDP	Incumbent retired New member elected APC gain	▌ ✓ Godswill Akpabio (APC); ▌Emmanuel Enoidem (PDP)
Akwa Ibom South	Akon Eyakenyi	PDP	Incumbent retired New member elected PDP hold	▌Martins Udo-Inyang (APC); ▌ ✓ Ekong Sampson (PDP)

== Akwa Ibom North-East ==
2023 Akwa Ibom North-East Senatorial District election
- 25 February 2023
Nominee	Emaeyak Ukpong	Aniekan Bassey
Party	APC	PDP
Senator before election
Bassey Albert Akpan
YPP
Elected Senator
To be determined
To be determined

The Akwa Ibom North-East Senatorial District covers the local government areas of Etinan, Ibesikpo Asutan, Ibiono-Ibom, Itu, Nsit-Atai, Nsit-Ibom, Nsit-Ubium, Uruan, and Uyo. The district is centered around the city of Uyo and is sometimes referred to as the "Uyo Senatorial District." The incumbent is Bassey Albert Akpan (YPP), who was elected with 70.4% of the vote in 2019 as a member of the PDP. In March 2022, Akpan announced that he would run for governor of Akwa Ibom State, instead of seeking re-election. However, Akpan withdrew on the date of the PDP gubernatorial primary in May 2022. Two months later, he joined the YPP to become its gubernatorial nominee.

=== Primary elections ===
==== All Progressives Congress ====
On 20 April 2022, the APC National Executive Committee announced the party's schedule for senatorial primaries, setting its expression of interest form price at ₦3 million and nomination form price at ₦17 million with a 50% discount for candidates younger than 40 while women and candidates with disabilities get free nomination forms. Forms were to be sold from 26 April to 6 May until the deadline was later extended to 10 May then 12 May. After the submission of nomination forms by 13 May, candidates were screened by a party committee on 14 and 15 May while 18 May was the date for the screening appeal process. Ward congresses and LGA congresses were set for 16 and 17 May to elect delegates for the primary. Candidates approved by the screening process advanced to a primary set for 27 May, in concurrence with other APC senatorial primaries; challenges to the result could be made on 28 May.

On the primary date, two candidates contested an indirect primary in Uyo that ended with Ndem Ndem emerging as the nominee after results showed him defeating Emmanuel Ekpenyong by a 18% margin. However, as in other Senate and House of Representatives primaries, state party leadership plotted to substitute in a different person—Emaeyak Ukpong—as party nominee; Ukpong's name was submitted to INEC but the commission had previously rejected the substitution plot. However, by the time the final nominee list was released, Emaeyak Ukpong was provisionally recognized as the nominee.

Original primary results

APC primary results
Party	Candidate	Votes	%
APC	Ndem Ndem	237	58.81%
APC	Emmanuel Ekpenyong	166	41.19%
Total votes		403	100.00%

==== People's Democratic Party ====
On 16 March 2022, the national PDP announced its senatorial primary timetable, setting its expression of interest form price at ₦1 million and the nomination form price at ₦20 million with a 50% discount for candidates between 25 and 30. Forms were to be sold until 1 April but the party later extended the deadline four times before reaching a final deadline of 22 April. After the submission of nomination forms by 25 April, candidates were screened by a party committee on 27 April while 2 May was the rescheduled date for the screening appeal process. Ward congresses were set for 29 April and LGA congresses were rescheduled for 10 May to elect delegates for the primary. Candidates approved by the screening process advanced to a primary set for 23 May, in concurrence with other PDP senatorial primaries but due to often violently enforced Monday stay-at-home orders by separatists, southeastern state parties held their primaries on 24 May; challenges to the result could be made on 25 May.

On the primary date, an indirect primary resulted in the victory of Aniekan Bassey—the Speaker of the Akwa Ibom State House of Assembly and MHA for Uruan. Bassey beat first runner-up Uwem Ita Etuk, the former Chairman of the Board of the Akwa Ibom Water Company who had withdrawn prior to the exercise, by a 90% margin.

PDP primary results
Party	Candidate	Votes	%
PDP	Aniekan Bassey	272	95.10%
PDP	Uwem Ita Etuk (withdrawn)	13	4.55%
PDP	Usenobong Akpabio (withdrawn)	1	0.35%
Total votes		286	100.00%

=== General election ===
==== Results ====
2023 Akwa Ibom North-East Senatorial District election
Party	Candidate	Votes	%
A	Ime Edem Hosanna Ndem		
AA	Calistus Andem		
ADP	Ubong Emmanuel Ekong		
AAC	Victor Amaitem Udofia		
ADC	Victoria Ibokette		
APC	Emaeyak Ukpong		
APGA	Essien Bassey Edet		
APM	Jumbo Oto-obong Daniel		
LP	Leo Enobong Ekpenyong		
NRM	Eseme Bassey Ekong		
New Nigeria Peoples Party	Etim Umoren Sunday		
PDP	Aniekan Bassey		
SDP	Nkereuwem Sunda Ekpe		
YPP	Usenobong Akpabio		
ZLP	Nnamonso Ituen Umoh		
Total votes			100.00%
Invalid or blank votes			N/A
Turnout			

== Akwa Ibom North-West ==
2023 Akwa Ibom North-West Senatorial District election
- 25 February 2023
Nominee	Godswill Akpabio	Emmanuel Enoidem
Party	APC	PDP
Senator before election
Chris Ekpenyong
PDP
Elected Senator
To be determined
To be determined

The Akwa Ibom North-West district covers the local government areas of Abak, Essien Udim, Etim Ekpo, Ika, Ikono, Ikot Ekpene, Ini, Obot-Akara, Oruk Anam, and Ukanafun. The district is centered around the city of Ikot Ekpene and is sometimes referred to as the "Ikot Ekpene Senatorial District;" it is also noted for its ethnic Anaang majority. The incumbent is Chris Ekpenyong (PDP), who was first elected with 58.4% of the vote in 2019 before being removed and later winning the supplementary election in January 2020, opted not to seek re-election.

=== Primary elections ===
==== All Progressives Congress ====
On 20 April 2022, the APC National Executive Committee announced the party's schedule for senatorial primaries, setting its expression of interest form price at ₦3 million and nomination form price at ₦17 million with a 50% discount for candidates younger than 40 while women and candidates with disabilities get free nomination forms. Forms were to be sold from 26 April to 6 May until the deadline was later extended to 10 May then 12 May. After the submission of nomination forms by 13 May, candidates were screened by a party committee on 14 and 15 May while 18 May was the date for the screening appeal process. Ward congresses and LGA congresses were set for 16 and 17 May to elect delegates for the primary. Candidates approved by the screening process advanced to a primary set for 27 May, in concurrence with other APC senatorial primaries; challenges to the result could be made on 28 May.

On the primary date, three candidates contested an indirect primary of the INEC-recognised Udo-Edehe-aligned faction in Ikot Ekpene that ended with Udom Ekpoudom—a former Deputy Inspector General of Police—emerging as the nominee after results showed him defeating Joseph Akpan and former MHR Ekperikpe Ekpo by a wide margin; Ekpoudom thanked APC delegates in his acceptance speech before promising quality representation if elected to the Senate. The Akpabio-faction held a parallel primary in which Ekpo won but it was not recognized by INEC. As in other APC Senate and House of Representatives primaries, Akpabio's faction (in control of the state party) plotted to substitute in a different person—former Governor, former Senator, and former Minister Godswill Akpabio himself—as party nominee. After trying to nullify the original primary then holding a new election on 10 June that Akpabio won, state party leadership submitted Akpabio's name as the nominee; however, INEC never recognised the legitimacy of the Akpabio factional leadership due to its questionable electoral origins and thus rejected the list. In response, both Ekpoudom and Akpabio approached the courts with Ekpoudom attempting to force the state APC to submit his name to INEC and Akpabio trying to force INEC to accept his candidacy. Akpabio's lawsuit emerged successful in September as a court ordered INEC to list him as nominee.

Original primary results

APC primary results
Party	Candidate	Votes	%
APC	Udom Ekpoudom	338	95.48%
APC	Joseph Akpan	12	3.39%
APC	Ekperikpe Ekpo	4	1.13%
Total votes		354	100.00%

==== People's Democratic Party ====
On 16 March 2022, the national PDP announced its senatorial primary timetable, setting its expression of interest form price at ₦1 million and the nomination form price at ₦20 million with a 50% discount for candidates between 25 and 30. Forms were to be sold until 1 April but the party later extended the deadline four times before reaching a final deadline of 22 April. After the submission of nomination forms by 25 April, candidates were screened by a party committee on 27 April while 2 May was the rescheduled date for the screening appeal process. Ward congresses were set for 29 April and LGA congresses were rescheduled for 10 May to elect delegates for the primary. Candidates approved by the screening process advanced to a primary set for 23 May, in concurrence with other PDP senatorial primaries but due to often violently enforced Monday stay-at-home orders by separatists, southeastern state parties held their primaries on 24 May; challenges to the result could be made on 25 May.

On the primary date, screened candidates contested an indirect primary at the Ikot Ekpene Township Stadium that ended with former PDP National Legal Adviser Emmanuel Enoidem's victory as none of his opponents received any votes.

PDP primary results
Party	Candidate	Votes	%
PDP	Emmanuel Enoidem	329	100.00%
PDP	Other candidates	0	0.00%
Total votes		329	100.00%

=== General election ===
==== Results ====
2023 Akwa Ibom North-West Senatorial District election
Party	Candidate	Votes	%
A	Martins Inyang		
AA	Etiuwem Nnamnso Eshiet		
ADP	Thursday Tim Akpan		
AAC	Ubong Hanson Mbat		
ADC	Raphael Edwin Amos		
APC	Godswill Akpabio		
APGA	Augustine Akpaetor		
LP	Okpongete Nseobong Nseobong		
NRM	Akamimo Fidelis Udonkang		
New Nigeria Peoples Party	Dominic Ayong		
PDP	Emmanuel Enoidem		
SDP	Gogwin Etim Udo		
YPP	Emmanuel Bartholomew Ekon		
ZLP	Udo Bassey Ebienang		
Total votes			100.00%
Invalid or blank votes			N/A
Turnout			

== Akwa Ibom South ==
2023 Akwa Ibom South Senatorial District election
- 25 February 2023
Nominee	Martins Udo-Inyang	Ekong Sampson
Party	APC	PDP
Senator before election
Akon Eyakenyi
PDP
Elected Senator
To be determined
To be determined

The Akwa Ibom South district covers the local government areas of Eastern Obolo, Eket, Esit Eket, Ibeno, Ikot-Abasi, Mbo, Mkpat-Enin, Okobo, Onna, Oron, Udung-Uko, and Urue-Offong/Oruko. The district is centered around the city of Eket and is sometimes referred to as the "Eket Senatorial District;" it is also noted for its ethnic Oron majority. The incumbent is Akon Eyakenyi (PDP), who was elected with 73.2% of the vote in 2019, did not run for re-election and later became the PDP deputy gubernatorial nominee.

=== Primary elections ===
==== All Progressives Congress ====
On 20 April 2022, the APC National Executive Committee announced the party's schedule for senatorial primaries, setting its expression of interest form price at ₦3 million and nomination form price at ₦17 million with a 50% discount for candidates younger than 40 while women and candidates with disabilities get free nomination forms. Forms were to be sold from 26 April to 6 May until the deadline was later extended to 10 May then 12 May. After the submission of nomination forms by 13 May, candidates were screened by a party committee on 14 and 15 May while 18 May was the date for the screening appeal process. Ward congresses and LGA congresses were set for 16 and 17 May to elect delegates for the primary. Candidates approved by the screening process advanced to a primary set for 27 May, in concurrence with other APC senatorial primaries; challenges to the result could be made on 28 May.

On the primary date, the INEC monitoring team reported the non-conduct of the APC primary. The Akpabio faction of the APC submitted former commissioner Martins Udo-Inyang's name to INEC but, like other names submitted by the faction, it was initially rejected. However, by the time the final nominee list was released in October, Udo-Inyang was provisionally recognized as the nominee.

==== People's Democratic Party ====
On 16 March 2022, the national PDP announced its senatorial primary timetable, setting its expression of interest form price at ₦1 million and the nomination form price at ₦20 million with a 50% discount for candidates between 25 and 30. Forms were to be sold until 1 April but the party later extended the deadline four times before reaching a final deadline of 22 April. After the submission of nomination forms by 25 April, candidates were screened by a party committee on 27 April while 2 May was the rescheduled date for the screening appeal process. Ward congresses were set for 29 April and LGA congresses were rescheduled for 10 May to elect delegates for the primary. Candidates approved by the screening process advanced to a primary set for 23 May, in concurrence with other PDP senatorial primaries but due to often violently enforced Monday stay-at-home orders by separatists, southeastern state parties held their primaries on 24 May; challenges to the result could be made on 25 May.

On the primary date, four candidates contested an indirect primary in Onna that resulted in former commissioner Ekong Sampson emerging as the nominee after results showed him defeating MHRs Francis Uduyok and Patrick Ifon by a wide margin.

PDP primary results
Party	Candidate	Votes	%
PDP	Ekong Sampson	367	96.83%
PDP	Francis Uduyok	11	2.90%
PDP	Patrick Ifon	1	0.26%
PDP	Akparawa Ephraim Inyang-eyen	0	0%
Total votes		379	100.00%
Invalid or blank votes		3	N/A
Turnout		382	100.00%

=== Campaign ===
In November, as the election neared, Sampson and YPP nominee Akparawa Ephraim Inyang-Eyen entered into a public spat over the validity of zoning in the senatorial seat. Sampson accused Inyang-Eyen of self-centeredly disregarding the district's history of zoning while Inyang-Eyen contended that there was no zoning in the seat.

=== General election ===
==== Results ====
2023 Akwa Ibom South Senatorial District election
Party	Candidate	Votes	%
A	Esther Arthur Ugana		
AA	Umoh Blessing Umoh		
ADP	Bassy Monday Bassy		
ADC	Victor Umoh Okon		
APC	Martins Udo-Inyang		
LP	Dominic Ubong Essien		
NRM	Duff Nse Akwaowo		
New Nigeria Peoples Party	Ekereobong Udo Afia		
PDP	Ekong Sampson		
SDP	Moses Aniefiok Edoho		
YPP	Akparawa Ephraim Inyang-Eyen		
ZLP	Blessing Oko Umo		
Total votes			100.00%
Invalid or blank votes			N/A
Turnout			

== See also ==
- 2023 Nigerian Senate election
- 2023 Nigerian elections
