= 2023 Akwa Ibom State gubernatorial election =

2023 gubernatorial election in Akwa Ibom State, Nigeria

- 18 March 2023
- Registered: 2,357,418
Nominee	Umo Eno	Bassey Albert Akpan	Akanimo Udofia
Party	PDP	YPP	APC
Running mate	Akon Eyakenyi	Asuquo Amba	Victor Antai
Popular vote	354,348	136,262	129,602
Percentage	55.02%	21.16%	20.12%
Governor before election
Udom Gabriel Emmanuel
PDP
Elected Governor
Umo Eno
PDP

The 2023 Akwa Ibom State gubernatorial election took place on 18 March 2023, to elect the Governor of Akwa Ibom State, concurrent with elections to the Akwa Ibom State House of Assembly as well as twenty-seven other gubernatorial elections and elections to all other state houses of assembly. The election—which was postponed from its original 11 March date — was held three weeks after the presidential election and National Assembly elections. Incumbent PDP Governor Udom Gabriel Emmanuel was term-limited and could not seek re-election to a third term. Former commissioner Umo Eno held the office for the PDP by a 34% margin over first runner-up and YPP nominee — Senator Bassey Albert Akpan.

Party primaries were scheduled for between 4 April and 9 June 2022 with the Peoples Democratic Party nominating Eno on 25 May while the All Progressives Congress nominated businessman Akanimo Udofia on 26 May in a controversial process that was initially not recognized by INEC; Udofia was only recognized after a Supreme Court ruling on 7 March 2023. As the APC was unable to overturn the INEC decision until days to the election, the nominees of smaller parties became major contenders like former Senator John James Akpan Udo-Edehe (New Nigeria Peoples Party) and Senator Bassey Albert Akpan (Young Progressives Party).

The day after the election, collation completed and INEC declared Eno as the victor. In total, Eno obtained over 354,000 votes and 55% of the vote as runner-up Akpan received around 136,000 votes and 21% of the vote while Udofia came third with nearly 130,000 votes and 20% of the vote.

== Electoral system ==
The Governor of Akwa Ibom State is elected using a modified two-round system. To be elected in the first round, a candidate must receive the plurality of the vote and over 25% of the vote in at least two-thirds of state local government areas. If no candidate passes this threshold, a second round will be held between the top candidate and the next candidate to have received a plurality of votes in the highest number of local government areas.

== Background ==
Akwa Ibom State is a small state in the South South mainly populated by Efik-Ibibio peoples; although its oil reserves make it one of the most wealthy states in the nation, Akwa Ibom has faced challenges in security, environmental degradation, and lack of affordable housing in large part due to years of systemic corruption.

Politically, the state's 2019 elections were categorized as a reassertion of the PDP's dominance after Senator Godswill Akpabio and his allies that switched to the APC lost. Statewise, Emmanuel easily won re-election with nearly 75% of the vote and 25 of 26 House of Assembly seats were won by the PDP. The PDP was also successful federally, unseating all APC senators and house members to sweep all three senate and ten House of Representatives seats as the state was easily won by PDP presidential nominee Atiku Abubakar with about 68% but still swung towards the APC and had lower turnout.

During Emmanuel's second term, his administration stated focuses included the completion of the Ibom Deep Seaport, Ibom Air, further industrialisation, and upgrading transportation infrastructure; however, he was routinely criticized for authoritarian-esque responses to critics and journalists. Alarms were raised most notably after the arrest of a critical banker, the threatened demolition of a critic's church, and the barring of journalists from state government events. At other points during his administration, Emmanuel was criticized for a poor response to the COVID-19 pandemic by dismissing the state's chief epidemiologist after he refused to suppress testing, his administration's systemic budget misappropriation and perceived corruption, his unconstitutional declaration of Akwa Ibom as a Christian state and state construction of a Christian worship centre, and the Seaport's proposed location. On the other hand, he was praised for expanding Ibom Air, sports development, and a relatively low crime rate.

== Primary elections ==
The primaries, along with any potential challenges to primary results, were to take place between 4 April and 3 June 2022 but the deadline was extended to 9 June. An informal zoning gentlemen's agreement sets the Akwa Ibom North-East Senatorial District to have the next governor as Akwa Ibom North-East has not held the governorship since 2007. While no major party has yet closed their primaries to non-Northeast candidates, nearly all potential candidates are from the North-East and it appears as if major parties are holding to the zoning agreement.

=== All Progressives Congress ===
The year prior to the APC primaries was beset by party infighting between three factions each supported by former Governor and Minister Godswill Akpabio, former Senator and potential gubernatorial candidate John James Akpan Udo-Edehe, or former Senator and fellow potential gubernatorial candidate Ita Enang which culminated in three parallel party congresses in October 2021. As Udo-Edehe was a member of national APC leadership at the time, his faction was recognized by the national party in February 2022 but was later removed by a court decision in favour of Akpabio's faction. The court ruling came after Udo-Edehe left his role as Caretaker National Secretary, thus he was unable to stop newly elected National Chairman, Abdullahi Adamu, from swearing in Akpabio's faction; however, Akpan Udo-Edehe's faction received a court order telling parties to maintain the status quo and reporting later showed that Akpabio's faction had forged documents to convince the court to rule in its favour. In wake of the reports, the party factionalized as Akpabio's faction and Udo-Edehe's faction opened separate headquarters and each claimed to be the legitimate party structure as the national party recognized Akpabio's faction while Udo-Edehe's faction was recognized by INEC.

On 20 April 2022, the APC National Executive Committee announced the party's schedule for gubernatorial primaries, setting its expression of interest form price at ₦10 million and nomination form price at ₦40 million with a 50% nomination form discount for candidates younger than 40 while women and candidates with disabilities get free nomination forms. Forms were to be sold from 26 April to 6 May until the deadline was later extended to 10 May then 12 May. After the submission of nomination forms by 13 May, candidates were screened by a party committee on 14 and 15 May while 16 May was the date for the screening appeal process. Ward congresses and LGA congresses were set for between 7 and 9 May to elect delegates for the primary. Candidates approved by the screening process advanced to a primary set for 26 May, in concurrence with other APC gubernatorial primaries; challenges to the result could be made the next day.

On the date of the primary, the party crisis escalated as both factions attempted to hold their own primaries with nation party observers at the Akpabio faction primary on Ekpo Obot Street in Uyo while the state Commissioner of Police and State Resident Electoral Commissioner were at the Udo-Edehe faction primary in the Sheergrace Arena. Supporters of the two faction then spent the day fighting over control of official voting materials, delaying the exercise until early the next morning. Eventually, the Akpabio faction conducted its primary with businessman Akanimo Udofia easily winning but as other candidates rejected the process and analysts noted that the primary's legitimacy was questionable due to the lack of INEC observers. Losing out, Udo-Edehe protested the event before leaving the party to obtain the NNPP gubernatorial nomination while Enang asked a court to nullify the results.

By mid-June, it was revealed that the INEC Resident Electoral Commissioner Mike Igini's report listed that no legitimate primary took place for the state All Progressives Congress. In response, Akpabio allies attempted to discredit Igini but the REC was supported by the national commission, which confirmed the report. However, Udofia initiated litigation that culminated in a Supreme Court ruling in early March 2023 that ordered INEC to recognize Udofia as the legitimate nominee; the commission complied a few days later.

==== Nominated ====
- Akanimo Udofia: businessman

==== Eliminated in primary ====
- Richard Anana
- Ita Enang: former aide to President Muhammadu Buhari (2015–2022), former Senator for Akwa Ibom North-East (2011–2015), and former House of Representatives member for Itu/Ibiono Ibom (1999–2011)
- Larry Esin: 2007 PDP gubernatorial candidate
- Uduak Udo
- John James Akpan Udo-Edehe: APC Caretaker Committee National Secretary (2020–2022), former Minister of State for the Federal Capital Territory (2007–2008), and former Senator for Akwa Ibom North-East (1999–2003) (defected after the primary to successfully run in the NNPP gubernatorial primary)
- Austin Utuk: businessman

==== Results ====
Candidates' vote share
1. Akanimo Udofia (94.8%)
2. Other candidates (5.18%)

APC primary results
Party	Candidate	Votes	%
APC	Akanimo Udofia	1,227	94.82%
APC	Ita Enang	34	2.63%
APC	Chris Ekong	21	1.62%
APC	Uduak Udo	7	0.54%
APC	Richard Anana	2	0.15%
APC	John James Akpan Udo-Edehe	2	0.15%
APC	Larry Esin	1	0.08%
APC	Austin Utuk	0	0.00%
Total votes		1,294	100.00
Invalid or blank votes		19	N/A
Turnout		1,313	Unknown

=== People's Democratic Party ===
In January 2022, former Governor Victor Attah announced that candidate Umo Eno was outgoing Governor Udom Gabriel Emmanuel's endorsed candidate much to the chagrin of opposing PDP members who raised fears over potential imposition. Emmanuel defended the endorsement, saying that it was in the best interest of the state and state party chairman Aniekan Akpan also backed Eno. Further criticism emerged when reports that Eno had forged court documents to illegally arrest striking workers resurfaced in February.

On 16 March 2022, the national PDP announced its gubernatorial primaries' schedule, setting its expression of interest form price at ₦1 million and the nomination form price at ₦20 million with a 50% discount for candidates between 25 and 30. Forms were to be sold until 1 April but the party later extended the deadline four times before reaching a final deadline of 22 April. After the submission of nomination forms by 25 April, candidates were screened by a party committee on 28 April while 2 May was the rescheduled date for the screening appeal process. Ward congresses were set for 29 April and LGA congresses were rescheduled for 10 May to elect delegates for the primary. Candidates approved by the screening process advanced to a primary set for 25 May, in concurrence with all other PDP gubernatorial primaries; challenges to the result could be made in the following days.

Ahead of primary day, further claims of manipulation were tabled against Eno supporters leading Emmanuel to swiftly announce that there would be a post-primary reconciliation process. However, the announcement did not halt outcry as some candidates withdrew in protest on primary day including Senator Bassey Albert Akpan and House member Onofiok Luke while House member Michael Enyong held his own parallel primary at the Ewet Housing Estate. When the primary was held at the Godswill Akpabio International Stadium, Eno won the nomination after announced results showed him winning over 97% of the delegates' votes. After the primary, the state PDP set up a reconciliation committee to unify the party; however, issues for Ono emerged by July when Akpan defected to become the YPP gubernatorial nominee while another former opponent—Akan Okon—approached the judiciary to disqualify Ono based on claims of educational certificate forgery. Although Eno initially labeled the court case as a political stunt, the West African Examinations Council confirmed that the certificates Eno submitted to INEC did not match documents in the organisation's records. In response, Eno's representatives changed his court defense and Eno publicly vowed to leave both politics and preaching if the forgery allegations were proven accurate. While the controversy swirled, Eno proceeded with his campaign and named Senator Akon Eyakenyi as his running mate.

Although Okon's case was dismissed by rulings from a Federal High Court in November and Court of Appeal in January, he continues to the Supreme Court as of late January. However, Enyong returned to the forefront with his own lawsuit against Eno that argued that the Ewet Housing Estate primary was legitimate thus Enyong is the rightful nominee. On 20 January, a Federal High Court in Abuja ruled in favour of Enyong and ordered INEC to declare him as the legitimate nominee; while the PDP publicly rejected the ruling, reporting revealed underlying fear that INEC may actually switch recognition to Enyong. Eno and the PDP later filed an application to the Court of Appeal to have the previous ruling dismissed; however, the court rejected the application and adjourned on the case. Nevertheless, the head of Eno's legal team claimed that he was still the PDP nominee due to a stay request from their campaign. Eventually, a Court of Appeal ruling returned recognition to Eno in late February.

==== Nominated ====
- Umo Eno: former Commissioner for Lands and Housing and former Chairman of the Akwa Ibom Hotels and Tourism Board (2004–2007)
  - Running mate—Akon Eyakenyi: Senator for Akwa Ibom South (2019–present); former Minister of Lands, Housing and Urban Development (2010–2015); and former Commissioner for Industry, Commerce and Tourism

==== Eliminated in primary ====
- Sampson Sydney Akpan: businessman
- Janet Moses Edem
- Michael Enyong: House of Representatives member for Uyo/Uruan/Nsit Atai/Ibesikpo Asutan
- Aniekan Etim: financial analyst
- James Iniama: 2007 ACN gubernatorial nominee
- Akan Okon: former Commissioner for Economic Development and the Ibom Deep Seaport
- David Okpon: pastor
- Ide Owodiong-Idemeko: 2019 PDP Akwa Ibom North-East senatorial candidate
- Idorenyin James Umo: businessman
- Ani Wellington: businessman

==== Withdrew ====
- Bassey Albert Akpan: Senator for Akwa Ibom North-East (2015–present) and former Commissioner for Finance (2007–2014) (defected after the primary to successfully run in the YPP gubernatorial primary)
- Onofiok Luke: House of Representatives member for Etinan/Nsit Ibom/Nsit Ubium (2019–present), former House of Assembly member for Nsit Ubium (2011–2019), and former House of Assembly Speaker (2015–2019)
- Akanimo Udofia: businessman (defected prior to the primary to successfully run in the APC gubernatorial primary)

==== Declined ====
- Effiong Dickson Bob: former Senator for Akwa Ibom North-East (2007–2014)
- Ini Ememobong: Commissioner for Information and Strategy (2020–present)
- Udom Inoyo: businessman

==== Results ====
Candidates' vote share
1. Umo Eno (98.8%)
2. Other candidates (1.19%)

PDP primary results
Party	Candidate	Votes	%
PDP	Umo Eno	993	98.81%
PDP	Sampson Sydney Akpan	3	0.30%
PDP	Onofiok Luke (withdrawn)	3	0.30%
PDP	Aniekan Etim	2	0.20%
PDP	Idorenyin James Umo	2	0.20%
PDP	Bassey Albert Akpan (withdrawn)	1	0.10%
PDP	Ide Owodiong-Idemeko	1	0.10%
PDP	Michael Enyong	1	0.10%
PDP	Other candidates	0	0.00%
Total votes		1,005	100.00%
Invalid or blank votes		2	N/A
Turnout		1,007	Unknown

Invalid Ewet Housing Estate primary results
Candidates' vote share
1. ~~Michael Enyong~~ (88.2%)
2. ~~Umo Eno~~ (8.61%)
3. ~~Other candidates~~ (3.21%)

~~PDP Ewet Housing Estate primary results~~
Party	Candidate	Votes	%
PDP	~~Michael Enyong~~	2,448	88.18%
PDP	~~Umo Eno~~	239	8.61%
PDP	~~Bassey Albert Akpan (withdrawn)~~	50	1.80%
PDP	~~Onofiok Luke (withdrawn)~~	34	1.23%
PDP	~~Akan Okon~~	5	0.18%
PDP	~~Other candidates~~	0	0.00%
Total votes		2,776	100.00%

=== Minor parties ===
- Coffie Emem Samuel (Accord)
  - Running mate: Archibong Love Charles Efiom
- Ekanem Abasiekeme Mfonobong (Action Alliance)
  - Running mate: Asuquo Edet
- Essien Ekere Sunday (Action Democratic Party)
  - Running mate: Effiong Godwin Okon
- Mbaba Ehpraim Okon (Action Peoples Party)
  - Running mate: Essang Ebiange Nelly Edet
- Robert Otu Iboro (African Action Congress)
  - Running mate: Carolyna Hutchings
- Ezekiel Nya-Etok (African Democratic Congress)
  - Running mate: James Uduak Udoma
- Ekong Eyo Eyo (Allied Peoples Movement)
  - Running mate: Edwin Raphael Umoette
- Ekpo Ita Bassey (All Progressives Grand Alliance)
  - Running mate: Udoh Anietie Augustus
- Akaninyene Effiong Ekpenyong (Boot Party)
  - Running mate: Itoneeshiet Amaiso
- Uko Usen Okon (Labour Party)
  - Running mate: Victor Okon Okwong
- John James Akpan Udo-Edehe (New Nigeria Peoples Party)
  - Running mate: Godwin Micheal Afangideh
- Etang Kubiat Bassey (National Rescue Movement)
  - Running mate: Ekpe Mfon Effiong
- Ekanem Sunday Francis (People's Redemption Party)
  - Running mate: Emmanuel Effiom Ene
- Udoh Emem Monday (Social Democratic Party)
  - Running mate: Ukut Benedict Asuquo
- Bassey Albert Akpan (Young Progressives Party)
  - Running mate: Asuquo Amba
- Thomas Nsikak Hogan (Zenith Labour Party)
  - Running mate: Udoyo Essi Umo

== Campaign ==
As the general election campaign commenced, focus was on the PDP's attempts to unify the party after the contentious primary process and INEC's non-recognition of the APC primary. While APC figures spent June and July 2022 trying to get INEC to recognise its primary and attacking REC Mike Igini as biased, the PDP attempted to prevent defections from aggrieved party members with a reconciliation committee headed by Senator Effiong Dickson Bob. However, the reconciliation attempt failed as Senator Bassey Albert Akpan left for the Young Progressives Party; similarly, former Senator John James Akpan Udo-Edehe left the APC for the New Nigeria Peoples Party. More disappointing news for the APC came at the end of July when INEC's list of provisional nominees did not recognize Akanimo Udofia as the nominee. For the PDP, good news came at the beginning of August when MHR Onofiok Luke declined to defect and restart his gubernatorial campaign, instead endorsing Ono in a deal brokered by Ntenyin Solomon Etuk—the Oku Ibom Ibibio and Paramount Ruler of Nsit-Ubium. However, a few days later, Akpan formally obtained the YPP nomination at a rerun primary.

Observers noted that regional balance, not just party unity, would also be required for successful campaigns as the PDP faced internal issues due to the decision not to micro-zone the nomination; internal opponents pointed out that Ono is from a federal constituency that has already produced a governor. Other factors included corruption allegations against Akpan and Eno, the relatively small size of the NNPP and YPP compared to the PDP, and a purported plot by some in the APC to coax Udo-Edehe back to the party to become its nominee along with lawsuits against both Akpan and Eno. The zoning controversy, along with the court case attempting to disqualify Ono based on certificate forgery, negatively impacted PDP campaigning in August and September. However, the case was dismissed in November.

By mid-November, pundits observed a swell in minor party support (mainly for the YPP) in the absence of clear opposition to the PDP; however, analysts also noted that minor party supporters were often backing Peter Obi (LP) on the presidential level which could hurt Akpan as Obi supporters would need to split their ticket to vote for both Obi and Akpan. At the same time, both Eno and Akpan intensified their campaigns with Eno commencing his campaign with a rally in the Godswill Akpabio International Stadium while Akpan presented his governance plan to monarchs and other figures. However, a major shift occurred on 1 December when Akpan's long-running corruption trial concluded in a guilty verdict and 42-year imprisonment sentence; as Akpan was promptly incarcerated, the future of his candidacy was unclear until a few days later when Akpan's wife and running mate held a rally vowing to continue the campaign. As Akpan remained on the ballot, law analysts stated that legal questions would only arise if Akpan won the election; in the meantime, focus shifted to Udo-Edehe as Eno's main opponent. However, the situation swiftly returned to the previous status quo when Akpan granted bail on 28 December pending his appeal. Ironically, Eno was also on trial throughout the campaign, on charges of "cheating and dishonestly inducing delivery of property." He was convicted and declared wanted by a judge on 23 December. In early January, the arrest warrant was served to the Inspector General of Police; however, the warrant and conviction was withdrawn a few days later after a successful appeal. Later that month, nine candidates signed a peace accord in Uyo but both Akpan and Eno were not present.

On 20 January, a Federal High Court in Abuja ruled in favour of factional PDP nominee Michael Enyong and ordered INEC to declare him as the legitimate nominee; while the PDP publicly rejected the ruling, reporting revealed underlying fear that INEC may actually switch recognition to Enyong. Amid the controversy, the state chapter of the Nigeria Union of Journalists organized a debate on 29 January 2023 and invited Akpan, Essien Ekere Sunday (ADP), Robert Otu Iboro (AAC), Ezekiel Nya-Etok (ADC), and Udo-Edehe along with Udofia to participate; however, both Eno and Udofia withdrew on the day of the debate. Both the PDP and APC legal battles concluded in the following weeks, with an Appeal Court judgment siding with Eno while the Supreme Court ordered INEC to recognize Udofia in early March.

Much of the last stretch of campaigning was dominated by attention on the presidential election on 25 February. In the election, Akwa Ibom State voted for Atiku Abubakar (PDP); Abubakar won the state with 38.6% of the vote, beating Bola Tinubu (APC) at 28.9% and Peter Obi (LP) at 23.9%. The totals led to increased attention on Eno's chances in the gubernatorial race with the EiE-SBM forecast projecting Eno to win based on "the outcome of the presidential elections." At the same time, reporting from the Daily Post noted the competitiveness of the election while a Premium Times pre-election piece noted the divided opposition.

=== PDP nomination litigation ===
Umo Eno's nomination was challenged by Michael Enyong, a member of the House of Representatives who claimed that he was the legitimate Peoples Democratic Party (PDP) gubernatorial candidate. On 20 January 2023, the Federal High Court in Abuja ruled in favour of Enyong and ordered the Independent National Electoral Commission (INEC) to recognise him as the PDP candidate.

The PDP appealed the decision, maintaining that Eno remained its candidate. On 21 February 2023, the Court of Appeal in Abuja set aside the Federal High Court judgment and restored Eno as the PDP's gubernatorial candidate. The appellate court held that the issue concerning statutory delegates at the party primary was an internal matter of the political party and that the lower court lacked jurisdiction to inquire into it.

=== Legal challenges ===
Following the election, petitions challenging Umo Eno's victory were filed by candidates and political parties including the Young Progressive Party (YPP), All Progressives Congress (APC) and New Nigeria Peoples Party (NNPP).

On 29 September 2023, the Akwa Ibom State Governorship Election Petitions Tribunal dismissed the petition filed by YPP candidate Bassey Albert Akpan and upheld Eno's election. The tribunal also rejected challenges concerning Eno's qualification and his nomination as the PDP candidate.

The Court of Appeal subsequently dismissed appeals challenging the tribunal's decision and upheld Eno's election as governor. The appeals included challenges brought by the APC, YPP and NNPP candidates.

On 11 January 2024, the Supreme Court dismissed appeals brought by the APC, YPP and NNPP and left Eno's election in place. The appeals were withdrawn by the respective appellants after the court indicated that they lacked merit.

=== Election debates ===
2023 Akwa Ibom State gubernatorial election debates
Date	Organiser	P Present (Note: Denotes a party gubernatorial nominee attending the event.) S Surrogate (Note: Denotes a party gubernatorial nominee not attending the event, sending a surrogate in their place.) NI Not invited A Absent invitee								
Date	Organiser	ADP	AAC	ADC	APC	NNPP	PDP	YPP	Other parties	Ref.
29 January	NUJ	P Sunday	P Iboro	P Nya-Etok	A Udofia	P Udo-Edehe	A Eno	P Akpan	NI; Multiple	

=== Conduct ===
The governorship and State House of Assembly elections were held on 18 March 2023 after being postponed from 11 March. According to the Independent National Electoral Commission (INEC), the elections in Akwa Ibom State were substantially peaceful, although there were pockets of violence in some local government areas which resulted in the cancellation of results in some polling units. The cancellations led to a supplementary election in the Etim Ekpo/Ika State Constituency on 15 April 2023.

INEC also reported that policing during the election was weak, with many polling units having no security personnel. The commission nevertheless stated that the security personnel deployed across the local government areas generally operated within their capacity.

=== Electoral timetable ===
On 26 February 2022, the Independent National Electoral Commission released the timetable, setting out key dates and deadlines for the election. Months later on 27 May 2022, INEC made a slight revision to the timetable, allowing parties extra time to conduct primaries.

- 28 February 2022 – Publication of Notice of Election
- 4 April 2022 – First day for the conduct of party primaries
- 9 June 2022 (Note: The original deadline was 3 June; however, INEC pushed it back to 9 June at the behest of parties.) – Final day for the conduct of party primaries, including the resolution of disputes arising from them
- 1 July 2022 – First day for submission of nomination forms to INEC via the online portal
- 15 July 2022 – Final day for submission of nomination forms to INEC via the online portal
- 12 October 2022 – Commencement of the official campaign period
- 16 March 2023 (Note: The original deadline was 9 March; however, INEC pushed it back to 16 March.) – Final day of the official campaign period

== General election ==
2023 Akwa Ibom State gubernatorial election
Party	Candidate	Votes	%
A	Coffie Emem Samuel		
AA	Ekanem Abasiekeme Mfonobong		
ADP	Essien Ekere Sunday		
APP	Mbaba Ehpraim Okon		
AAC	Robert Otu Iboro		
ADC	Ezekiel Nya-Etok		
APM	Ekong Eyo Eyo		
APC	N/A		
APGA	Ekpo Ita Bassey		
BP	Akaninyene Effiong Ekpenyong		
LP	Uko Usen Okon		
New Nigeria Peoples Party	John James Akpan Udo-Edehe		
NRM	Etang Kubiat Bassey		
PDP	Umo Eno		
PRP	Ekanem Sunday Francis		
SDP	Udoh Emem Monday		
YPP	Bassey Albert Akpan		
ZLP	Thomas Nsikak Hogan		
Total votes			100.00%
Invalid or blank votes			N/A
Turnout			

=== By senatorial district ===
The results of the election by senatorial district.

Senatorial District	John James Akpan Udo-Edehe NNPP		Umo Eno PDP		Bassey Albert Akpan YPP		Others		Total Valid Votes
Senatorial District	Votes	Percentage	Votes	Percentage	Votes	Percentage	Votes	Percentage	Total Valid Votes
Akwa Ibom North-East Senatorial District (Note: Comprising the local government areas of Etinan, Ibesikpo Asutan, Ibiono-Ibom, Itu, Nsit-Atai, Nsit-Ibom, Nsit-Ubium, Uruan, and Uyo.) (Uyo Senatorial District)	TBD	%	TBD	%	TBD	%	TBD	%	TBD
Akwa Ibom North-West Senatorial District (Note: Comprising the local government areas of Abak, Essien Udim, Etim Ekpo, Ika, Ikono, Ikot Ekpene, Ini, Obot-Akara, Oruk Anam, and Ukanafun.) (Ikot Ekpene Senatorial District)	TBD	%	TBD	%	TBD	%	TBD	%	TBD
Akwa Ibom South Senatorial District (Note: Comprising the local government areas of Eastern Obolo, Eket, Esit Eket, Ibeno, Ikot-Abasi, Mbo, Mkpat-Enin, Okobo, Onna, Oron, Udung-Uko, and Urue-Offong/Oruko.) (Eket Senatorial District)	TBD	%	TBD	%	TBD	%	TBD	%	TBD
Totals	TBD	%	TBD	%	TBD	%	TBD	%	TBD

=== By federal constituency ===
The results of the election by federal constituency.

Federal Constituency	John James Akpan Udo-Edehe NNPP		Umo Eno PDP		Bassey Albert Akpan YPP		Others		Total Valid Votes
Federal Constituency	Votes	Percentage	Votes	Percentage	Votes	Percentage	Votes	Percentage	Total Valid Votes
Abak/Etim Ekpo/Ika Federal Constituency (Note: Comprising the local government areas of Abak, Etim Ekpo, and Ika.)	TBD	%	TBD	%	TBD	%	TBD	%	TBD
Eket/Onna/Esit Eket/Ibeno Federal Constituency (Note: Comprising the local government areas of Eket, Esit Eket, Ibeno, and Onna.)	TBD	%	TBD	%	TBD	%	TBD	%	TBD
Etinan/Nsit Ibom/Nsit Ubium Federal Constituency (Note: Comprising the local government areas of Etinan, Nsit-Ibom, and Nsit-Ubium.)	TBD	%	TBD	%	TBD	%	TBD	%	TBD
Ikono/Ini Federal Constituency (Note: Comprising the local government areas of Ikono and Ini.)	TBD	%	TBD	%	TBD	%	TBD	%	TBD
Ikot Abasi/Mkpat Enin/Eastern Obolo Federal Constituency (Note: Comprising the local government areas of Eastern Obolo, Ikot-Abasi, and Mkpat-Enin.)	TBD	%	TBD	%	TBD	%	TBD	%	TBD
Ikot Ekpene/Essien Udim/Obot Akara Federal Constituency (Note: Comprising the local government areas of Essien Udim, Ikot Ekpene, and Obot-Akara.)	TBD	%	TBD	%	TBD	%	TBD	%	TBD
Itu/Ibiono Ibom Federal Constituency (Note: Comprising the local government areas of Ibiono-Ibom and Itu.)	TBD	%	TBD	%	TBD	%	TBD	%	TBD
Oron/Mbo/Okobo/Udung Uko/Urue Offong/Oruko Federal Constituency (Note: Comprising the local government areas of Mbo, Okobo, Oron, Udung-Uko, and Urue-Offong/Oruko.)	TBD	%	TBD	%	TBD	%	TBD	%	TBD
Ukanafun/Oruk Anam Federal Constituency (Note: Comprising the local government areas of Oruk Anam and Ukanafun.)	TBD	%	TBD	%	TBD	%	TBD	%	TBD
Uyo/Uruan/Nsit Atai/Ibesikpo Asutan Federal Constituency (Note: Comprising the local government areas of Ibesikpo Asutan, Nsit-Atai, Uruan, and Uyo.)	TBD	%	TBD	%	TBD	%	TBD	%	TBD
Totals	TBD	%	TBD	%	TBD	%	TBD	%	TBD

=== By local government area ===
The results of the election by local government area.

LGA	John James Akpan Udo-Edehe NNPP		Umo Eno PDP		Bassey Albert Akpan YPP		Others		Total Valid Votes	Turnout Percentage
LGA	Votes	Percentage	Votes	Percentage	Votes	Percentage	Votes	Percentage	Total Valid Votes	Turnout Percentage
Abak	TBD	%	TBD	%	TBD	%	TBD	%	TBD	%
Eastern Obolo	TBD	%	TBD	%	TBD	%	TBD	%	TBD	%
Eket	TBD	%	TBD	%	TBD	%	TBD	%	TBD	%
Esit Eket	TBD	%	TBD	%	TBD	%	TBD	%	TBD	%
Essien Udim	TBD	%	TBD	%	TBD	%	TBD	%	TBD	%
Etim Ekpo	TBD	%	TBD	%	TBD	%	TBD	%	TBD	%
Etinan	TBD	%	TBD	%	TBD	%	TBD	%	TBD	%
Ibeno	TBD	%	TBD	%	TBD	%	TBD	%	TBD	%
Ibesikpo Asutan	TBD	%	TBD	%	TBD	%	TBD	%	TBD	%
Ibiono-Ibom	TBD	%	TBD	%	TBD	%	TBD	%	TBD	%
Ika	TBD	%	TBD	%	TBD	%	TBD	%	TBD	%
Ikono	TBD	%	TBD	%	TBD	%	TBD	%	TBD	%
Ikot-Abasi	TBD	%	TBD	%	TBD	%	TBD	%	TBD	%
Ikot Ekpene	TBD	%	TBD	%	TBD	%	TBD	%	TBD	%
Ini	TBD	%	TBD	%	TBD	%	TBD	%	TBD	%
Itu	TBD	%	TBD	%	TBD	%	TBD	%	TBD	%
Mbo	TBD	%	TBD	%	TBD	%	TBD	%	TBD	%
Mkpat-Enin	TBD	%	TBD	%	TBD	%	TBD	%	TBD	%
Nsit-Atai	TBD	%	TBD	%	TBD	%	TBD	%	TBD	%
Nsit-Ibom	TBD	%	TBD	%	TBD	%	TBD	%	TBD	%
Nsit-Ubium	TBD	%	TBD	%	TBD	%	TBD	%	TBD	%
Obot-Akara	TBD	%	TBD	%	TBD	%	TBD	%	TBD	%
Okobo	TBD	%	TBD	%	TBD	%	TBD	%	TBD	%
Onna	TBD	%	TBD	%	TBD	%	TBD	%	TBD	%
Oron	TBD	%	TBD	%	TBD	%	TBD	%	TBD	%
Oruk Anam	TBD	%	TBD	%	TBD	%	TBD	%	TBD	%
Udung-Uko	TBD	%	TBD	%	TBD	%	TBD	%	TBD	%
Ukanafun	TBD	%	TBD	%	TBD	%	TBD	%	TBD	%
Uruan	TBD	%	TBD	%	TBD	%	TBD	%	TBD	%
Urue-Offong/Oruko	TBD	%	TBD	%	TBD	%	TBD	%	TBD	%
Uyo	TBD	%	TBD	%	TBD	%	TBD	%	TBD	%
Totals	TBD	%	TBD	%	TBD	%	TBD	%	TBD	%

== See also ==
- 2023 Nigerian elections
- 2023 Nigerian gubernatorial elections
