= 2023 Nigerian presidential election in Akwa Ibom State =

- 25 February 2023
- Registered: 2,357,418
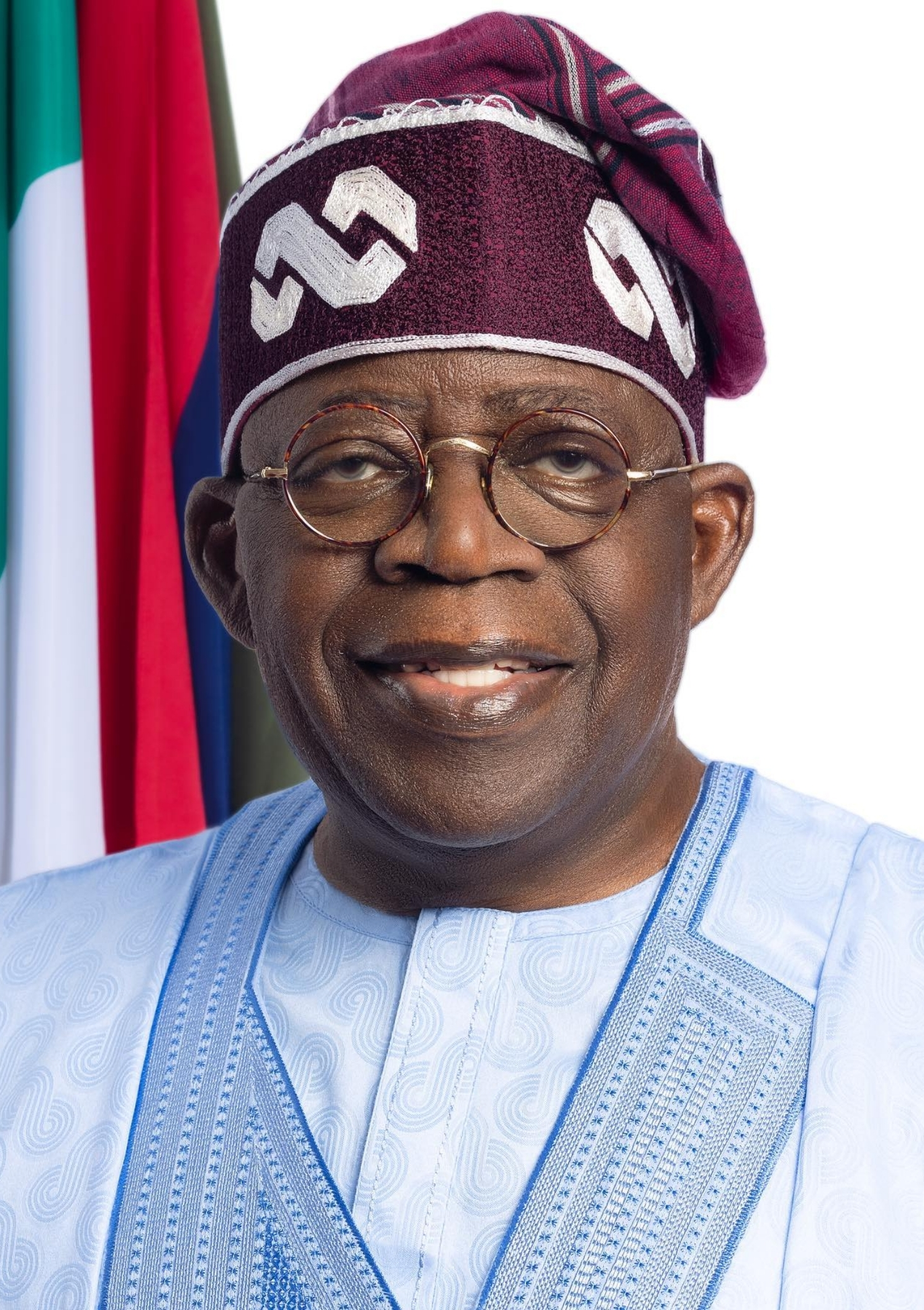

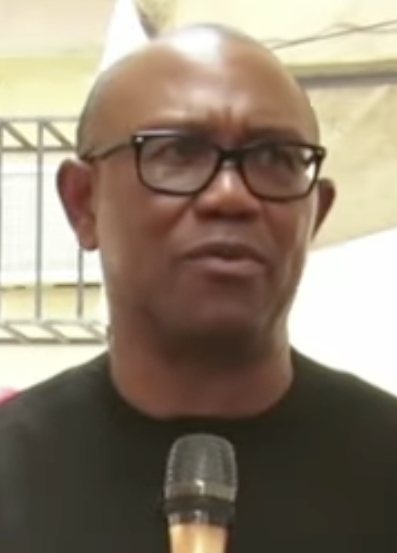

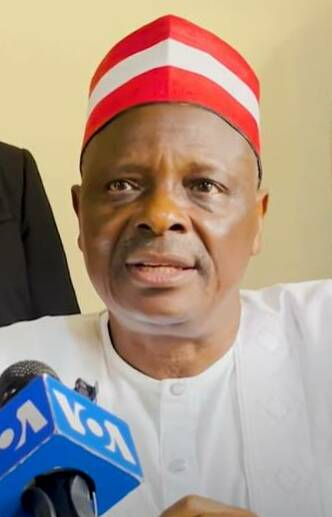

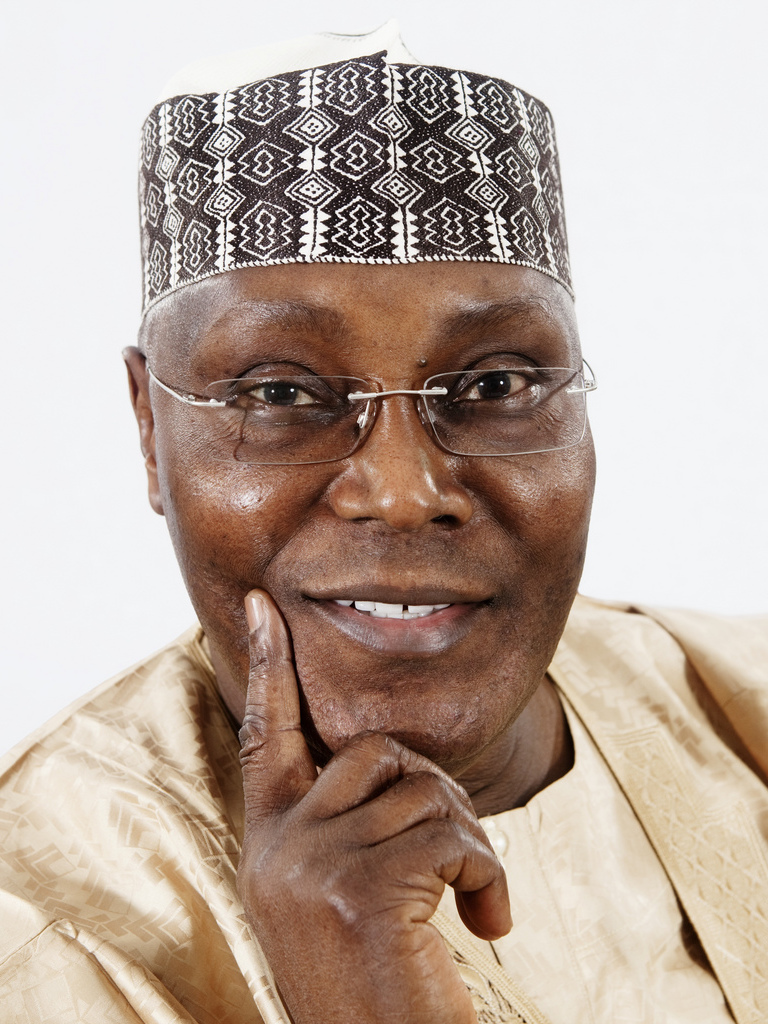
Nominee	Bola Tinubu	Peter Obi
Party	APC	LP
Home state	Lagos	Anambra
Running mate	Kashim Shettima	Yusuf Datti Baba-Ahmed
Nominee	Rabiu Kwankwaso	Atiku Abubakar
Party	NNPP	PDP
Home state	Kano	Adamawa
Running mate	Isaac Idahosa	Ifeanyi Okowa
President before election
Muhammadu Buhari
APC
Elected President
Bola Tinubu
APC

The 2023 Nigerian presidential election in Akwa Ibom State will be held on 25 February 2023 as part of the nationwide 2023 Nigerian presidential election to elect the president and vice president of Nigeria. Other federal elections, including elections to the House of Representatives and the Senate, will also be held on the same date while state elections will be held two weeks afterward on 11 March.

== Background ==
Akwa Ibom State is a small state in the South South mainly populated by Efik-Ibibio peoples; although its oil reserves make it one of the most wealthy states in the nation, Akwa Ibom has faced challenges in security, environmental degradation, and lack of affordable housing in large part due to years of systemic corruption.

Politically, the state's 2019 elections were categorized as a reassertion of the PDP's dominance after Senator Godswill Akpabio and his allies that switched to the APC lost. Statewise, Governor Udom Emmanuel (PDP) easily won re-election with nearly 75% of the vote and 25 of 26 House of Assembly seats were won by the PDP. The PDP was also successful federally, unseating all APC senators and house members to sweep all three senate and ten House of Representatives seats as the state was easily won by PDP presidential nominee Atiku Abubakar with about 68% but still swung towards the APC and had lower turnout.

== Polling ==
Polling organisation/client	Fieldwork date	Sample size					Others	Undecided	Undisclosed	Not voting
Polling organisation/client	Fieldwork date	Sample size	Tinubu APC	Obi LP	Kwankwaso NNPP	Abubakar PDP	Others	Undecided	Undisclosed	Not voting
BantuPage	December 2022	N/A	19%	43%	0%	15%	–	16%	1%	4%
BantuPage	January 2023	N/A	17%	26%	2%	9%	–	13%	13%	21%
Nextier (Akwa Ibom crosstabs of national poll)	27 January 2023	N/A	8.6%	60.5%	–	25.9%	–	4.9%	–	–
SBM Intelligence for EiE (Akwa Ibom crosstabs of national poll)	22 January-6 February 2023	N/A	2%	65%	–	27%	–	6%	–	–

== Projections ==
Source	Projection		As of
Africa Elects (Note: AfricaElects projections predict the likelihood of a candidate winning a state by categorizing a state as "Safe" for exceedingly likely, "Likely" for somewhat likely, and "Lean" for least likely. If no clear determination could be made, states are categorized as "tossups".)	Lean Obi		24 February 2023
Dataphyte (Note: Dataphyte projections predict candidates' projected votal shares in each state.)
Dataphyte	Tinubu:	17.07%	11 February 2023
Dataphyte	Obi:	56.29%	11 February 2023
Dataphyte	Abubakar:	22.75%	11 February 2023
Dataphyte	Others:	3.89%	11 February 2023
Enough is Enough- SBM Intelligence (Note: EiE-SBM projections predict which candidates will win states.)	Obi		17 February 2023
SBM Intelligence (Note: SBM projections predict which candidates will win states or, if no determination could be made, categorizes states as "Too close to call" (TCC).)	Abubakar		15 December 2022
ThisDay (Note: ThisDay projections predict candidates' projected votal shares in each state.)
ThisDay	Tinubu:	15%	27 December 2022
ThisDay	Obi:	30%	27 December 2022
ThisDay	Kwankwaso:	–	27 December 2022
ThisDay	Abubakar:	40%	27 December 2022
ThisDay	Others/Undecided:	15%	27 December 2022
The Nation (Note: SBM projections predict which candidates will win states or, if no determination could be made, categorizes states as "Battlegrounds.")	Abubakar		12-19 February 2023

== General election ==
=== Results ===
2023 Nigerian presidential election in Akwa Ibom State
Party	Candidate	Votes	%
A	Christopher Imumolen		
AA	Hamza al-Mustapha		
ADP	Yabagi Sani		
APP	Osita Nnadi		
AAC	Omoyele Sowore		
ADC	Dumebi Kachikwu		
APC	Bola Tinubu		
APGA	Peter Umeadi		
APM	Princess Chichi Ojei		
BP	Sunday Adenuga		
LP	Peter Obi		
NRM	Felix Johnson Osakwe		
New Nigeria Peoples Party	Rabiu Kwankwaso		
PRP	Kola Abiola		
PDP	Atiku Abubakar		
SDP	Adewole Adebayo		
YPP	Malik Ado-Ibrahim		
ZLP	Dan Nwanyanwu		
Total votes			100.00%
Invalid or blank votes			N/A
Turnout			

==== By senatorial district ====
The results of the election by senatorial district.

Senatorial district	Bola Tinubu APC		Atiku Abubakar PDP		Peter Obi LP		Rabiu Kwankwaso NNPP		Others		Total valid votes
Senatorial district	Votes	%	Votes	%	Votes	%	Votes	%	Votes	%	Total valid votes
Akwa Ibom North-East Senatorial District (Note: Comprising the local government areas of Etinan, Ibesikpo Asutan, Ibiono-Ibom, Itu, Nsit-Atai, Nsit-Ibom, Nsit-Ubium, Uruan, and Uyo.)	TBD	%	TBD	%	TBD	%	TBD	%	TBD	%	TBD
Akwa Ibom North-West Senatorial District (Note: Comprising the local government areas of Abak, Essien Udim, Etim Ekpo, Ika, Ikono, Ikot Ekpene, Ini, Obot-Akara, Oruk Anam, and Ukanafun.)	TBD	%	TBD	%	TBD	%	TBD	%	TBD	%	TBD
Akwa Ibom South Senatorial District (Note: Comprising the local government areas of Eastern Obolo, Eket, Esit Eket, Ibeno, Ikot-Abasi, Mbo, Mkpat-Enin, Okobo, Onna, Oron, Udung-Uko, and Urue-Offong/Oruko.)	TBD	%	TBD	%	TBD	%	TBD	%	TBD	%	TBD
Totals	TBD	%	TBD	%	TBD	%	TBD	%	TBD	%	TBD

==== By federal constituency ====
The results of the election by federal constituency.

Federal constituency	Bola Tinubu APC		Atiku Abubakar PDP		Peter Obi LP		Rabiu Kwankwaso NNPP		Others		Total valid votes
Federal constituency	Votes	%	Votes	%	Votes	%	Votes	%	Votes	%	Total valid votes
Abak/Etim Ekpo/Ika Federal Constituency (Note: Comprising the local government areas of Abak, Etim Ekpo, and Ika.)	TBD	%	TBD	%	TBD	%	TBD	%	TBD	%	TBD
Eket/Onna/Esit Eket/Ibeno Federal Constituency (Note: Comprising the local government areas of Eket, Esit Eket, Ibeno, and Onna.)	TBD	%	TBD	%	TBD	%	TBD	%	TBD	%	TBD
Etinan/Nsit Ibom/Nsit Ubium Federal Constituency (Note: Comprising the local government areas of Etinan, Nsit-Ibom, and Nsit-Ubium.)	TBD	%	TBD	%	TBD	%	TBD	%	TBD	%	TBD
Ikono/Ini Federal Constituency (Note: Comprising the local government areas of Ikono and Ini.)	TBD	%	TBD	%	TBD	%	TBD	%	TBD	%	TBD
Ikot Abasi/Mkpat Enin/Eastern Obolo Federal Constituency (Note: Comprising the local government areas of Eastern Obolo, Ikot-Abasi, and Mkpat-Enin.)	TBD	%	TBD	%	TBD	%	TBD	%	TBD	%	TBD
Ikot Ekpene/Essien Udim/Obot Akara Federal Constituency (Note: Comprising the local government areas of Essien Udim, Ikot Ekpene, and Obot-Akara.)	TBD	%	TBD	%	TBD	%	TBD	%	TBD	%	TBD
Itu/Ibiono Ibom Federal Constituency (Note: Comprising the local government areas of Ibiono-Ibom and Itu.)	TBD	%	TBD	%	TBD	%	TBD	%	TBD	%	TBD
Oron/Mbo/Okobo/Udung Uko/Urue Offong/Oruko Federal Constituency (Note: Comprising the local government areas of Mbo, Okobo, Oron, Udung-Uko, and Urue-Offong/Oruko.)	TBD	%	TBD	%	TBD	%	TBD	%	TBD	%	TBD
Ukanafun/Oruk Anam Federal Constituency (Note: Comprising the local government areas of Oruk Anam and Ukanafun.)	TBD	%	TBD	%	TBD	%	TBD	%	TBD	%	TBD
Uyo/Uruan/Nsit Atai/Ibesikpo Asutan Federal Constituency (Note: Comprising the local government areas of Ibesikpo Asutan, Nsit-Atai, Uruan, and Uyo.)	TBD	%	TBD	%	TBD	%	TBD	%	TBD	%	TBD
Totals	TBD	%	TBD	%	TBD	%	TBD	%	TBD	%	TBD

==== By local government area ====
The results of the election by local government area.

Local government area	Bola Tinubu APC		Atiku Abubakar PDP		Peter Obi LP		Rabiu Kwankwaso NNPP		Others		Total valid votes	Turnout (%)
Local government area	Votes	%	Votes	%	Votes	%	Votes	%	Votes	%	Total valid votes	Turnout (%)
Abak	TBD	%	TBD	%	TBD	%	TBD	%	TBD	%	TBD	%
Eastern Obolo	TBD	%	TBD	%	TBD	%	TBD	%	TBD	%	TBD	%
Eket	TBD	%	TBD	%	TBD	%	TBD	%	TBD	%	TBD	%
Esit Eket	TBD	%	TBD	%	TBD	%	TBD	%	TBD	%	TBD	%
Essien Udim	TBD	%	TBD	%	TBD	%	TBD	%	TBD	%	TBD	%
Etim Ekpo	TBD	%	TBD	%	TBD	%	TBD	%	TBD	%	TBD	%
Etinan	TBD	%	TBD	%	TBD	%	TBD	%	TBD	%	TBD	%
Ibeno	TBD	%	TBD	%	TBD	%	TBD	%	TBD	%	TBD	%
Ibesikpo Asutan	TBD	%	TBD	%	TBD	%	TBD	%	TBD	%	TBD	%
Ibiono-Ibom	TBD	%	TBD	%	TBD	%	TBD	%	TBD	%	TBD	%
Ika	TBD	%	TBD	%	TBD	%	TBD	%	TBD	%	TBD	%
Ikono	TBD	%	TBD	%	TBD	%	TBD	%	TBD	%	TBD	%
Ikot-Abasi	TBD	%	TBD	%	TBD	%	TBD	%	TBD	%	TBD	%
Ikot Ekpene	TBD	%	TBD	%	TBD	%	TBD	%	TBD	%	TBD	%
Ini	TBD	%	TBD	%	TBD	%	TBD	%	TBD	%	TBD	%
Itu	TBD	%	TBD	%	TBD	%	TBD	%	TBD	%	TBD	%
Mbo	TBD	%	TBD	%	TBD	%	TBD	%	TBD	%	TBD	%
Mkpat-Enin	TBD	%	TBD	%	TBD	%	TBD	%	TBD	%	TBD	%
Nsit-Atai	TBD	%	TBD	%	TBD	%	TBD	%	TBD	%	TBD	%
Nsit-Ibom	TBD	%	TBD	%	TBD	%	TBD	%	TBD	%	TBD	%
Nsit-Ubium	TBD	%	TBD	%	TBD	%	TBD	%	TBD	%	TBD	%
Obot-Akara	TBD	%	TBD	%	TBD	%	TBD	%	TBD	%	TBD	%
Okobo	TBD	%	TBD	%	TBD	%	TBD	%	TBD	%	TBD	%
Onna	TBD	%	TBD	%	TBD	%	TBD	%	TBD	%	TBD	%
Oron	TBD	%	TBD	%	TBD	%	TBD	%	TBD	%	TBD	%
Oruk Anam	TBD	%	TBD	%	TBD	%	TBD	%	TBD	%	TBD	%
Udung-Uko	TBD	%	TBD	%	TBD	%	TBD	%	TBD	%	TBD	%
Ukanafun	TBD	%	TBD	%	TBD	%	TBD	%	TBD	%	TBD	%
Uruan	TBD	%	TBD	%	TBD	%	TBD	%	TBD	%	TBD	%
Urue-Offong/Oruko	TBD	%	TBD	%	TBD	%	TBD	%	TBD	%	TBD	%
Uyo	TBD	%	TBD	%	TBD	%	TBD	%	TBD	%	TBD	%
Totals	TBD	%	TBD	%	TBD	%	TBD	%	TBD	%	TBD	%

== See also ==
- 2023 Akwa Ibom State elections
- 2023 Nigerian presidential election
