= Constance Ikokwu =

Nigerian journalist and news analyst

- Occupations: Journalist, News Analyst, Educator and Media Strategist
- Writing career
- Notable works: Nigeria: Half a Century of Progress & Challenges

Chidiogor Constance Ikokwu is a Nigerian journalist, news analyst, educator and media strategist. She started her career as a cub reporter and rose through the ranks to become Deputy Editor. She lectured at the Institute for American Universities (IAU), Barcelona, and Autonomous University of Barcelona (UAB) Department of Journalism and Communication Sciences. She is Editorial Lead for the African Press Club (TAPC). In addition, she is a News Analyst at Arise Television, Nigeria.

== Education and career ==
Ikokwu earned her first degree in Political Science from Lagos State University, Nigeria; a Master's Degree in International Law & International Relations from Lancaster University, United Kingdom; and graduated from Autonomous University of Barcelona (UAB), Spain, with a PhD in Journalism and Communications. Her doctoral thesis focused on the intersection of media and politics, specifically examining the concept of Mediatization, and the role of media during elections.

Ikokwu began her career in 2001 as a political reporter at THISDAY Newspapers, Nigeria’s leading national daily and went on to cover other issues including business, and international affairs. Her career took her from Nigeria to Sudan, DR Congo, Europe and the Americas. Ikokwu was a Foreign Correspondent in Washington, D.C. between 2007 and 2009.

While in the US as a foreign correspondent, she covered the US 2008 primaries and presidential elections. She reported Africa-related news from the leading political and economic institutions including the White House, U.S. Congress, World Bank, the International Monetary Fund (IMF), State Department and the United Nations (UN).

Ikokwu was a commentator for the National Public Radio (NPR) U.S. and “The World” co-produced in Boston by the BBC and Public Radio International. She has spoken at forums at the House of Commons, UK Parliament, the American University, Johns Hopkins University, Indiana University Purdue University Indianapolis, George Washington University, Syracuse University, the National Press Club, the Cosmos Club and the Foreign Press Center (FPC) Washington, D.C, and the Trade and Sustainable Development symposium in 2017.

In 2011, she compiled and edited the book 'Nigeria: Half a Century of Progress and Challenges'. Ikokwu was the host of “The Encounter” and co-host for “Democracy Now” radio shows on WE FM Radio. Her work has appeared in Aljazeera, Nigerian Television Authority (NTA), the Daily Post, the Africa Report, Africa Confidential, and Turkish National Television (TRT World).

She was the Strategy and Communications Adviser to the Nigerian Minister of Industry, Trade and Investment Okey Enelamah and was previously Media Adviser to Former Nigerian Minister of Finance Ngozi Okonjo-Iweala.
