= Nsikak =

Nsikak is a Nigerian unisex name of Ibibio origin which means 'nothing is too hard'. It is a diminutive version of names such as NsikakAbasi, meaning 'nothing is too heavy for God', and Nsikakobong, meaning 'nothing is more than God'.

== Notable people with the name ==
- Nsikak Eduok (1947–2021), Chief of the Air Staff of the Nigerian Air Force
- Nsikak Ekong (born 1965), Nigerian politician
- Nsikak Ekpo (born 2003), Dutch sprinter
