= Ikot Eyo =

Village in Nigeria

Coordinates: 4°45′56″N 7°57′53″E

Ikot Eyo, or Ikot Eyd, is a populated village in the local government area of Nsit Ubium in Akwa Ibom State, Nigeria. Ikot Eyo is situated near the village of Ikot Edikpe and the town Ikot Edibon. It has an estimated terrain elevation of above sea level of 40 metres (131 feet). Ikot Eyo has hotels such as True Value Hotel, Roseeboom suites and restaurant, pejess Hotel, Passion Hotels and Suites, and Paulveen Hotels.
