= Ikot Onwon Ediene =

Coordinates: 5.23060°N 7.80827°E

Ikot Onwon Ediene is a village in Ediene Usung Itu in the Ikono local government area of Akwa Ibom State in southern Nigeria.
