= Okpolupm Etteh =

Nigerian politician

Okpolupm Ikpong Etteh (born 19 September 1970) is a Nigerian politician. He currently serves as the Federal Representative for the Eket/Onna/Esit Eket/Ibeno Federal Constituency in Akwa Ibom State in the Federal House of Representatives.

== Background ==
Okpulupum is from Ibeno Local Government Area.

== Career ==
Etteh served as the Commissioner for special duties in Akwa Ibom State under Governor Udom Emmanuel administration. He was reappointed to the same position in 2023, following the inauguration of Governor Umo Eno .
