= Nsikak Ekong =

Nigerian politician

Rt. Hon Nsikak Okon Ekong

Former Member of the House of Representatives, Current Commissioner for Environment and Mineral Resources, Akwa Ibom State
- Constituency: Ikot Ekpene/Essien Udim/Obot Akara Federal Constituency

Personal details
- Born: 1965 (age 60–61) Ikot Ekpene, Akwa Ibom State, Nigeria
- Party: All Progressive Congress
- Occupation: Politician

Rt. Hon. Nsikak Okon Ekong (born 1965) is a politician who has served as the Representative for the Ikot Ekpene/Obot Akara State House of Assembly, Representative for the Ikot Ekpene/Essien Udim/Obot Akara Federal Constituency in the Nigerian House of Representatives, under the Peoples Democratic Party (PDP) platform. He is currently the Commissioner for Environment and Mineral Resources (2026), Akwa Ibom State.

== Early life and education ==
Ekong was born in 1965 in Akwa Ibom State, Nigeria.

== Political career ==
Ekong served as a member of the Akwa Ibom State House of Assembly from 2007 to 2015. In 2019, he contested the Ikot Ekpene/Essien Udim/Obot Akara Federal Constituency seat on the platform of the People's Democratic Party (PDP). He won the election with 29,849 votes. He served in the House of Representatives of Nigeria from 2019 to 2023. He lost the PDP nomination for the constituency ahead of the 2023 general election and did not return to the National Assembly.

== Commissioner ==
In February 2025, Governor Umo Eno nominated Ekong as a commissioner in the Akwa Ibom State Executive Council. He was assigned the Environment and Mineral Resources portfolio.
