= Koko Essien =

Nigerian former Army officer and politician

Brigadier General Koko Essien (retired) is a former Nigerian Army officer and politician, current Commissioner of Internal Security and Waterways in Akwa Ibom State, Nigeria.

== Background ==
Essien is from Uruan local government area, Akwa Ibom State.

== Career ==
In August 2023, Governor Umo Eno established a Ministry of Internal Security and Waterways to oversee security strategy across the state. Essien was appointed as a commissioner to lead this newly created ministry.
