= Ekerete Ekanem =

Nigerian politician

Commissioner for Youth Development, Akwa Ibom State
- Incumbent
- Assumed office February 2025
- Governor: Umo Eno

Personal details
- Born: Ekanem Ekerette Paul; September 23, 1983 (age 43) Akwa Ibom State, Nigeria
- Party: People's Democratic Party (PDP)
- Occupation: Medical doctor, politician

Ekanem Ekerrete Paul (born 23 September 1983) is a Nigerian medical professional, and politician currently serving as the commissioner for youth development in Akwa Ibom state. He was appointed in February 2025 by Governor Umo Eno.

== Early life and education ==
Ekanem is a native of Utu Ikot imonte in Etim ekpo local government area, Akwa ibom state. Ekanem bagged a Bachelor of Science degree in Human Anatomy and also earned a Bachelor of Medicine and Surgery (MBBS) with distinction in Human Anatomy, both from the University of Calabar. He has also contributed to the society through scientific research, which includes the paper "Digital Dermatoglyphic Patterns of Annang Ethnic Group in Akwa Ibom State.

== Career ==
=== Medical career ===
He began his professional practice at the University of Uyo Teaching Hospital, where he worked as a resident doctor and continues his postgraduate training under the National Postgraduate Medical College of Nigeria in pursuit of an associate fellow. He was also a surgeon in training at the West African College of Surgeons specializing in Obstetrics and Gynaecology. He is a member of the Nigerian Medical Association (NMA) and also an associate member in the Society of Gynaecology and Obstetrics of Nigeria (SOGON).

=== Political career ===
He served as a secretary of the Etim Ekpo Local Government Transition Committee in 2024, he also served as the secretary of the PDP Congresses Committee, Etim Ekpo Chapter. He served as a LOC Secretary in the PDP Local Government Primaries and the Secretary of the Campaigns Committee for Etim Ekpo Local Government Elections in 2024. He was Appointed Honourable Commissioner for Youth Development, Akwa Ibom State in 2025.

== Personal life ==
He is married to Mrs. Goodness Alphonsus Ekanem with three children.
