= Eket/Onna/Esit Eket/Ibeno federal constituency =

Federal constituency in Akwa Ibom, Nigeria

Eket/Onna/Esit Eket/Ibeno
- constituency for the House of Representatives
- District: Akwa Ibom South
- State: Akwa Ibom, Nigeria

Current constituency
- Party: Peoples Democratic Party
- Member: Okpolupm Etteh

Eket/Onna/Esit Eket/Ibeno is a federal constituency in Akwa Ibom State, Nigeria. It covers Eket, Onna, Esit Eket and Ibeno local government areas in the state. Eket/Onna/Esit Eket/Ibeno is represented by Okpolupm Etteh of the Peoples Democratic Party of Nigeria.
