= 2019 Nigerian House of Representatives elections in Akwa Ibom State =

The 2019 Nigerian House of Representatives elections in Akwa Ibom State was held on February 23, 2019, to elect members of the House of Representatives to represent Akwa Ibom State, Nigeria.

== Overview ==
Affiliation	Party		Total
Affiliation	APC	PDP	Total
Before Election	0	10	10
After Election	0	10	10

== Summary ==
District	Incumbent	Party	Elected Rep	Party
Abak/Etim Ekpo/Ika	Emmanuel Ekon	PDP	Aniekan John Umanah	PDP
Eket/Onna/Esit Eket/Ibeno	Owoidighe Ekpoatai	PDP	Ifon Patrick	PDP
Etinan/Nsit Ibom/Nsit ubium	Samuel Ikon	PDP	Onofiok Luke	PDP
Ikono/Ini	Iboro Ekanem	PDP	Emmanuel Ukpongudo	PDP
Ikot Abasi/Mkpat Enin/Eastern Obolo	Francis Uduyok	PDP	Francis Uduyok	PDP
Ikot Ekpene/Essien Udim/ Obot Akara	Emmanuel Akpan	PDP	Ekong Nsikak	PDP
Itu/Ibiono Ibom	Henry Archibong	PDP	Henry Archibong	PDP
Oron/Mbo/Okobo/Udung Uko/Urue Offong/Oruko	Nse Ekpenyong	PDP	Nse Ekpenyong	PDP
Ukanafun/Oruk Anam	Emmanuel Ukoete	PDP	Unyime Josiah Idem	PDP
Uyo/Uruan/Nsit Atai/ Ibesikpo Asutan	Michael Enyong	PDP	Michael Enyong	PDP

== Results ==
=== Abak/Etim Ekpo/Ika ===
A total of 13 candidates registered with the Independent National Electoral Commission to contest in the election. PDP candidate Aniekan John Umanah won the election, defeating APC Ekon Emmanuel and 11 other party candidates. John received 70% of the votes, while Emmanuel received 29.78%.

2019 Nigerian House of Representatives election in Akwa Ibom State
Party	Candidate	Votes	%
PDP	Aniekan John Umanah	31,720	70.0%
APC	Ekon Emmanuel	13,496	29.78%
Others		101	0.22%
Total votes		45,317	100%
PDP hold			

=== Eket/Onna/Esit Eket/Ibeno ===
A total of 8 candidates registered with the Independent National Electoral Commission to contest in the election. PDP candidate Ifon Patrick won the election, defeating APC Akpabio Alex Kufre and 6 other party candidates. Patrick received 84.23% of the votes, while Alex received 15.44%.

2019 Nigerian House of Representatives election in Akwa Ibom State
Party	Candidate	Votes	%
PDP	Ifon Patrick	61,580	84.23%
APC	Akpabio Alex Kufre	11,263	15.44%
Others		94	0.13%
Total votes		72,937	100%
PDP hold			

=== Etinan/Nsit Ibom/Nsit ubium ===
A total of 10 candidates registered with the Independent National Electoral Commission to contest in the election. PDP candidate Onofiok Luke won the election, defeating APC Akpan Daniel and 8 other party candidates. Luke received 73.73% of the votes, while Daniel received 25.99%.

2019 Nigerian House of Representatives election in Akwa Ibom State
Party	Candidate	Votes	%
PDP	Onofiok Luke	44,833	73.73%
APC	Akpan Daniel	15,800	25.99%
Others		171	0.28%
Total votes		60,804	100%
PDP hold			

=== Ikono/Ini ===
A total of 7 candidates registered with the Independent National Electoral Commission to contest in the election. PDP candidate Emmanuel Ukpongudo won the election, defeating APC Idiong Effiong and 5 other party candidates. Ukpongudo received 72.94% of the votes, while Effiong received 26.98%.

2019 Nigerian House of Representatives election in Akwa Ibom State
Party	Candidate	Votes	%
PDP	Emmanuel Ukpongudo	21,622	72.94%
APC	Idiong Effiong	7,997	26.98%
Others		23	0.08%
Total votes		29,642	100%
PDP hold			

=== Ikot Abasi/Mkpat Enin/Eastern Obolo ===
A total of 9 candidates registered with the Independent National Electoral Commission to contest in the election. PDP candidate Francis Uduyok won the election, defeating APC Bernard Udoh and 7 other party candidates. Uduyok received 74.01% of the votes, while Udoh received 25.93%.

2019 Nigerian House of Representatives election in Akwa Ibom State
Party	Candidate	Votes	%
PDP	Francis Uduyok	31,465	74.01%
APC	Bernard Udoh	11,026	25.93%
Others		26	0.06%
Total votes		42,517	100%
PDP hold			

=== Ikot Ekpene/Essien Udim/ Obot Akara ===
A total of 9 candidates registered with the Independent National Electoral Commission to contest in the election. PDP candidate Nsikak Ekong won the election, defeating APC Emmanuel Akpan and 7 other party candidates. Ekong received 57.36% of the votes, while Akpan received 42.38%.

2019 Nigerian House of Representatives election in Akwa Ibom State
Party	Candidate	Votes	%
PDP	Nsikak Ekong	29,849	57.36%
APC	Emmanuel Akpan	22,052	42.38%
Others		135	0.26%
Total votes		52,036	100%
PDP hold			

=== Itu/Ibiono Ibom ===
A total of 9 candidates registered with the Independent National Electoral Commission to contest in the election. PDP candidate Henry Archibong won the election, defeating APC Edet Ikotidem and 7 other party candidates. Archibong received 68.92% of the votes, while Ikotidem received 30.98%.

2019 Nigerian House of Representatives election in Akwa Ibom State
Party	Candidate	Votes	%
PDP	Henry Archibong	41,459	68.92%
APC	Edet Ikotidem	18,638	30.98%
Others		60	0.10%
Total votes		60,157	100%
PDP hold			

=== Oron/Mbo/Okobo/Udung Uko/Urue Offong/Oruko ===
A total of 8 candidates registered with the Independent National Electoral Commission to contest in the election. PDP candidate Nse Ekpenyong won the election, defeating APC Victor Antai and 6 other party candidates. Ekpenyong received 52.85% of the votes, while Antai received 47.03%.

2019 Nigerian House of Representatives election in Akwa Ibom State
Party	Candidate	Votes	%
PDP	Nse Ekpenyong	30,878	52.85%
APC	Victor Antai	27,477	47.03%
Others		67	0.11%
Total votes		58,422	100%
PDP hold			

=== Ukanafun/Oruk Anam ===
A total of 7 candidates registered with the Independent National Electoral Commission to contest in the election. PDP candidate Unyime Idem won the election, defeating APC Emmanuel Ukoette and 5 other party candidates. Idem received 74.75% of the votes, while Ukoette received 22.97%.

2019 Nigerian House of Representatives election in Akwa Ibom State
Party	Candidate	Votes	%
PDP	Unyime Idem	57,443	74.75%
APC	Emmanuel Ukoette	17,190	22.97%
Others		214	0.29%
Total votes		74,847	100%
PDP hold			

=== Uyo/Uruan/Nsit Atai/Ibesikpo Asutan ===
A total of 15 candidates registered with the Independent National Electoral Commission to contest in the election. PDP candidate Michael Enyong won the election, defeating APC Ekerete Edem Ekpenyong and 13 other party candidates. Enyong received 83.60% of the votes, while Ekpenyong received 15.93%.

2019 Nigerian House of Representatives election in Akwa Ibom State
Party	Candidate	Votes	%
PDP	Michael Enyong	57,712	83.60%
APC	Ekerete Edem Ekpenyong	10,995	15.93%
Others		327	0.47%
Total votes		69,034	100%
PDP hold			
