= Onofiok Luke =

Nigerian politician

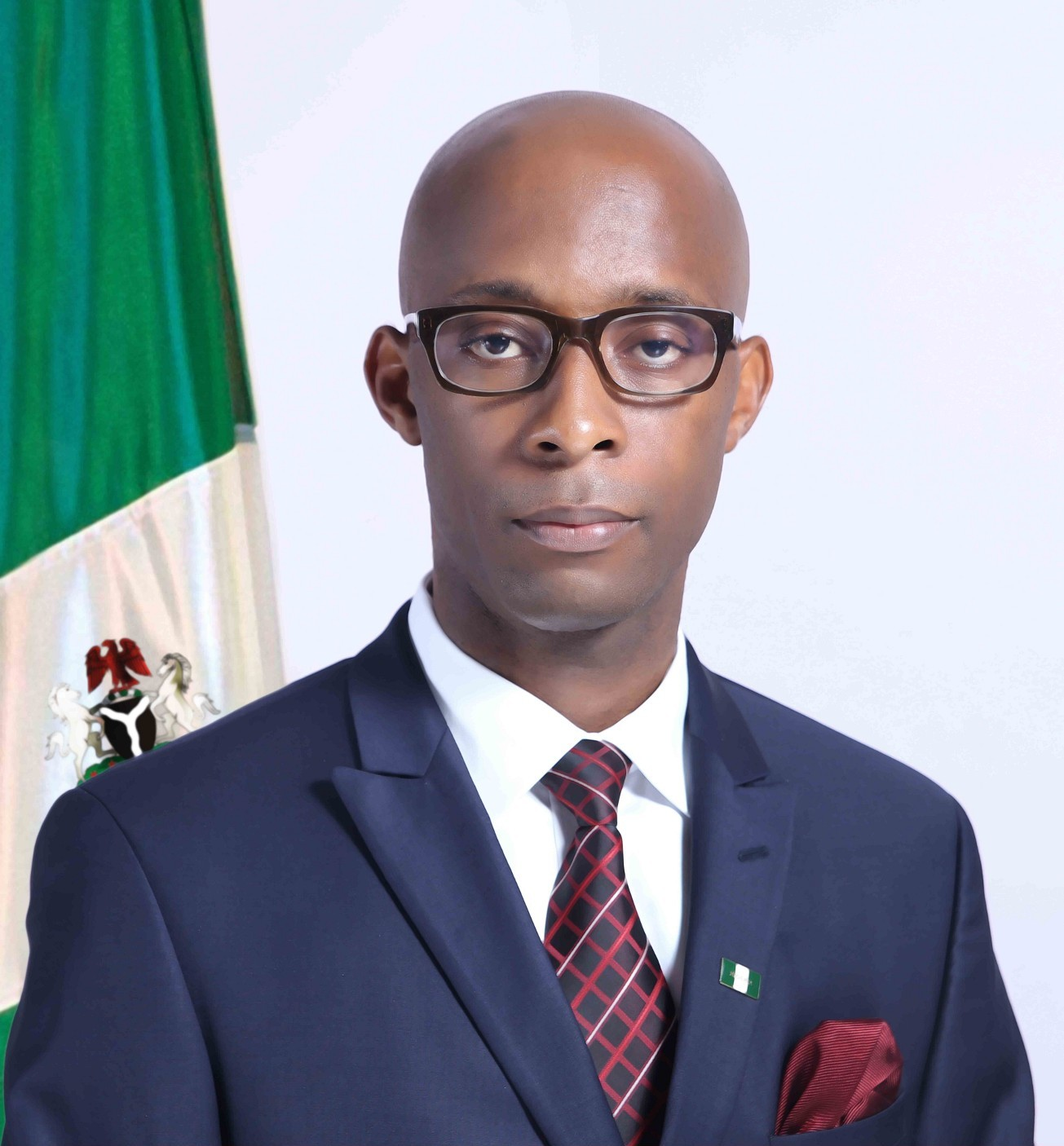

Honorable Member Representing Etinan/Nsit Ibom/Nsit Ubium Federal Constituency in the Nigerian House of Representatives
- Constituency: Etinan/Nsit Ibom/Nsit Ubium Federal Constituency
- Incumbent
- Assumed office 11 June 2019

Personal details
- Born: 16 March 1978 (age 48)
- Spouse(s): Uduak Onofiok Luke, PhD
- Education: University of Uyo
- Occupation: Nigerian Lawmaker
- Profession: Lawyer
- Website: http://onofiokluke.ng/

Onofiok Akpan Luke (born 16 March 1978) is a lawyer and legislator in the Nigerian House of Representatives.

== Personal life and education ==
Luke graduated in 2005 from the University of Uyo, Nigeria with an LL.B. In 2009, he underwent further studies at the Nigerian Law School where he obtained the qualification to become a Barrister at Law in Nigeria in 2010.

The lawmaker had a humble upbringing by Christian parents who both worked in Nigeria's Civil Service. Many give his mother, Deaconess Lawrencia Luke, the credit for Onofiok's moral high ground.

After a 3-year engagement with Governor Godswill Akpabio as Personal Assistant, Onofiok was nominated to the Nigerian Youth Parliament where he was later elected as the pioneer Speaker (2007- 2010) of the 109-member Parliament, a non-stipendiary institution/ training program of the Federal Ministry of Youth and Sports Development in collaboration with the National Assembly put together by then President Umaru Musa Yar'Adua to engage the Nigerian Youth and provide legislative and administrative training that will prepare them for future challenges especially those with high degree of interest in lawmaking, and also to help generate inputs from young Nigerians that could possibly be injected into the country's mainstream governance system.

In 2011, Luke won sufficient votes at the primaries of the People's Democratic Party (Nigeria) to run in that year's general election for a seat to represent Nsit Ubium state constituency in the Akwa Ibom state House of Assembly. He was elected on 21 December 2015 as the 11th Speaker of the Akwa Ibom state House of Assembly.

Luke is still seen as a rights activist although in recent years, he has played less activist roles as he becomes more deeply involved in leadership at both national and state levels.

His activism gained national prominence when he served as President of the Student Union Government of the University of Uyo. Onofiok led a mass student protest against the university management which had increased school fees and other sundry charges for students of the institution without justification. Onofiok, like many other students he led at the time, believed that being a government-funded institution, the arbitrary increase in fees by the University of Uyo was callous and uncalled for. Other displeased students from across Nigeria who were in solidarity with Luke and the University of Uyo students joined the protest.

Following the peaceful protest he led, one still seen as a rare bravery, the university management rusticated Luke for two years. But after having been found clean of every allegation by the school, Onofiok was recalled later to complete his studies for a degree in Law.

Luke's boldness, erudition, and principles have earned him the respect of many of Nigeria's youths. He is an alumnus of the Harvard Business School Executive Education programme and an Honorary Texan.

Luke, in 2011, became an Associate Fellow of the Nigeria Leadership Initiative (NLI), an international non-profit platform for credible, accomplished and uniquely patriotic Nigerians. He is also a member of the Nigerian Bar Association (NBA).

== Legislative career (2007–present) ==
Luke began his political career as the pioneer Speaker of the Nigerian Youth Parliament in 2007 where he was able to gain the trust of the Nigerian Youth before venturing into the main stream political circle in his home state of Akwa Ibom.

Luke was first elected to the Akwa Ibom state legislature in April 2011. He was overwhelmingly reelected for a second term on 11 April 2015. On 21 December 2015, the 26-member Akwa Ibom state House of Assembly elected him as the 11th Speaker of the parliament.

As a lawmaker, Luke has sponsored more than 10 private member bills in the Akwa Ibom State House of Assembly, 7 of which have been passed into law: The Law to provide for the establishment of the Akwa Ibom State HIV/AIDS control agency, functions of the agency, and for connected matters; and The Law to amend the Magistrate Court Laws 2000 and for matters connected therewith. In 2017, his bill for a primary healthcare development agency well as the state health insurance scheme and agency were passed into law. He also championed the provision of affordable housing in the Akwa Ibom state through the law for social housing sponsored by him.

Luke's human right activism is evident in some of the bills and motions he moves on the floor of the Akwa Ibom State House of Assembly. Such include his bill which seeks a law to protect the Physically challenged persons in his state from all forms of discrimination and to provide for equal opportunities for every person. He is also pushing the state executive to establish a state Department for Disability Affairs in order to safeguard the rights and privileges of people living with disability.

The bills for laws to provide for the safety of employees in construction companies and industries in Akwa Ibom State, and to protect the physically challenged against discrimination in Akwa Ibom State are at various legislative stages.

In 2013, Luke began moves to get his state government to become better committed to environmental protection. He submitted to the Assembly a bill to create an Environmental protection law for the regulation of Sand mining activities and dredging operations in the state of Akwa Ibom.

Luke has also from time to time moved motions on the floor of the House, motions which are critical to the smooth running of Akwa Ibom state. Some of these motions are the motion for a resolution to mandate the Executive arm of government to publish the state's official gazette, prevent the spread of Lassa fever in Akwa Ibom State, prevent indiscriminate excavations and sand mining, and the prevention of cattle grazing in farmlands and movement of cattle on thoroughfares.

While serving on the legislative committee on appropriation and finance, Luke was instrumental to the introduction of Participatory budgeting where public hearings were held on state appropriation bills from the executive to ensure due process. His committee would not endorse a bill for the fiscal year until Civil Societies, representatives of women and youth groups, religious associations, and members of the media made inputs which will form parts of the law approving appropriations made.

Luke in 2013 was reported to have saved his state well over $6 million when he stood down a request for 1billion Nigerian Naira by the state executive which claimed the money was going to be used to establish the Ibom Airlines.

Local media reported that by stopping the inclusion of the money in the state's 2014 appropriation law, Luke had stopped what would have been a major racketeering by state officials. Reports say Luke stopped the approval of the requested 1billion Naira because the state Budget Department could not prove that the money had not been collected under the same subhead by the state's Special Duties ministry in the previous fiscal year and was accounted for. He was changed from the Finance and Appropriation Committee by the House leadership to the Agriculture and Natural Resources Committee a few months later.

He has been collaborating with local agriculturalists in the state to work out laws which will improve food production in the state.

Although described as a "stubborn lawmaker" by local media in 2014 for engaging in a career threatening row with state officials on certain obnoxious policies in the state, Luke firmly told Nigeria's Daily Independent Newspaper in March 2014 that "Lawmakers don't have to be confrontational" in their line of duty.

On Friday, 29 June 2018, the Speaker of the Akwa Ibom State House of Assembly, Barrister Onofiok Luke, officially declared his intention to contest for the Etinan Federal House of Representatives’ seat. He did this and pledged to give the people of the area effective and excellent representation at the National Assembly from 2019.

On 24 February 2019, Mr Onofiok Luke, a PDP candidate running for the Etinan federal constituency in the House of Representatives, became the first to be declared winner of Etinan Federal constituency by the Independent National Electoral Commission (INEC).

He polled 44,830 votes against his closest rival and former member of the House of Representatives, Mr Dan Akpan, of the APC who scored 15,800 votes.

Luke received his certificate of return to become the representative of Etinan Federal Constituency from the Independent National Electoral Commission (INEC) on 14 March 2019

== Development ==
In his local constituency, Luke’s achievements are evident in his efforts toward youth capacity-building and in his human empowerment initiatives. The two flagship schemes through which youths and women have obtained economic empowerment are the Constituency Transport Scheme and the Business startup Grants, which has improved the lot of locals and constituents who run SMEs.

More than 600 youths and women have benefited from both schemes in two years.

Luke is arguably the first and only known public official in Nigeria to run an internship program on legislative practices for young Nigerians. He founded The Onofiok Luke Legislative Internship Programme (TOLLIP) in 2013. The programme is designed to train and mentor young Nigerians on the rudiments of law-making in line with international best practices. Interns are also coached to become economically self-reliant, social volunteers, peace advocates and conflict managers. He places the interns on monthly stipends.

== National discuss ==
Luke has been vocal on national issues since 2008. He was one of the first Nigerian youths who called for Amnesty for local militants who were disrupting oil activities in the Niger Delta region of Nigeria. At a youth Town Hall meeting in Uyo in 2008, Luke led other youths to call on the Federal government to formalise an amnesty programme which he said was going to stop hostilities in the oil-rich region. The Yar'Adua administration would later in 2009 yield to the call for amnesty for the militants which brought calm to the region.

It was in the same year in Bauchi State that Onofiok warned Nigeria's federal government of the implication of not developing schools in Northern Nigeria to cater for the millions of Almajiris. He also warned concerning the failure of government to take steps to arrest the Boko Haram Islamist sect which was at the time in its embryonic stage in the northeast of the country. Palpably frustrated by government's refusal to heed to his call for urgent action, Onofiok told journalists as he brought the second session of the Youth Parliament to a close on 19 August 2009:

"At Bauchi, we called for the reform of the Almajiri system and a close watch on (the Boko Haram) sect capable of fermenting trouble; this was not heeded and recently, the nation woke up to the unpalatable Boko Haram experience."

Boko Haram went out of hand largely due to government's negligence and has since 2009 killed more than 13,000 Nigerians in the North-East and North-West of the country.

In the heat of the national debate which followed the sacking of the Governor of the Central Bank of Nigeria, Mallam Sanusi Lamido Sanusi, by President Goodluck Jonathan in 2013, Onofiok called on Nigerians to question why the CBN Governor was not producing facts to counter allegations of financial recklessness leveled against him by the presidency rather than base their disapproval of the sack on sentiments.

He has also recently been voicing the need for the Niger Delta states, the BRACED states of Nigeria, to have stronger economic and political ties in order to cater for the needs of the region as a single unit. In April 2015, Onofiok reechoed his call for economic and political synergy among states and leaders of the oil-rich, but underdeveloped, Niger Delta region. He said that in spite that his party, the People's Democratic Party (Nigeria) has lost at the centre, states in the South-South region where the party still holds sway, must come together to meet its development needs.

== Global and continental leadership engagements ==
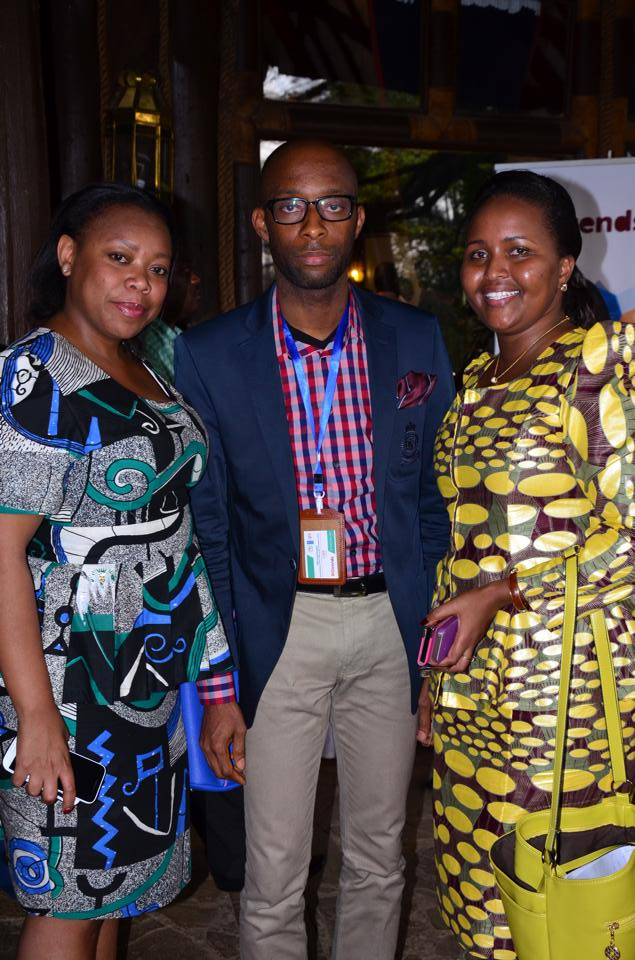
Luke with Kenyan Ambassador to Somalia, Yvonne Khamati (R), and Kenyan Senator, Naisula Lesuuda (L) on the final day of the African Union Youth Pre-forum in Nairobi in September 2014.

Luke has been on several international assignments for his country. He represented the country's youths in the 2010 World Youth Conference in Leon, Mexico. He was also Nigeria's representative at the African Union youth pre-forum to the 2014 high level dialogue on democracy, human rights, and governance in Africa. At the conference which held in Nairobi Kenya and had top-ranking African diplomats in attendance, Luke spoke on Youth, Power, and Politics for Sustainable Peace in Africa.

Luke was one of few selected Nigerian youth leaders who attended the annual leadership mentoring programme in Singapore in 2011 where he drew leadership lessons from former Singaporean leader, Mr Lee Kuan Yew and Mr Nelson Mandela, former President of South Africa.

== Religious views ==
Although raised as a Christian of the orthodox Qua Iboe Church, Luke now worships with Full Life Christian Centre in Uyo, Nigeria. He is a Born Again Christian and openly promotes the Christian doctrine of the payment of Tithes.
