= Akwa Ibom North-East senatorial district =

Senatorial District in Nigeria

Akwa Ibom North-East senatorial district in Akwa Ibom State covers nine local government areas, which are Ibiono Ibom, Itu, Uyo, Uruan, Ibesikpo Asutan, Nsit Ibom, Nsit Atai, Etinan, and Nsit Ubium. Akwa Ibom North-East is also known as Uyo, which is its headquarters. As of 2019, this district has 94 Registration Areas (RAs) and 987 polling units (PUs) and its collation centre is located at the Uyo LGA INEC office. As of 29 May 2023, Aniekan Bassey of the Peoples Democratic Party is the representative of Akwa Ibom North-East.

== List of senators representing Akwa Ibom North-East ==
Senator	Party	Year	Assembly
Akpan Udo-Udehe	PDP	1999–2003	4th
Effiong Dickson Bob	PDP	2003–2011	5th 6th
Ita Enang	PDP	2011–2015	7th
Bassey Albert	PDP	2015–2023	8th 9th
Aniekan Bassey	PDP	2023–present	10th
