= Patrick Ifon =

Nigerian politician

Patrick Nathan Ifon

Member of the House of Representatives
- In office 2019–2023
- Constituency: Eket/Onna/Esit Eket/Ibeno federal constituency

Personal details
- Born: 1958 (age 67–68) Akwa Ibom State, Nigeria
- Party: Peoples Democratic Party
- Occupation: Politician

Patrick Nathan Ifon is a Nigerian politician. He represented Eket/Onna/Esit Eket/Ibeno Federal Constituency in the House of Representatives. Born in 1958, he hails from Akwa Ibom State. He succeeded Owoidighe Ekpoatai and was elected in 2019 to the National Assembly under the Peoples Democratic Party (PDP).
