= 2007 Akwa Ibom State gubernatorial election =

State election in Nigeria

- April 14, 2007
| Nominee | Godswill Akpabio | James Iniama |
| Party | PDP | ACN |
| Popular vote | 1,044,566 | 19,865 |
Governor before election
Victor Attah
PDP
Elected Governor
Godswill Akpabio
PDP

The 2007 Akwa Ibom State gubernatorial election was the 4th gubernatorial election of Akwa Ibom State. Held on April 14, 2007, the People's Democratic Party nominee Godswill Akpabio won the election, defeating James Iniama of the Action Congress of Nigeria.

== Results ==
Godswill Akpabio from the People's Democratic Party won the election, defeating James Iniama from the Action Congress of Nigeria. Registered voters was 1,408,197.

2007 Akwa Ibom State gubernatorial election
| Party | Candidate | Votes | % | ±% |
|---|---|---|---|---|
| PDP | Godswill Akpabio | 1,044,566 | 0 | |
| ACN | James Iniama | 19,865 | 0 | |
| PDP hold | | | | |
