= Francis Uduyok =

Nigerian politician

Francis Charles Uduyok is a Nigerian politician under the Peoples Democratic Party (PDP) umbrella. He serves as the representative for the Ikot Abasi/Mkpat Enin/Eastern Obolo Federal Constituency in the Nigerian House of Representatives.

During his tenure in the House of Representatives, Francis Uduyok chaired a six-member federal committee that investigated the award of the Calabar–Itu–Ikot Ekpene road contract. The committee found that only 21.9 km of the planned 87 km road had been awarded, at a cost of ₦54 billion, indicating that the majority (65.1 km) was not awarded or funded as originally intended.
