= Emmanuel Ekpenyong =

Nigerian footballer (born 2004)

Personal information
- Full name: Emmanuel Imoh Ekpenyong
- Date of birth: 12 August 2004 (age 22)
- Place of birth: Nigeria
- Position: Left winger

Team information
- Current team: Jaro

Youth career
- Ottasolo

Senior career*
Years	Team	Apps	(Gls)
2023–2024	Doma United	15	(2)
2024	→ Örgryte (loan)	2	(0)
2025–	Jaro	0	(0)

International career
- Nigeria U20
- * Club domestic league appearances and goals as of 3 June 2025

Emmanuel Imoh Ekpenyong (born 12 August 2004) is a Nigerian professional footballer who plays as a left winger for Veikkausliiga club Jaro.

== Club career ==
Ekpenyong started his senior career playing with Doma United in top-tier Nigeria Premier Football League. In 2024 he was loaned out to Swedish Superettan club Örgryte IS where he made two appearances in the division.

In February 2025, Ekpenyong signed with newly promoted FF Jaro in Finnish Veikkausliiga.

== Career statistics ==
As of 3 June 2025

Appearances and goals by club, season and competition
Club	Season	Division	League		National cup (Note: Includes Svenska Cupen and Suomen Cup)		League cup (Note: Includes Finnish League Cup)		Continental		Total	
Club	Season	Division	Apps	Goals	Apps	Goals	Apps	Goals	Apps	Goals	Apps	Goals
Doma United	2023–24	NPFL	15	2	–		–		–		15	2
Örgryte (loan)	2024	Superettan	2	0	1	0	–		–		3	0
Jaro	2025	Veikkausliiga	0	0	2	0	2	0	–		4	0
Jaro Akademi	2025	Kolmonen	6	3	–		–		–		6	3
Career total			23	5	3	0	2	0	0	0	28	5
