= Michael Enyong =

Nigerian politician

Michael Okon Enyong

National Assembly member

Personal details
- Education: University of Uyo

Michael Okon Enyong (born 1969 in Uyo) is a Nigerian politician who represents Uyo, Uruan, Nsit Atai and Ibesikpo Asutan in the Nigerian National Assembly. Before being elected into office, he was chairman of the Akwa Ibom State Tourism Board.

In 2015, he was elected into the Nigerian National Assembly under the People's Democratic Party (Nigeria).

In February 2018, Enyong was accused of being involved in a sex scandal and impregnating a supporter. In a publication made by DailyPost he denies sexual involvement and claims the accusation to be a mudsling by political opponents.
