= 2019 Nigerian Senate elections in Akwa Ibom State =

2019 Nigerian Senate election in Akwa Ibom State

The 2019 Nigerian Senate election in Akwa Ibom State was held on 23 February 2019, to elect members of the Nigerian Senate to represent Akwa Ibom State. Bassey Albert representing Akwa Ibom North-East, Christopher Stephen Ekpenyong representing Akwa Ibom North-West and Akon Etim Eyakenyi representing Akwa Ibom South all won on the platform of Peoples Democratic Party.

== Overview ==
Affiliation	Party		Total
Affiliation	PDP	APC	Total
Before Election	1	2	3
After Election	3	0	3

== Summary ==
District	Incumbent	Party	Elected Senator	Party
Akwa Ibom South	Nelson Asuquo Effiong	APC	Akon Etim Eyakenyi	PDP
Akwa Ibom North-East	Bassey Albert	PDP	Bassey Albert	PDP
Akwa Ibom North-West	Godswill Akpabio	APC	Christopher Stephen Ekpenyong	PDP

== Results ==
=== Akwa Ibom South ===
A total of 10 candidates registered with the Independent National Electoral Commission to contest in the election. PDP candidate Akon Etim Eyakenyi won the election, defeating APC Effiong Asuquo and 8 other party candidates. Etim scored 122,412 votes, while APC candidate Effiong scored 44,053 votes.

2019 Nigerian Senate election in Akwa Ibom State
Party	Candidate	Votes	%
PDP	Akon Etim Eyakenyi	122,412	
APC	Nelson Effiong	44,053	
Others			
Total votes		167,228	100%
PDP hold			

=== Akwa Ibom Central North-East ===
A total of 13 candidates registered with the Independent National Electoral Commission to contest in the election. PDP candidate Bassey Albert Akpan won the election, defeating APC candidate Bassey Etim and 11 other party candidates. Akpan pulled 147,731 votes, while APC candidate Etim scored 60,930.

2019 Nigerian Senate election in Akwa Ibom State
Party	Candidate	Votes	%
PDP	Bassey Akpan	147,731	
APC	Bassey Etim	60,930	
Others			
Total votes		209,824	100%
PDP hold			

=== Akwa Ibom North-West ===
A total of 11 candidates registered with the Independent National Electoral Commission to contest in the election. PDP candidate Christopher Stephen Ekpenyong won the election, defeating APC candidate, Goodswill Akpabio. Ekpenyong pulled 118,215 votes while his closest rival Akpabio pulled 83,158 votes.

2019 Nigerian Senate election in Akwa Ibom State
Party	Candidate	Votes	%
PDP	Christopher Ekpenyong	118,215	
APC	Goodswill Akpabio	83,158	
Others			
Total votes		202,387	100%
PDP hold			
