= Bassey Albert Akpan =

Nigerian politician

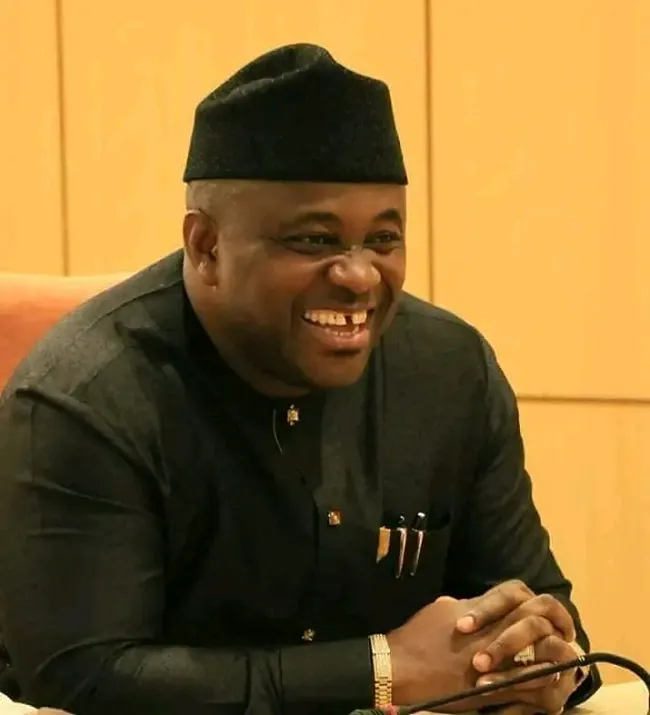

Senator of the Federal Republic of Nigeria from Akwa Ibom North-East Senatorial District
- In office 9 June 2015 – Jan 2023
- Preceded by: Ita Enang

Commissioner for Finance Akwa Ibom State, Nigeria
- In office 7 August 2007 – 24 April 2014

Personal details
- Born: 28 October 1972 (age 53) Ibiono Ibom LGA, Akwa Ibom State, Nigeria
- Party: All Progressives Congress Nigeria (APC)
- Website: www.senatoroba.org

Bassey Albert Akpan CON (born 28 October 1972) is a Nigerian politician who served as a member of the Senate of Nigeria from June 2015 to January 2023. He previously served as the Commissioner of Finance in Akwa Ibom State from 2007 to 2014. He was first elected to the Senate in March 2015, to represent the Akwa Ibom North-East Senatorial District and he won re-election in the February 2019 senatorial elections. He is a member of the Young Progressives Party (YPP).

== Background ==
Akpan was born on 28 October 1972 into the family of Chief Albert Robert Akpan, a successful businessman, prominent politician and philanthropist, in Ididep Usuk village, Ibiono Ibom Local Government Area.

He is a grassroots politician who represented Akwa Ibom North-East Senatorial District at the 8th Senate of the Federal Republic of Nigeria. Previously, he was Commissioner of Finance in Akwa Ibom State from 2007 to 2014.

He was elected to the Senate in March 2015, under the platform of the Peoples Democratic Party (PDP) and was reelected in February 2019 to represent Akwa Ibom North-East Senatorial District at the 9th Senate.

Akpan started his secondary education at St. Patrick's College, Calabar, before proceeding to the University of Uyo, where he bagged a bachelor's degree in economics (Second Class Upper Division). In further pursuit of academic excellence, he obtained a master's degree in business administration (MBA) from the prestigious University of Nigeria, Nsukka.

== Career ==
Akpan started his professional career in 1997, when he joined the International Operations and Consumer Banking/Retail Banking Unit of the United Bank for Africa (UBA). In 1999, he moved on to become Manager, Corporate Banking Group at the Continental Trust Bank at the bank's Victoria Island Lagos head office. He later joined First Inland Bank Plc in 2003 as the Uyo Branch Manager, where he won the bank's best performing branch manager award in the South-South region. He also won the award for the best performing branch manager nationwide in the bank's mid-year review of the 2004 financial year.

In 2005, he joined First City Monument Bank as Assistant Vice President, where he was the General Manager in charge of Akwa Ibom and Cross River States. He was responsible for directing and overseeing the day-to-day running of over 15 branches spread across the zone and as the zonal head, he articulated and developed key market penetration strategies for the bank, for sustainable market share and growth.

== Political career ==
In 2007, when the call to public service came through his nomination as a commissioner into the Executive Council of the Akwa Ibom State government, he accepted and was handed the Finance Ministry to manage.

With his wealth of experience in the banking sector and background as an economist, he was able to grow the state's Internally Generated Revenue (IGR), to N15.6 billion as of the last quarter of 2013.

He was also the chairman of the Inter-ministerial Direct Labour Coordinating Committee whose job was to ensure that government projects were completed using direct labour to save funds for the state. He saw through the successful completion of over 6000 life-touching projects in the health and education sectors, as well as areas of rural and human capital development.

In April 2009, Akpan chaired the first-ever Akwa Ibom State Revenue Summit. The summit with the theme "Maximising Internally Generated Revenue (IGR) potentials in Akwa Ibom State - A Collective Responsibility" had in attendance stakeholders from diverse socio-economic sectors in the state and was organised as part of strategic efforts to boost the Internally Generated Revenue (IGR) of the state.

He was instrumental in the negotiations between the state and Standard Chartered Bank for the approval of a loan of £325.24m to execute projects in the state

In 2014, Akpan declared his intention to contest for the governorship seat of Akwa Ibom State. Even though he was a front-line aspirant, he decided to respect, as a loyal party man, the zoning policy of his party (PDP), which paved the way for Eket Senatorial District to produce Udom Gabriel Emmanuel as Governor of the State. He contested and won the senatorial seat under the PDP in 2015.

== Senate career ==
Akpan was sworn in as a senator of the Federal Republic of Nigeria, on 9 June 2015.

Akpan distinguished himself in character and performance at the Senate, with the sponsorship of several bills, motions, petitions and other matters of strategic relevance, not minding the fact he was a first-timer.

He moved a motion on the floor of the Senate to look into the state of the Ikot Ekpene - Itu - Calabar highway which had been abandoned for years and was in a state of disrepair. This led the Senate to inaugurate a committee of which he was a member. On 12 October 2015, his election was upheld by the appeal court which confirmed him as the senator representing Akwa Ibom North East senatorial district. He was also appointed as the Chairman of the Senate Committee on Gas Resources by the 8th Senate President, Bukola Saraki.

His committee turned down a proposal of N200 million in the budget of the Ministry of Petroleum Resources for the preparation of the Petroleum Industry Bill (PIB). The committee also rejected a request for an appropriation of N200 million for the review of Nigeria Gas Master Plan, describing it as unnecessary.

He chaired the Senate Committee on Gas Resources, whose contribution to the development of the Nigerian oil and gas sector cannot be overemphasised, one of such being the "Gas Flaring Penalty and Prohibition Bill" passed by the Senate of the Federal Republic of Nigeria.

He was disqualified from the senate on 27 February 2017 by the High Court of Nigeria, which nullified his election to the Senate. On 30 November 2017, after several investigations and court hearings, the Court of Appeal in Calabar overturned the ruling by the Federal High Court in Uyo, and declared Akpan the winner of the primary election that was conducted in December 2014.

In May 2016, Akpan initiated an undergraduate scholarship scheme, which 381 students of Akwa Ibom State origin have so far benefited from. The scholarship covers full tuition fees and an upkeep allowance throughout the duration of the beneficiary's programme. As of the beginning of the 2019/2020 academic session, 114 have successfully graduated and obtained degrees, while 267 are still on their respective programmes in various higher institutions of learning across Nigeria.

His unparalleled performance in his first term propelled the people of Uyo Senatorial District (Akwa Ibom North-East) to overwhelmingly vote for him to return to the National Assembly as Senator of the Federal Republic of Nigeria, in the 2019 General elections.

In the 9th Senate, he was appointed chairman of the Committee on Upstream Petroleum Resources, and a member of several other committees by the 9th Senate President H.E. Ahmad Ibrahim Lawan.

Other legislative duties

- Member, Ad-hoc Committee on Works.
- Member, Ad-hoc committee on the 2013 Audit Report of the Nigerian Extractive Industry.
- Member, Joint Committee on Petroleum Upstream and Gas to investigate the utilisation of the Nigerian Content Development Fund.
- Member, Committee on Legislative Compliance.
- Member, Ad-hoc Committee on Import Duty Waivers, Concessions and Grants.
- Member, Joint Committee on Petroleum Downstream, Petroleum Upstream and Gas on the 2016 budget of NNPC.
- Member, Joint Committee on Health, Agriculture and Rural Development in respect of a motion on the ban on Nigerian agricultural products by the European Union.
- Member, ad hoc committee on petition from Dr. George Uboh of Panic Alert Security System (PASS) against Chevron Nig. Limited for fraud of over 4 billion naira.
- Member, Joint Committee on Petroleum Upstream, Petroleum Downstream and Gas on the Petroleum Industry Governance Bill (PIGB).
- Chairman, Joint Committee on Gas, Petroleum Upstream, Finance and Appropriation on the implementation of Joint Cash Calls Obligation by NNPC from 2011-2015

== Corruption allegations ==
=== Car bribery ===
In May 2017, the Economic and Financial Crimes Commission detained Akpan over cars that he had allegedly received as a bribe from Jide Omokore years beforehand while he was Akwa Ibom Finance Commissioner and Chairman of the State Inter-Ministerial Direct Labour Coordinating Committee. Reporting showed that the Omokore's companies – Bay Atlantic Energy and Sahel Energy – received contracts from the Direct Labour Coordinating Committee and the EFCC claimed the vehicles were used to bribe Akpan. Akpan called the detainment and investigation politically motivated and claimed to have filed a suit against the EFCC for breaching his fundamental human rights.

In August 2018, the EFCC filed charges against Akpan and Omokore in the High Court of Lagos State for corruption and bribery. The case was later tossed out by Justice O.A. Taiwo due to jurisdictional issues based on the defence's argument that the case should have been brought in Akwa Ibom not Lagos State.

=== False asset declaration ===
In June 2018, charges were filed against Akpan for failing to declare his true assets after an investigation by the Special Presidential Investigation Panel on the Recovery of Public Property (SPIP) which accused Akpan of failing to disclose his ownership or the true cost of several houses. Akpan labelled the charges a plot to tarnish his image and bound to fail.

=== Petroleum Industry Bill bribes ===
After the passage of the Petroleum Industry Bill (PIB) in August 2021, Akpan was accused of facilitating the bribery of federal legislators to guarantee the legislation's advancement despite significant public opposition to parts of the text. According to Peoples Gazette reporting, at least $10 million was paid to legislators in payments organised by Akpan and Minister of State for Petroleum Resources Timipre Sylva with between $1.5 million and $2 million going to both Senate President Ahmad Lawan and House Speaker Femi Gbajabiamila. Multiple legislators corroborated the story with several legislators expressing anger, not that the Gbajabiamila and Lawan allegedly took bribes but instead that the bribes were not shared equally among the legislators as other legislators claimed to have received $5,000 for representatives and $20,000 for senators. Gbajabiamila, Lawan, Sylva, and Akpan all declined to comment on the story.

== Honours and awards ==
- Award of Excellence, the Chartered Institute of Taxation of Nigeria (CITN) Uyo and District Society (2009)
- Award of Honour, Ibiono Ibom Welfare and Development Union (IWADU – 2009). Traditional Title of "Enin Ibiono Ibom" (Elephant of Ibiono Ibom) by Ibiono-Ibom Traditional Rulers Council (2009)
- Fellow, Nigerian Association of Teachers of Technology (2010)
- Golden Award by Lions Club International for Service to Humanity (2011)
- The Paul Harris Fellow Award by Rotary Club International in recognition of Service to Humanity (2011)
- Award of chieftaincy title of "Iberedem Ididep" (Rock of Ididep) by Clan Head of Ididep
- Honorary Award of Excellence by the National Association of Akwa Ibom State Students (NAAKISS) 2013
- Associate Member of the Chartered Institute of Taxation of Nigeria (CITN) 2013.
- Honorary Fellow of the Institute of Project Managers of Nigeria (2013).
- Fellow of the National Association of Research Development (FNARD) (2013)
- Patron of Christian Council of Nigeria (2013)
- Chairman, Akwa Ibom State Golf Association (2013) Golden Public Service Award by the Nigerian Society of Engineers, Uyo Branch (2013)
- Award of Excellence by the Foundation for Sound and Intervention (FASMACIN) (2013)
- Award of Honour’ presented by National Association of Ibiono Ibom Students, University of Calabar Chapter (NAIBS – UCC), (April 2014)
- Award of Excellence’ Presented by Forum of Past Student Leaders, University of Uyo, (March 2014)
- Patriotism Award by Mboho Mkparawa Ibibio (November 7, 20105)
- Award of Chieftaincy Title of “Obong Uforo Akwa Ibom State (Monarch of Prosperity of Akwa Ibom State) by the Paramount Ruler of Etinan and Chairman, Akwa Ibom State Council of Chiefs, His Majesty Edidem Dickson Umoette
- Patriotic Service Award of Excellence for Scholarship Achievement by Patriotic Service Platform (November, 2016)
- Prestigious Award of the South South Senator of the Year 2017 by Senate Press Corp. (October, 2017)
- Fellowship Award in Recognition of Meritorious Service to Humanity and Akwa Ibom State Polytechnic by the Governing Council and Management of Akwa Ibom State Polytechnic (May, 2019).
- Educational Endowment and Philanthropic Award by Governing Council and Academic Board of College of Education, Afaha Nsit, Akwa Ibom State (July 12, 2019).
- Ibom Pride Award of Excellence by Akwa Ibom State Association of Nigeria, US, INC., (AKISAN) (August 1, 2019)
- In October 2022, a Nigerian national honour of Commander of the Order of the Niger (CON) was conferred on him by President Muhammadu Buhari.

Utuen ikang mkparawa was given to him by Nsit Ibom youths.
