= African Action Congress =

Political party in Nigeria

- Leader: Omoyele Sowore
- Secretary: Oshiokhue Philip Ikpeminoghena
- Spokesperson: Rex I. Elanu
- Founder: Omoyele Sowore
- Founded: 15 August 2018
- Headquarters: House TD7, Global Estate, Apo Primary, FCT-Abuja
- Ideology: Pan-Africanism; Anti-imperialism; Eco-socialism; Anti-capitalism
- Political position: Left-wing
- National affiliation: Coalition for Revolution (CORE)
- International affiliation: Progressive International (via the Coalition for Revolution (CORE))

Website
- aacparty.org

African Action Congress (AAC) is a left-wing, Nigerian political party founded in 2018, by Omoyele Sowore, the founder and publisher of Sahara Reporters.

The slogan of the party is: Take it back. The party's National Chairman recognized by INEC is Omoyele Sowore. On Monday 13 May 2019, AAC announced expulsion of Leonard Nzenwa and suspension of other individuals for financial impropriety and anti-party activities.
