= Daily Post (Nigeria) =

Nigerian online news website

- Type: Daily newspaper
- Publisher: Daily Post Media Ltd
- Editor: Emmanuel Uzodinma
- Deputy editor: Ameh Comrade Godwin
- Associate editor: Chika Onyesi
- Founded: 2011
- Language: English
- Headquarters: Lagos, Nigeria
- Website: dailypost.ng

Daily Post is a Nigerian newspaper published by Daily Post Media Ltd., based in Lagos. It reports on local and national news, politics, metro, business, entertainment, sports and opinions.

In March 2015, the newspaper debuted the free distribution of its print version across Nigeria.

== Awards and nominations ==
Daily Post Nigeria won the "Custodian of the Nigerian Dream" Award in 2016.
