= Umo Eno =

Nigerian politician and clergy (born 1964)

His Excellency Umo Eno

Governor of Akwa Ibom State
- Incumbent
- Assumed office 29 May 2023
- Deputy: Akon Eyakenyi
- Preceded by: Udom Emmanuel

Akwa Ibom State Commissioner for Lands and Water Resources
- In office 2021–2022

Personal details
- Born: 24 April 1964 (age 62) Nsit-Ubium, Eastern Region, Nigeria (now in Akwa Ibom State)
- Party: All Progressives Congress
- Education: University of Uyo
- Occupation: Politician; businessman

Umo Bassey Eno (born 24 April 1964) is a Nigerian clergyman and politician who is the Governor of Akwa Ibom State, Nigeria. He was the former Commissioner for Lands and Water Resources in Akwa Ibom State, and the founder of All Nations Christian Ministry International.

== Early life and education ==
Eno was born on 24 April 1964, in his hometown, Ikot Ekpene Udo in Nsit-Ubium Local Government Area of Akwa Ibom State, Nigeria. He attended Local Authority Primary School in Lagos State, where he got his first school leaving certificate. He also attended St. Francis Secondary School in Eket, Akwa Ibom State and Victory High School in Ikeja, Lagos State, for his secondary education. He obtained a Bachelor's degree in Public Administration from the University of Uyo and later a Master's degree in the same field.

== Career ==
After his secondary school education, he worked at Union Bank for some years before moving to Bertola Machine Tools Nigeria Limited and then to Norman Holdings Limited, where he became the chief executive officer (CEO) before setting up Royalty Groups, which belongs to him. In 2021, he was appointed Commissioner for Lands and Water Resources in Akwa Ibom State by Governor Udom Emmanuel and later resigned from the position to run for the governorship. He won the election and became governor under the platform of the PDP, but on June 6, 2025, he announced his defection to the All Progressive Congress.

== Awards and Honours ==
- National Merit Award for Change and Good Leadership
- Award for Service to the Community
- Highly Productive Company Award (Private Sector)
- Gold Service Award for Professionalism in Hotel Management
- Honorary Member, World Conference of Mayors
- Meritorious Award for Leadership Role and Service
- Excellence Award for Public Administration
- Obong Unwana of Nsit Ubium (traditional title)
- Highest Employer of Labour/Human Development Award
- Outstanding Contribution to Tourism Development Award
- Certificate of Excellence (ExxonMobil)
- Highest Employer of Labour/Human Development Award
- Leadership Newspaper – Governor of the Year
- THISDAY – Governor of the Year 2024
- Nigerian Governors' Forum – Governor of the Year 2025
- Nigeria Police Force Award of Excellence
- Tourism-Friendly Governor Award
