= Obot-Akara =

- LGA
- Interactive map of Obot-Akara
- Location in Nigeria
- Coordinates: 5°16′0″N 7°36′0″E
- Country: Nigeria
- State: Akwa Ibom State
- Headquarter: Nto Edino
- Local Government Area: Obot Akara

Government
  - Executive Chairman: Hon. Lady Agnes Udoenwenwen

Area
  - Land: 237 km^{2} (92 sq mi)

Population (2006)
  - Total: 148,281
  - Density: 626/km^{2} (1,620/sq mi)
- Time zone: UTC+1 (WAT)

Obot-Akara is in the south of Nigeria and is a Local Government Area of Akwa Ibom State whose headquarters is located at Nto Edino.

It is inhabited by the Anaangs ethnic group. It shares borders with Ikwuano.

== Political Wards ==
Wards	Ward Centers
Ikot Abia 1	St. Theresa’s Primary School, Ikot Ukpong
Ikot Abia 2	Primary School, Nto Eton
Ikot Abia 3	Primary School, Obon Ukwa
Obot Akara 1	Comprehensive High School, Ikpe Mbak Eyop 1
Obot Akara 2	Village Hall, Ikpe Usung Ita
Obot Akara 3	Methodist Secondary School, Nto Ndang
Obot Akara 4	St. Columbanus Secondary School, Ikwen
Nto Edino 1	Q.I.C Primary School, Nto Ide Anwa Effiat
Nto Edino 2	Government School, Ibong Otoro
Nto Edino 3	St. Andrew’s Primary School, Nto Edino Obot Idim
Nto Edino 4	Community School, Ikot Ukana
