= Nsit-Ibom =

Nsit Ibom
- LGA
- Interactive map of Nsit Ibom
- Location in Nigeria
- Coordinates: 4°53′0″N 7°54′0″E
- Country: Nigeria
- State: Akwa Ibom State
- Capital: Afaha Effiong

Government
  - Chairman: Hon. Deaconess Otobong Sunny Aaron

Area
  - Total: 144.6 km^{2} (55.8 sq mi)

Population (2022)
  - Total: 137,900
  - Density: 953.7/km^{2} (2,470/sq mi)
- Time zone: UTC+1 (WAT)

Nsit Ibom is a local government area in Akwa Ibom State, Nigeria, it shares common boundaries with Ibesikpo Asutan, Etinan, Nsit Ubium and Uyo Local Government Areas. The people of Nsit Ibom are of the Ibibio ethnic extraction.

Nsit Ibom has a male population of 57,750 and a female population of 50,861 for a total of 108,611 according to the 2006 National Census.

September 1991 In September 1991, the present Nsit Ibom Local Government Area was carved out leaving Nsit Ubium with its present two clans — Nsit and Ubium with 65 recognised villages and some other villages which are in existence.

== Urban Communities ==
Nsit Ibom comprises the following urban communities: Afaha Offiong, Edeobom, Obo Ikot Ita, Oboetim Ikot Ekong, Mbiokporo Nsit, Ikot Ntuen Nsit, Mbiaso, Afaha Nsit. It has 2 sub-clans: Asang and Mbiaso. The Akwa Ibom State College of Education (AKSCOE), is located at Afaha Nsit, Mbiaso. The late Bishop D. J. Umondak, a Bishop of the Christ Holy Sanctified Church and the founder of Nsit Peoples Grammar School, Afaha Offiong hailed from this local government.

Nsit Ibom has its headquarters in Afaha Offiong.

== Tertiary Institutions in Nsit Ibom ==
1. Akwa Ibom State College of Education, Afaha Nsit
2. Maurid Polytechnic, Mbiaso
3. Nice Polytechnic, Afaha Offiong

== Political Background ==
Nsit Ibom presently has a new political dispensation consisting of youths and wealthy personalities enhancing development. Maj. Gen. Paul J Isang RTD, Hon. Eric Effiong Akpan and Deaconess Otobong Sunny Aaron, had been working hand in hand with the people of Nsit Ibom towards a strategic development. They also thrive to reunite the People into one APC group after the official Defection of the Executive Governor Pastor Umo BASSEY Eno from PDP to the APC. Nsit Ibom has also developed from grassroot level, which is being used to disseminate the dividends of democracy to the poor indigenous people.

Major General Paul John Isang RTD after his defection from the PDP, is the present APC political leader of the Local Government Area, Hon. Eric Akpan is the current member representing the state constituents in the 8th Assembly of the Akwa Ibom State House of Assembly and he doubles as the Chairman of the House Committee on Public Accounts, while Deaconess Otobong Sunny Aaron is currently the Executive Council Chairman.

== Political Wards ==
Wards	Ward Centers
Asang 1	St. Louis Pri. Sch., Mbiokporo 1
Asang 2	Primary School, Ekpene Ikpan
Asang 3	Apostolic Church Sec. Sch., Ikot Oku Nsit
Asang 4	Comprehensive Sec. Sch, Obotim
Asang 5	Primary Sch., Ikot Obok/Obo Etok
Mbiaso 1	Lutheran Pri. School, Afaha Offiong
Mbiaso 2	Q.I.C. Primary Sch., Afaha Nsit/Mbiokporo 2
Mbiaso 3	Comp. Secondary School, Edebom
Mbiaso 4	Sec. Sch., Ikot Nya
Mbiaso 5	Adult Edu. Centre, Ikot Obio Etan
Mbiaso 6	Primary Sch., Mbiaso
