= Itu, Nigeria =

Itu
- LGA
- Interactive map of Itu
- Location in Nigeria
- Coordinates: 5°10′0″N 7°59′0″E
- Country: Nigeria
- State: Akwa Ibom State
- Headquarters: Mbak Atai Itam

Government
  - Type: Democratic

Area
  - Total: 195.3 km^{2} (75.4 sq mi)

Population (2022)
  - Total: 163,200
  - Density: 835.6/km^{2} (2,164/sq mi)
- Time zone: UTC+1 (WAT)

Itu is located in the South South of Nigeria and is a Local Government Area of Akwa Ibom State. The Local Government Area occupies a landmass of approximately 200 square kilometres. It is bounded in the North and North-East by Odukpani in Cross River State and Arochukwu in Abia State, in the West by Ibiono Ibom and Ikono Local Government Areas, in the South and southeast by Uyo and Uruan Local Government Areas, respectively.

== Economy of the Itu Local Government Area ==
Farming is a major occupation in Itu Local Government Area with various harvests, for example, gmelina, raffia palm, oil palm, and plantain filled nearby. Additionally, a few mineral stores are found in Itu Local Government Area and these incorporate raw petroleum, salt, limestone, and rock. Fishing is also one more basic element of the economy of Itu Local Government Area with the space's numerous waterways being wealthy in fish. Other significant ventures embraced by individuals of Itu Local Government Area incorporate exchange and stumbling. Itu Local government council's Secretariat been located in Mbak Atai Itam beside at Calabar-Itu Highway road that linked to Cross River State. Itu Local Government Area became established by military administrator, LT. Col Yakubu Bako on 17 May 1994.

== Notable people ==
- Emem Eduok (born 1994), footballer

== Political Wards ==
| Wards | Ward Centers |
|---|---|
| Oku Iboku 1 | Primary School, Ikot Abiyak |
| Itu clan ward 2 | Village Square, Mbarakom |
| Mbiase/Ayadehe | Primary School, Ikot Akpabio |
| East Itam 1 | Primary School, Ibiaku Ikot Obong |
| East Itam 2 | Primary School, Akon Itam |
| East Itam 3 | Itam Secondary School, Obong Itam |
| East Itam 4 | East Itam Primary School, Nkim |
| East Itam 5 | Primary School, Mbak Atai |
| West Itam 1 | Government Primary School, Afaha Ube |
| West Itam 2 | Primary School, Nung Ukot Itam |
| West Itam 3 | Community Secondary School, Ibiaku Itam I |
