= Ikono =

- LGA
- Interactive map of Ikono
- Coordinates: 5°12′37″N 7°47′38″E
- Country: Nigeria
- State: Akwa Ibom State
- Headquarters: Ibiaku Ntuk Okpo

Government
  - Type: Local Government Area
  - Chairman: Hon. Oto-Obong Okon Essien

Area
  - Total: 197.4 km^{2} (76.2 sq mi)

Population (2022)
  - Total: 168,000
  - Density: 851/km^{2} (2,200/sq mi)
- Time zone: UTC+1 (WAT)

Ikono Audiois a Local Government Area of Akwa Ibom State, located in the South South of Nigeria. It is bounded at the North, by Ini Local Government Area, South by Abak and Uyo Local Government Areas, East by Ibiono Ibom Local Government Area and West by Ikot Ekpene, Essien Udim and Obot Akara Local Government Areas. It was created as a local government in September 1996. It has a landmass of 407.16 square kilometres (157.21 square miles). It is no doubt one of the four largest LGA in Akwa Ibom, and also known as the cradle of the Ibibio people [Ntippe Ibibio]. It occupies the northern fringe of Akwa-Ibom State next to Ini local Government which occupies the northern most fringe of the state. It is predominantly inhabited by the Ibibios, the largest ethnic groups in the state. Some popular sub-groups within Ikono include Ukpom, Itak, Nung Ukim and Ediene.

== Population ==
Males	Females	Total
69,501	62,403	131,904

Source: 2006 National Census

== Sub-cultural groups ==
Ibibio is made up of six sub-cultural groups.

These include:

1. Eastern Ibibio or Ibibio Proper.
2. Western Ibibio or Annang.
3. Northern Ibibio or Enyong.
4. Southern Ibibio or Eket.
5. Delta Ibibio or Andoni-lbeno.
6. Riverine Ibibio or Efik.

== Economy ==
The economy of Ikono LGA is largely blazed by the civil service. Ikono LGA has stores of mineral assets like salt, sand and rock. Also, there are convincing indicators for unrefined petroleum. Agriculture is likewise a significant financial action in Ikono LGA with yields. For example, oil palm, kola nut, cocoa, melon, maize, cassava, and plantain filled in genuinely huge amounts inside the space.Exchange additionally prospers in Ikono LGA with the space facilitating various business sectors like the Obo daily market. Further more, the Fiongaran market situated a few kilometres away from the boundary community at the northern terrain has over the years been a major economic contributor. The people of Ikono in mild passivity participate in fishing, cottage craft [at Mbiabong Ikon, Mbiabong Ukan and other places] and lumbering.

== Ikono towns and villages ==
The Ikono Local Government, Akwa Ibom State, Nigeria Consist of nine (9) towns which include the following
	Towns	VILLAGES
1	Aka Ekpeme District	Aka Ekpeme
2	Nung-Ukim District	Nung Ukim Ikot Akpa-Etok, Nung Ukim Ikot Etefia, Mbiafun Nkwono, Nung Ukim Ikot Mkpe, Ndiya Etok, Nung Ukim Ikot Udom, Nung Ukim Ikot Okori, Nung Ukim Ikot Uko, Nung Ukim Ikot Abia.
3	Ikono South District	Ukpom Usung Ubom, Nkwod Ikot Edem-Udo, Ibahachi Ukpom Unya, Ibahachi-Ikot-Mbiet, Mbiabong Ikot-Ete Udoe, Mbiabon Ikot-Ntia, Mbiabong-Ukan, Ekpene Obom Nkwongo, Nkwod Ikot-Imo, Nkwod Ikot-Inyang, Ukpom Ita, Ukpom Atai Essien, Ukpom Ekpene-Inuen, Ukpom Ibahachi-Ikot Ekang, Ukpom Ikot Akpakpan, Ukpom Ikot Anwana Abasi, Ukpom Ikot Ekem, Ukpom Ikot Etim, Ukpom Ikot Ntuen, Ukpom Ikot Nya, Ukpom Ikot Nyoho, Ukpom Ikot Odung, Ukpom Ikot Okure, Ukpom Ikot Udo Nkemfon Nkwod Ikot Nseyen, Nung imo, Akpeto, Ikot Esen.

== Political Wards ==
Wards	Ward Centers
Nkwot 1	St. Mary Primary School, Ikot Nseyen
Nkwot 2	Village Hall Nkwot Ikot Obok Idem
Ndiya/Ikot Idaha	Govt Primary Sch., Ikot Odu Ndiya
Itak	Holy Child Primary Sch., Nung Udoe Itak
Ediene 1	Primary School, Aka Ekpene Mbat
Ediene 2	PCN School, Ekpene Ediene
Ikono South 1	Comp. Sec. Sch., Ukpom I
Ikono South 2	Methodist Central School, Ukpom Anwana
Ikono Middle 1	Government School, Ikot Etefia
Ikono Middle 2	Govt. Sch., Iton Odoro
Ikono Middle 3	Govt. Sch., Ibiaku Ikot Ukana
Ikono Middle 4	Unity High School, Mbiabong Ukan
