= Esit Eket =

Town and Local Government Area of Akwa Ibom State, southern Nigeria

Esit Eket Esit Ekid
- LGA and town
- Interactive map of Esit Eket
- Location within Nigeria
- Coordinates: 4°39′38″N 8°04′0″E
- Country: Nigeria
- State: Akwa Ibom State

Government
  - Chairman: Iniobong R. Namnso

Area
  - Total: 148.2 km^{2} (57.2 sq mi)

Population (2022)
  - Total: 80,900
  - Density: 546/km^{2} (1,410/sq mi)
- Time zone: UTC+1 (WAT)

Esit Eket (audio)is a town and Local Government Area of Akwa Ibom State, southern Nigeria.

The administrative center of Esit Eket Local Government Area is situated in the town of Uquo, which is located within the Akwa Ibom South Senatorial Zone of the state, the Local Government Area comprises Uquo, Etebi, Akoiyak, Atia, Ekpene Obo, Ikpa, Edo, Akpautong, Afaha Ekpene Edi, Ntak Iyang, Odoro Nkit, Udua Akok, Uqua Isi Edoho, and Ebe Ekpi as its constituent areas.

Esit Eket Local Government is highlighted on the country's map. There is a growing advocacy for the establishment of a development commission to address the needs of oil-producing communities in Akwa Ibom. This information is sourced from an article by Cletus Ukpong.

== State Assembly Members ==
Three State Assembly Members serve as your representatives in the Akwa Ibom State Assembly. They are responsible for various areas, including budget, culture, sport and tourism, health, planning, transport, and roads.

Here are the representatives and their constituencies:

1. David Lawrence Udofa - Represents Eket under the Peoples Democratic Party.
2. Nse Udofot Essien - Represents Onna under the Peoples Democratic Party
3. Usoro Samuel Akpanusoh - Represents Esit Eket/Ibeno under the Peoples Democratic Party.

== Federal House of Reps. Members ==
One Representative serves the Eket/Esit Eket/Onna/Ibeno constituency in the Federal House of Representatives, which is the Lower House of the national legislature. The House of Representatives is tasked with legislating for the country and overseeing various aspects of government.

Etteh Okpolupm Ikpong, a member of the Peoples Democratic Party, represents this constituency.

== Senator ==
One Senator represents the Eket/Esit Eket/Onna/Ibeno constituency in the Senate, which is the Upper House of the legislative branch. The Senate is responsible for examining proposed legislation and the national budget, as well as supervising the activities of other governmental decision-making bodies.

The Senator for this constituency is Akpan Ekong Sampson, a member of the Peoples Democratic Party, representing Akwa Ibom South.

== Districts ==
- Uquo
- Etebi
- Akoiyak
- Atia
- Ekpene Obo
- Ikpa
- Afaha Ekpene Edi
- Ntak Iyang
- Odoro Nkit
- Udua Akok
- Uqua Isi Edoho
- Edo
- Akpautong
- Ebe Ekpi

== Political Wards ==
Wards	Ward Centers
Ekpene Obo	Eket Modern High School, Ekpene Obo
Edo 1	Village Square, Edo Atai
Edo 2	Health Centre, Oniok Edo
Ebe Ekpi	Primary School, Ebe Ekpi
Ikpa	Government Primary School, Ikpa
Uquo	Holy Cross Primary School, Uquo
Ebighi Okpono	Local Government Education Authority Premises
Etebi Idung Assan	Primary School, Etebi Idung Assan
Etebi Akwata	Primary School, Akwata
Akpautong	Primary School, Akpautong
Ntak Inyang	St. Theresa’s Primary School, Ntak Inyang
