= Nsit-Ubium =

Local Government Area of Akwa Ibom State

- LGA
- Interactive map of Nsit-Ubium
- Location in Nigeria
- Coordinates: 4°46′0″N 7°56′0″E
- Country: Nigeria
- State: Akwa Ibom State
- Capital: Ikot Edibon

Government
  - Chairman: Arc.Iniobong Orok

Area
  - Total: 205.2 km^{2} (79.2 sq mi)

Population (2022)
  - Total: 162,200
  - Density: 790.4/km^{2} (2,047/sq mi)
- Time zone: UTC+1 (WAT)

Nsit-Ubium is in the south south of Nigeria and is a Local Government Area of Akwa Ibom State. It is commonly referred to as Nsit amongst others (Nsit Atai, Nsit Ibom and Nsit Ubium) by the akwaibomites.

== History ==
Nsit Ubium Local Government Area was carved out of the then Etinan Local Government on May 3, 1989, with its headquarters at Ikot Edibon. In September 1991, the present Nsit Ibom Local Government Area was carved out leaving Nsit Ubium with its present two clans — Nsit and Ubium with 65 recognised villages and some other villages which are in existence. It is located at about 6 km East of Eket, Okobo, Nsit Ibom, Etinan, Ibesipko/Asutan and Nsit Atai Local Government Areas. shears common boundary with Nsit Ibom and Eket Local government It is well drained by the Qua Ibo River which has tributaries scattered in many locations in the area. Nsit Ubium covers a land mass of 242.942 sq kin; and located 6 km East of Eket. The topography of the Local Government is undulating with shallow depressions, dry valleys and few rivers, which lie far apart between the predominant plains. Marshes and swamps influenced by the Qua Iboe River traverse a large portion of the Local Government Area. Nsit Ubium is under Uyo Senatorial District in Akwa Ibom North East.

== People ==
Nsit Ubium consists of two Clans — Nsit and Ubium; with 31 villages in Nsit clan and 33 in Ubium clan. Traditionally, the two clans, Nsit and Ubium, identify themselves along ethnic lineage. Ubium has three groups — Ise, Afaha and Ukat, while Nsit is divided into Ibiakpan, Obotim, Nduo Eduo and Afia Nsit groups. The people are generally very hospitable, knowledgeable and industrious. They have common boundaries with some local governments such as Nsit Ibom, Eket and Oron.

== Population ==
Males	Females	Total
68,163	60,068	128,231

According to 2006 National Census

== Political Wards ==
Wards	Ward Centers
Ibiakpkan Obotim 1	Primary School, Ikot Akpabin
Ibiakpkan Obotim 2	Adiaha Obong Girls Secondary School, Ikot Imo
Itreto	Secondary School, Ikot Okobo
Ndiya 1	Primary School, Ikot Inyang Eti
Ndiya 2	Sec. Com. Sch., Ikot Etukudo
Ubium North 1	Secondary School, Ikot Eyo
Ubium North 2	Secondary School, Ikot Okwot
Ubium North 3	Secondary School, Ndukpoise
Ubium South 1	Salvation Army primary School, Ikot Ubo
Ubium South 2	Secondary School, Akai
Ubium South 3	Primary, School, Ikot Okoro
