= Ikot Inuen =

- Town
- Location in Nigeria
- Coordinates: 4.67042°N 7.61998°E
- Country: Nigeria
- State: Akwa Ibom
- Local government area: Oruk Anam
- Clan: Abak/Midim

Ikot Inuen is a town in southern Abak/Midim Clan in Oruk Anam LGA of Akwa Ibom State. It is bounded in the south by Edemaya Clan of Ikot Abasi. It is located on Nigeria's East-West road that links Port Harcourt to Ikot Abasi. It marks the linguistic transition zone between the Annang and Ibibio speaking ethnic groups of Akwa Ibom State. Being part of the Anam political unit of Oruk Anam LGA, Ikot Inuen was part of the Opobo Division from the precolonial era until 1967, when it was moved to the newly created South Eastern State, which was later renamed Cross River State. Ikot Inuen is among the communities that is climatically influenced by Imo River (also locally called Imoh River) that separates Rivers State from Akwa Ibom State of Nigeria. The area is rich in arable farmland, which makes farming the occupation of about half of the populace. Others are involved in petty trading, artisanship, and civil service. The area is rich in crude oil deposits, as evidenced in the corked oil well belonging to Shell Petroleum at Efut Idim Etok, also known as Idim aShell. In academics, the area has a public Primary School, The St Jude's Catholic School, and a public Secondary School, The Community Secondary School. The Ukoessien Central Market boasts commercial activities in the area. Apart from the first church, the St Jude's Catholic Church, established in 1919, other churches in the community include the Methodist Church, the Christ Army Church, the Samuel Spiritual Church, the Apostolic Church, the Mount Zion Mission, the Assemblies of God Church, the Deeper Life Bible Church, the Wings of Redemption Ministries and the Redeemed Christian Church of God.

== Transport and Communication ==
Ikot Inuen is served by both a major road, the Nigeria's East West Road, and other trunk C road networks, notably the Ikot Inuen - Edemaya road, the Ikot Inuen - Ikot Esenam road, the Ikot Inuen - Ikot Obio Asan - Anam road, and others. There is full telecommunication service provided in the town as there is a Base Transceiver Station, popularly called Telecommunication Mast, built by MTN in the community.

== History ==
Ikot Inuen was founded by two hunters from Manta village, a neighbouring village that shares common boundaries with it. History has it that their migratory route could be traced from the greater ancestral Manta village in Abak Local Government Area, settled first in Ikot Inyang Ekparakwa, then moved southwards to Ikot Ukpongeren, and then to the new lesser Manta village. Ikot Inuen literally means 'The habitation of birds'.

== Culture ==
The rich cultural heritage of Ikot Inuen is reflected through traditional folklores and dances. Although the majority of the populace claims adherence to the Christian faith, relics of some cultural institutions, such as Ekpe, Ekpo, Atat (Atáàd) and Ekong (Ekóòñ) still exists. The annual Founder's Day, known as Inuen Day, is celebrated on the third "Atim" Market day of October, yearly. It is a week-long event involving the presentation of seminars by notable indigenes, clearing of the traditional route, the display of the Ekpe and Inuen masquerades, traditional dances and other activities. It culminates in the celebration of the New Yam Festival, and the 'appearance' of the 'spirit-beings', known as Ekpo Ndök.

== Language ==
The people of Ikot Inuen speaks a mixture of the Annang and Ibibio languages.

== Leadership ==
Eteidung Apostle Linus Ufot Ekaidien is the Village Head. He joined his ancestors in 2018. The current village head is Eteidung Dr Michael Justine James Umoh, KSJ, a Knight of the Catholic Church.

In 1963 it had a population of 1,515 people.
