= Asanga, Nigeria =

Nung Ikot Asanga
- Town
- Etymology: Ilung Annang
- Location of Asanga in Nigeria
- Coordinates: 04°53′34″N 07°43′34″E
- Country: Nigeria
- State: Akwa Ibom State
- LGA: Oruk Anam
- Elevation: 252 m (827 ft)
- Time zone: UTC+1 (WAT)

Asanga also known as Nung Ikot Asanga is a town located in the Nung Ikot Clan, Oruk Anam local government area of Akwa Ibom State, the southern region of Nigeria.

Nung Ikot Asanga also called Asanga Town is among the Annang ethnical group of Akwa Ibom State. The town is subdivided into five villages: Ataessien, Ikot Enuah, Ikot Akpanang, Ikot Oboho and Ikot Eweh.

It shares some common boundaries with Ikot Okoro, Ntak Ibesit, Obiakpa. Others include Ikot Afanga, and Nung Ikot Obiodo.

== Nearby cities ==
- Abak in the north
- Ukanafun in the west
- Mkpat Enin/Etinan in the east
- Rivers State in the southern part of the town

== Churches ==
Asanga popular religious groups	Centres
Christ Faith Church	Dist.17 Hqters, Asanga
Nazareth Baptist Church	Southeast Dist. Hqters.
Solid Rock Kingdom Church	Pillar Of Fire Tabernacle
Qua Iboe Church	Asanga Dist. Supt'cy
United Pentecostal	Asanga Area Hqters
Elect Family Ministry	Asanga Bethel Hqters
The Apostolic Church Nigeria	Nung Ik.Asanga
Methodist Church	Nung Ik.Asanga
Christ Evangelical Church	Nung Ik. Asanga
