= Ekparakwa =

- Town
- Location of Ekparakwa in Nigeria
- Coordinates: 4°47′48″N 7°43′50″E
- Country: Nigeria
- State: Akwa Ibom State
- Elevation: 252 m (827 ft)
- Time zone: UTC+1 (WAT)

Ekparakwa is a town and the name of one of the nine clans found in the Oruk Anam local government area of Akwa Ibom State. This is in the southeastern region of Nigeria.

== History ==
Ekparakwa is the most populated place in the largely rural region of Oruk Anam, meaning Annang land). It is occupied by one of the minority tribes in the state.

The area is naturally rich in resources. The economy is based on oil production, with business companies, hospitals, bank branches, educational centres and major other ventures operating in the area.

The area serves as a major transit station for commuters. And also has a central coronial road leading through Ikot Ntuen and Ika-Annang to Asanga and Ikot Okoro, and the other roads running through Ibagwa to Abak. Others provide access to Ikot Abasi, Etinan and Ukanafun local government areas of Akwa State, Nigeria.
