= Oruk Anam =

- LGA
- Interactive map of Oruk Anam
- Location in Nigeria
- Coordinates: 4°49′0″N 7°39′0″E
- Country: Nigeria
- State: Akwa Ibom State
- Capital: Ikot Ibritam

Government
  - Chairman: Rt Hon Elder Sunday Festus Akpan

Area
  - Total: 543.9 km^{2} (210.0 sq mi)

Population (2022)
  - Total: 219,300
  - Density: 403.2/km^{2} (1,044/sq mi)
- Time zone: UTC+1 (WAT)

Oruk Anam is a Local Government Area located in Akwa Ibom State of Nigeria. The indigenous population is largely made up of Annang people, one of the minority tribes in Southeast Nigeria.

It may be ranked as the largest LGA in Akwa-Ibom due to its land popularity. Its headquarters are located in the town of Ikot Ibritam. It is one of the eight Annang-speaking LGAs.

It consists of two major political units, namely, the Oruk zone The and the Anam zone. Oruk zone used to be a Local Government Area with headquarters at Urua anwa. Oruk zone was known as Southern Annang County Council of the former Abak Division.

Anam zone used to be Anam Local Government Area with headquarters at Ikot Akpan Essien. Anam was called the Anam or Annang County Council in the former Opobo Division.

In 1989, the two Local Government Areas were merged into one.

It shares boundaries with Ikot-Abasi/Mkpat-Enin (Ibibio speakers) to the south/east and Ukanafun (Anaang speakers) to the west. According to the 2006 census, its population was 172,000.

Its inhabitants are mostly farmers, craftsmen and civil servants. The area is a major gateway to Port Harcourt and Aba. There is much commercial activity along the major road points such as the town of Ekparakwa. Government institutions are located here, such as the general hospital in Ikot Okoro, police stations, and schools. The Akwa Ibom State University (AKSU) has a campus in Obio Akpa.

== Major towns ==
The major towns in Oruk Anam are:

- Ekparakwa
- Ikot Ibritam
- Ikot Okoro
- Obio Akpa
- Ikot Inuen
- Ikot Akpan Essien
- Nung Ikot Asanga
- Ntak Ibesit
- Ikot Afanga
- Inen Ekefe
- Ikot Esenam

=== Administrative Areas ===
The nine clans in Oruk Anam:

- Inen Clan
- Obio Akpa Clan
- Ibesit Nung Ikot Clan
- Nung Ikot Clan
- Nung Ita Clan
- Ndot Clan
- Ibesit Clan
- Ekparakwa Clan
- Abak/Midim Clan

== Political Wards ==
Wards	Ward Centers
Ekparakwa	Primary School, Ekparakwa
Ikot Ibritam 1	Primary School, Ikot Ibritam
Ikot Ibritam 2	Community Secondary School, Nung Ita
Ndot/Ikot Okoro 1	Primary School, Inen Abasi Attai
Ndot/Ikot Okoro 2	Secondary School, Mbiakot
Ndot/Ikot Okoro 3	Primary School, Obio Ndot II
Ndot/Ikot Okoro 4	Primary School, Ntak Obio Akpa
Ndot/Ikot Okoro 5	Village Hall, Obio Akpa
Ibesit	Primary School, Ikot Afang
Ibesit/Nung Ikot 1	Secondary School, Ibesit
Ibesit/Nung Ikot 2	Primary School, Nung Ikot Udo Offiong
Abak Midim 1	Primary School, Ikot Ukpong Eren
Abak Midim 2	Primary School, Ikot Akpan Essien
Abak Midim 3	Primary School, Ikot Esenam
Abak Midim 4	Primary School, Ikot Inuen
Abak Midim 5	Primary School, Ikot Osute

== See also ==
- Ekpo Annang
