= Urua anwa =

Urua Anwa is a centrally trading place located in the Oruk Anam local gov't area, the south-eastern region of Akwa Ibom State, Nigeria.

The Nigerian Civil War saw its greatest battles fought in and around the town due to its proximity to two other important Cities: Aba, which is about 50 km (31 mi) distance, and Opobo, about 60 km away. It was the then black scorpion Col Adekunle of the Nigerian Army that fought and conquered the town from the Biafran troops. Urua Anwa till date is a very busy commercial centre in Akwa Ibom State.

== More ==
Urua Anwa today, has been considered by its head of state Gov'r Udom Emmanuel to empowered the area and support the growth of the Market to a highranking among other official trading centres within the country of Nigeria.

== Nearby Towns ==
Neighbouring places around Urua Anwa Market are;

Aya Obio Akpa, Ntenge Akana, Nung Ikot Obiodo, Ikot Afanga, Ikot Ntuk, Asanga, Mbre Ebre, and Ikot Okoro including Ukanafun
