= Ikot Akpan Essien =

Village in Akwa Ibom State, Nigeria

- Town
- Country: Nigeria
- State: Akwa Ibom State
- LGA: Oruk Anam

Ikot Akpan Essien is a village located in the Oruk Anam Local Government Area, Akwa Ibom State, Nigeria. It is as well one among the major towns of the Abak/Midim Clan both in the southern region of Nigeria.

== History ==
Ikot Akpan Essien village was formally the headquarters during the then Anam local government or Anam Council after it formal locations which was shifted from Ikot Okoro and latter to Urua anwa both today in Oruk Anam LGA.
