= Abak/Etim Ekpo/Ika federal constituency =

Federal constituency in Akwa Ibom State, Nigeria

Abak/Etim Ekpo/Ika
- constituency for the House of Representatives
- District: Akwa Ibom North West
- State: Akwa Ibom, Nigeria

Current constituency
- Party: All Progressives Congress
- Member: Clement Jimbo

Abak/Etim Ekpo/Ika is a federal constituency in Akwa Ibom State, Nigeria. It covers Abak, Etim Ekpo and Ika local government areas in the state. Abak/Etim Ekpo/Ika is represented by Clement Jimbo of the All Progressives Congress of Nigeria.
