= Anaang =

Anaang may refer to:

- Anaang people, a people of southern Nigeria
  - Anaang language, a Niger-Congo language
