= Holy Family College, Abak =

Boys' secondary school in Nigeria

Coordinates: 4°58′24″N 7°47′47″E

Holy Family College Oku-Abak
- Motto: Eveteribus Veritas (Truth Forever)
- Type: Catholic Mission School (Private)
- Established: 1942
- Principal: Rev. Fr.(Dr)Columbus Archibong
- Location: Abak, Akwa Ibom, Nigeria
- Colors: White (Uniform) Sky & Navy Blue (Day Wear)
- Nickname: HOFACO
- Website: Official website
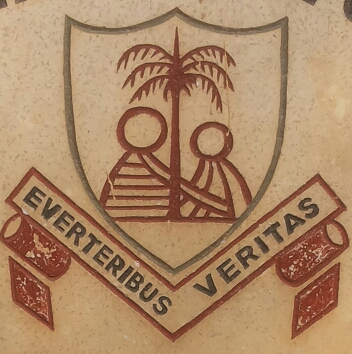

Holy Family College (HOFACO) is a boys' secondary school, located in Abak, Akwa Ibom State, Nigeria. The school was founded in 1942 by the Catholic Mission in Nigeria.

The Holy Family College, Oku-Abak, Abak L.G.A of Akwa Ibom State, was established in 1942 by Bishop James Moynagh SPS, then Catholic Bishop of Calabar Diocese, as the pioneer secondary school on Annang soil. At present, Holy Family College is fully owned, managed, and administered by the Catholic Diocese of Ikot Ekpene, with the Most Rev. Bishop (Dr.) C.R. Umoh as proprietor. Holy Family College runs both junior and senior secondary segments. Though it is a boarding school, a few students are allowed by the administration to attend as day students and remain in their homes. Originally founded and operated as a grammar school, Holy Family College now teaches subjects in core science, commercial and technological disciplines as prescribed and recommended in the Nigerian Secondary School Curriculum of Studies.

== Location ==
The Holy Family College is located in Ikot Abasi road opposite Government Technical College Oku Abak in Abak Town. It is easily accessible either from the Ikot Abai/Ukanafun Ekparakwa axis, Ikot Ekpene axis, or Uyo/Etinan axis as it is situated along the Abak-Ekparakwa Highway.

== Facilities ==
The college has boarding, social, spiritual, and academic facilities.

== Admission Policy ==
Admission into Holy Family College, Oku-Abak, is open to only boys who have completed their elementary education. Such prospective candidates must take and pass the Diocesan Education Commission-organized Common Entrance Examination, which is usually conducted on dates fixed by the college during the second term of the school year, with a late entrance during the early weeks of the third term. Successful candidates would then go through a screening interview, which comprises oral and written tests. Successful candidates who would have met this and other requirements are offered admission.

== Examinations ==
Students' performance and progress are determined through periodic tests, which include continuous assessment tests and terminal examinations. Each student must take an end-of-term examination, part of which was already covered in the pre-examination tests listed above. Promotion to a new class depends on good performance in these examinations.

The Junior School Certificate Examination is organized by the Akwa Ibom State Ministry of Education and WAEC NECO JAMB.

In order to prepare our students for external examinations, JSS3, SS2 & 3 classes, it is the policy of the college to organize mock examinations for the above classes in addition to external competitions within and outside Akwa Ibom State.

== Houses ==
- Moynagh House named after Bishop James Moynagh
- St. Thomas
- Ekanem House
- St. Monica
- Our Lady
- Conolly House
- League House
- Independence House

== Notable alumni ==
1. Dominic Ekandem
2. Emmanuel Ukaegbu
3. Walter Ofonagoro
4. E. U. Essien-Udom
5. Donald Etiebet
6. Martin Elechi
7. Richard Uchechukwu Uche
