= Ikot Udo Abia =

- Village
- Interactive map of Ikot Udo Abia
- Country: Nigeria
- State: Akwa Ibom
- Local Government Area: Etinan
- Ward: Four
- Time zone: UTC+1 (West Africa Time)

Ikot Udo Abia is a village in ward four of the Etinan local government area, Akwa Ibom State, Nigeria. "Ikot Udo Abia" means followers of Udo Abia. The villagers are the Ibibio people who are of the Afaha group within the Iman Clan (their spiritual guide is Itina). The language spoken in the village is Ibibio. Ikot Udo Abia lies in the area of Africa which was affected by the Atlantic slave trade of the sixteenth to nineteenth centuries.

== Geography ==
=== Climate ===
Because of the effects of the maritime and the continental tropical air masses, the climate of Ikot Udo Abia is characterized by two seasons, namely, the wet or rainy season and the dry season. The wet or rainy season lasts for about eight months. The rainy season begins in March or April and lasts until mid-November. The total annual rainfall is approximately 4,000 millimetres (157 in).

The dry season begins in mid-November and ends in March. During this brief period, the continental tropical air mass, northeasterly winds and an associated dry and dusty harmattan haze affects the village. However, as a result of proximity to the ocean, the harmattan dust haze, is relatively mild; it may only last for a few weeks between December and January. The farmers benefit from the harmattan characteristics as they are good for harvesting and storage of the food crop.

Ikot Udo Abia records warm to hot temperatures throughout the year. The mean annual temperatures vary between 26 and 36 °C (79 and 97 °F). The humidity varies between seventy-five percent in July and ninety-five percent in January.

== Infrastructure ==
The community has two primary schools: St. Martins UNA primary school and Sixtowns school. Sixtowns was founded to be a service centre for six nearby villages: Ikot Udobia, Ikot Akpabio, Anan-Ikono, Nung Asang-Ikono, Ikot Ebo-Ikono and Ikot Isong, hence its name “ Six Towns.” (It is located in Ikot Udobia but it is associated with the Qua Iboe church which sits on the boundary between Ikot Udobia and Ikot Akpabio). The St Martins school was built by the First African Church (UNA) and is located in the center of the village. There is also a health centre, a market, a sub post office, a youth center, and a mini-water project that was constructed by the government of Obong Akpan Isemin. The village has an electricity supply.

== Culture ==
The culture and arts of the people are influenced by their religious beliefs and their farming and fishing lives. In the late 1800s, the people of the area were receptive to European missionaries. Most people are Christian and festivals tend to occur at Christmas.

=== Food ===
In Ikot Udo Abia gari, fufu, plantain and yam are staple foods. A wide variety of soups are prepared to eat with the staples. They are made with seafoods, such as crayfish, shellfish (periwinkles for example) or dried fish, palm oil, palm fruits, meat from cow skin, chicken or goat, local spices and leaves such as afang (Gnetum africanum), pumpkin (Telfairia occidentalis), water leaf (Talinum fruticosum), editan, Ntrong, etighi (okra) and atama. Examples are Afang soup, edikaikong soup, atama soup, afia efere ebot (white soup, made without palm oil), efere ndek iyak (fresh fish soup), efere nyama,” ubo, “ bitter leaf soup, melon soup, ikpafai ntuen, and mkpafere.

== Economy ==
The villagers are engaged in crop farming (mostly cassava), raising livestock, fishing, hunting and gathering. Secondary industries include food processing and manufacturing, forestry, and blacksmithing. Tertiary industries include provision of services and governance. The village has a fabricator of cassava processing plant replacement parts.

=== Farming ===
The farming year is divided into three seasons: the early, late and dry seasons. Cassava is the main crop, and its root processed into fufu, tapioca, flour, starch and porridge. The Nka Iwa association is the cassava growers and processors' association in the village. Irrigation is via streams and boreholes.

Vegetables crops are also farmed, for example, fluted pumpkin, bitter leaf, waterleaf, okro, pepper and afang (Gnetum africanum), atama, editan (an orange cultivar), ntron, uyayak, mmeme, and utazi.

== See also ==
- Geography of Nigeria
