= Clement Jimbo =

Nigerian politician (born 1983)

Inemesit Clement Jimbo

Member of the House of Representatives from Akwa Ibom State
- In office 2023–Incumbent
- Constituency: Abak/Etim Ekpo/Ika Federal Constituency

Personal details
- Born: 12 March 1983 (age 43)
- Party: All Progressives Congress
- Occupation: Politician

Inemesit Clement Jimbo (born 12 March 1983) is a Nigerian politician. Hon. Jimbo also Known as 'Youth slot' hails from Abak Local Government Area, Akwa Ibom State. He is currently serving as the member representing Abak/Etim Ekpo/Ika Federal Constituency of Akwa Ibom State in the House of Representatives.
