= Asanga (disambiguation) =

Asanga was a 4th-century Buddhist philosopher.

Asanga may also refer to:

- Asanga, Nigeria
- Asanga Abeyagoonasekera, Sri Lankan writer
- Asanga Jayasooriya, Sri Lankan cricketer

== See also ==
- Asangaon (disambiguation)
