= Akapasak Efa =

- Village
- Interactive map of Akapasak Efa
- Coordinates: 5°2′34.238″N 7°55′9.743″E
- Country: Nigeria
- State: Akwa Ibom
- Local Government Area: Etinan

Akapasak Efa is a village in Etinan local government area of Akwa Ibom State in Nigeria.
