= Ikot Itina =

Ikot Itina is a village in Etinan local government area of Akwa Ibom State.
