= Ikot Etor =

- Village
- Interactive map of Ikot Etor
- Country: Nigeria
- State: Akwa Ibom
- Local Government Area: Etinan

Ikot Etor is a village in Etinan local government area of Akwa Ibom State.
