= Afaha Akpan Ekpo =

Village in Akwa Ibom State in Nigeria

- Village
- Interactive map of Afaha Akpan Ekpo
- Coordinates: 4°49′46.31″N 7°50′1.18″E
- Country: Nigeria
- State: Akwa Ibom
- Local Government Area: Etinan

Afaha Akpan Ekpo is a village in Etinan local government area of Akwa Ibom State in Nigeria.
