= Ikot Akpan Obio Eket =

- Village
- Interactive map of Ikot Akpan Obio Eket
- Country: Nigeria
- State: Akwa Ibom
- Local Government Area: Etinan

Ikot Akpan Obio Eket is a village in Etinan local government area of Akwa Ibom State.
