= Ikot Ikpuho =

- Village
- Interactive map of Ikot Ikpuho
- Country: Nigeria
- State: Akwa Ibom
- Local Government Area: Etinan

Ikot Ikpuho is a village in the Etinan local government area of Akwa Ibom State.
