= Nse Essien (academic) =

Nigerian sedimentologist and former Vice Chancellor of Akwa Ibom State University

- Essien (2021)
- Born: Nse Udo Essien
- Education: University of Calabar
- Occupations: Geologist; sedimentologist; academic; university administrator; public official
- Employers: University of Calabar; Akwa Ibom State University
- Known for: Third Vice Chancellor of Akwa Ibom State University
- Title: Vice Chancellor of Akwa Ibom State University (2020–2025); Commissioner for Education, Akwa Ibom State

Nse Udo Essien is a Nigerian professor of geology and sedimentology, university administrator and former public official. He was the Vice Chancellor of Akwa Ibom State University (AKSU) from August 2020, after serving as a commissioner in the Akwa Ibom State government. Before that he was a member of the Department of Geology at the University of Calabar, where he became Head of Department.

== Education and early career ==
Essien graduated from the University of Calabar in 1984 and went on to practise geology and sedimentology, with a specialty in carbonate and clastic sedimentology. He holds a master's degree in petroleum geology and sedimentology and a PhD in carbonate sedimentology.

He taught at the University of Calabar, where he was Head of the Department of Geology. He co-authored a paper with Aniekan Edet presented at the 7th International Congress of the International Association of Engineering Geology in Lisbon.

== Public service ==
Essien served in the Akwa Ibom State Executive Council under Governor Udom Emmanuel. He was Commissioner for Science and Technology and later Commissioner for Education. When he left the education ministry, Enobong Mbobo, a university lecturer and economist, was named the new Commissioner for Education.

== Vice Chancellor of Akwa Ibom State University ==
On 1 August 2020 the Akwa Ibom State Government announced that Governor Udom Emmanuel had approved Essien's appointment as Vice Chancellor of Akwa Ibom State University, with effect from Monday, 3 August 2020, for a fixed term of five years. He succeeded the acting Vice Chancellor, Eno James Ibanga, who had been appointed to the state executive council.

His term was due to end in August 2025. On 6 August 2025 the university's Governing Council appointed Otoabasi Akpan, then Deputy Vice Chancellor, as acting Vice Chancellor.

== See also ==
- Akwa Ibom State University
- Eno James Ibanga
- Otoabasi Akpan
