= Ikot Ibok =

- Village
- Interactive map of Ikot Ibok
- Country: Nigeria
- State: Akwa Ibom
- Local Government Area: Etinan

Ikot Ibok is a Nigerian village in the Etinan local government area of Akwa Ibom State.
