= Ikot Esen Oku =

- Village
- Interactive map of Ikot Esen Oku
- Country: Nigeria
- State: Akwa Ibom
- Local Government Area: Etinan

Ikot Esen Oku is a village in Etinan local government area of Akwa Ibom State.
