= Ikot Ekang =

- Village
- Interactive map of Ikot Ekang
- Country: Nigeria
- State: Akwa Ibom
- Local Government Area: Etinan

Ikot Ekang is a village in Etinan local government area of Akwa Ibom State.
