= Urua Inyang =

Town in Nigeria

Coordinates: 5.023090°N 7.538950°E

Urua Inyang is a town located in Ika, local government area Akwa Ibom State, Nigeria It shares boundaries with two villages: Ikot Eseden and Ikot Usun.

The former Super Eagle keeper Vincent Enyeama hails from Urua Inyang.
