= Ikot Udo Adia =

- Village
- Interactive map of Ikot Udo Adia
- Country: Nigeria
- State: Akwa Ibom
- Local Government Area: Etinan

Ikot Udo Adia is a village in Etinan local government area of Akwa Ibom State.
