= Ikot Esenam =

- Town
- Location in Nigeria
- Coordinates: 4.682°N 7.628°E
- Country: Nigeria
- State: Akwa Ibom State
- LGA: Oruk Anam

Ikot Esenam is a town located in Oruk Anam Local Government Area. It is among the major towns of the Abak/Midim Clan both in the region of Akwa Ibom State and the southern region of Nigeria. It is located within the West Africa Time Zone (GMT+1).
