= Ekom, Etinan =

Ekom
- Village
- Interactive map of Ekom
- Country: Nigeria
- State: Akwa Ibom
- Local Government Area: Etinan

Ekom is a village in Etinan local government area of Akwa Ibom State.
