= Ndon Utim =

- Village
- Interactive map of Ndon Utim
- Country: Nigeria
- State: Akwa Ibom
- Local Government Area: Etinan

Ndon Utim is a village in the Etinan local government area of Akwa Ibom State, Nigeria.
