= Nung Ikot Clan =

Nung Ikot
- Clans
- Interactive map of Nung Ikot
- Country: Nigeria
- State: Akwa Ibom State
- LGA: Oruk Anam

Nung Ikot is one of the nine clans located in the Oruk Anam local government area. It is the fourth administrative area. Its inhabitants speak the Annang language.

== Subdivisions ==
- Eka Nung Ikot
- Nung Ikot Asanga
- Nung Ikot Obiodo
- Nung Ikot Oku Usung
- Nung Ikot Urua Ekpo

== History ==
Nung Ikot is located in Oruk Anam, a region of Akwa Ibom State. The administrative area produces crude oil, palm oil, and the economy is mainly based on agriculture.
