= Ikot Akpa Esa =

- Village
- Interactive map of Ikot Akpa Esa
- Country: Nigeria
- State: Akwa Ibom
- Local Government Area: Etinan
- District: Southern Iman
- Postal code: 522103

Ikot Akpa Esa is a village in Etinan, a local government area of the Akwa Ibom state.
