= Ikot Nseyen =

- Village
- Interactive map of Ikot Nseyen
- Country: Nigeria
- State: Akwa Ibom
- Local Government Area: Etinan

Ikot Nseyen is a village in Etinan local government area of Akwa Ibom State.
