= Afaha Urua Essien =

- Village
- Interactive map of Afaha Urua Essien
- Coordinates: 4°49′46.31″N 7°50′1.18″E
- Country: Nigeria
- State: Akwa Ibom
- Local Government Area: Etinan

Afaha Urua Essien is a village in Etinan the local governmental area of Akwa Ibom State in Nigeria.
