= Awa Ntong =

- Village
- Interactive map of Awa Ntong
- Country: Nigeria
- State: Akwa Ibom
- Local Government Area: Etinan

Awa Ntong is a village in Etinan local government area of Akwa Ibom State in Nigeria.
