= Ikot Akpanya =

Ikot Akpanya Asuna - Iman
- Village
- Interactive map of Ikot Akpanya
- Country: Nigeria
- State: Akwa Ibom
- Local Government Area: Etinan

Ikot Akpanya is a village in Etinan local government area of Akwa Ibom State.
