= Obio Akpa =

- Town
- Interactive map of Obio Akpa
- Country: Nigeria
- State: Akwa Ibom State
- LGA: Oruk Anam

Obio Akpa is a town located in the northeast part of the Oruk Anam Local Government Area. It is as well one among the nine administrative areas/districts known as Obio Akpa Clan both in the region of Akwa Ibom State, south south Nigeria

== History ==
Obio Akpa is a populated area in the Oruk Anam and it is also the gateway between Abak LGA and the Oruk Anam LGA The area is naturally rich in its crude oil and palm oil production, as in land population and academics the area, the Akwa Ibom State University (Aksuni) Campus(2) is situated within the area. Including public primary and secondary schools.

== Subdivision ==
Villages in Obio Akpa
- Akpa
- Ata Essien Obio
- Ata Obio Akpa
- Aya Obio Akpa
- Ikot Eka Ide
- Ikot Idiaha
- Ikot Okoro
- Ikot Ukpong Obiokpong
- Ntak Obio Akpa
- Ntenge Akana
- Okpokoro
- Warife
