= Anyam Efa =

- Village
- Interactive map of Anyam Efa
- Country: Nigeria
- State: Akwa Ibom
- Local Government Area: Etinan

Anyam Efa is a village in Etinan local government area of Akwa Ibom State.
