= Ikot Mfon =

- Village
- Interactive map of Ikot Mfon
- Coordinates: 4.7670°N 7.8703°E
- Country: Nigeria
- State: Akwa Ibom
- Local Government Area: Etinan

Ikot Mfon is a village in Etinan local government area of Akwa Ibom State.
