= Edem Ekpat =

Village in Akwa Ibom State, Nigeria

- Village
- Interactive map of Edem Ekpat
- Country: Nigeria
- State: Akwa Ibom State
- Local Government Area: Etinan

Edem Ekpat is a village in Etinan local government area of Akwa Ibom State in Nigeria.
