= Ediene =

Ediene Abak
- Town, Clan
- Country: Nigeria
- State: Akwa Ibom State

Ediene is a town as well as one of the five clans located in the Abak. Its inhabitants speak the Annang language.

== Subdivisions ==
- Eta Ediene
- Ibanang Ediene
- Ikot Akwa Ebom
- Ikot Inyang Ediene
- Ikot Obong
- Ikot Oku Ubara and *Awoghonyah village

== History ==
Ediene is a major place and a region of Akwa Ibom State, the area is naturally rich in her resources. UNIUYO's (Ime Umana Campus) is situated in the area.
