= Asangaon =

Asangaon may refer to:

- Asangaon railway station, in Thane district of Maharashtra, India
- Asangaon, Dahanu, a village in Palghar district of Maharashtra, India
- Asangaon Budruk, a village in Palghar district of Maharashtra, India
