= Holy Family College =

Schools with the name Holy Family College:

- Holy Family College (Wisconsin), United States
- Holy Family University, United States (historically known as Holy Family College)
- Holy Family College, Abak, Nigeria
- Holy Family College, Sydenham, South Africa

== See also ==
- Holy Family (disambiguation)
