= Ikot Ibritam =

- Town
- Interactive map of Ikot Ibritam
- Coordinates: 4°48′28″N 7°36′55″E
- Country: Nigeria
- State: Akwa Ibom State
- LGA: Oruk Anam

Ikot Ibritam is a rural settlement as well as the local government headquarters of the Oruk Anam local government area. It is under the Inen Clan as the one among the nine administrative areas in the Oruk Anam

== History ==
Ikot Ibritam is popularly known among the local government council headquarters and as well as one of the administrative centers in Akwa Ibom State, Nigeria and a seat of a first-order administrative division in the Oruk Anam LGA. neared Ukanafun and a part in Rivers State.

== Localities in the area ==
- Ikot Ekpuk
- Ikot Udor Esiom
- Ikot Ntuk
- Ikot Aka 5 km northwest
- Ikot Esien 5 km north
- Ibesit Nung Ikot 5 km south.
