= Ikot Nte =

- Village
- Interactive map of Ikot Nte
- Country: Nigeria
- State: Akwa Ibom
- Local Government Area: Etinan

Ikot Nte is a village in Etinan local government area of Akwa Ibom State, Nigeria.
