= Emmanuel Ekon =

Emmanuel Bartholomew Ekon

Member of the House of Representatives
- In office 7 May 2011 – 2019
- Constituency: Abak/Etim Ekpo/Ika Federal Constituency

Personal details
- Born: 7 October 1971 (age 54) Iwukem, Etim Ekpo, Akwa Ibom State, Nigeria
- Party: New Nigeria Peoples Party
- Other political affiliations: Peoples Democratic Party (PDP)
- Occupation: Politician, Entrepreneur

Emmanuel Bartholomew Ekon (born 7 October 1971) is a Nigerian politician who served as a member of the House of Representatives, representing the Abak/Etim Ekpo/Ika Federal Constituency from 2011 to 2019 under the Peoples Democratic Party (PDP). He later contested the Ikot Ekpene Senatorial District seat in the 2023 Nigerian Senate election under the New Nigeria Peoples Party (NNPP) but was unsuccessful.

== Early life and education ==
Ekon was born in Iwukem, Etim Ekpo Local Government Area of Akwa Ibom State. He attended St. Joseph's Catholic Primary School, Iwukem, and Regina Coeli Secondary School. He earned a Bachelor of Science degree in statistics from the University of Uyo.

== Professional career ==
Before entering politics, Ekon worked as an entrepreneur and served as president and CEO of Outreach Medical Services (USA) and CEO of E&E Consultancy Nigeria Limited.

== Political career ==
Ekon was first elected to the House of Representatives in 2011 on the platform of the PDP. He was re-elected in 2015 and served two consecutive terms until 2019.

During his tenure, he spoke on issues relating to security and governance in his constituency.

In the 2023 Nigerian Senate election, he contested the Ikot Ekpene Senatorial District seat under the New Nigeria Peoples Party but lost to Godswill Akpabio of the All Progressives Congress.

== Electoral history ==
Year	Position	Party	Result
2011	Member, House of Representatives	PDP	Won
2015	Member, House of Representatives	PDP	Won
2023	Senator, Ikot Ekpene	NNPP	Lost
