= Ika, Nigeria =

Ika
- LGA
- Nickname: (Ika-Annang)
- Interactive map of Ika
- Location in Nigeria
- Coordinates: 5°01′0″N 7°32′0″E
- Country: Nigeria
- State: Akwa Ibom State
- Established: 1966

Government
  - Chairman: Hon. Barr Utibe Nwoko

Area
  - Total: 116.3 km^{2} (44.9 sq mi)

Population (2022)
  - Total: 92,900
  - Density: 799/km^{2} (2,070/sq mi)
- Time zone: UTC+1 (WAT)
- Website: www.annangheritage.org

Ika (Ika-Annang; also Ika Ibom) is a Local Government Area in Akwa Ibom State, Nigeria. The headquarters of the Ika local government area is Urua Inyang. Ika is subdivided into clans, Ito, Achan and Ikananang (Odoro) and over 50 villages in totality with an identical cultural display called Akakum/Asakom nicknamed Afum (meaning wind). Displayed mostly at Christmas.

Ika is one of the eight Annang local government areas of the present thirty-one local government areas in Akwa Ibom State. Ika local government area of Annang people Annang or Ika people (Ika-Annang) were formerly in the old Abak which was subdivided into other local governments resulting in five new local government areas, namely Abak, Oruk-Anam, Etim-Ekpo, Ukanafun and Ika local government areas. During the colonization of Nigeria by the British, Ika Annang was for the most part under the Aba division of the Owerri province, as opposed to other Annang who were under the Ikot Ekpene or Abak divisions.

The language of the Ika people of Akwa Ibom State is an Annang dialect of the Annang people.

== Villages and towns ==
The political and spiritual headquarters of the Ika Annang people is Urua Inyang (Nsidung). Other notable villages in Ika include Ikot Osukpong, Abiakana, Nto Ukara, Ikot Ikara, Nto Udo Enwan, Ikot Onono, Ikot Akpan Anwa, Ikot Urom and Afen Ikot Okoro. During pre-colonial times, the Ika Annang people, just like other Annangs had established military and marital alliances with the people of Arochukwu. This is still evident today in Ika villages such as Ikot Osukpong. Moreover, work by Professor Ephraim Stephen Essien has shown that Ika and Arochukwu people share a number of deities.

A few villages in Ika Local Government Area have historical and cultural affiliations with the Igbo people. Villages like Ikot Inyang (Formerly known as Oboeze- meaning Umubueze (People of Kings) in Igbo language) have strong affiliations with the Igbo people.

- Urua Inyang

== Political Wards ==
Wards	Ward Centers
Urban 1	Primary Sch., Urua Inyang
Urban 2	Convent Sch., Efen Ibom
Achan 1	Court Hall, Ikot Osukpong
Achan 2	Primary Sch., Ikot Akpan Offiong
Achan 3	Primary Sch., Ikot Akpan Okure
Achan 4	Village Hall, Abiakana
Itto 1	Court Hall, Ito
Itto 2	Primary School, Ikot Akpan Anwa
Itto 3	Primary School, Nto Udo Enwan
Odoro 1	Village Hall Nto Usoh
Odoro 2	Primary School, Ikot Edim
