= Ikot Akata =

- Village
- Interactive map of Ikot Akata
- Country: Nigeria
- State: Akwa Ibom
- Local Government Area: Etinan

Ikot Akata is a village in Etinan local government area of Akwa Ibom State.
