= Akwa Ibom State University =

Public university in Nigeria

Coordinates: 5°02′19″N 7°54′45″E

- Akwa Ibom University
- Type: Public, research
- Location: Akwa Ibom State, Nigeria

Akwa Ibom State University (AKSU) is a public university owned by the Akwa Ibom State government. Unity of people with a passion to constantly seek knowledge that addresses practical issues of development in Nigeria. The university opened its doors to its pioneer students in the 2010/2011 academic year.

== The campus ==
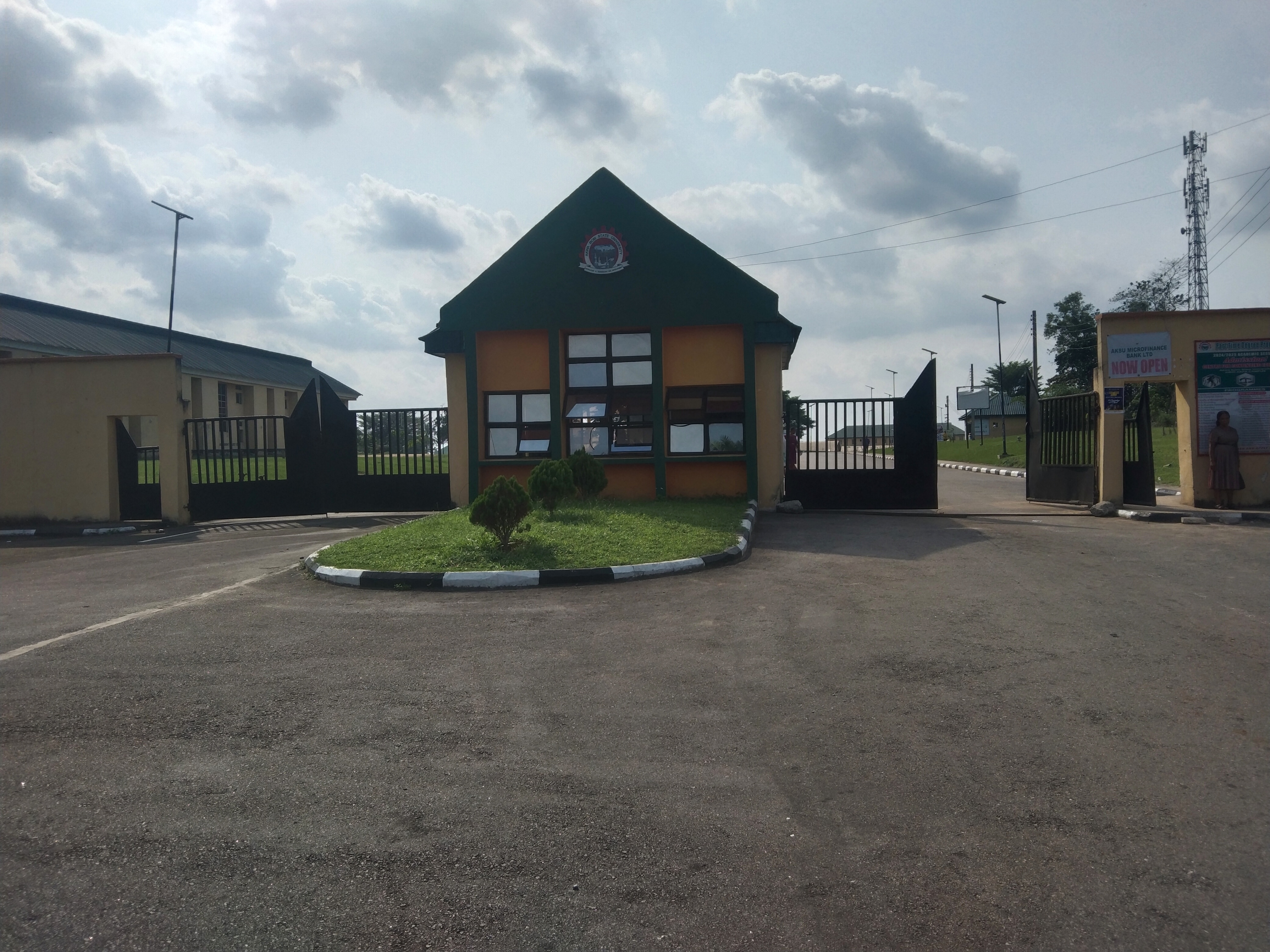
Akwa Ibom State University, Oruk Anam

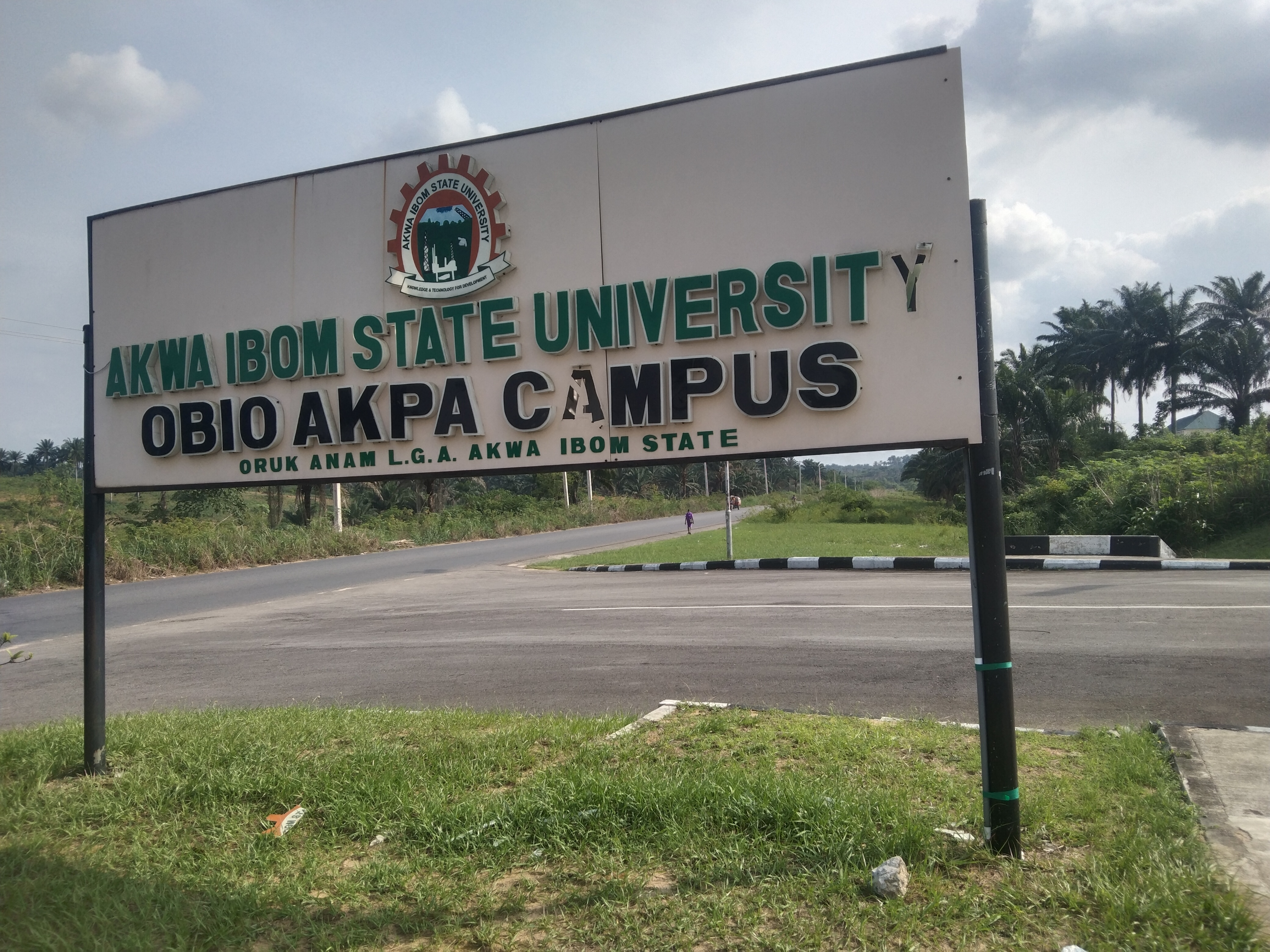
Akwa Ibom State University entrance sign

At conception, the university was to be located within Akwa Ibom State's Technology Triangle at the University Town. However, the administration of the Akwa Ibom State government later changed the enabling law of the university into a multi-campus institution with the main campus at Ikot Akpaden, Mkpat Enin L.G.A and a second campus fondly known as Abak Campus situated at Obio Akpa, Oruk Anam L.G.A. The goals of the university have been modified by the administration of the State Government to transform the university into a conventional university whose focus is not just Technology and Applied Science but also on Arts. In line with this transformation, the name of the institution has been changed from Akwa Ibom State University of Technology to Akwa Ibom State University.. The Obio Akpa campus later became Federal University of Agriculture and Technology, Obio Akpa, Akwa Ibom State.

== History ==
On October 18, 2000, at Uyo, Akwa Ibom State, Nigeria, the Governor of Akwa Ibom State at the time, Arc. Victor Attah inaugurated a committee for the establishment of Akwa Ibom State University of Technology.

The committee members included Professor Ephraim E. Okon, Professor Ekong E. Ekong, Professor Ulo K. Enyenihi, Professor Reuben K. Udo, Professor E. W. Mbipom, Engr. Mrs. Mayen Adetiba, Engr. Esio O. Mboho, Engr. Akpan Ufot Ukpoho, Engr. Uyai Ekaette, Dr. Usen J. Antia, Sir Pius Wilson, Dr. Engineer Linus Asuquo, Mr. Moses Essien, Dr. Ini Udoka, Professor Joe Uyanga, Mr. E. J. Akpan.

The university opened its doors to its pioneer students in the 2010/2011 academic year.

There was a mandate to establish AKUTECH, a project which has been embraced by the former Executive Governor of Akwa Ibom State, Obong (Barr) Godswill Akpabio leading to the enactment of the University Law on September 15, 2009, by the Akwa Ibom State House of Assembly.

== Vice Chancellors ==
- Professor Sunday Petters pioneer vice chancellor till 2015
- Professor Eno James Ibanga 2015 till 2020
- Professor Nse Essien 2020 to 2025
- Otoabasi Akpan 2025 till date

== Staff development ==
More than 60 faculty members are undergoing AKSU-sponsored postgraduate training in universities in Europe, North America, and Singapore. More centers of excellence have been identified in South America, Japan and other Asian countries for further collaboration and manpower development.

== Faculties ==
Below is the list of Faculties and their various departments.

- Faculty of Engineering

Departments: Chemical/Petrochemical Engineering, Mechanical/Aerospace Engineering, Civil Engineering, Marine/Naval Architecture Engineering, Agricultural Engineering. Electrical/Electronic Engineering.

- Faculty of Physical Science

Departments: Physics science, Chemistry science, Mathematics and Statistics, Geology, Computer science.

- Faculty of Biological Sciences

Departments: Biological Science, Zoology, Botany, Microbiology, Marine Biology, Genetics and Biotechnology

- Faculty of Education

Departments: Mathematics Education, Chemistry Education, Biology Education, Integrated Science Education, Physics Education.

- Faculty of Agriculture

Departments: Agricultural Economics and Extension, Soil Science, Crop Science, Animal Science.

- Faculty of Social Sciences

Departments:, Mass Communication, Economics, Political Studies.

- Faculty of Arts

Departments: English and Literary Studies, Religious and Cultural Studies, Performing Art (Theater Art), History and International Studies, Philosophy.

- Faculty of Management Science

Departments: Accounting, Marketing, Business Administration.
