= Ikot Ebiyak =

- Village
- Location within Nigeria
- Coordinates: 5°10′0″N 8°3′0″E
- Country: Nigeria
- State: Akwa Ibom
- Local Government Area: Etinan

Ikot Ebiyak is a village in the Etinan local government area of Akwa Ibom State.
