= Walter Ofonagoro =

Nigerian scholar, politician and businessman

Chief Dr. Walter Ofonagoro KSC, FCJA, FNIPR, M.IoD
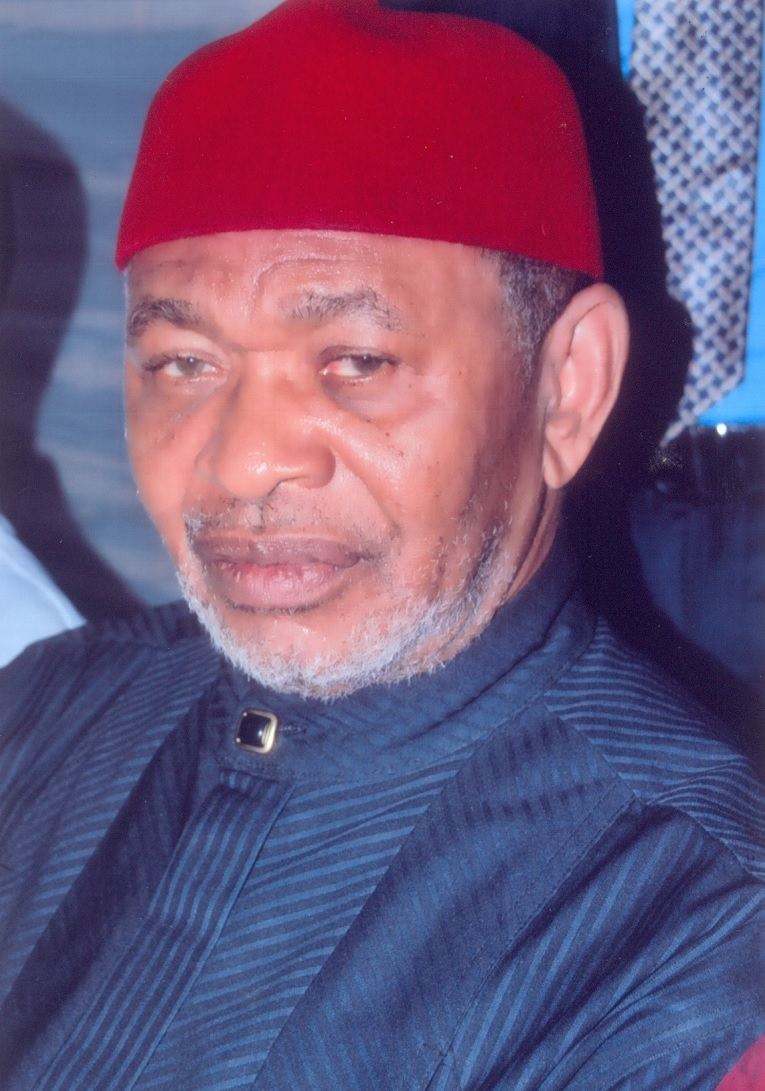
- Born: Walter Ibekwe Ofonagoro; 24 June 1940 (age 86); Port Harcourt, Nigeria
- Education: Economic history
- Alma mater: Trinity College, Toronto, Canada (BA, 1966); Columbia University, New York City (MA, 1967; PhD, 1972)
- Occupations: Businessman; politician; financial consultant
- Spouse: Lolo Stephanie Nirmala Ofonagoro
- Children: 4

Walter Ofonagoro (born 24 June 1940) is a Nigerian scholar, politician and businessman who is a former Minister of Information and Culture, Federal Republic of Nigeria. He is also the Chairman of Stanwal Securities Limited (member of the Nigerian Stock Exchange), as well as Chairman of Merit Microfinance Bank Ltd.

== Early life ==
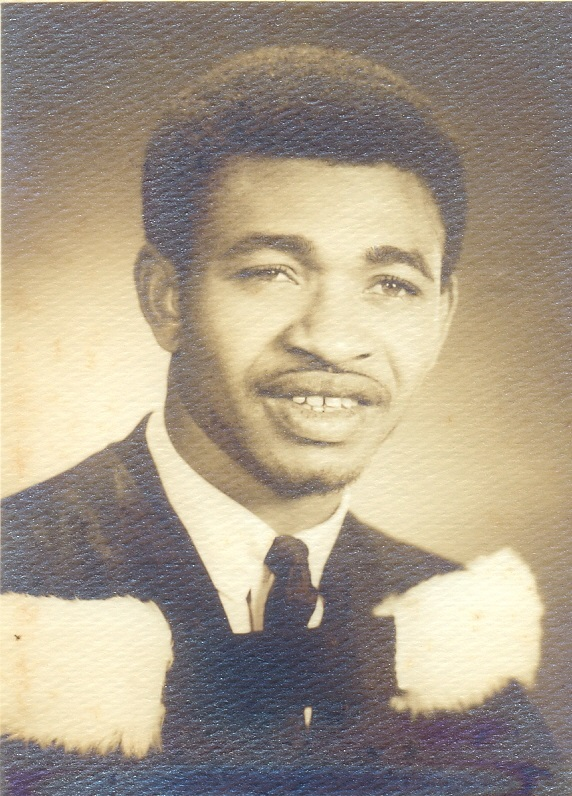
Ofonagoro graduation photo, Trinity College, Toronto, 1966

Born and raised in Port Harcourt Rivers State, Nigeria on 24 June 1940, Ofonagoro is the third child and second son in a family of fifteen. His father, Chief Gabriel Obioha Ofonagoro (Duruishimbu IV of Umuanu Amaigbo and Ugochinyere Igbo 1 of Amaigbo) was at the time of his birth, Assistant Transport Manager of UAC Bulk Oil Plant, Port Harcourt. His mother, Lolo Gladys Ogonnaya Ofonagoro was a dealer in UAC Textiles.

He was educated at Baptist Day School Port Harcourt from 1947 to 1954, and subsequently at Baptist High School Port Harcourt from 1955 to 1959. He then went on to study at Holy Family College Abak in Akwa Ibom State, Nigeria where he studied for his A-levels and passed the Cambridge Higher School Certificate examination with Distinction in 1961. Afterwards he went to study at Trinity College, University of Toronto Canada where he graduated with a BA. First Class Hons. Modern History, in 1966. He also studied at Columbia University, New York, where he earned an MA in African Economic History with Distinction in June 1967, and finally got his PhD in African Economic History with Distinction on February 2, 1972. He was a distinguished lecturer in the Department of History at the University of Lagos, Nigeria

== Career ==
=== Contributions to academics ===
Many years prior to his work in the Ministry of Information and Culture, Ofonagoro first began his career in 1962 as a tutor in Baptist High School Port Harcourt where he taught English, Latin and History. From 1968 to 1975, he held several esteemed positions in Columbia University, New York including; Columbia University Preceptor, Instructor in History and Associate Professor of History. During his tenure at Columbia, he helped to organize the Columbia-Morningside Lecture Series on African Heritage from 1968 to 1976. He was also appointed Adviser to Undergraduate History Majors at Columbia University School of General Studies; and was a member of the University Senate from 1970 to 1972. He also served as a visiting professor at various universities in the New York/New Jersey area such as; Queens College, New York University, Brooklyn College, Long Island University, Rutgers College, and City College. He then returned to Nigeria in 1976 where he taught as a Senior Lecturer in the Department of History, University of Lagos until June 1982. During that time, he served in the Postgraduate Assembly which established the Post Graduate School of the University of Lagos. He was also a visiting Senior Lecturer in Economic History at the University of Ibadan from 1978 to 1979. He pioneered the teaching of African Economic History at the University of Lagos (1977 to 1982) and the University of Ibadan (1977 to 1978). He withdrew his services from the University of Lagos in 1982 to pursue a career in politics and business.

=== Contributions to politics and national service ===
Ofonagoro was a contributor on occasionally featured articles and editorials published in the Eastern Nigerian Guardian newspaper, Port Harcourt, from 1959 to 1960. He was also a frequent contributor to radio, television and newspaper discussions in the Canadian and American media. He also lectured on Africa on the Sunrise Semester program of CBS TV in New York. On his return to Nigeria in 1976, he continued his active role in media such as radio, television and newspapers. He also delivered public lectures at the National Institute for Policy and Strategic Studies, Kuru Plateau State and the Command and Staff College in Jaji, Kaduna State.

In 1979, he was appointed as Consultant Political Analyst to the Nigeria Television Authority by the government of the Federal Republic of Nigeria. His programme Verdict 79 was an epic on the Election of 1979. The programme ended in March 1980.

He has led Federal Government Delegations to foreign countries, including a delegation to the International Symposium on the Renaissance in Sofia, Bulgaria (1981). In the same year, he led a delegation to Shipyard Split, in former Yugoslavia, to take delivery of MV River Maje on behalf of the federal government which was acquired for the Nigerian National Shipping Line. Again in October 1981, he was appointed adviser to the Nigerian delegation and member of the special political committee of the United Nations General Assembly by the federal government of Nigeria.

In 1982, he was appointed Chairman of the News Agency of Nigeria, and shortly after he became Director-General of the NTA in 1983.

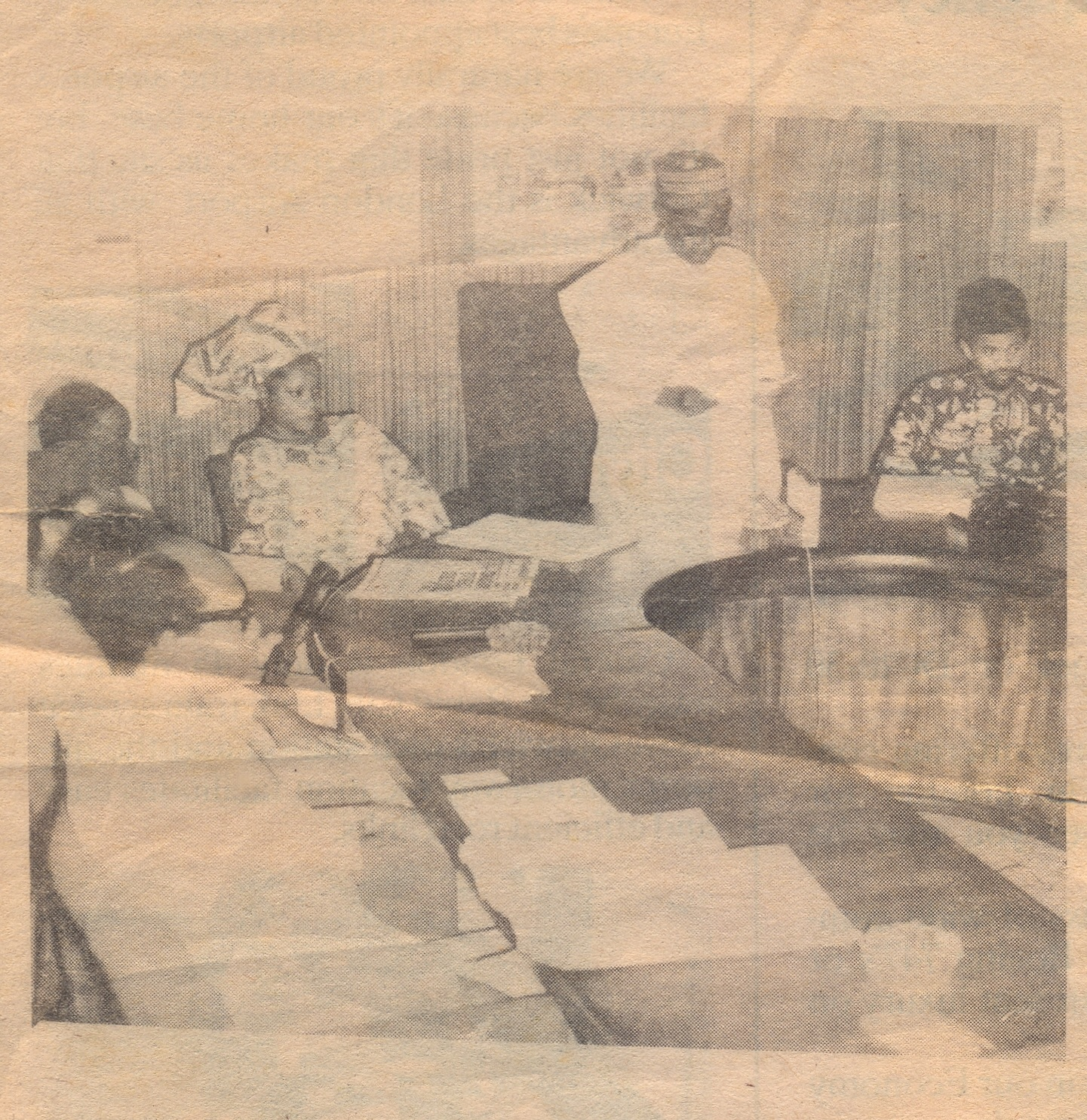
Dr. Ofonagoro with Mallam Garba Wushishi (former Minister of Information) at the inauguration of the NAN Board, 1982

In 1993, he was Director of Communications in the Presidential Campaign of Bashir Tofa (under the banner of the National Republican Convention) during the elections of 1993.

From 1994 to 1995, Ofonagoro was appointed Member of the National Constitutional Conference Commission, where he served as Chairman of the Organization, the Conference Convention and the Publicity Committee of the Constitutional Conference Commission which served as the secretariat of the Constitutional Conference. He was also appointed a member of some other sub-committees at the conference such as The Committee on National Defence, The Committee on Fundamental Human Rights, Press Freedom and Citizenship, and The Constitution Drafting Committee.

In 1995, he was elected Chairman of the Intergovernmental Council for the Development of Communications Among Non-Aligned Countries (IGC).

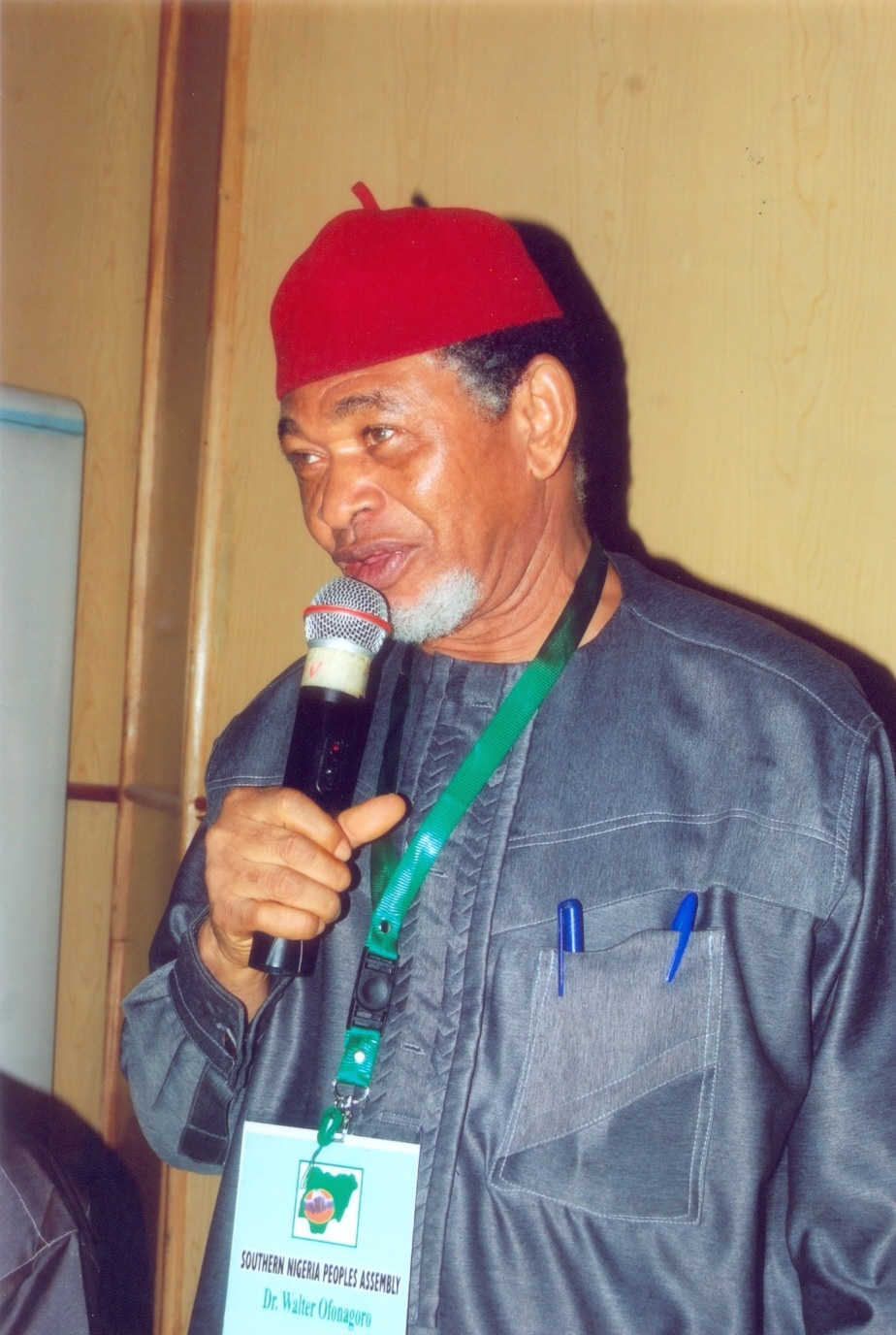
Ofonagoro speaking at a meeting of the Southern Nigeria People's Assembly

On March 20, 1995, Dr. Ofonagoro was appointed Federal Minister of Information and Culture as the Constitutional Conference began to wind down. He thus became a member of the Federal Executive Council and during his administration, helped to restructure the Federal Ministry of Information. While with the Ministry, he embarked on a mission to promote a positive image of the country which had been damaged overseas.

During his time with the Ministry of Information, Ofonagoro led a delegation to Germany and WIPO Geneva (1995). Nigeria won the WIPO Gold Medal for Advancements in Copyright Law and Administration for that year. Among his responsibilities on that mission was to negotiate and sign cultural and bilateral agreements on behalf of Nigeria with friendly foreign countries. He has also led delegations to places such as North Korea, Iran, Ethiopia and Iraq, where he met Saddam Hussein in 1996.

During his tenure as Minister of Information and Culture, Ofonagoro signed cultural agreements with about 20 countries and organizations.

He had ensured full development of the NTA Television College in Jos (1983) and commissioned its engineering and journalism facilities in that year. National Film Institute, National Film Archives, and the National Film Processing Laboratories were also established in Jos (1995) during his administration. These measures were necessary to establish Nollywood as an industry on a firm footing by providing the necessary facilities for training of the operators right here in Nigeria. Also, 1996 saw the granting of licenses, on a large scale, to private sector operators to own and operate radio and TV stations in Nigeria. This created a market for independent film producers to operate profitably and thus, facilitated the development of Nollywood.

He has also held many other positions which are listed below as follows:

- Chairman of the Council of Information Ministers of Non-Aligned Countries (COMINAC). There are 113 member countries in COMINAC.
- Chairman Nigerian Committee, World Decade for Cultural Development.
- Vice Chairman PAN African News Agency
- Chairman National Council of Information and Culture
- Chairman of Council of Information Ministers of ECOWAS Countries
- Member, Vision 2010 Committee, 1995–1997
- Member Imo State Elders Council, 2007 till date
- Member National Party of Nigeria
- Member National Republican Convention
- Member People's Democratic Party
- Member Southern Nigeria People's Assembly
- Member Aka Ikenga Lagos
- Member Ndigbo Lagos
- Member Ime Obi Caucus, Ohanaeze Ndigbo
- Member, Ikoyi Club 1938
- Member, IBB International Golf and Country Club, Abuja
- Registered Trustee, National Association of Movie Journalists
- Patron of NOPA (Nollywood Outstanding Personality Awards)
- Chief Host, Nollywood NOPA Awards

=== Contributions to business and economic management ===
From 1981 to 1983, Ofonagoro has served as Director/Chairman of the Finance and Establishment Committee of the Board of Amalgamated Tin Mines of Nigeria Bukuru, Plateau State, the largest tin mining Company in Nigeria. From 1981 to 1984, he has served as Chairman of Finance and Establishment Committee of the ATMN Board of Directors.

He has also operated as director, chairman and CEO of the following Stanwal Group of Companies which include Stanwal Builders Nigeria Ltd, Stanwal Consultants Nigeria Ltd, and SUNOD Transport and Haulage Company Ltd.

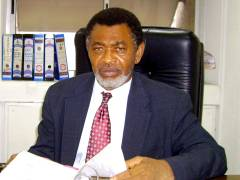
Ofonagoro in his office at Broad Street, Lagos, 2008

From 1989 to 1995, he was Director of Thomas Kingsley Securities Ltd (Member of Nigeria Stock Exchange). Then he established his own stock brokerage firm (Stanwal Securities Ltd.) in 1991 which was initially known as Atlantic Securities Ltd. Atlantic Securities was renamed to Stanwal Securities in order to avoid any confusion of identity with other similarly named brokerage houses in the Nigerian Capital Market. On June 20, 1997, the firm was granted a license by the Securities and Exchange Commission to operate as a fully independent securities brokerage house with an initial paid-up capital of N5,639,000. However, as at 30 June 2015 the company had achieved a paid-up capital of N251,704,028 and had authorized capital of N1bn, but the net shareholders' funds stood at N72,990,619. Under the circumstances, with the current nose-dive of oil prices and with the capital market in a freefall, the board of Stanwal is reviewing strategies for future business activities. On the brighter side, Stanwal Consultants Ltd. won a gold medal for Excellence in Business Practice from the Foundation for Excellence in Business Practice, Geneva, Switzerland.

Ofonagoro is also a principal shareholder, and the present Chairman of Merit Microfinance Bank Ltd. (formerly known as Amaigbo Community Bank Ltd). He has gained considerable experience investing in equities in the New York Stock Exchange since 1970, and the Nigerian Stock Exchange since 1977. In 1983, the Nigerian Stock Exchange hosted Dr. Ofonagoro to a private luncheon at the Metropolitan Club Victoria Island, Lagos, in appreciation of his role in popularizing the Capital Market through television broadcasting.

== Personal life ==
Ofonagoro is married to Lolo Stephanie Nirmala Ofonagoro (née Lobo) of Mumbai, India, who holds the following traditional titles in Nigeria:

- Lolo Duruishimbu of Amaigbo
- Lolo Ugbala Duruofo II of Amaigbo
- Lolo Ugochinyere Igbo II of Amaigbo
- Lolo Eze Nwanyi Nike
- Lolo Ugosimba Enugwu-Uku

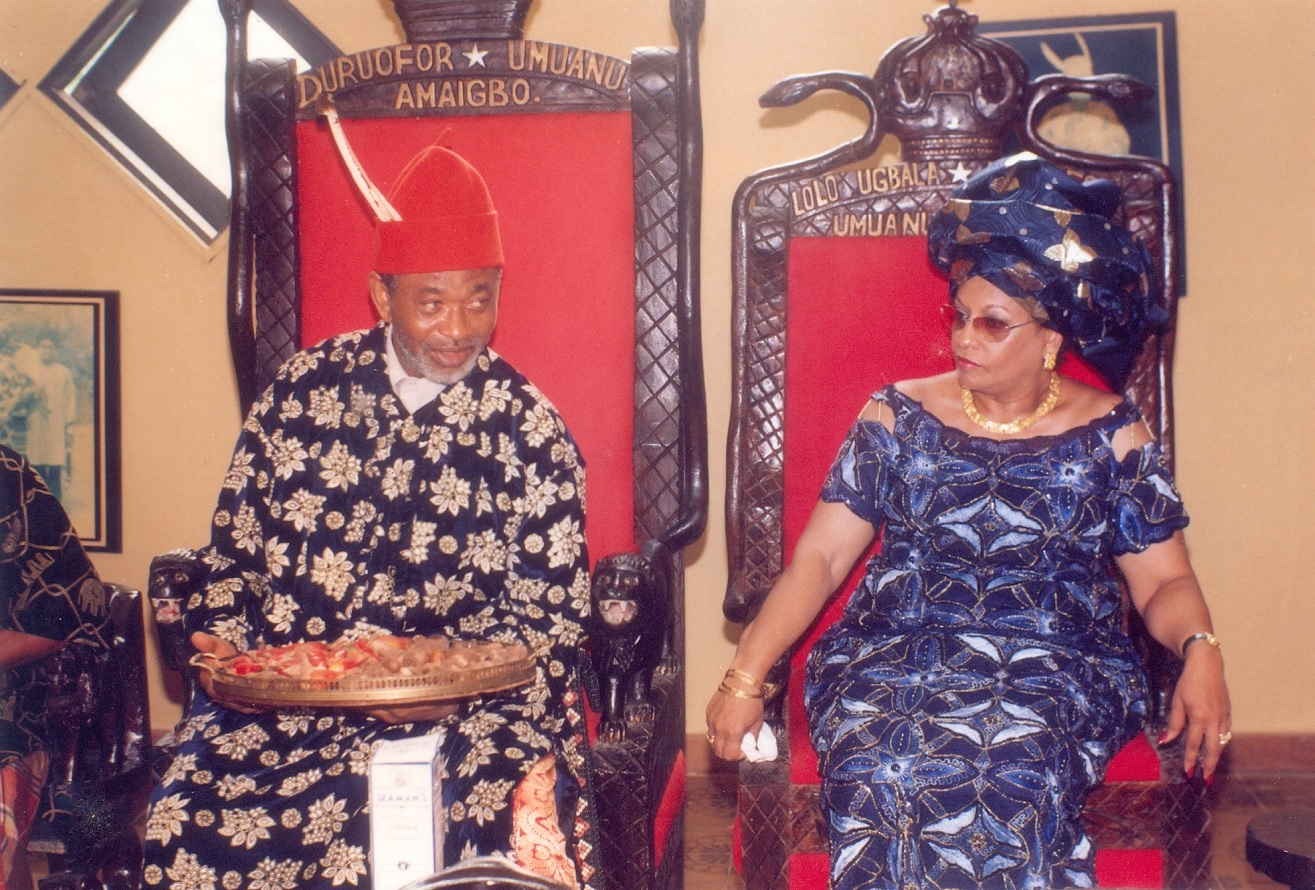
Ofonagoro with his wife, Lolo Stephanie Ofonagoro, in their palace at Umuobi, Amaigbo

An educationist, Mrs. Ofonagoro earned her bachelor's degree and master's degrees in early childhood education from the City University of New York, 1973 and 1975 respectively, and was in 1978, appointed Head of University of Lagos Women's Society Nursery School. A position which she held until 2003 when she retired. Earlier, she had taught at the Muslim Teacher Training College, Surulere, Lagos. She has since established a creche in Ikoyi known as Cuddles Daycare. Dr. and Mrs. Ofonagoro have four children: one daughter and three sons.

Ofonagoro is a life member of the Imo State Chapter of the Nigeria Red Cross, and patron of various student unions, youth clubs and chapters of the Nigerian Union of Journalists across the country. He is also a registered trustee of Amaigbo Town Union. He is a member of the Board of Trustees of St. Mary's Joint Hospital Amaigbo, and Patron of Nze na Ozo Titleholders Society of Amaigbo. He currently resides at his country home, Duruishimbu Villa, Umuobi, Amaigbo, Imo State.

== Awards, honours, prizes and accolades ==
- National Festival of Arts Prize in Literature 1959
- Elder Dempster Lines/ Federal Ministry of Education Students Exchange Programme to the UK 1959
- African Students Foundation of Canada Scholarship 1962–1966
- James Handerson Prize in History, Trinity College Toronto 1963
- Maurice Cody Prize in History University of Toronto 1965
- The Falconer Prize of Trinity College Literary and Debating Society 1965
- USA/UNESCO Fellowship 1966–1970
- AFGRAD Fellowship of the African American Institute 1966–1970
- Faculty Fellowship of Columbia University 1966–1970
- Honours Fellowship of the School of International Affairs, Columbia University 1968
- The Woodrow Wilson Dissertation Fellowship 1969–1970
- The Travelling Fellowship of Columbia University 1969–1970
- Faculty Post-Doctoral Fellowship of the City University of New York 1975
- Okaa Omee of Umuode Amaigbo 1982
- Pioneered Outstanding Performance Awards in the Media and Performing Arts, with the NTA Star Performer Awards 1983
- Inherited from his ancestors the Ozo Title of Nze Amaigbo Duruofo II 1985
- Ike Obodo Amandugba 1989 (Imo State)
- Inherited the traditional Title of Duruishimbu V of Umuanu Amaigbo 1990
- Nwanwa Bu Ugwu Isiekenesi 1990
- Elected Associate Fellow of the Historical Society of Nigeria 1991
- Ugochineyere Igbo II of Amaigbo 1993
- Oji Oma Edu, Owerri, 1995
- Okwu Du Nka Enugwu – Ukwu (NRI) 1995
- Ogbufuta Igbo Mma, Neni, 1995
- Ike Obodo Nike 1995
- Onu Na – Ekwuru Oha of Orlu Zone Imo State 1995
- Fellow of the Nigerian Institute of Public Relations 1996
- Elected Fellow of the Commonwealth Journalists Association of London UK 1997
- Ada Idagha Ke Efik Eburutu, by Obong of Calabar, Cross River State, Nigeria, October 1997
- Paul Harris Fellow, Rotary International 2002
- Named as one of the 2000 Outstanding Intellectuals of the 21st Century by the International Biographical Centre Cambridge England 2002
- Distinguished Service Award from the Department of History, University of Lagos 2004
- Recipient of the Nollywood Outstanding Personality Award 2009
- Created and Elevated to the Distinguished Order of the Knights of St. Christopher (KSC) 1989 in the Anglican Communion, for services to the Mission of the Church World Wide
- Recipient of 25 academic awards and fellowships
- Head of Nze na Ozo Title Elders of Umuanu Amaigbo, and Patron of Nze na Ozo Amaigbo

== Publications ==
Ofonagoro has published extensively in Canada, United States, United Kingdom, Europe and Africa. Among his long list of publications are the following:

- Trade and Imperialism in Southern Nigeria 1881–1929 - published by Nok Publishers, New York (1979)
- Readings in Federalism - published by Nigerian Institute of International Affairs (1979), co-edited with A.B. Akinyemi, and Patrick Dele Cole
- The Currency Revolution in Southern Nigeria 1880–1948 - published by African Studies Center, University of California Los Angeles (1976)
- The Story of Nigerian General Elections - published by the Federal Ministry of Information, Lagos (1979)
- The Great Debate: Nigerian Viewpoints on the Draft Constitution - published by Daily Times Press (1977), co-edited with Abiola Ojo, and Adele Jinadu
- From Traditional to British Currency in Southern Nigeria: Analysis of a Currency Revolution 1880–1948 - published in Journal of Economic History Vol. 39 No. 3 (1979)
- Tarikh Vol. 5 No. 4: The African Diaspora (The African Presence in North America) - published by Longman Press (1978)
- The Aro and Delta Middlemen of Southeastern Nigeria and the Challenge of the Colonial Economy - published in the Journal of African Studies Vol. 3 No. 2 (1976). First presented at Annual Meeting of African Studies Association, Philadelphia 1972.

== See also ==
- Amaigbo
- Imo State
- List of University of Toronto alumni
- Holy Family College, Abak
- List of Columbia University people in politics, military and law
