= Ikot Akpa Nkuk =

- Hquarters Town
- Etymology: Ukanafun Ino Anem
- Interactive map of Ikot Akpa Nkuk
- Country: Nigeria
- States: Akwa Ibom State
- LGA.: Ukanafun
- Time zone: UTC+1 (WAT)

Ikot Akpa Nkuk is a town as well as the Local Government Headquarters of Ukanafun in Akwa Ibom State, Nigeria. It is also one among the major towns of the Ukanafun South District/Clan.

== Climate ==
In Ikot Akpa Nkuk, the wet season is overcast and warm, the dry season is hot and mostly overcast, and it is oppressive year round. Over the course of the year, the temperature typically varies from 19 °C (66 °F) to 32 °C (90 °F) and is rarely below 15 °C (59 °F) or above 34 °C (93 °F).
