= Ishiet Erong =

- Village
- Interactive map of Ishiet Erong
- Country: Nigeria
- State: Akwa Ibom
- Local Government Area: Etinan

Ishiet Erong is a village in Etinan local government area of Akwa Ibom State.
