= Inen Clan =

Inen
- Clans
- Country: Nigeria
- State: Akwa Ibom State
- LGA: Oruk Anam

Inen popularly known as Inen Ekeffe Is one of the nine Clans in Oruk Anam local government area. And it is numbered as the one among the nine Administrative Areas of the Oruk Anam with its people speaking the Annang language in Akwa Ibom State the southern region of Nigeria.

== History ==
Inen Clan is subdivided into nineteen (19) towns and villages and among them as their major towns include;

Ikot Ibritam, Ikot Ekpuk, Ikot Etim 11, Etok Inen, Asakpa, Okukuk, Ikot Eduep, Oku Uruk, Etok Nkwo, Mbiaso, Ikot Offiong, Ikot Akpaya, Ikot Eteye. and other. The area is naturally rich with her resources.
