= Ikot Etakpo =

- Village
- Interactive map of Ikot Etakpo
- Country: Nigeria
- State: Akwa Ibom
- Local Government Area: Etinan

Ikot Etakpo is a village in Etinan local government area of Akwa Ibom State of Nigeria.
