= Otoabasi Akpan =

Nigerian historian and university administrator

- Akpan 2026
- Born: Otoabasi Etim Akpan; 15 June 1964 (age 62); Ikot Obio Atai, Itam, Itu, Akwa Ibom State, Nigeria
- Education: University of Calabar (BA); University of Ibadan (MA); Ahmadu Bello University (PGDE); University of Jos (MSc); University of Port Harcourt (PhD)
- Occupations: Historian; academic; university administrator
- Employer: Akwa Ibom State University
- Title: Vice Chancellor of Akwa Ibom State University
- Children: 5

Otoabasi Etim Akpan (born 15 June 1964) is a Nigerian historian, scholar of international relations and diplomacy, and university administrator. He is the Vice Chancellor of Akwa Ibom State University (AKSU), having been appointed acting Vice Chancellor in August 2025 and later confirmed in the substantive post. He is also National President of the College of Professors in Nigeria (COPiN). His published work deals mainly with Nigerian security, the Gulf of Guinea and national development.

== Early life and education ==
Akpan was born on 15 June 1964 in Ikot Obio Atai, Itam, in the Itu Local Government Area of Akwa Ibom State, to parents who were both teachers. He began primary school in the former Western Region, in what is now Oyo State, and finished in 1974. He took his secondary school certificate in 1979 at Lutheran High School, Obot Idim, Akwa Ibom State.

He earned a Bachelor of Arts degree in History from the University of Calabar in 1984, then completed his National Youth Service Corps year at the Advanced Teachers' Training College, Kafanchan, in southern Kaduna State (1984–1985). He went on to the University of Ibadan for a master's degree in the History of Ideas and obtained a Postgraduate Diploma in Education from Ahmadu Bello University, Zaria, in 1988. In 1989 he began a second master's degree, in International Relations and Strategic Studies, at the University of Jos. He received a PhD in Diplomatic Studies from the University of Port Harcourt in 2003.

== Career ==
=== Early positions ===
Akpan's first professional post was as a research assistant to Jan George at the School of Oriental and African Studies, from August 1986 to May 1987. Back in Nigeria he served as Dean of Studies at Akpur College, Ikyurav-Shange Tiev, near Gboko in Benue State. From January 1994 to April 1996 he worked as a research executive at Brains-Trust Research Consultants in Lagos.

=== University of Uyo ===
He began his academic career in February 1997 as an assistant lecturer at the University of Uyo. In 1998 he took part in curriculum development when International Studies was added to his department's programmes.

=== Akwa Ibom State University ===
Akpan joined AKSU in 2013 as Head of the Department of History and International Studies and later became Dean of the Faculty of Arts. He was the first head of the university's Directorate of International Collaborations and Linkages, where he coordinated academic partnerships, including agreements with the University of Innsbruck in Austria (2018), Temple University in the United States (2018) and the South China Sea Institute of Oceanology in Guangzhou, China (2019). He also served as Dean of the Faculty of Natural and Applied Sciences, chaired the Senate Curriculum Committee and the Academic Planning Committee, and sat on the university's Governing Council.

He later held office as Deputy Vice Chancellor. Sources differ on the title: reports of his 2025 appointment describe him as Deputy Vice Chancellor (Administration), while the Historical Society of Nigeria and other accounts refer to him as Deputy Vice Chancellor (Academics).

=== Vice Chancellor ===
On 5–6 August 2025 the AKSU Governing Council appointed Akpan acting Vice Chancellor, succeeding Nse Essien. He was subsequently appointed substantive Vice Chancellor, the fourth person to hold the post, with the Akwa Ibom State Government confirming the appointment on 23 February 2026. The Ibibio advisory council Ifim Ibom Ibibio welcomed Governor Umo Eno's reappointment of the Pro-Chancellor and the Vice Chancellor. In his capacity as Vice Chancellor he presided over a combined convocation covering the 2021/2022 to 2024/2025 academic sessions.

=== Fellowships and visiting posts ===
Akpan held a sabbatical fellowship at the National Defence College in Abuja and a visiting professorship at the University of Abuja Leadership Center.

== Professional and public roles ==
- National President, College of Professors in Nigeria (COPiN)
- Dean, Ibibio Academics Roundtable
- Chairman, Mary Slessor Institute for African Policy
- Member, Historical Society of Nigeria

== Scholarship ==
Akpan's research centres on security studies, diplomacy, Nigerian politics and the political economy of the Gulf of Guinea. AKSU held his fifth inaugural lecture on 27 June 2024, on themes of security and development.

=== Books ===
- Akpan, Otoabasi (2013). War and Conquest Without Weapons: Tactics and Strategies of Scorching – The Phenomenon of Boko Haram in Nigeria. Adonis & Abbey Publishers. ISBN 978-1-909112-34-6.
- Akpan, Otoabasi (2013). An Introduction to the Modern Gulf of Guinea: People, History, Political Economy and Strategic Future. Adonis & Abbey Publishers. ISBN 978-1-909112-35-3.

=== Selected chapters and papers ===
- Akpan, Otoabasi (2013). "The military in peace support operations in Nigeria: a question mark!" (PDF). ECAS 2013. ISCTE-IUL.
- "The imperatives of the doctrine of separation of powers for political stability"
- "Tragedy at midday: oil and underdevelopment of Nigeria"
- "National leadership and nation building in Nigeria"
- "The rise and fall of major world powers: lessons for Nigeria in Africa"

== Personal life ==
According to the university, Akpan is married and has five children, three daughters and two sons.
