= Ikot Nsung =

- Village
- Interactive map of Ikot Nsung
- Country: Nigeria
- State: Akwa Ibom
- Local Government Area: Etinan

Ikot Nsung is a village in Etinan local government area of Akwa Ibom State.
