= Afaha Iman =

Village in Akwa Ibom State, Nigeria

- Village
- Interactive map of Afaha Iman
- Coordinates: 5°1′58.310″N 7°55′3.608″E
- Country: Nigeria
- State: Akwa Ibom
- Local Government Area: Etinan

Afaha Iman is a village in the Etinan local government area of Akwa Ibom State, Nigeria.
