= Ekpo Nka-Owo =

Ancestral spirit of Ibibio mythology

Ekpo Nka-Owo is an Ibibio and Annang ancestral spirit that was mostly used to protect marriages between couples.

The spirit is said to only attack when a woman commits adultery in a marriage. It is believed that the spirit torments the wife during the birth of a child, and it is expected of her to confess to her husband and Ekpri Akata (spirit of the departed) before she can smoothly give birth. If she does not confess, the Ekpri Akata will either inflict her or kill her.

It is also said to kill the baby during pregnancy in some parts of the Ibibio culture
