= Ikot-Abasi =

Ikot Abasi
- Town and LGA
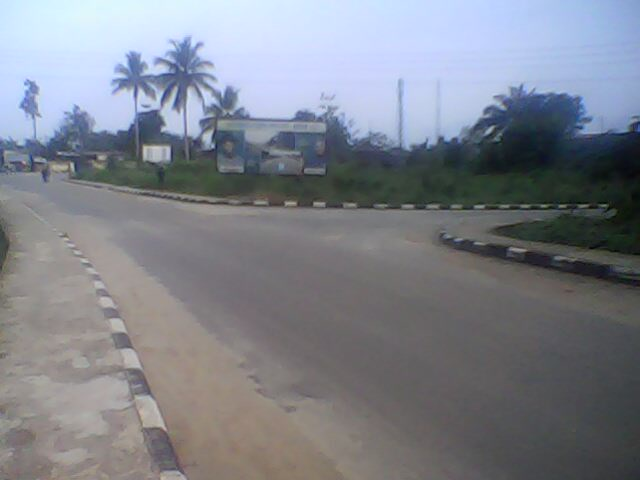
- Nickname: Alu City
- Interactive map of Ikot Abasi
- Location in Nigeria
- Coordinates: 4°38′0″N 7°39′0″E
- Country: Nigeria
- State: Akwa Ibom State
- LGA: Ikot Abasi
- Headquarters: Ikot Abasi

Government
  - Type: Traditional
  - Chairman: Hon Ime Williamson Essien

Area
  - Total: 280.8 km^{2} (108.4 sq mi)

Population (2022)
  - Total: 169,200
  - Density: 602.6/km^{2} (1,561/sq mi)
- Time zone: UTC+1 (WAT)
- Postal code: 534001
- Climate: Am
- Website: web.archive.org/web/20111006012428/http://www.aksgonline.com/lga.aspx?qrID=ikotabasi

Ikot AbasiAudio is a town and local government area located in the south west corner of Akwa Ibom State, Nigeria. It is bounded by Oruk Anam Local Government Area in the north, Mkpat Enin and Eastern Obolo Local Government Areas in the east and the Atlantic Ocean in the south. The Imo River forms the natural boundary in the west separating it from Rivers State. The Federal University of Technology Ikot Abasi is a federal government-owned university located in Ikot-Abasi.

Ikot Abasi is one of the 31 local government area of Akwa Ibom State. It is surrounded by Eastern Obolo and Mkpat Enin local government areas (all in Akwa Ibom State). The primary language that is spoken is the ibibio language. The villages in Ikot Abasi include Essene, Ete, Uta Ewa, Edem Aya, etc.

== Districts ==
Ikpa Ibekwe District

1. Ata Udo Usung
2. Ikong Ukpo Inwa
3. Ikot Aba
4. Ikot Abasi
5. Ikot Akpan Ata
6. Ikot Essien
7. Ikot Etetuk
8. Ikot Obong
9. Ikpetim
10. Uta Ewa

Edemaya District

1. Atan Eka Iko
2. Atan Ikpe
3. Ediduo
4. Iboro
5. Ikot Aboa Ndia
6. Ikot Akpabo
7. Ikot Akpan
8. Ikot Efre
9. Ikot Eneni
10. Ikot Etenge Ndom
11. Ikot Eyen Imo
12. Ikot Ikara
13. Ikot Iyire
14. Ikot Ndien
15. Ikot Obio Akpan
16. Ikot Obio Ekpe
17. Ikot Oboro Enyin
18. Ikot Okpok
19. Ikot Ubo Akama
20. Ikot Ufot
21. Ikot Unya
22. Ikot Uso Ide
23. Ukan

Ikpa Nung Clan

1. Ikot Imoh
2. Essene
3. Akpabom
4. Nduk
5. Ikot Etefia
6. Ikot Oboi Oko
7. Ikot Ada Udo
8. Nda Ekom
9. Ikot Edoho
10. Ikot Akpa Enin
11. Ikot Usop
12. Ikot Akpa Idiang
13. Ikot Uboh Ekpe

== History ==
Because of its location at the break in the mangrove swamp and rain forest of the eastern Niger River delta, it was a collecting point for slaves in the 19th century.

Ikot Abasi, a community in then Calabar Province, for good reasons. Although Ikot Abasi was already on the world map before 1929, the women's uprising against Nigeria's colonial rulers in 1929 was to provide a further push into prominence for this town, then already popular as the site of a boat yard, seat of a British consulate.

Three-quarters of a century ago, Ikot Abasi was the town whose women bravely took exception to what they considered exploitative excesses of the British rulers of the then non-independent Nigeria.

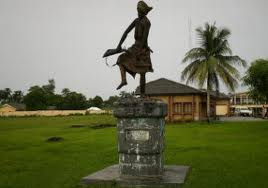
Sculpture for the slain Women

In 1995, the year of that Beijing conference, the National Gallery of Modern Art, Lagos (NGA) put out book about the women's revolt of 1929. The book, which features contributions from academics like Prof. Monday E. Noah, Prof. Obaro Ikime and Chief N.U. Akpan, documents how one of the women killed by the colonial forces during the 1929 protest was the mother of a boy, Egbert. That boy would later grow into a jurist and administrator, justice Egbert Udo Udoma. Such was the impact of the reforms that trailed the women's protest that the March 8, 1933 issue of the Daily Times described the changes as "the great charter of liberty for the people" but the prize did not come easy. Prof. M. E. Ekpo, another of the book's contributors, revealed that in the Calabar Province alone, more than 53 people were killed beside over 50 others injured.

Launched in 1989, in commemoration of the 60th anniversary of the uprising, the women's revolt of 1929 is an anthology of select papers from a national symposium on the subject, which took place in Port-Harcourt in 1982. According to Dr Paul Chike Dike, editor of the anthology, "An attempt by the (protesting) women to move nearer the colonial troops led to the order to shoot, in which over 24 women were killed".

== Geography ==
Until the 1970s, the ancient Opobo Kingdom was part of then South Eastern State (later re-Christened Cross River). However, a boundary adjustment exercise split Opobo. Opobo Island was made part of Rivers State while the mainland part was seeded to the original owners who are the Ibibio People within Cross River. That area, renamed Ikot Abasi, now lies in present-day Akwa Ibom State. Sources say ancient Ikot Abasi referred to smaller settlement but the name has assumed a more or less generic dimension in recent times. In the larger sense, today's Ikot Abasi comprises five clans: Ikpa Edemaya, Ikpa Ibekwe, Ukpum Ete , Ukpum Okon, Edemaya and Ikpa Nnung Asang. The palace of the paramount ruler of Ikot Abasi is within Ukpum Okon Clan.

Ikot Abasi once hosted a British Consulate, which is how one of the major streets here, Consulate Road, came by its name. At the roundabout leading to Consulate Road, the tourist would notice a statue of the late Justice Udo Udo Udoma, the first Nigerian to bag a Doctor of Philosophy (PhD) in law. The deceased legend's other achievements included his appointment as Chairman, Constituent Assembly (1977–1979), Chief Justice of Uganda (1963–1969) and Governor-General of that African Great Lakes country in 1963. Sauntering down Consulate Road, the wayfarer is likely to find one or two decent eateries not long after walking past Beracah Chambers, a law office. Further down this road, stands the Local Government Secretariat.

Overlooking the river, which separates Ikot Abasi from Opobo Island, are a number of bungalows. One or two of these blocks serve as offices of the Ikot Abasi Traditional Rulers Council. Opposite these chiefs' secretariat, across a narrow asphalt lane, is a monument that was unveiled on December 16, 1985 by Justice Udoma. The spot, where the sculpture has been installed, is believed to be the place that some of the women were martyred in 1929.

== Tourism ==
The area is dotted with a number of tourist attractions. The beachfront at Uta Ewa, the Berger Jetty along Uta Ewa creek and the coastline all attract tourists.

== Natural resources ==
The abundant gas and oil deposits have attracted many establishments to the area. The oil fields include, Utapate (onshore). Adna (offshore) and Asabo

== Climate ==
Precipitation is most in July, and least in January. Humidity is most prevalent in July and August. The windiest month is August. It is more sunny in December to January.

The length of the day in Ikot Abasi does not vary substantially over the course of the year, but daylight is slightly less in December to January. The best time of year for hot-weather activities is from late November to late January.

== Agricultural resources ==
Arable agricultural produce include cassava, yam, sweet yam, taro and maize while cash crops are not limited to oil palm, coconut, raffia, rubber and palm kernel. There is an abundant forest reserve for timber and wild life while commercial fishing thrives in the area. Although known for boat-building, a sand bar partially blocks the entrance to its port from the Gulf of Guinea. Ikot Abasi is also a home to Alscon, the biggest aluminium smelter plant in Africa.

== People ==
The people of Ikot Abasi are made up of the Ibibio ethnic group with diverse cultural heritage and tradition. They speak the Ibibio language.

Ikot Abasi is made up of five clans namely: Edemaya Clan, Ikpa Ibekwe Clan, Ikpa Nnung Assang Clan, Ukpum Ette Clan and Ukpum Okon Clan.

== Notable People from Ikot Abasi LGA ==
Ikot Abasi LGA has continued to be relevant in shaping the collective fate of geographical entities it belongs to, including in pre-colonial Nigeria, during the colonial era, and post-Colonial Nigeria.

1. Egbert Udo Udoma
2. Nsima Ekere

== Political Wards ==
Wards	Ward Centers
Ukpum Ete 1	Methodist Central School, Ete I
Ukpum Ete 2	Customary Court, Ikot Akan
Ukum Okon	Primary School, Okon (Obom)
Edemaya 1	Primary School, No. 1 Ukan
Edemaya 2	Primary Sch., Ikot Ubo Akama
Edemaya 3	Primary Sch., Atan Ikpe
Ikpa Ibekwe 1	Salvation Army Pri. Sch., Ibekwe
Ikpa Ibekwe 2	St. Theresa’s Pri. Sch., Ibekwe
Ikpa Ibekwe 3	Primary Sch., Ikot Etetuk
Ikpa Nung Asang 1	Ikpa Nung Asang 1
Ikpa Nung Asang 2	Primary School, Nduk
Ikpa Nung Asang 3	Primary School, Ikot Osudu
