= Amaigbo =

Town in Imo state, Nigeria

- town
- Location in Nigeria
- Coordinates: 5°43′N 7°45′E
- Country: Nigeria
- State: Imo state
- LGA: Nwangele
- Time zone: UTC+1 (WAT)

Amaigbo is a large town in Imo State, Nigeria. It is the headquarters of Nwangele Local Government Area. Amaigbo is regarded by many historians as the cradle of Igbo civilization.

The town has an official post office.

== Notable people ==
- Chief Dr. Walter Ofonagoro of Umuobi - former Minister of Information and Culture (Federal Republic of Nigeria) and former Director-General of the Nigerian Television Authority
- King Jaja of Opobo - sold into slavery in pre-colonial Nigeria
- Dick Tiger - late boxer

Pastor Chidi Ezimako-Pastor, tele ev
