= Asangaon Budruk =

Village in Maharashtra

Asangaon Budruk Asangaon Bk.
- village
- Location in Maharashtra, India Asangaon Budruk (India)
- Coordinates: 19.8967225°N 72.7363158°E
- Country: India
- State: Maharashtra
- District: Palghar
- Taluka: Dahanu
- Elevation: 9 m (30 ft)

Population (2011)
  - Total: 1,666
- Time zone: UTC+5:30 (IST)
- 2011 census code: 551731

Asangaon Budruk is a village in the Palghar district of Maharashtra, India. It is located in the Dahanu taluka.

== Demographics ==
According to the 2011 census of India, Asangaon Budruk has 373 households. The effective literacy rate (i.e. the literacy rate of population excluding children aged 6 and below) is 79.33%.

Demographics (2011 Census)
	Total	Male	Female
Population	1666	819	847
Children aged below 6 years	210	108	102
Scheduled caste	3	2	1
Scheduled tribe	503	253	250
Literates	1155	636	519
Workers (all)	794	454	340
Main workers (total)	652	405	247
Main workers: Cultivators	66	47	19
Main workers: Agricultural labourers	113	59	54
Main workers: Household industry workers	29	9	20
Main workers: Other	444	290	154
Marginal workers (total)	142	49	93
Marginal workers: Cultivators	22	10	12
Marginal workers: Agricultural labourers	16	5	11
Marginal workers: Household industry workers	2	0	2
Marginal workers: Others	102	34	68
Non-workers	872	365	507
