= Wayfarer =

A wayfarer is a person who travels on foot. It may also refer to:

== Literature ==
- The Wayfarer (novel), a 1912 novel by Natsume Sōseki
- Wayfarer, a book in the Faery Rebels series by Canadian author R. J. Anderson
- Wayfarers, a series of sci-fi novels (2015-2021) by Becky Chambers

== Music ==
- The Wayfarers Trio, an American folk band
- The Wayfarers, an Australian folk band
- Wayfarer (album), a 1983 album by Jan Garbarek
- The Wayfarer, a 2011 album by Richard Warren
- "Wayfarer", a 1996 song by In Flames from The Jester Race
- "Wayfarer", a 2002 song by Hot Water Music from Caution
- "The Wayfarer", a 2002 track by Finnish symphonic metal band Nightwish from "Ever Dream"
- "The Wayfarer", a 2002 song by Nightwish from Century Child
- "Wayfarer", a 2003 song by Kayo Dot from Choirs of the Eye
- "The Wayfarer", a 2010 trilogy of songs by Winterfylleth from The Mercian Sphere
- "Wayfarer", a 2012 song by Audien
- "Wayfarer", a 2014 song by Nell Bryden
- "The Wayfarer", a 2019 song by Bruce Springsteen from Western Stars

== Transportation ==
- Wayfarer (dinghy), a class of sailboat
- Bristol Wayfarer, a twin-engine passenger aircraft
- Chrysler Wayfarer, built from 1958 to 1961
- Dodge Wayfarer, built from 1949 to 1952
- A bus built by Thomas Harrington & Sons from 1951 to 1961

== Other ==
- Wayfarer (typeface)
- The Wayfarer (painting), a c. 1500 painting by Hieronymus Bosch
- Ray-Ban Wayfarer, a model of sunglasses
- Wayfarers (role-playing game)
- A web browser for MorphOS
- A ship in the Doctor Who book Prisoner of the Daleks
- Batasari (Wayfarer), a 1961 Indian Telugu-language film
- Rahi (film) (Wayfarer), a 1953 Hindi film
- Viburnum lantana a genus of about 150–175 species of flowering plants
