= Asangaon, Dahanu =

Village in Maharashtra

Asangaon
- village
- Location in Maharashtra, India Asangaon (India)
- Coordinates: 19.9055329°N 72.7525697°E
- Country: India
- State: Maharashtra
- District: Palghar
- Taluka: Dahanu
- Elevation: 12 m (39 ft)

Population (2011)
  - Total: 1,333
- Time zone: UTC+5:30 (IST)
- 2011 census code: 551732

Asangaon is a village in the Palghar district of Maharashtra, India. It is located in the Dahanu taluka.

== Demographics ==
According to the 2011 census of India, Asangaon has 321 households. The effective literacy rate (i.e. the literacy rate of population excluding children aged 6 and below) is 83.9%.

Demographics (2011 Census)
	Total	Male	Female
Population	1333	649	684
Children aged below 6 years	128	69	59
Scheduled caste	0	0	0
Scheduled tribe	26	14	12
Literates	1011	544	467
Workers (all)	642	379	263
Main workers (total)	422	301	121
Main workers: Cultivators	41	33	8
Main workers: Agricultural labourers	51	31	20
Main workers: Household industry workers	1	0	1
Main workers: Other	329	237	92
Marginal workers (total)	220	78	142
Marginal workers: Cultivators	64	18	46
Marginal workers: Agricultural labourers	71	31	40
Marginal workers: Household industry workers	4	2	2
Marginal workers: Others	81	27	54
Non-workers	691	270	421
