= Eno James Ibanga =

Nigerian academic

- Scientific career
- Fields: Solid state physics material science
- Workplaces: University of Calabar; University of Uyo

Eno James Ibanga is a Nigerian academic. He is a professor of solid state physics/materials science. He serves as the Vice Chancellor for Akwa Ibom State University (AKSU). On 3 August 2020, His Excellency Governor Udom Gabriel Emmanuel appointed Professor Eno James Ibanga as commissioner in the state ministry works & Fire service. He is married and blessed with children.

== Education ==
James Ibanga earned his PhD in Solid State Physics in 2000 from the University of Nigeria, Nsukka.

== Career ==
Ibanga began his career as a university lecturer at University of Calabar in 1982. He was appointed Professor of Physics in University of Uyo in 2008 and Head of Physics Department and Dean of Student Affairs. Ibanga is a Physics lecturer. He was Associate Professor in Nassarawa State University, Keffi, in 2004 and a Senior Lecturer, University of Agriculture, Makurdi in 2002. He was a lecturer in the University of Agriculture, Abeokuta in 1986.

Ibanga was a Visiting Lecturer to various institutions including Akwa Ibom State University from 2009 - 2013, Benue State University, Makurdi, 2006-2011 and University of Agriculture, Makurdi, 2007-2010. His is an external examiner for University of Abuja; Ladoke Akintola University of Science and Technology, Ogbomosho; University of Ilorin and Obafemi Awolowo University. He has been a member of Faculty Senates, Boards and Committees in these Universities. He served NUC as member and also chairman of accreditation panels of degree programmes in physical sciences.
