= Ekpo Society =

Cultural society art form of the Efik, Ibibio and Annang people of southern Nigeria

Ekpo
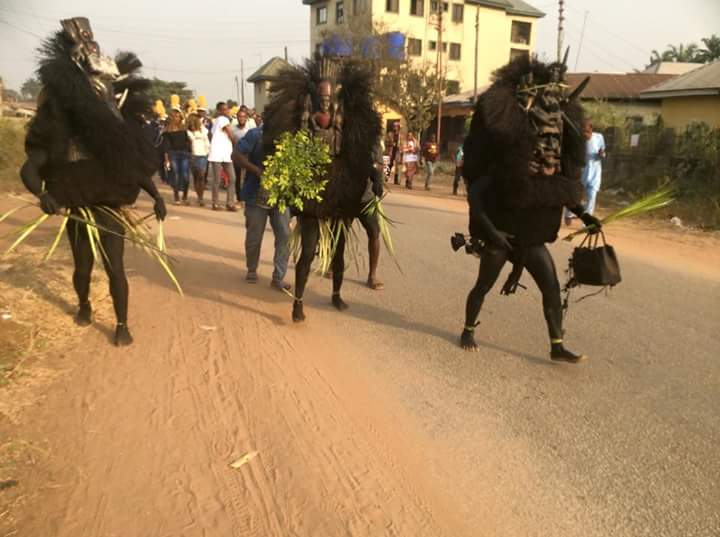

Regions with significant populations
- Annang, Ibibio , Igbo

Ekpo (Ghost or Spirit) is a cultural society art form that originates from the Annang and Ibibio people of Akwa Ibom in Southern Nigeria. The practice was also adopted by neighboring regions, namely, Arochukwu and Ohafia (Abia state) during the expansion of the Aro-Kingdom.

== History ==
=== In the 21st century ===
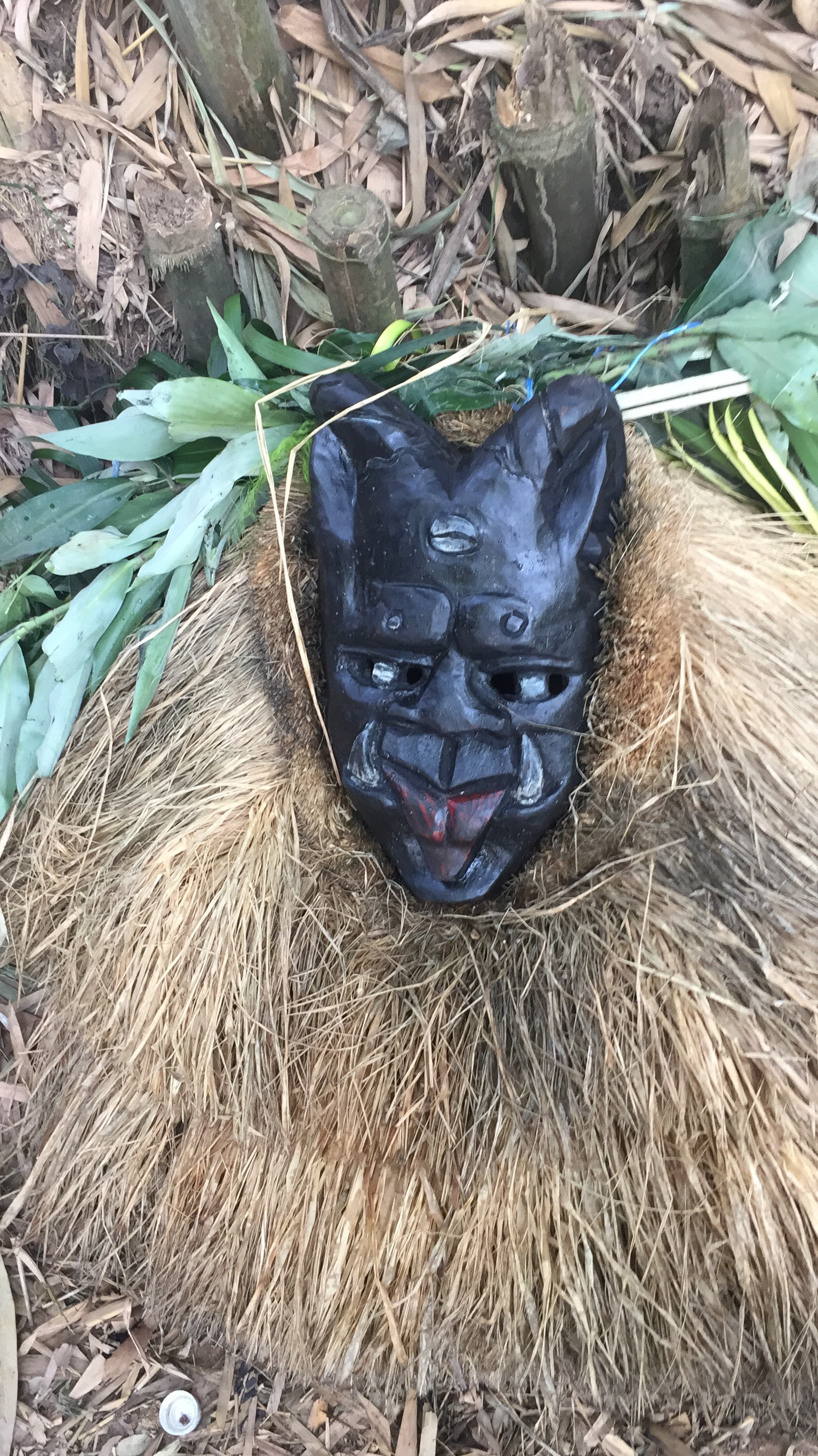
Ekpo Masquerade face

Owing to the advent of Christianity and modern civilization, the Ekpo masquerade is no longer regarded as dead souls that come back to the land of the living; instead, it is now known to be costumes worn by living humans and is regarded as an integral part of the culture and heritage of the people.

== See also ==
- Ekpo Nka-Owo
