= Ntak Ibesit =

Ntak Ibesit is a densely populated rural town in Akwa Ibom State of Nigeria.

== History ==
The road linking Ikot Afanga town and Ntak Ibesit (Usung Nun Anwa) was named after a man called Udo Anwa-the Man Leopard. He was a commander who was arrested during the Ekpe Ikpa Ukot War, of the late 1940s. The MAN LEOPARD killings were believed to be one war fought, in the southern Annang, to draw the attention of the colonial administrators to the plight of the locals in the area, who were regarded mainly as drawers of waters and hewers of wood. The struggle has engaged the attention of many authors internationally.

Ikot Okoro, which is about 4 km (2.5 mi) away from Ntak Ibesit is a tourist destination, mostly to those who would like to study the settlement patterns of the colonial administrators. They were headquartered there as the administrative centre of the southern Annang.

Following the colonial period, Ntak Ibesit saw a period of slowed infrastructural development, impacted by the Nigerian Civil War, failed government policies, and the subsequent decline of the Nigerian Institute for Oil Palm Research (NIFOR) sub-station in nearby Ibesit Ekoi. The sub-station had previously supported agricultural research in the region and owned farming facilities at Ekpene Okpo, Ntak Ibesit. The town has experienced some level of renewed development in recent years, including the expansion of the road network, the establishment of the Primary Health Post near St John's Axis, and the founding of Divine Favour Christian College in Ikot Udo Aduak by Bishop Ezekiel Ukoh.

The Akwa Ibom State Government has proposed to establish a skill acquisition centre for Ntak Ibesit to take care of youth un-employment.

== Postcode ==
the postcode is 533112.
