= Etim Ekpo =

- LGA and town
- Interactive map of Etim Ekpo
- Location within Nigeria
- Coordinates: 5°1′N 7°37′E
- Country: Nigeria
- State: Akwa Ibom State
- Headquarters: Utu Etim Ekpo

Government
  - Chairman: Gideon Uwah

Area
  - Total: 200.4 km^{2} (77.4 sq mi)

Population (2022)
  - Total: 135,200
  - Density: 674.7/km^{2} (1,747/sq mi)
- Time zone: UTC+1 (WAT)

Etim EkpoAudio is a town and Local Government Area in Akwa Ibom State, Nigeria. The area has 11 wards. It shares boundaries with Abia State, Abak, Ukan Afun and Ika local government areas.

== History ==
Created from the former Abak division, Etim Ekpo is one of the Annang-speaking areas. The seat of the local government council is in Utu Etim Ekpo a community in a Etim Ekpo. The inhabitants of this town is estimated to be 108,418, according to 2006 population census. Etim Ekpo Local Government Area is made up of four districts of seventy-four communities and villages. The people of this clime are predominantly subsistence farmer, traders and craftsmen. Natural resources in Etim Ekpo Local Government area are sharp sand, gravel, timber and oil-palm. The people of Etim Ekpo are mainly farmers, but the educated indigenes work as civil servants within and outside the local government area. In the area of education, there are many public and private secondary schools. The local government area is the home of one private university, the Obong university, located at Obong Ntak. The people of Etim Ekpo are vast in knowledge and every other creative activity.

== Geography ==
Etim Ekpo LGA observes two seasons which are the dry and the blustery seasons. The normal temperature of the area is 25 °C while the normal stickiness of the area is put at 88%. The normal absolute precipitation recorded in Etim Ekpo LGA is 3250 mm per year.

== Economy ==
Etim Ekpo LGA has significantly a lot of raw petroleum and flammable gas stores. Fishing is additionally a significant monetary movement nearby with the few streams and feeders in the areas being wealthy in fish. Other significant occupations of individuals of Etim Ekpo LGA incorporate kayak making, cultivating, and exchange.

== List of towns and villages in Etim Ekpo LGA ==
=== Uruk District ===
1. Atan
2. Atuai
3. Ete Edet
4. Ikot Akasor
5. Ikot Akpan Odomo
6. Ikot Ikpa
7. Ikot Inyang
8. Ikot Inyang Ekpo
9. Ikot Obio Nta
10. Ikot Udo Etor
11. Ntak Inyang
12. Uruk Ata Ikot
13. Uruk Ata Ikot Ebo
14. Uruk Ata Ikot Ekpor
15. Uruk Ata Ikot Isemin
16. Uruk Ata Ikot Otok
17. Uruk Ata Ikot Udedia
18. Uruk Ata Ikot-Akpankpan
19. Uruk Ata Nsidung
20. Uruk Ata Ikot Akpan

=== Ikono District ===
1. Ikot Akpa Nsek
2. Ikot Akpakpan
3. Ikot Edek
4. Ikot Iya
5. Ikot Obio Ema
6. Ikot Odong
7. Ikot Udo Nta
8. Ikpe Atai
9. Ikpe Ikot Akwa
10. Inen Ikot Okpo
11. Nto Edet
12. Nto Unang
13. Nung Oko Ikot
14. Nwot Ikono
15. Ikot Edet -Affia

=== Utu Etim District ===
1. Ekwet Ikot Ebo
2. Etek Utu Ikot Eboro
3. Ikot Akpan
4. Ikot Mboho
5. Ikot Nkim
6. Nto Obo
7. Uruk Ata Ikot Akpan
8. Uruk Eshiet
9. Utu Etim Ekpo
10. Utu Idung Akpan Udom
11. Utu Ikot Ekpo
12. Utu Ikot Imonte
13. Utu Ikot Nkor
14. Utu Nsekhe

=== Obong District ===
1. Abak Obong
2. Abat Town
3. Esa Obong
4. Ibio Edem Urua
5. Ibio Nung Achat
6. Ibio Nung Iba
7. Ikot Ama
8. Ikot Awak
9. Ikot Ese
10. Ikot Inung
11. Ikot Iya
12. Ikot Mkporikpo
13. Ikot Obio Ama
14. Ikot Udo Obong
15. Ikot Umo Ebat
16. Mkporikpo Utit-Idim
17. Ndot Obong
18. Obon Ebot
19. Obong Ata Essien
20. Obong Ikot Akpan
21. Obong Ntak
22. Obong Utit Idim
23. Omum Unyam
24. Otoro Obong
25. Udianga Enem

=== Utut Annang District ===
1. Ikot Nyah
2. Ikpe Annang
3. Uruk Ata 11
4. Iwukem
5. Edem Akai
6. Ikot Ayah
7. Ikot Ama
8. Ikot Esop

== Political Wards ==
Wards	Ward Centers
Etim Ekpo 1	Primary School, Utu Nsehe
Etim Ekpo 2	Primary School, Esa Obong
Etim Ekpo 3	Primary Sch., Uruk Ata Ikot Isemin
Etim Ekpo 4	Primary Sch., Utu Ikot Imonte
Etim Ekpo 5	St. Joseph Cath. Sch., Ikot Edet
Etim Ekpo 6	Primary Sch., Uruk Ata Nsidung
Etim Ekpo 7	Primary School, Eka Uruk Essiet
Etim Ekpo 8	Primary School, Obong Ntak
Etim Ekpo 9	Holy Rosery Pri. Sch., Ikot Udobong
Etim Ekpo 10	Primary School, Uruk Ata II
Etim Ekpo 11	Primary Sch., Iwukem
