= Ikot Afanga =

Ikot Afanga is a rural town in Akwa Ibom State, Nigeria.

This town featured prominently in the history of the "man-leopard murders" of Southern Annang. A series of murder victims were found in the 1940s, with injuries looking as if they had been caused by an attacking leopard, causing rumours about wereleopards in the area. In 1946, a man called Udo Anwa was arrested, tried and sentenced to death by hanging for the killings.

There is a major colonial road linking Ntak Ibesit and Ikot Afanga, named Nsiak Udo Anwa (Udo Anwa's Road).

Today, Ikot Afanga is a commercial centre noted for cassava production and distribution.
