= Anaang people =

Anaang
Total population
- 2.6 million (2015)

Regions with significant populations
- Akwa Ibom State (Nigeria)

Languages
- Anaang

Religion
- Christianity; Traditional Religion

Related ethnic groups
- Ibibio; Efik; Ekoi; Igbo; Oron; Ogoni; Bahumono

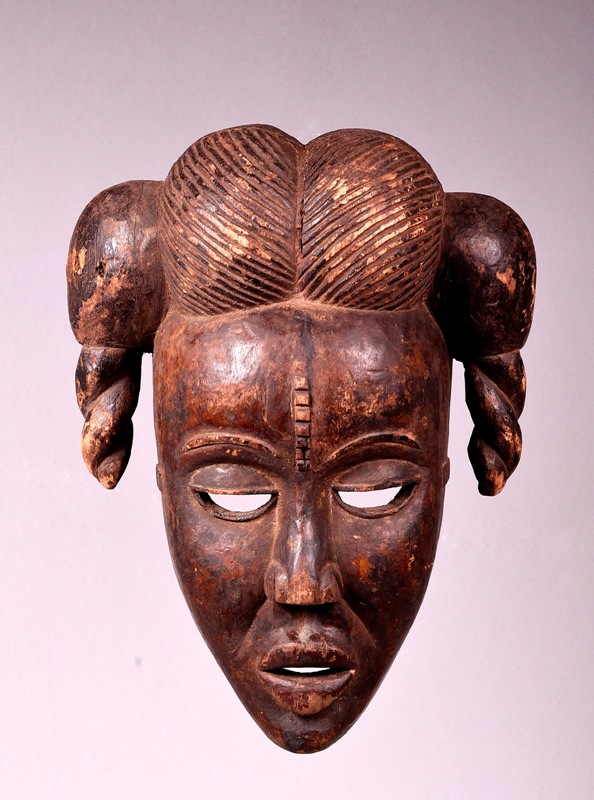
Anaang mask from the Passaré collection, Milan

Anaang (also spelled Annang and Ànnang) also known as Oku Ibom, is an ethnic group in Southern Nigeria, whose land is primarily within 8 of the present 31 Local Government Areas in Akwa Ibom State: Abak, Essien Udim, Etim Ekpo, Ika, Ikot Ekpene, Obot Akara, Oruk Anam, Ukanafun in Akwa Ibom State. The Anaang are the second largest ethnic group after the Ibibios in Akwa Ibom state.

The Anaang formerly included the former Abak and Ikot Ekpene Divisions of the Anaang Province, as well as part of the former Opobo Division of Uyo Province, in the former Eastern Region of Nigeria. The proper name for the Ika of Akwa Ibom is Ika-Annang, a reflection of their intimate connection to their Annang identity.

== History ==
=== Ancient origin ===
The predominant paternal haplogroup among the Anaang is E1b1a1-M2. The ancestors of the Anaang originally came from Northeast Africa and moved around the Green Sahara. The gradual movement of the Proto Anaang to the Cross River Region may have been associated with the expansion of Sahel agriculture in the African Neolithic period, following the desiccation of the Sahara in c. 3500 BCE.

=== Oral history ===
According to oral tradition, the Abiakpo came to the northern range of Anaang from Eka Abiakpo. They were quickly followed by the Ukana clan, the Utu, Ekpu, Ebom and Nyama (the British lumped these groups together and gave them the name Otoro), and other Anaang clans. The Anaang and the entire people of Akwa Ibom and Cross River states of Nigeria (AkwaCross people) have occupied their land in coastal Southeastern Nigeria for thousands of years.

The Anaang are related to the Ibibio and Efik communities. It is believed that the Anaang people originated from Egypt and began their migration from Egypt before settling in present-day Akwa-Ibom, Nigeria. Before their current settlement, they lived among the Akan of Ghana, where the name Anaang means "fourth son".

From Ghana, the group moved eastward into present-day Cameroon. It was in the Cameroon highlands that the group broke off but later reached the same territory in Coastal Southeastern Nigeria. Lineages were recognized and the groups organized into clans, based on old family origins known as Iman. Their northern neighbors, the Igbo, have a similar clan/community structure.

=== Written history ===
Very little was written about the Anaang people before the mid-19th century. Early European traders who arrived in the Cross River territories referred to groups who lived outside of the coastal areas as residents of Egbo-Sharry Country. The first written mention of the Anaangs is in Sigismund Koelle's account of liberated slaves in Sierra Leone. He mentioned a liberated slave named Ebengo who hailed from Nkwot in Abak. Ebengo was captured and sold to the Portuguese but was subsequently freed by a British warship and later settled in Waterloo, Sierra Leone. The British soldiers listed the languages spoken by the slaves in that captured ship as "Anaang". The second mention is a description of what is known as the Ikot Udo Obong Wars. The British described the killings of the Anaangs by King Jaja of Opobo as a punishment for defying his orders and trading in palm oil directly with the British merchants instead of going through him as a middleman. In the war that ensued, the British intervened and with the help of the Anaangs, they captured King Jaja and exiled him to the West Indies. The British established a military post at Ikot Ekpene in 1904.

Following British colonialism and with changes and ban in ancient hunting practices, the Anaang witnessed attacks by wild animals. As the men went to fight in World War II these attacks intensified. The British authorities called the attacks murder and blamed it on "the barbarism of the Africans". The Anaang were accused of belonging to a secret society called Ekpeowo (The Human Leopards Society). It has been argued that killings born out of insurgency against the British elsewhere in Africa led to the branding of leopard attacks as murders by the British authorities among the Anaang. Between 1945 and 1948 about 196 people were killed in Ikot Okoro community in the present-day Oruk Anam LGA; the Ikot Okoro Police station was set up because of this reason. The British convicted 96 people and executed 77 innocent people. The Anaang religion called Idiong was banned and the priests arrested. Articles and worship materials were publicly burnt and those who did not convert to Christianity automatically became suspects.

The Anaangs have a history and reputation for fearlessness and the ability of villages and clans to bind together to fight a common enemy. This is perhaps why they were able to thrive living so close to the Aro Confederacy's center, Arochukwu with its famed Ibini Ukpabi oracle. A particular interesting war group, or "Warrior cult", was the famous Oko warriors. This war group was highly functional in the 1950s. These warriors were considered invulnerable to penetration of knives, spears, and arrows. In various instances sharp machetes were tested on the body parts of members.

The Anaangs suffered genocide during the Nigerian Civil War. The war lasted for three years (1967–1970) and the Anaang lost a significant number of its people. The effect of the war and the resulting neglect of the Anaang is now a serious political discuss.

== Location ==
The Anaang people homeland is located in Akwa Ibom State , Southern Nigeria. The Annangs have lived in the Southeastern, coastal parts of Nigeria for centuries before the arrival of the Europeans. The political capital of the Anaang people is Ikot Ekpene Local Government Area.

== Culture ==
A brother/sister from the same Ilip, literally translated as "womb" means that they can trace their origin to the same mother or father. Those who can so trace their ancestry to the same parents form Ufok (literally a house or compound). Several ufoks make up Ekpuks or extended family and several Ekpuks (extended families) make up "Ilung" (meaning village) and several villages make up the "abie" or clan. This is in many ways similar to the system used by other south-eastern Nigerian peoples but more centralized.

Although leadership at the family, village, or clan level remains the prerogative of the men, lineage ties extends to women even after marriage. This is because the Anaang society was originally semi-matrilineal, just like a few other societies in Eastern Nigeria such as The Abiriba, Afikpo, and Ugep. There are many societies and associations (Ulim also called "udim") for men and women which are very important in traditional village life. Individuals are measured by both the number and types of memberships in Ulim and by the achievements of one or more Ulims. Governance is done by elderly males who act as the legislative arm called Afe Ichong, directed by the Abong Ichong (Village Chief and Clan Chief) who is the head and the chief executive but without the authority beyond what the Afe Ichong gives. A chief can be appointed by the Afe or can be an inherited office.

The Anaang speak the Annang language and perform a masquerade after the yam harvest to mark the visit of ancestral spirits, or ekpo. This is also the name of a men's associations that once had great influence among Ibibio groups. The Anang carve masks with grotesque features, known as iliok, which are considered dangerous and may only be viewed by members of the ekpo. Other masks embody the beautiful spirit, or mfon.

The strength of any individual, family (or group for that matter) is typically based upon a consensus of the village or clan through this complex social system. In all this, Anang women are not completely subordinate to men. Instead Anaang women are partners and leaders in many aspects of Anaang tradition, including serving as female chief priestesses "Abia Iyong" in the Iyong society or as healers in the healing society. The first-born female known as Aliaha is important and commands respect in the family and lineage. Some traditions hold that a woman's first birth should take place in her mother's compound. Women's organizations such as "abi-de" and "Nyaama", and "Isong Iban" play important roles in giving the women voice and status in society. There are no traditional or cultural barriers that prevent women from attaining high offices or positions.

Anaangs value the ability to speak well and oratory ability using proverbs is highly desirable, especially among the leaders. The American anthropologist, Peter Farb, stated that the name "Anaang" among this group means "they who speak well". An individual who has the gift of eloquent speech is often complimented as Akwo Anaang, meaning the "Man of Anaang".

=== Fattening room ===
The fattening room is traditionally where virgin adolescent girls were fattened up in preparation for marriage. A fattening room girl is known as a mbobo. This was an occasion for a major village celebration. As part of her preparation for marriage the girl was also instructed on how to be a wife. She would spend her time in the room naked so that her fattening could be observed, and would sleep on a bamboo bed which was thought to fatten her up. It was also meant to make it more possible for her to conceive easily.

This use for fertility purposes was also used at time for infertile wives and as a prerequisite for entrance into secret societies.

== Written language ==
The Annang language is also mutually intelligible to speakers of Ibibio, Efik, Oron, Eket (also known as Ekid) of the Akwa Akpa (Old Calabar Kingdom). Though the Anaang speech pattern was not written down, linguists have now produced an orthography of the language which makes it possible to produce written materials in the language (Idem & Udondata, 2001).

== Demographics ==
- Nigeria
  - Akwa Ibom State
  - Cross River State
  - Benue (Efik-Ibibio people are the fourth largest ethnic group of the original settlers of Benue of Nigeria)
- Equatorial Guinea (formerly Fernando Po)
- Cameroon
- Ghana

Overseas diaspora:

- Cuba
- West Indies

== Annang numbers ==
Numbers from zero to twelve:

No.	English	Annang
0	Zero	Ikpoikpo
1	One	Ked
2	Two	Iba
3	Three	Ita
4	Four	Inañ
5	Five	itien
6	Six	Itieked
7	Seven	Itiaba
8	Eight	Itieita
9	Nine	Ananked
10	Ten	Luop
11	Eleven	Luopeked
12	Twelve	Luopeba

== Delicacies ==
The Annang people have different delicacies such as Afang Soup, Alitan Soup, Okro Soup (Afere nkolo), Abak Atama, White Soup (Affia Efere), Asa Iwa, Ekpang Nkwukwor and many other delicacies which one can enjoy during vacation.

== See also ==
- Ekpo Annang
- Nsibidi
- Ikot Ekpene
