= Mkpat-Enin =

- LGA and town
- Interactive map of Mkpat-Enin
- Location within Nigeria
- Coordinates: 4°44′1″N 7°44′55″E
- Country: Nigeria
- State: Akwa Ibom State

Government
  - Executive Chairman: Hon. (Engr.) Emmanuel John Inyang

Area
  - Total: 397.2 km^{2} (153.4 sq mi)
- Elevation: 185 m (607 ft)

Population (2022)
  - Total: 226,200
  - Density: 569.5/km^{2} (1,475/sq mi)
- Time zone: UTC+1 (WAT)
- Website: http://mkpatenin.ak.gov.ng

Mkpat-EninAudio is located in the South South region of Nigeria and is a town and a Local Government Area (LGA) of Akwa Ibom State. It sits at an altitude of approximately 185 metres (607 ft) above sea level.

Mkpat Enin LGA has an area of 322.352 square kilometres (124.461 mi^{2}) and it's the second largest local government area in Akwa Ibom State. The LGA is located within the industrial belt extending from Eastern Obolo, Etinan, Oruk Anam, Onna, Ikot Abasi down to the Atlantic Ocean. The people are traditionally Ibibio speakers. The population was 178,036 based on the 2006 census. The area is rich in oil and natural gas; oil was discovered in Ikot Akpa/Ekop as early as 1953. Forest reserves in the local government area include timber and palm produce.

One of the campuses of the Akwa Ibom State University is located in this community.

The LGA has four clans and 87 villages:
The Present Chairman of Mkpat Enin LGA is Hon. (Engr.) Emmnauel John Inyang

Ikpa Ibom Clan (31 villages)
| Ikot AKata | Ikot Ayan | Ikot Akpaden | Ikot Edim | Ikot Akpaekop | Ikot Obio - Itong | Ikot Obio-Akai | Ikot Akpan |
| Ikot Ediongno | Ikot Etefia | Ikot Obong | Ikot Akpabio | Ikot Osong OtUK | Ikot Aba | Ikot Inyang Okop | Ikot Isighe |
| Ikot Eti | Ikot Enin | Ikot OkopOdong | Ikot UKwa | Ikot Oyoro | Ikot Obiondoho | Ekim | Ibioete |
| Ndon Obodom | Ikot Ekpang | Atanuk | Ikot Ekong | Ikot Obio Ekpong | Ibotio | Ndon | |

Ukpum Minya clan (24 villages)
| Etuk Nung Ukim | Eka Nung UKim | Ikot Udo Idem | Ikot Udo | Ikot Edeghe | Nkikara | Ibot | Asong |
| Ikot Ekop | Ikot Akpabio | Ikot Obio Okoi | Ikot Abia | Ata Minya | Ikot Akpa Okop | Ikot Etefia | Ikot EkaIdeh |
| Ikot Obong | Ikot Abasi | Ikot Ekp UK | Nung Ukim 3 | Ikot Ekpe | Mkpat Enin | Ikot Obio Akwa | Ikot Abasi Ufon |

Ikpa Ikono Clan (16 villages)
| Asana | Ikot Ekpaw | Ikot Obionso | Ibianga | Ekpuk | Ikot Esen AkpanNtuen | Ikot Abia Utok | Ikot Mkpeye |
| Ikot Edah | Ikot Unya | Iffe | Ikot Afang | Ikot Aba si Obio Nkan | Ikot Umiang Obio Nkan | Ikot Enyiene Obio Nkan | Iton |

Ibiaku Clan (16 villages)
| Ikot Ebak | Ikot Aka | Ikot Ntot | Ikot Etina | Ikot AkpaObong | Ibekwe Akpan Nya | Nya Odiong | Minya Ntak |
| Ikot Abia Enin | Ikot Abasi Akpan | Ikot Ekpenyong | Ndot Abat | Ikot Akanung Ikono Ekpene Ubium | Esa Ekpo | Ikot Idiong | Ibiaku |

It is part of the Ikot Abasi / Mkpat Enin / Eastern Obolo Constituency of the Nigerian House of Representatives. It is within the Catholic Diocese of Uyo.

== Economy ==
Mkpat Enin LGA contains petroleum and flammable gas. Oil and gas companies operating there contribute to the financial advancement of the area. Fishing is also a basic part of the economy. Farm crops include plantain and vegetables.

== Climate ==
Muggy conditions are most common in May and least common in January. The best time of year for hot-weather activities is from late November to late January.

== Political Wards ==
| Wards | Ward Centers |
|---|---|
| Ukpum Minya 1 | Primary School, Ibot |
| Ukpum Minya 2 | V/SQ, Ikot Udo Idem |
| Ukpum Minya 3 | QIC Sec. Sch., Minya |
| Ukpum Minya 4 | Village Hall, Ikot Ekop |
| Ukpum Minya 5 | Primary School, Mkpat Enin |
| Ikpa Ibom 1 | Ikot Obio Itong |
| Ikpa Ibom 2 | Primary Sch., Ukam |
| Ikpa Ibom 3 | Primary Sch., Ikot Obio Ndoho |
| Ikpa Ibom 4 | Primary Sch., Ikot Ekong |
| Ibiaku 1 | Primary School, Ikot Ebak |
| Ibiaku 2 | Primary Sch., Ikot Abasi Akpan |
| Ibiaku 3 | Sec. School., Esa Ekpo |
| Ikpa Ikono 1 | Primary Sch., Ikot Obio Nso |
| Ikpa Ikono 2 | Secondary Sch., Iffe |
| Ikpa Ikono 3 | Primary School, Ikot Umiang |
