= Ikot Okoro =

- Location within Nigeria
- Coordinates: 04°54′00″N 07°43′00″E
- Country: Nigeria
- State: Akwa Ibom State
- Elevation: 155 m (509 ft)

Population (2005)
  - Total: 50,000
- estimated
- Time zone: UTC+1 (WAT)

Ikot Okoro is a rural settlement of Akwa Ibom State and was one of the larger population concentrations in the now defunct South Eastern Nigeria. Now smaller, it is about 15 km (9.3 mi) southwest of the regional center of Abak. The people of Ikot Okoro have been clamoring for the creation of a local Government area (LGA) from the present day Oruk Anam LGA. Oruk Anam LGA incidentally happens to be one of the biggest LGA in Nigeria and as such grassroots development have not been felt in most part of the LGA especially in Ikot Okoro.

Ikot Okoro is home to a general hospital (Ikot Okoro General Hospital), magistrate court, police station, and post office. At the height of Ikot Okoro's prosperity, traders called the Umannis from the east of Nigeria, notably those from Arochukwu in Abia State settled there. Present day Ikot Okoro has a high school / comprehensive secondary school and two primary schools. It is connected to the national grid and has effective telecommunication reception from any of the wireless telecommunication companies in Nigeria.
