= Anaang language =

Cross River language spoken in Nigeria

Anaang
- Native to: Nigeria
- Region: Akwa Ibom State
- Ethnicity: Anaang
- Native speakers: 2.9 million (2020)
- Language family: Niger–Congo?: Atlantic–Congo; Volta-Congo; Benue–Congo; Cross River; Lower Cross; Ibibio-Efik; Anaang

Language codes
- ISO 639-3: anw
- Glottolog: anaa1238
- ELP: Anaang

Anaang (Annang) is the native language of the Anaang people of Nigeria.

The Annang speaker of English tends to apply the grammatical rules of Annang in his use of English, often violating the intuition of native speakers of English.

Annang language is the identity of Agwo Annang(Annang person) which differentiate the annang people from other tribes in Akwa Ibom state.

Annang language which belongs to the Niger-Congo ethnolinguistic group is spoken by over 2.3 million Nigerians.

Annang language are spoken by these following community: Abak, Ikot Ekpene, Ika, Ukanfun, Etim Ekpo, Obot Akara etc. parts of the annang language may be intelligible to speakers of Efik, Ibibio,Oron, Ekit (also known as Ekid) of the old Calabar Kingdom. Though the annang speech pattern was not written down, linguist have now produced an orthography of the language which makes it possible to produce written materials in the language (Idem-Agozino & Udondata, 2001; Ette (2009) According to Ephraim Stephen Essien in his book "Annang Philosophy (2011).

== Phonology ==
=== Consonants ===
Anaang consonants
		Labial	Alveolar	Post-alv./ Palatal	Velar		Labio- velar	Uvular
		Labial	Alveolar	Post-alv./ Palatal	plain	lab.	Labio- velar	Uvular
Nasal		m	n	ɲ	ŋ	ŋʷ		
Plosive/ Affricate	voiceless	p	t	t͡ʃ	k	kʷ	k͡p	
Plosive/ Affricate	voiced	b	d	d͡ʒ		ɡʷ		
Fricative		f	s					ʁ
Rhotic			r					
Approximant		w	l	j				

- Consonants /p, b, t, d, k, k͡p, f, m, n, l, w/ may be heard as palatalized [ʲ] when occurring before /i/.
- /ʁ/ may also be heard as a trill [ʀ] when before a front vowel.
- /r/ may also be heard as a tap [ɾ].

=== Vowels ===
Anaang vowels
	Front	Central	Back
Close	i iː	ʉ ʉː	u uː
Close-mid	e eː		o oː
Open-mid			ɔ ɔː
Open		a aː	

== See also ==
- Anaang word list (Wiktionary)
