= Ukanafun =

- LGA
- Interactive map of Ukanafun
- Location in Nigeria
- Coordinates: 4°54′0″N 7°36′0″E
- Country: Nigeria
- State: Akwa Ibom State
- Capital: Ikot Akpa Nkuk

Government
  - Chairman: Israel Demas Ideh

Area
  - Total: 232.0 km^{2} (89.6 sq mi)

Population (2022)
  - Total: 160,100
  - Density: 690.1/km^{2} (1,787/sq mi)
- Time zone: UTC+1 (WAT)

UkanafunAudio is a Local Government Area located in the South South of Nigeria in Akwa Ibom State.

== History of Ukanafun ==
The original name of the present day Ukanafun was Akan Afono which the colonia masters could not pronounce and thereby replaced it by Ukanafun.

== Economy ==
Numerous individuals of Ukanafun LGA participate in exchange and trade, wood cutting, and specialty crafts and artisan products.
