= Abak =

- LGA and town
- Interactive map of Abak
- Location in Nigeria
- Coordinates: 4°59′N 7°47′E
- Country: Nigeria
- State: Akwa Ibom State
- Local Government Headquarter: Abak

Government
  - Chairman: Hon. Mrs. Ime Effiong Charles

Area
  - Total: 190 km^{2} (73 sq mi)
- Elevation: 0 m (0 ft)

Population (2006 census)
  - Total: 139,090
  - Density: 730/km^{2} (1,900/sq mi)
- Time zone: UTC+1 (WAT/CET)
- 3-digit postal code prefix: 532
- ISO 3166 code: NG.AK.AB

Abak (audio) is a town and Local Government Area in Akwa Ibom State, Nigeria. The LGA was previously part of Cross River State. It was later subdivided into other local government areas such as Oruk Anam, Etim Ekpo, Ukanafun and Ika. Notable tribes include the Annang. Abak consists of five clans: Abak Urban, Afaha Obong, Ediene, Midim and Otoro. The major economic activities of the people of this area before and after the Nigerian Civil War was palm produce exported through the river port at Ekpene Okpo, Ntak Ibesit, a distance of about 8 km from Abak town. Abak Town, the local government headquarters is located about 18 kilometres (11 miles) from Uyo, the state capital. It has a landmass of 190 square kilometres (73 square miles). Abak to say the least, is the shadow of its former self due to politically motivated neglect by successive governments in Akwa Ibom State. Abak was the economic hub of the former Southeastern Nigeria before the civil war. The Nigerian Army barrack that is popularly known as Ibagwa Barrack is located or can be found in Abak. The Ime Umana Campus of the University of Uyo which accommodates the Pre-Degree, JUPEB and other special courses, is located in Ediene-Abak, Abak.

The major economic activities of the people are palm production. Before the civil war, Abak Division was the major producer of palm oil and kernel exported through river ports at Ntak Ibesit and Ikot Okoro. Abak has natural resources which include, rich mineral deposits such as sand, gravel, clay, salt and crude oil (corked). It is situated in the tropical rain forest that supplies abundant palm produce, cassava and various vegetables.

== Climate ==
Abak, which is 0 metres (0 feet, 0 yards) above sea level, has a tropical monsoon climate (Am classification). The district's annual temperature is 28.5 °C (83.3 °F), which is -0.96% lower than the national average for Nigeria. Abak usually experiences 294.64 wet days per year, 342.88 millimetres or 13.5 inches of precipitation per year.

=== Cloud ===
In Abak, the average percentage of the sky covered by clouds experiences massive seasonal variation over the course of the year. The clearest month of the year in Abak is December, where on average the sky is clear, mostly clear, or partly cloudy 37% of the time. The cloudiest month of the year in Abak is April, where on average the sky is overcast or mostly cloudy 88% of the time.

== History ==
Abak became the seat of Government in 1902 after the war conquest of the British armed forces that invaded the valley lying between the Ediene and Abak Clans. The outcome of that victory penetration into the hinterland by the colonial soldiers and eventual installation of the government. Valley in the local language is called "Aba-ag" and fighting is "Anwan." By joining the two words "Aba-ag" and "Anwan" the name "Aba-ag Ikot Anwan" was given to the newly established entity. The seat of Government kept growing until 1957 and 1958 when it gained the status of Divisional Council Headquarters. At the establishment, the area included the present Ukanafun, Oruk Anam, Etim Ekpo, Ika and the present Abak. All the places mentioned here have been developed to become full-fledged local government areas.

At the end of the civil war, the South Eastern State Government was created and Abak became one of the Development Administrative Headquarters with the local government reforms of 1976, Abak became a full-fledged Local Government Area and has remained so till date.

== People ==
The people are generally from the Annang ethnic group. They are reputed for their resourcefulness and highly mobilized for economic development and political integration within the State and the Nigerian federation.

== Culture ==
Abak's rich cultural heritage is reflected through traditional dances such as Ekpe, Ekpo, Idiongitals, etc., though majority are of the Christian faith.

Despite the advent of Western civilization and religion, there are some cultural institutions that still exist, such as Ekpo, Ekpe, Idiong, Attat Utu-Ekpe, Nnabō. These were powerful instruments of traditional governance before they lost their relevance in the mid-nineteenth century with the arrival of European missionaries.

== Population ==
Males 73,578, females 65,512, for a total of 139,090 according to 2006 National Census.

== Tourism ==
Private area-driven cordiality foundations like inns, stops, gardens and clubs.

== Natural resources ==
The Abak people are blessed with natural resources as sand, gravel, clay, salt and crude oil (corked). it can be found at the tropical rain forest which provides palm produce, cassava and various vegetables for their people.

== Political Wards ==
Wards	Ward Centers
Midim 1	Customary Court, Ikot Eshiet
Midim 2	Pri. Sch., Ikot Imo Nto Obo
Otoro 1	CSS, Atai Otoro
Otoro 2	Govt., Pri. Sch., Ikot Obioko
Otoro 3	Sec. Com. Sch., Ikot Etukudo
Afaha Obong 1	St. Andrews Primary School, Eriam
Afaha Obong 2	Pri. Sch., Ikot Obong
Abak Urban 1	St. Mary’s Science College, Ediene Abak
Abak Urban 2	Village Hall, Ikot Udousung
Abak Urban 3	Primary Sch., Abak Usung Atai
Abak Urban 4	Bishop Clark’s Central Sch., Abak
Abak Urban 5	Annang People’s Sch., Utu Abak

== Education ==
Abak is home to several public secondary schools and a technical college. The main technical institution is the Government Technical College, Abak, a public technical college listed by the National Board for Technical Education as one of the technical colleges in Akwa Ibom State.

In 2016 the Niger Delta Development Commission disowned a contract said to be for renovation of classroom blocks at the college after the state government complained that roofs of four blocks were removed and work was abandoned. In May 2021 the Nigerian Content Development and Monitoring Board handed over ultramodern carpentry and furniture workshops it renovated and upgraded at the college to support Technical and Vocational Education and Training. In 2020 the college was the only school in Akwa Ibom State selected among 32 schools nationwide for a N385,000 grant from the Development Research and Projects Centre in collaboration with Open Society Foundations to support final year students preparing for NABTEB examinations.

== See Also ==
- Official website of the Akwa Ibom State Government.
- Akwa Ibom State Government
