= Etinan =

- Town and LGA
- Interactive map of Etinan
- Location in Nigeria
- Coordinates: 4°51′0″N 7°50′0″E
- Country: Nigeria
- State: Akwa-Ibom State

Government
  - Chairman: Hon. Cletus Ekpo

Area
  - Total: 157.2 km^{2} (60.7 sq mi)

Population (2022)
  - Total: 215,600
  - Density: 1,372/km^{2} (3,552/sq mi)
- Time zone: UTC+1 (WAT)

Etinan (audio) is a town located within the South South part of Nigeria and constitutes one of the Local Government Areas in the oil rich Akwa Ibom State. Known for its agricultural and arts craft products, the area forms one of the most peaceful locations in the West African State of Nigeria.

Etinan is also home to the famous Peacock Paints Industries and NIFOR zonal office.

Within Etinan LGA, is the village of Mbioto, home town of the former Akwa Ibom state governor Obong Akpan Isemin, the village of Ikot Udo Abia, which was part of the route of the African slave trade. Ekpene Obom is a village in Etinan where Leprosy Hospital, Nigeria is located.

Akwa Ibom State College Of Health Technology, is also located in Etinan.

== Historical background ==
Following the recommendations of the Akilu commission of Inquiry into the administrative structure of the then South Eastern State, Etinan Local Government was created in 1976 out of the former Uyo Division with Etinan as its headquarters.

== People and Culture ==
The area is mainly inhabited by the Iman Ibom people who are characteristically dynamic, imaginative, industrious and intelligent. They generally speak Ibibio language and have a rich cultural heritage. Some of the cultural societies found here are Ekpo, Ekong, Ebre and Idiong. A greater percentage of the people are Christians although some forms of African traditional religion are practiced by few people. Their culture is reflected and displayed through dances, arts, and crafts. The main occupation of the people centres around farming and petty trading. Crops cultivated include yams, cassava, cocoyam and maize. Small scale manufacturing is also carried out by the people. A number of the people also engage in palm-wine tapping, crafts-making, wood-carving, sculpture and baking.

== Geographical Location and Climate ==
Etinan Local Government Area is located on latitude 05001’N and longitude 07054’E. It is 26 kilometres (16 miles) south of Uyo, the Akwa Ibom State capital and 24 kilometres (15 miles) north of Eket. It shares common boundaries with Onna, Nsit Ibom, Mkpat Enin, Ibesikpo Asutan, Abak and Uyo Local Government Areas. The entire Local Government Area lies in the tropical rainforest belt and has two distinct seasons – the rainy season and the dry season. The vegetation is evergreen.

=== Cloud ===
In Etinan, the average percentage of the sky covered by clouds experiences significant seasonal variation over the course of the year. The clearest month of the year in Etinan is December, the cloudiest month is April.

== Natural Resources ==
There are large deposits of mineral resources such as clay, glass, sand and sharp sand. Agricultural resources include palm produce, cassava and yam.

== Commerce ==
Some of the most famous markets are Udua Etinan which is in the capital of the Etinan, Udua Mkpafi which is in Ikot Isong, along with other markets.

== Population ==
Population Figures
Male	Female
85, 760	83,164
Total	168,924

According to the National Population Commission of Nigeria in 2006.

== Political Wards ==
Wards	Ward Centers
Etinan Urban 1	Central School, Etinan
Etinan Urban 2	Primary School, Ekpene Ukpa
Etinan Urban 3	Primary School, Ikot Abasi
Etinan Urban 4	Primary School, Ekpene Obom
Etinan Urban 5	Primary School, Ikot Udobia
Southern Iman 1	Primary School, Awantong
Southern Iman 2	Primary School, Nkana
Southern Iman 3	Ikot Obio Eka
Southern Iman 4	Qua Iboe Church School, Efa
Southern Iman 5	Primary School, Mbioto Town School
Northern Iman 1	Primary School, Afaha Effiat
Northern Iman 2	Community Secondary School, Asuna
