= Executive Council of Akwa Ibom State =

Executive arm of a state government in Nigeria

The Akwa Ibom State Executive Council (also known as the Cabinet of Akwa Ibom State) is a governmental body that plays important roles in the Government of Akwa Ibom State headed by the Governor of Akwa Ibom State. It consists of the Deputy Governor, Secretary to the State Government, Chief of Staff to the Governor, Head of Civil Service, Deputy Chief of Staff, Commissioners who preside over ministerial departments, and the Governor's special aides.

== Functions ==
The Executive Council exists to advise and direct the Governor. Their appointment as members of the Executive Council gives them the authority to execute power over their fields.

== Current cabinet ==
The current Executive Council is serving under the Umo Bassey Eno administration.

Office	Incumbent
Governor	Umo Bassey Eno
Deputy Governor	Akon Eyakenyi
Secretary to the State Government	Prince Enobong Uwah
Head of Civil Service	Effiong Edem Essien
Commissioner of Justice and Attorney-General	Uko Udom, SAN
Commissioner of Agriculture	Offiong Offor
Commissioner of Finance	Nsikan Nkan
Commissioner of Works	Eno Ibanga
Commissioner of Education	Ubong Essien
Commissioner of Environment and Petroleum Resources	Uno Etim Uno
Commissioner of Transport	Orman Esin
Commissioner of Local Government & Chieftaincy Affairs	Frank Archibong
Commissioner of Information	Ini Ememobong
Commissioner of Lands and Water Resources	Iniobong Ekong
Commissioner of Health	Dominic Ukpong
Commissioner of Science and Technology	Imoh Moffat
Commissioner of Youth and Sports	Monday Uko
Commissioner of Housing	Otuekong Raphael Bassey
Commissioner of Economic Development	Emem Bob
Commissioner of Labour and Manpower Planning	
Commissioner of Trade and Investment	
Commissioner of Culture & Tourism	Anietie Udofia
Commissioner for Science and Digital Economy	Frank Ekpenyong
Commissioner of Special Duties	Okpolupm Etteh
Special Adviser, Bureau of Political and Legislative Affairs	Sunday Ekanem Ibuot
Special Adviser, Bureau of Rural Development and Cooperatives	Ekemini David Umoh
