= List of ministries, agencies and commissions in Akwa Ibom State =

List of government ministries, Nigeria

This is a list of the government ministries of Akwa Ibom State, Nigeria. Each ministry is headed by the commissioner, assisted by a Permanent Secretary.

== List of ministries and their commissioners ==
Ministries	Commissioner
Ministry of Special Duties and Ibom Deep Seaport	Bassey Okon
Ministry Of Culture and Tourism	Charles Udoh
Ministry of Justice, Attorney General	Uko Essien Udom
Ministry of Finance	Nsikan Linus Nkan
Ministry of Agriculture	Offiong Offor
Ministry of Women Affairs and Social Welfare	Ini Adiakpan
Ministry of Works and Fire Service	Eno James Ibanga
Ministry of Transport and Solid Minerals	Hon. Dr Anthony Luke Udoh
Ministry of Education	Idongesit Iboro Etiebet
Ministry of Power and Petroleum Development Welfare	Camilus Umoh
Ministry of Health	Augustine Vincent Umoh
Ministry of Lands and Water Resources	Iniobong Ekong
Ministry of Housing	Otuekong Raphael Bassey
Ministry of Environment	Uno Uno
Ministry of Information and Strategy	Ini Ememobong Essien
Ministry of Local Govt. and Chieftaincy Affairs	Frank Archibong
Ministry of Trade and Investment	John Etim
Ministry of Special Duties	Okpolupm Ikpong Etteh
Ministry of Labour and Manpower Planning	Aniefiok Nkom
Ministry of Science and Technology	Dr. Frank Ekpeyong
Ministry of Youths and Sports	Sir Monday Ebong Uko
Ministry of Rural Development and Cooperatives	Enobong Udemeabasi Mbobo
Ministry of Internal Security	Koko Essien
Ministry of Water Resources and Sanitation	Enobong Udemeabasi Mbobo
Bureau of Political and Social Re-orientation	Amanam Nkanga

== See also ==
- Akwa Ibom State
