= Akwa Ibom State Ministry of Housing and Urban Renewal =

Ministry in Akwa Ibom State, Nigeria

Akwa Ibom State Ministry Of Urban Renewal And Special Duties
Agency overview
- Jurisdiction: Government Of Akwa Ibom State, Nigeria
- Agency executive: Mr. Akan Okon
- Website: http://www.mhur.ak.gov.ng http://www.aksmhur.com

The Akwa Ibom State Ministry of Urban Renewal and Special Duties is the state government's ministry tasked with overseeing the housing and urban renewal sector in the state. They are also charged with the responsibility to plan, devise and implement the state policies on Housing.Their current headquarters is at Idongesit Nkanga Secretariat. Uyo. One of the Major projects handled by the ministry was the new Secretariat Annex recently commissioned by the Executive Gov. Udom Emmanuel.

== Leadership ==
The current commissioner is Prince Enobong Uwah The Commissioner is in charge of overseeing the daily activities of the Ministry.

== See also ==
- Akwa Ibom State Ministry of Education
