= Uwemedimo Nwoko =

Akwa Ibom State Ministry of Justice
- In office January 2015 – January 2021
- Preceded by: Barr. Ekpenyong Ntekim
- Succeeded by: Mr. Uko Essien Udom

Personal details
- Born: 27 October 1964 (age 61) Abiakana, Ika, Akwa Ibom State, Nigeria
- Party: People's Democratic Party (Nigeria)
- Education: University of Calabar

Uwemedimo Nwoko (born 27 October 1964) is a Nigerian legal practitioner, politician, human rights activist and the past Attorney-General and Commissioner for Justice in Akwa Ibom State.

== Early life and education ==
Nwoko was born on 27 October 1964 in Abiakana, in Ika Local Government Area of Akwa Ibom State.

In 1972, Nwoko started attending Qua Iboe Church (QIC) Group School, Ikot Osukpong, Ika LGA of Akwa Ibom State and left the school in 1977 to continue his secondary education at Saint Augustine Secondary School, Urua Inyang (1977–1982). He later proceeded to study law at the University of Calabar (1987–1991) before completing the course at the Nigerian Law School, Victoria Island, Lagos (1991–1992).

== Career ==
In December 2014, incumbent governor of Akwa Ibom State, Chief Godswill Akpabio forwarded Nwoko's name to the Akwa Ibom State House of Assembly for screening and eventual appointment as the state's Attorney-General and Commissioner for Justice.

On 13 January 2015, he was given the job. He became the 14th Attorney-General and Commissioner for Justice of Akwa Ibom State.

In mid-2015, he was re-appointed the state's Attorney-General and Commissioner for Justice by the incumbent governor, Governor Udom Gabriel Emmanuel.
