= Ekaette =

- Gender: Female
- Language: Efik

Origin
- Word/name: Nigeria
- Meaning: Father's Mom

Ekaette is a surname. Notable people with the surname include:

- Angela Ekaette, Nigerian ballet dancer
- Ufot Ekaette (born 1939), Nigerian government official
- Eme Ufot Ekaette (born 1945), Nigerian politician
