= Effiong Essien =

Nigerian civil servant

Elder Effiong Edem Essien is a Nigerian civil servant , a Geologist and the former head of civil service in Akwa Ibom State Nigeria .He was appointed by Governor Udom Emmanuel on the 3rd of June 2019.

== Early life and family ==
Effiong Essien is from Afaha Atai Ibesikpo in Ibesikpo-Asutan Local Government Area of Akwa Ibom State. He is a father and husband to Uduak Effiong Essien.

== Academic career ==
Elder Essien holds a Master's degree in Public Administration and has completed leadership training programs both locally and internationally.
