= Charles Udoh =

Nigerian politician

Delivery Advisor on Tourism
- Incumbent
- Assumed office March 4, 2025
- Governor: Umo Eno

Commissioner for Culture and Tourism
- In office July 2023 – February 2025
- Governor: Umo Eno
- Succeeded by: Anietie Udofia

Commissioner for Information and Strategy
- In office December 1, 2016 – 2020
- Governor: Udom Emmanuel

Personal details
- Spouse: Regina Charles Udoh

Charles Udoh is a Nigerian politician who served as Commissioner for Culture and Tourism in Akwa Ibom State, Nigeria starting in July 2023. He was succeeded by Anietie Udofia on February 2025. On December 1, 2016, he was appointed the Commissioner for Information and Strategy by Governor Udom Emmanuel. He is currently the Delivery Advisor on Tourism to Governor Umo Eno.

== Personal life ==
Charles Udoh attended Diamond Hill Primary School, Calabar and then West African Peoples' Institute, Calabar before moving to Akwa Ibom State to attend the School of Art and Science. Subsequently, he got his first degree at the University of Uyo. Udoh got married in 1998. The marriage has produced children. On July 25, 2018, he celebrated his 20th marriage anniversary in Akwa Ibom State.

== Career ==
Udoh began his career as a trainer and consultant at the Financial Institutions Training Center (FITC), Lagos, Nigeria. In 2003, he got a job at First Bank of Nigeria and was in charge of the company's brand department. In 2006, he was offered a job at Guaranty Trust Bank as the company's group brand manager and head of corporate communications. In 2008, he was recruited by KPMG Professional Services and given the position of group head, corporate communications for Diamond Bank. He is also the founder of Adam & Agnes Limited, a brand, marketing and communication agency. Until his appointment on 1 December 2016, Udoh was the Head of Brand and Marketing Communications at Wema Bank.

== Awards and honours ==
In 2018, Udoh was honoured with the investiture of an induction as an Honorary Fellow of the Institute of Information Management by the Institute of Information Management, Nigeria. Again, In 2018, he was conferred with the Mental Health Ambassador Award by the organizers of the "Sacrificial Lamb" Arts Exhibition held in 2018 at the National Art Gallery, Uyo for his contributions towards the successful hosting of the event. He received Africa's Distinguished Personality Award by Trans-Africa Students Initiative in 2018.
