= Ufot =

Ufot may refer to:

== People ==
- Ufot Ekaette (born 1939), Nigerian politician
- Eme Ufot Ekaette (born 1945), Nigerian politician
- Dorothy Ufot, Nigerian lawyer
- Nsé Ufot, Nigerian activist

== Other uses ==
- Esin Ufot, community in Nigeria
