= Ekem John =

Nigerian politician and medical doctor

Ekem Emmanuel John

Commissioner for Health, Akwa Ibom State
- Incumbent
- Assumed office February 2025
- Appointed by: Umo Eno

Personal details
- Occupation: Medical doctor, Politician

Ekem Emmanuel John is a Nigerian politician, medical doctor and public administrator who serves as the Commissioners of Akwa Ibom State in Akwa Ibom State. He was appointed into the State Executive Council in February 2025.

== Career ==
Before his appointment as Commissioner for Health, John worked as a medical doctor in Akwa Ibom State.

Ekem assumed office as Commissioner for Health in February 2025 following his swearing-in by Governor Umo Eno.

== Philanthropy ==
John is the founder of the Ekem Emmanuel John Foundation, an academic support grant programme for students in Oruk Anam, Akwa Ibom State.

== See also ==
- Akwa Ibom State Ministry of Health
- Executive Council of Akwa Ibom State
