= Abubakar Momoh =

Nigerian politician

Minister of Niger Delta Affairs
- Incumbent
- Assumed office 27 October 2023
- President: Bola Tinubu
- Preceded by: Umana Okon Umana

Personal details
- Born: November 1959 (age 66) Imiegba. Edo, Nigeria
- Profession: Politician and engineer

Abubakar Momoh is a Nigerian politician and engineer. He was appointed minister of the Niger Delta Development Commission by President Bola Ahmed Tinubu. He was a former legislator of the Edo State House of Assembly and a former legislator of the House of Representatives for Etsako Federal Constituency, in Edo State

== Early life and education ==
Abubakar was born in November 1959. He hails from Imiegba, a community in North Ibie, situated in Etsako East Local Government Area of Edo. He holds a Bachelor of Engineering degree from the University of Benin and a Master’s degree in Public Administration from Edo State University. He is a Nigeria fellow of the Institute of Public Administration (FPA) and a registered member of the Nigerian Society of Engineers and the Council for the Regulation of Engineering in Nigeria (COREN).

== Political career ==
Abubakar Momoh started his political career as a councilor to a local government chairman. In 1999 -2003 he served as a legislator in the Edo State House of Assembly before going to the federal to serve in Etsako Federal Constituency between 2003 and 2007. He was also elected for the second time into the House of Representatives between 2011 and 2015. He changed his party in 2019 to contest under the Peoples Democratic Party (PDP) for the Edo North Senatorial seat but lost the election. He later went back to his party The All Progressives Congress (APC). In 2023, President Bola Ahmed Tinubu appointed Abubakar Momoh as the Minister for Niger Delta Development.

== Personal life ==
He is married with 2 children.
