= Akwa Ibom State Ministry of Health =

Ministry in Akwa Ibom State, Nigeria

Agency overview
- Formed: 1987
- Jurisdiction: Government of Akwa Ibom State
- Headquarters: Idongesit Nkanga Secretariat
- Agency executives: Dr Ekem Emmanuel John, Commissioner; Dr Patrick Essiet, Permanent Secretary

The Akwa Ibom State Ministry of Health is the state government ministry, charged with the responsibility to plan, devise and implement the state policies on Health. The ministry was formed as an MDA (Ministries, Departments, and Agencies), in 1987, with the creation of the Nigerian state of Akwa Ibom. Its current headquarters is at the Idongesit Nkanga Secretariat, Uyo.

== Leadership ==
The Commissioner is in charge of overseeing the daily activities of the Ministry. The current commissioner of health appointed by Governor Umo Eno in 2025 is Dr Ekem Emmanuel John.

The Permanent Secretary supports the general policies and priorities of the government which operates within the context of the management practices and procedures created for the government as a whole.

== Directorate ==
The ministry has various directorates serving its purpose. They include:

- Directorate of Administration/Supplies
- Directorate of Nursing services
- Directorate of Medical Services
- Directorate of Pharmaceutical Services
- Directorate of Public Health Services
- Directorate of Planning, Research, and Statistics
- Directorate of Accounts and Finance

== Parastatals ==
- Akwa Ibom State Hospital Management Board
- Institutions
  - Akwa Ibom State College of Health Technology, Etinan
  - College of Nursing Sciences, Ikot Ekpene
  - School of Midwifery, Ituk Mbang
- Akwa Ibom State Primary Health Care Development Agency
