= Offor =

Offor is a surname in the English and Igbo languages, Common amongst the Igbo and their diaspora, the surname in their language symbolizes sacred authority, justice, and truth. The British variant is likely a place name, believed to be derived from the Old English over, referring to a ridge, bank, or high location.

Notable people with the surname Offor include:

- Beatrice Offor (1864–1920), English painter
- Chinonso Offor (born 2000), Nigerian soccer player
- Emeka Offor (born 1959), Nigerian oil magnate and engineer
- George Offor (1787–1864), English book collector
- Offiong Offor, Nigerian politician and academic
- Paul Offor (born 1988), Nigerian soccer manager
