= Akwa Ibom State Ministry of Works =

Ministry in Akwa Ibom State, Nigeria

Agency overview
- Jurisdiction: Government of Akwa Ibom State
- Headquarters: State Government Secretariat Annex, Uyo
- Agency executives: Mr. Ephraim Akparawa Inyangeyen, Commissioner; Elder. Effiong Essien, Permanent Secretary

The Akwa Ibom State Ministry of Works is the state government ministry charged with the responsibility of planning, devising, and implementing state policies on public works.
