= Akwa Ibom State Ministry of Transport and Petroleum =

Ministry in Akwa Ibom State, Nigeria

Agency overview
- Jurisdiction: Government of Akwa Ibom State
- Headquarters: Idongesit Nkanga Secretariat
- Agency executive: Orman Esin, Commissioner

The Akwa Ibom State Ministry of Transport and Petroleum is the Nigerian state government ministry charged with the responsibility to plan, devise, and implement state policies on transportation and petroleum.
