= Anietie =

AnietieAudio is a Nigerian unisex name of Ibibio origin which means "who is like God". It is a diminutive version of the name "Anietie-NteAbasi" which means"who is like God".

== Notable people with the name ==
- Anietie Isong, Nigerian author of poetry and short stories.
- Anietie Udofia (born 1986),Nigerian public administrator and politician.
- Anietie Robert (born 1990), Nigerian Celebrity Photographer
