= Imoh (name) =

Origin
- Language: Ibibio
- Origin: Nigeria
- Meaning: Wealth or riches
- Region of origin: South-south Nigeria

ImohAudio is a Nigerian given name and a surname of Ibibio and Annang origin which means "wealth" or "riches". Notable people with the name include:

== Given name ==
- Imoh Ezekiel (born 1993), Nigerian footballer
- Imoh Umoren (born 1982), Nigerian Filmmaker
- Imoh Moffat (born 1968), Nigerian Statistician and politician

== Surname ==
- Chidi Imoh (born 1965), Nigerian sprinter
- Mike Imoh (born 1984), American gridiron football player
