= Godwin Akpan Amaowoh =

Nigerian clergyman and researcher

- Born: Godwin Akpan Amaowoh; 29 November 1959 (age 66); Akwa Ibom State
- Occupations: clergy, researcher and inventor
- Known for: Tupocracy

Dr. Godwin Akpan Amaowoh (born November 29, 1959) is a clergyman, researcher and inventor of Tupocracy. He currently serves as the General Secretary and Trustee of the Assemblies of God.

Godwin is an awardee of Nigerian Books of Record. In 2023, he was appointed by governor Umo Eno into Christian Leaders Advisory Council of the Executive Council of Akwa Ibom State.

His ideas and achievements played a role in Akwa Ibom's increasing recognition both national and global scene.

== Early life and education ==
Dr. Godwin Akpan Amaowoh was born in Mbiabong Ikon No 1, Ikono Local Government Area of Akwa Ibom State.He obtained a National Certificate in Education (NCE) in Geography and History from the College of Education, Uyo, before earning a Diploma in Theology from the Assemblies of God Theological Seminary, Uyo. He later completed a Bachelor of Arts in Biblical Studies from the Assemblies of God Divinity School, a master's degree in Religious Studies (New Testament) from the University of Uyo, and a PhD in Religious Studies from the University of Nigeria, Nsukka.

== Teaching and advocacy career ==
Godwin Akpan Amaowoh is the proprietor of Kay Kay Dignity International Academy in Ikot Ekpene but started his career at Federal Ministry of Education (Nigeria), Cross River State, where he worked as a clerical officer from 1979 to 1980 before transitioning to teaching roles in secondary schools during his National Youth Service Corps (NYSC) year.

He is an advocates for educational curriculum that incorporates local values, traditions and preservation of Regional language and indigenous languages.

He is also an advocate for ethical political landscape by embodying the principles of Tupocracy in their leadership practices. And for religious institutions to contribute to national development within the church and academic pursuits.

Amaowoh published works are on intersection of faith, culture, and identity and challenges posed by globalization.

== Professional bodies ==
- Biblical Research Forum of Nigeria (BRESFON)
- Association of Private School Owners, Akwa Ibom State.
- Member, Board of Trustees, Old Students Association, Ikono People's High School, Nung Ukim, Akwa Ibom State.
- Member, Advisory Board, Fathers in Faith for Good Governance, Akwa Ibom State.
- Member, Board of Trustees of Assemblies of God

== Books ==
- Tupocracy: Leadership by example for the Church and Civil society
- An understanding of Tupos in Pauline Letters on the Pastoral Ministry of the Church and its implication for Contemporary society’
- The Role of Tupocracy in National Development: The Nigerian Perspective

== Award and recognition ==
- Nigerian Books of Record
- Excellent Service Award – Akwa Ibom Youth Federation, 2012.
- South –South Public Officer Man of Honour Award - Nation Wide Publisher Award Initiative, 2015.

== Personal life ==
Dr. Amaowoh is married to Rev Mrs. Comfort Godwin Amaowoh, a retired Chief Health Educator.
