= Uko Udom =

Nigeria Politician

Uko Essien Udom, SAN is a Nigerian politician, and a legal practitioner. He is the attorney general and the commissioner for justice of Akwa Ibom State.

== Early life and education ==
Uko was born on 11 April 1956, in Ibadan, in Oyo state. He went to Abadina school, Ibadan, from 1962 to 1966 for his primary School education. He went to the International School, Ibadan, Oyo State, for his secondary school education. He also attended Holy Family College Abak, Akwa Ibom State, where he wrote and obtained his West African School Certificate in 1972. He holds aDiploma in Company Administration, a Bachelor of Arts degree in law from the Manchester Metropolitan University, Manchester, England.

== Political career ==
Uko served under the leadership of His Excellency, Obong Victor Attah, in the preparation of the Memorandum of Akwa Ibom State to the National Constitutional Conference in 1994/1995.

He was Appointed the commissioner for justice in Akwa Ibom State by Governor Udom Emmanuel on 4 January 2021. He was reappointed as the commissioner for justice by Governor Umo Bassey Eno the current governor of Akwa Ibom State in February 2025.
