= Akwa Ibom State Ministry of Agricultural Resources =

Ministry in Akwa Ibom State, Nigeria

Agency overview
- Jurisdiction: Government of Akwa Ibom State
- Headquarters: Idongesit Nkanga Secretariat
- Agency executive: Dr. Glory Edet, Commissioner

The Akwa Ibom State Ministry of Agricultural Resources is the state government ministry, charged with the responsibility to plan, devise and implement the state policies on Agricultural Resources. it is located at Block 1 (Ground 2nd & 3rd Floors), Idongesit Nkanga Secretariat Complex, Uyo
