= Dominic Ukpong =

Nigerian politician

Dominic Ukpong is a Nigerian politician who served as a commissioner for health in Akwa Ibom State. He was appointed by Governor Udom Emmanuel.

In 2019, he was nominated as a special adviser by Governor Udom Emmanuel.

Ukpong was reappointed as an honorary special adviser on health matters following his redeployment as a Commissioner for health in August 2020.
