= Enobong Uwah =

Nigerian civil servant

Prince Enobong Emmanuel Uwah is a Nigerian civil servant who is serving as the secretary to the state government (SSG) of Akwa Ibom since 2023. Uwah previously served commissioner of Housing and Urban Renewal.

== Early life and education ==
Enobong Uwah was born on 15 January 1969 in Atan Offot, Uyo, Akwa Ibom.

Uwah obtained a First School Leaving Certificate from Ikot Offiong Mbai Primary School in Cross River State from 1974 to 1979 and his West African Senior Schools Certificate from Federal Government College, Ikot Ekpene in 1984.

Uwah graduated with a bachelor's degree in geography and regional planning from University of Uyo (UNIUYO) from 1985 to 1989, and a master's degree in public administration in 2011.

== Career ==
In 2007, Godswill Akpabio appointed Uwah as a special assistant to the governor and was later appointed as the commissioner of Ministry of Environment and Mineral Resources. In 2015 during the governorship of Udom Emmanuel, he was appointed as the commissioner of housing and urban renewal. As of 2023, Uwah has been serving as the secretary to the state government of Akwa Ibom State.
