= Akwa Ibom State Ministry of Information and Strategy =

Ministry in Akwa Ibom State, Nigeria

Agency overview
- Jurisdiction: Government of Akwa Ibom State
- Headquarters: Idongesit Nkanga Secretariat
- Agency executive: Ini Ememobong - immediate past-, Commissioner

The Akwa Ibom State Ministry of Information and Strategy is the state government's ministry, charged with the responsibility to plan, devise and implement the state policies on Information and Strategy. Its current headquarters is at the Idongesit Nkanga Secretariat, Uyo.

== History ==
The Akwa Ibom State Ministry of Information and Strategy was established in September 1987, with Mr Moses Ekpo as its Pioneer Commissioner. Mr Moses Ekpo was the former Deputy Governor of Akwa Ibom State under the Governor Udom Emmanuel administration.

== Leadership ==
The Commissioner is in charge of overseeing the daily activities of the Ministry. The current commissioner of Information appointed by Governor Umo Eno in 2025 is Aniekan Umanah.
