= Ekaette Francesca Fabian-Obot =

Nigerian jurist

Chief Judge of Akwa Ibom State
- Incumbent
- Assumed office 5 October 2021
- Governor: Udom Emmanuel

Personal details
- Born: January 7, 1963 (age 63) Lagos State, Nigeria
- Education: Obafemi Awolowo University (LL.B)

Ekaette Francesca Fabian-Obot (born 7 January 1963) is a Nigerian jurist who currently serves as the Chief Judge of Akwa Ibom State.

== Early life and education ==
Ekaette Francesca Fabian-Obot was born on 7 January 1963 in Lagos State, Nigeria. She had her primary and secondary education in Lagos before proceeding to the University of Ife, where she obtained her Bachelor of Laws (LL.B) degree in 1984. She was called to the Nigerian Bar in 1985.

== Career ==
=== Early legal career ===
Francesca's legal career started at the Federal Ministry of Justice, Marina, Lagos, where she served for the mandatory National Youth Service Corps (NYSC) programme.

=== Magistracy and High Court ===
She joined the Akwa Ibom State Judiciary as a Magistrate Grade II and rose through the ranks of the magistracy. She was sworn in as a Judge of the High Court of Akwa Ibom State on 3 July 2000.

=== Chief Judge of Akwa Ibom State ===
Following the retirement of the former Chief Judge, Justice Godwin Abraham, Justice Francesca was sworn in as the Acting Chief Judge on 30 June 2021. She was sworn in as the 8th Chief Judge of Akwa Ibom State by Governor Udom Emmanuel on 5 October 2021. She was the third woman to become Chief Judge at Akwa Ibom. As Chief Judge, Francesca established a monitoring committee for the administration of criminal justice in Akwa Ibom.
