= 2015 Akwa Ibom State gubernatorial election =

2015 gubernatorial election in Akwa Ibom State, Nigeria

- April 11, 2015
Nominee	Udom Gabriel Emmanuel	Umana Umana
Party	PDP	APC
Running mate	Moses Ekpo	Ben Ukpong
Popular vote	996,071	89,865
Governor before election
Godswill Akpabio
APC
Elected Governor
Udom Gabriel Emmanuel
PDP

The 2015 Akwa Ibom State gubernatorial election occurred in Nigeria on April 11, 2015, the PDP nominee Udom Gabriel Emmanuel won the election, defeating Umana Umana of the APC.

Udom Gabriel Emmanuel emerged PDP gubernatorial candidate after scoring 1,201 votes and defeating his closest rival, Okpolupm Etteh, who received 38 votes. He picked Moses Ekpo as his running mate. Umana Umana was the PDP candidate with Ben Ukpong as his running mate. 14 candidates contested in the election.

== Electoral system ==
The Governor of Akwa Ibom State is elected using the plurality voting system.

== Primary election ==
=== PDP primary ===
The PDP primary election was held on December 8, 2014. Udom Gabriel Emmanuel won the primary election polling 1,201 votes against 22 other candidates. His closest rival was Okpolupm Etteh, who came second with 38 votes, Helen Esuene scored 12 votes, Effiong Abia scored 4 votes, Nsima Ekere scored 4 votes, while scored 2 votes, while Benjamin Okoko and Isangedighi Jerome got 1 votes each.

=== APC primary ===
The APC primary election was held on December 4, 2014. Umana Umana emerged APC flag bearer after defeating Sam Ewang, Emmanuel Ekpenyong and John James Akpanudoedeghe.

== Results ==
A total number of 14 candidates registered with the Independent National Electoral Commission to contest in the election.

The total number of registered voters in the state was 1,548,531, while 1,158,624 voters were accredited. Total number of votes cast was 1,122,836, while number of valid votes was 1,110,580. Rejected votes were 12,256.

Candidate	Party	Votes	%
Udom Gabriel Emmanuel	People's Democratic Party	996,071	89.69
Umana Umana	All Progressives Congress	89,865	8.09
Other candidates		24,644	2.22
Total		1,110,580	100.00
Valid votes		1,110,580	98.91
Invalid/blank votes		12,256	1.09
Total votes		1,122,836	100.00
Registered voters/turnout		1,548,531	72.51
Source: The Nation
