= Kwa River =

Kwa River may refer to

- Kwa Ibo River, which runs through Abia State and Akwa Ibom State, Nigeria
- Great Kwa River, in Cross River State, Nigeria
- Kwa River (Kasai), the short stretch of the Kasai River from the inflow of the Fimi to the Congo
- Kwa Kwa River, which connects the Sanaga River to the Wouri Estuary in Cameroon
