= Akwa Ibom State Ministry of Finance =

Ministry in Akwa Ibom State, Nigeria

Agency overview
- Jurisdiction: Government of Akwa Ibom State
- Headquarters: Idongesit Nkanga Secretariat
- Agency executive: Mr.Linus Nkan, Commissioner

The Akwa Ibom State Ministry of Finance is the state government ministry, charged with the responsibility to plan, devise and implement the Akwa Ibom State policies on finance. The Akwa Ibom state ministry of finance is located at Block 6, Idongesit Ikanga Secretariat Complex, Abak road, Uyo, Akwa ibom.

== Leadership ==
The Commissioner is in charge of overseeing the daily activities of the Ministry. The current Commissioner for finance in Akwa Ibom state is Emem Bob who was appointed by Umo Eno in February 25, 2025.

== See also ==
- Akwa Ibom State Ministry of Justice
