= Umana Okon Umana =

Nigerian politician (born 1959)

Umana Okon Umana CON is a Nigerian politician, economist, and business leader. He served as Nigeria's Minister of Niger Delta Affairs from July 2022 to April 2023.

== Early life and education ==
Umana was born on August 20th, 1959 in Calabar, Cross River State. He attended St. Patrick's College for his secondary education before earning a Bachelor Degree of Science in Economics from the University of Calabar in 1980. In 1987, he completed an MBA in Finance from the University of Port Harcourt.

== Civil service career ==
Umana began his career in public service in Akwa Ibom State. From 2000 until 2003, he served as the first permanent secretary of the Akwa Ibom State Budget Office. Following this role, until 2007, Umana served two terms under Governor Victor Attah, focusing on fiscal policy and state-level financial management as Commissioner for Finance.

== Political career ==
Under Governor Godswill Akpabio, Umana served as Secretary to the Government of Akwa Ibom State from 2007-2013 and coordinated government operations and policy implementation as the Secretary to the State Government.

In 2015, Umana contested as the gubernatorial candidate for Akwa Ibom State under the All Progressives Congress (APC). He garnered 89,865 votes, losing to Udom Emmanuel of the People's Democratic Party with 999,071 votes. Umana served as deputy director of logistics in the 2019 APC Presidential Campaign.

Umana was appointed Managing Director/CEO of the Oil and Gas Free Zones Authority (OGFZA) by President Muhammadu Buhari in July 2022. During his tenure, he prioritized infrastructure rehabilitation, socio-economic development, and community empowerment in the Niger Delta region. He was recognized as the "Minister of the Year" in 2022.

He was conferred the award of Commander of the Order of the Niger (CON) by President Muhammadu Buhari in 2023.
