= British Bible monopolies campaigns =

In the 19th century, in the period roughly 1820 to 1860, there were repeated Bible monopolies campaigns in the United Kingdom. They were aimed at removing monopolies, in the form of patents awarded to the King's Printers for England and Wales and for Scotland, respectively, in the publication of the Authorized Version of the Bible in English. These monopolies were not absolute, since they were shared with other institutions, and might not apply to Bibles with value added by illustrations, or annotations. But they were a barrier to cheap publishing of Bibles in large editions.

The Bible monopoly was a contentious issue from its start, with the bookseller Michael Sparke set against the first King's Printer, Robert Barker.

In Scotland, the monopoly was stricter, and a combination of local factors led to an intense campaign in the 1830s. At the end of the decade the patent granting a monopoly to the King's Printer for Scotland was not renewed. In England and Wales, despite campaigns for another decade, the monopoly remained.

== The "Bible privilege" and the privileged presses, to 1800 ==
For about two centuries it was understood that the privileged presses—the Oxford and Cambridge university presses—enjoyed a privilege in the printing of the Authorized Version of the Bible in English, that they shared with the King's Printer in England. It was a monopoly restriction, rather than a copyright matter, copyright law only developing slowly over the 17th and 18th centuries. It applied also to a wider group of publications, and it had implications for the distribution of Bibles in England. Since the university presses were not initially set up as profit-oriented enterprises, over much of that time they farmed out their rights to commercial printers. By about 1800 the position had changed, with the loss of the American colonies, the rise of evangelical movements in Christianity in the British Isles, and incipient technical innovation in printing.

=== Background from the 18th century ===
In Great Britain of the 18th century, the Bible monopolists were the English universities (Cambridge and Oxford, as privileged presses), and the royal printers, English and Scottish. Following advice from William Laud after their Great Charter of 1636, Oxford over a long period took non-competition payments from the Stationers' Company, in relation with other monopolies, and invested in building up a scholarly press.

A royal order of 1724 addressed the contemporary issues of cheaply-printed Bibles with many errors, that were also expensive, in particular requiring the wholesale price to be printed in the book. The reasons given for the monopoly, typically, were to ensure the integrity of the text, and to keep prices down. The era of John Baskett as King's Printer for England, during the 18th century, cast doubt on those advantages. The test case Millar v Taylor of 1769 was considered to have limited exclusive rights granted by crown patent: to "Bibles, Testaments, Prayer-books, acts of parliament, proclamations, acts of state, almanacks, and the Latin grammar."

The printer Thomas Carnan challenged the monopoly then held by the Stationers' Company to publish almanacs, and was successful in a court case of 1775. He failed, however, in a subsequent attempt to undermine the monopoly rights of the King's Printer in England, at that point Eyre & Strachan. An Irish equity case of 1794, Grierson v Jackson, before John FitzGibbon, 1st Earl of Clare as Lord Chancellor of Ireland, saw Lord Clare refuse to rule in a Bible printing case under letters patent.

The Society for the Promotion of Christian Knowledge was active in distributing cheap religious literature, including Bibles "for the poor", and gave Bibles away. Its operations created an association between Bibles in smaller formats (octavo downwards) and charity.

=== Loopholes in the monopoly ===
The Family Bible is a British publishing genre from the mid-18th century onwards (as well as a class of heirloom). By including annotations or illustrations, printers could avoid the monopoly restrictions. There were numerous editions in this style, and they were frequently produced by part publishing. The Complete Family Bible published by Francis Fawkes (part published 1761–2, sold in the provinces rather than London, illustrated with engravings) was influential.

A Bible commentary could contain the entire Bible text, as did The Illustration of the Holy Bible (from 1769, 3 vols.) by Robert Goadby. Another way around the monopoly was the polyglot Bible, and it was exploited by Samuel Bagster the Elder from 1816. The bookseller George Offor, in evidence to a parliamentary committee, pointed out that the customary loophole of permitting annotated Bibles had been closed by the wording of a renewed monopoly patent.

== British and Foreign Bible Society ==
The British and Foreign Bible Society (BFBS) was founded in 1804, to promote the distribution of Bibles, as an offshoot of the Religious Tract Society of 1798. The impetus was largely from the Evangelical Revival. It first had Bibles printed by the Cambridge University Press, in 1805; it then turned to the Oxford press and the King's Printers, by 1809. The BFBS set up a network of auxiliary local societies, which supplied Bibles at cost price; under a system set up by the merchant Charles Stokes Dudley and the lawyer Richard Phillips, it contributed greatly to the financial strength of the Society. In 1810 it ordered 10,000 Bibles in nonpareil (6 point) type from the Oxford press, and in 1812 was ordering from the King's Printer for England. In 1811 a duodecimo nonpareil Bible could be had for 4 s. The BFBS became the largest customer of the privileged presses in England.

George Browne's 1859 institutional history of the BFBS emphasised that it was not a campaigning organisation, and in particular concentrated on the supply of Bibles, rather than lobbying against the monopoly. This position was defended by Lord Teignmouth, Claudius Buchanan and John Owen, Browne's predecessor as a BFBS secretary. David Thompson in the New Cambridge History of the Bible concludes that the BFBS succeeded under the monopolies in bringing down the cost of Bibles, by pragmatic exploitation of the status quo in the first half of the 19th century, including importation of Bibles. It reduced the profit margins of the privileged presses. But this result was "at the expense of entrenching bible production in a standard cheap format".

== Scottish campaigns ==
In 1823, Sir David Hunter-Blair, 3rd Baronet, King's Printer for Scotland, successfully brought a legal case to prevent the import of Bibles from England into Scotland. An appeal was made, reaching the House of Lords in 1828, by George Buchan of Kelloe (1775–1856) representing Scottish Bible societies; he was a leading lay evangelical.

During the Apocrypha Controversy of the 1820s, the Edinburgh and Glasgow auxiliaries broke away formally from the BFBS in 1826, followed by other Scottish branches. A secondary monopoly-related issue, but one important in the Scottish context, was the refusal of the BFBS to print a metrical psalter with its Bibles, the content being not from the Authorized Version, but translation that was a Stationer's Company monopoly. After the Scottish Bible societies split from the BFBS, they had for a period no easy access to cheap imported Bibles, and that was a factor in the 1839 abolition of the Scottish Bible monopoly as it stood.

One of Hunter's principal opponents was John Lee, who in 1824 published Memorial for the Bible Societies in Scotland. In his Additional Memorial of 1826 Lee stated that the legal costs of the defence of the Scottish monopoly were being borne by the holders of the English Bible monopoly; and that the latter would be the major beneficiaries of the restriction of trade. At this time the King's Printer for England, holder of the monopoly, was John Reeves (died 1829), appointed in 1800 by William Pitt the younger, in association with the firm Eyre & Strahan.

A parliamentary committee was set up, chaired by John Archibald Murray, the Lord Advocate, in 1835, with remit restricted to the Scottish monopoly. There were hearings in 1837. William Ellis, a solicitor of the Scottish Supreme Court, gave evidence on behalf of the Edinburgh Bible Society, relating to their Bible imports in 1821 and Scottish feeling. Joseph Parker (died 1850), associated as a wholesale distributor to the Clarendon Press's Bible trade under the English monopoly, testified that two-thirds of the business was with Bible societies. Adam Thomson of Coldstream gave evidence, and ran a wide-reaching campaign, against renewal of the patent. It was ultimately successful, and the patent was allowed to lapse. From 1839, therefore, the legal position for Bibles in Scotland was reversed, with imports allowed, and the monopoly for printing them removed. John Eadie wrote that the 1839 abolition of the Scottish monopoly halved the price of Bibles directly.

== Radicals and patronage ==
The presses of the University of Oxford and University of Cambridge drew profits from the Bible monopoly; and this made it a target in the Radicals' campaign against "Old Corruption". William Cobbett argued that John Reeves had been given a lucrative sinecure when he was appointed (jointly) King's Printer.

The situation in Scotland, where the monopoly came to the Hunter Blair family, was that the grant had been political patronage given by Henry Dundas to James Hunter Blair, who became the 1st Baronet in 1786 and died in 1787. Dundas was a Tory political manager, holding sway in Scotland. James Hunter Blair's death meant that the monopoly would pass to the next generation. Either by initial design or as an afterthought, the grant was jointly with John Bruce, tutor to Dundas's son, from 1811 Robert Dundas, 2nd Viscount Melville.

== Accuracy issue ==
A sub-committee of the London Committee of nonconformist ministers, comprising James Bennett, Francis Augustus Cox and Ebenezer Henderson, was set up in 1830 to look into the Bible monopoly. The Baptist minister Thomas Curtis (c.1787–c.1860, from 1833 in the United States), of the London Committee, in 1833 published a pamphlet, querying the accuracy, and the adherence to the 1724 requirements, of the Bible texts printed by the university presses. It included a list of typographical errors "in and since" Benjamin Blayney's 18th century edition. It also attacked Andrew Spottiswoode, King's Printer for England, for inaccurate printing of Bible text. The sub-committee in March 1833 published a disclaimer, dissociating themselves from Curtis's publication.

Edward Cardwell, who effectively ran the Bible department of the university press in Oxford, replied to Curtis's attack, which was in the form of a letter to Charles James Blomfield, the Bishop of London, in the British Magazine. There was a Cambridge reply by Thomas Turton, The Text of the English Bible, as Now Printed by the Universities.

== Aftermath of 1839 ==
Successful as a leader opposing the Scottish monopoly, Adam Thomson started a fresh campaign from 1839, to have the corresponding monopoly in England and Wales removed, and the British and Foreign Bible Society was attacked. The London minister John Campbell was his ally, on the issue of making Bibles cheaper; Campbell broached his ideas in Jethro: a system of lay agency, in connexion with Congregational Churches, for the diffusion of the Gospel among our home population (1839), anonymous. Using "author of Jethro" as an open pen name, Campbell published further works. After this period of criticism directed at "Bible monopolists"—supporters of the English monopoly— Campbell desisted. The monopoly stayed in place, but the price of Bibles did come down.

== Parliamentary enquiries ==
Political campaigning against the Bible monopolies dealt with the issue as multi-faceted but one that could be addressed by parliamentary committees. In July 1859 Sir George Lewis, the Home Secretary, replied to Edward Baines in the House of Commons in terms suggesting that "free and unlicensed printing of the Bible" was not what the government supported, on the issue of authentication of the text. A subsequent select committee recommending a free trade solution, Lewis instead renewed the patent in 1860, it being common ground that Bible prices were not likely to decrease further. An anomaly in the taxation of paper was removed shortly, and a Family Bible was seen to be selling in very large numbers.

Robert Besley argued in 1832 that stereotyping was not going to allow cheaper production, on the scale of hundreds of thousands of copies. Thomas Combe was pushed hard by questioning in 1859, on the actions of the Clarendon Press.
