= Frank Ekpenyong =

Nigerian Politician

Frank Udo Ekpenyong

Commissioner for Science and Digital Economy, Akwa Ibom State
- Incumbent
- Assumed office 2025
- Appointed by: Governor Umo Eno

Personal details
- Profession: Politician, Academic, public administrator
- Website: Akwa Ibom State Official Profile

Frank Udo Ekpenyong is a Nigerian politician, academic and public administrator who serves as the commissioner for science and digital economy in Akwa Ibom State, Nigeria. He was appointed to the State Executive Council by Governor Umo Eno

== Early life and background ==
Frank was born on the 8th of January 1980. He is from Ikot Oku Usung, in Ukanafun Local Government, Akwa Ibom State, Nigeria.

== Education ==
Ekpenyong obtained a bachelor's degree in Information Systems from the University of Portsmouth, and earned a master's degree in Information Technology, from the Wageningen University. He barged a Doctor of Philosophy (PhD) in Data Science and Information Systems Management at the University of East London.

== Career ==
Before his appointment as commissioner, Ekpenyong worked in academia and public administration, including lecturing positions and consultancy roles in technology-related fields.

Ekpenyong was appointed a commissioner for science and digital economy, on 25 February 2025. As commissioner for science and digital economy, he is responsible for developing policies that enhance the digital transformation of Akwa Ibom State. His portfolio includes overseeing ICT infrastructure expansion, promoting digital skills and innovation, supporting science education, and advancing e-governance initiatives.

== Awards and honours ==
In 2003, Frank received an Outstanding Foreign Undergraduate Award from TOTALFINAELF, (a multinational oil company formed from the merger of Total, Fina, and Elf), in recognition of his academic performance.

== See also ==
- Executive Council of Akwa Ibom State
