= Emem Aniekanabasi Alban =

Nigerian agronomist, entrepreneur, and humanitarian

- Born: 1 March 1992 (age 34); Akwa Ibom State, Nigeria
- Occupations: Agronomist, entrepreneur, and philanthropist

Emem Aniekanabasi Alban (born November 19, 1984) is a Nigerian agronomist, entrepreneur, and humanitarian. She is the CEO of Emani Farms Giant Limited.

== Early life and education ==
Alban was born on 19 November 1984 in Akwa Ibom State. She grew up in Lagos and attended Nigerian Navy Nursery and Primary School and Command Day Secondary School, Ojo Military Cantonment, and later the University of Uyo, where she earned a degree in Brewing Science and Technology.

== Career ==
Alban is an ambassador of Girls and Women Speak by Peace Ambassadors Advocacy Network an organization affiliated with the United Nations. She is the founder of End Hunger Humanitarian Initiative, a Non-governmental organization.

Alban is one of Nigeria largest private-sector exporters of agricultural products and the 5th largest private exporter of livestock feed in Akwa Ibom.

She championed an innovative approach to sustainable agriculture and logistics systems.

In 2017, she pioneered a business model focused on creating sustainable, community-driven solutions that restore the environment while uplifting local livelihoods.

In 2018, she pioneered an eco-friendly toilet designed to conserve water, reduce waste, and offer a hygienic solution for communities.

In 2024, she was awarded by Bank of Agriculture (Nigeria) (BOA) for her contributions to strengthening Nigeria agriculture sector and empowering farming communities.

== Awards and recognition ==
Alban was awarded the JOM Charity Award and is a Platinum Fellow of the Institute of Leadership, Labor and Manpower Development, a Paul Harris Fellow (Rotary International), and a Fellow of the Institute of Resources and Scientific Management (IRSM).
