= Akwa Ibom State Ministry of Culture and Tourism =

Ministry in Akwa Ibom State, Nigeria

Agency overview
- Jurisdiction: Akwa Ibom State Government
- Headquarters: Idongesit Nkanga Secretariat
- Agency executive: Orman Esin

The Akwa Ibom State Ministry of Culture and Tourism is the state's government branch or ministry, responsible for planning, devising and implementing the state's strategy on culture and tourism.

The ministry is headed by the commissioner charged with overseeing the activities of the ministry.

== See also ==
- List of ministries, agencies and commissions in Akwa Ibom State
- Akwa Ibom State Government
