= Emem Bob =

Nigerian banker and politician (born 1972)

- Born: born 1972
- Occupations: Banker and politician

Emem Almond Bob (born 1 September 1972) is a Nigerian banker and politician. He is the current Commissioner for Finance in Akwa Ibom State.

== Early life and background ==
Bob was born on 1 September 1972. He is from Mkpa Eto in Onna Local Government Area, Akwa ibom state.

== Education ==
Emem holds a Master of Business Administration(MBA) from the University of Port Harcourt Business School.

== Career ==
He is a finance professional with 23 years of experience in the banking sector.

Bob was first appointed as the Commissioner for economic development and was later appointed by Governor Umo Eno as the Commissioner for finance, Akwa Ibom State.
