= Orman Esin =

Nigerian politician

Orman Esin is a Nigerian politician. He served in two ministries in Akwa Ibom State: first as Commissioner for Culture and Tourism, and later as Commissioner for Transport and Petroleum Resources.
