= Frank Archibong =

Nigerian politician

Frank Archibong is a Nigerian politician from Akwa Ibom State. He currently serves as the Commissioner for the Ministry of Local Government and Chieftaincy Affairs.

== Background ==
Frank hails from Ikot Ibiok Village in Eket Local Government Area, Akwa Ibom State.

== Education ==
Archibong began his formal education at Community Primary School, Rumuoamasi, Port Harcourt, Rivers State, where he obtained his First School Leaving Certificate and later proceeded to Methodist Boys High School, Oron, Akwa Ibom State where he obtained his West African Senior School Certificate. He later attended the University of Uyo where he earned a Bachelor of Science (B.Sc.) degree in Marketing.

== Career ==
Frank held various political positions, including Chairman of Eket Local Government Council, Special Adviser, Chairman Association of Local Governments of Nigeria (ALGON), Akwa Ibom State Branch and Commissioner for Local Government and Chieftaincy Affairs.
