= Obong University =

Private university in Obong Ntak, Akwa Ibom State, Nigeria

- Affiliations: Churches of Christ
- Location: Obong Ntak, Akwa Ibom, Nigeria
- Website: www.obonguniversity.edu.ng

Obong University is a private university located in Obong Ntak, Akwa Ibom State, Nigeria. It is associated with the Churches of Christ, and its sponsoring congregation is the Rivergate Church of Christ in Madison, Tennessee.

Founded in 1997 as African College of Management, the following year gave rise to the University of Africa, as Obong University was formerly known.

== History ==
Obong University was established in 2007 in Obong Ntak, Etim Ekpo Local Government Area of Akwa Ibom State, Nigeria. The university was founded by the Churches of Christ. Following approval by the National Universities Commission, the university began admitting undergraduate students in several academic programmes in the late 2000s.

=== List of vice-chancellors ===
Vice-chancellors of Obong University
Name	Tenure
Ime N. Umanah	2007–2012
Moses E. Ekpenyong	2012–2017
David S. Udofia	2017–2021
Francisca Bassey	2021–present
