= Commissioner for Local Government =

Commissioner for Local Government and Chieftaincy Affairs is an official of the Akwa Ibom State Government in Nigeria. The current commissioner is Rt. Hon Victor Etim Antai
