= Isaac E. Orama =

Anglican bishop in Nigeria

Isaac Enenbiyo Orama (born 6 December 1956) was the Anglican Bishop of Uyo in Niger Delta Province from 2006 until his death after a long illness in 2014.

Orama was born on 6 December 1956 at Ekwu in Bayelsa State. He attended Government Comprehensive Secondary School, Port Harcourt, followed by the Rivers State College of Technology where he gained an HND in Business Administration (1981) and an MBA in 1991. He graduated from Trinity Theological College, Umuahia in 1994.

He was a lecturer at Rivers State University for over ten years. He was made the first Archdeacon of Port Harcourt West Archdeaconry by Samuel Onyeuku Elenwo.

He was elected Bishop on 16 September 2006, consecrated on 26 November 2006 at Abuja and enthroned as the Bishop of Uyo on 1 December 2006.

He was quoted in 2007 as describing homosexuals as "inhuman, insane, satanic and not fit to live", remarks which he denied after the involvement of Rowan Williams, Archbishop of Canterbury.
