= Nsikan Nkan =

Nigerian politician and Accountant

Nsikan Linus Nkan is a Nigerian politician and Accountant from Akwa Ibom State. He is current Commissioner for Budget & Economic Planning in Akwa Ibom State.

== Background ==
Nkan is from Ibesikpo Asutan local government area in Akwa Ibom State.

== Education ==
Nsikan earned his Bachelor of Science degree in Accounting from the University of Uyo, Akwa Ibom State. He then obtained a Master of Business Administration from Ekiti State University, Ekiti State. He holds a Doctor of Philosophy in Accounting from the University of Uyo, Akwa Ibom State. He has also attended both the London Business School and Harvard Business School.

== Career ==
In 2015, Nkan was appointed the Akwa Ibom State Accountant General, where he served until 2016. He also served as Commissioner for Finance in Akwa Ibom State from 2016 to 2025. In February 2025, he was reappointed as Commissioner for Budget & Economic Planning in Akwa Ibom State.
