= Monday Uko =

Nigerian politician

- Citizenship: Nigerian
- Occupation: Politician
- Political party: Peoples Democratic Party

Monday Ebong Uko is a Nigerian politician and a former member of the People's Democratic Party who serves as a commissioner for youths and sports in Akwa Ibom State.
