= Peter Godsday Orubebe =

Nigerian politician

Federal Minister of Niger Delta
- In office 6 April 2010 – 12 February 2014
- Preceded by: Ufot Ekaette
- Succeeded by: Stephen Oru

Personal details
- Born: 6 June 1959 (age 67) Burutu, Delta, Nigeria

Peter Godsday Orubebe (born 6 June 1959) was appointed Nigerian Minister of Niger Delta on 6 April 2010 when acting president Goodluck Jonathan announced his new cabinet.

== Background ==
Orubebe was born on 6 June 1959 at Ogbobagbene, Burutu Local Government Area in Delta State. He is of Ijaw descent. He attended the University of Lagos, gaining a B.Sc. in political science in 1985. Later he obtained a master's degree in international relations from Ambrose Alli University, Ekpoma in 2005.

== Political career ==
Orubebe became a supervisory councilor, and later chairman of Burutu LGA. In July 2007, President Umaru Yar'Adua appointed him Minister of Special Duties. Later he became Minister of State for Niger Delta Affairs when that ministry was created in December 2008. In January 2010, he said that the proposed 10% equity share policy on infrastructural development in the Niger Delta region would make vandalism and crisis a thing of the past.

== Controversy ==
On 31 March 2015, Orubebe, acting as a polling agent for the PDP, made attempts at disrupting the proceedings of the 2015 presidential election collation. Orubebe alleged that INEC Chairman, Attahiru Jega, had taken side with the main opposition political party, APC. He however subsequently apologized to Nigerians over his conduct by tendering an unreserved apology urging them not to follow in his footsteps and explaining that he regretted his action.
