= Ikot Nya =

From Uyo to Ikot Nya through Nung Udoe in Ibesikpo-Asutan Local Government Area to Afaha Offiong in Nsit Ibom local government and then Ikot Nya village. Ikot Nya is a sub clan under Mbiaso Clan District in the List of Towns and Villages in Nsit Ubium/Nsit Ibom LGA, Akwa Ibom State, Nigerian. Ikot Nya is a village sharing boundary with Mbiokporo No. ll village in Nsit Ibom Local Government Area, Akwa Ibom State, Nigeria.
