= Emmanuel Nglass =

Anglican bishop in Nigeria

Emmanuel Ebenezer Nglass was the Anglican Bishop of Uyo in Niger Delta Province of the Church of Nigeria from 1990 until 2005.

Nglass was born on 3 January 1947. He attended Government Teacher Training College, Ikot Obio Itong (1971–74), College of Education, Uyo (1975–78) and graduated from the University of Nigeria, Nsukka in 1982 with a BA in Education. He attended Trinity Union Theological College, Umuahia (1983–84) and the University of Ibadan (1985–86).

He was a lecturer at the College of Education, Uyo (1982–83) and at the University of Cross River State, Uyo (1984–90). He was Archdeacon of Uyo from 1984 until 1990 when he became the pioneer Bishop of Uyo. He became Archbishop of Niger Delta Province. He had retired from both posts by 2007.

He died in 2016.
