= Ministry of Niger Delta Affairs =

Government Ministry of Nigeria

Ministry of Niger Delta Development
Ministry overview
- Formed: September 10, 2008
- Minister responsible: Abubakar Momoh
- Website: www.nigerdelta.gov.ng

The Ministry of Niger Delta Development is one of the Federal Ministries of Nigeria. It focuses on the infrastructural development, environmental protection and empowerment of youths in the oil rich Niger Delta region. It was announced by the then Nigerian President Umaru Yar'Adua on 10 September 2008.

== History ==
=== Background ===
The existing Niger Delta Development Commission (NDDC) was to become a parastatal under the ministry. Yar'Adua said that the Ministry would coordinate efforts to tackle the challenges of infrastructural development, environment protection and youth empowerment in the Niger Delta.

The Movement for the Emancipation of the Niger Delta (MEND) treated the announcement with caution, saying the new Ministry could be yet another avenue for corruption and political favoritism. Although the Delta region is the main source of government income, it is poor and poorly governed, suffering from violence and corruption. Activists have called for real government in the region, infrastructural development and jobs. Human rights activists are concerned that the new bureaucracy will stall progress in addressing these issues.

=== Establishment ===
In December 2008, Yar'Adua appointed Ufot Ekaette as Minister of Niger Delta Affairs and Godsday Orubebe as Minister of State. The Permanent Secretary was Dr. Yahaya A. Abdullahi. In July 2009 Yar'Adua appointed Larry Koinyan of Bayelsa State, a retired Air Vice Marshal, as the new chairman of the NDDC. In August 2009, the Ministry held a job fair in Abuja attended by over 30 companies. The ministry claimed that over 11,000 jobs and training offers were secured during the fair. In November 2009, President Yar'Adua proposed to allocate N64bn to the Niger Delta ministry for its 2010 budget. Defending the proposed budget in December 2009 before the Senate Committee on Niger Delta, chaired by Senator James Manager, Obong Uffot Ekaette explained that the ministry had difficulties achieving targets in 2009 because the N19.5bn allocated for its projects was unevenly spread. Ex-militants have protested the award of contracts to companies from outside the region, indicating that these projects may be disrupted by aggrieved local people.

A March 2012 report in the Vanguard indicated that relatively little had been accomplished in the first four years. Projects to improve roads, build skills acquisition centers and improve water and electricity supplies were far behind schedule. Large amounts had been budgeted and spent for projects related to waterfront development including dredging and port development but nothing tangible had been done. There was also a large gap between federal promises and amounts released. A spokesman for the ministry said the priority would be on completing existing projects rather than starting new ones. The ministry denied allegations of project duplication.

== Ministers ==
- Ufot Ekaette (24 December 2008 – 17 March 2010)
- Peter Godsday Orubebe (6 April 2010 – 12 February 2014)
- Stephen Oru (9 July 2014 – 29 May 2015)
- Usani Uguru Usani (11 November 2015 – 29 May 2019)
- Godswill Akpabio (21 August 2019 – 11 May 2022)
- Umana Okon Umana (July 2022 – April 2023)
- Abubakar Momoh (since 27 October 2023)

== See also ==
- Federal Ministries of Nigeria
