= Stephen Oru =

Nigerian politician

Dr Stephen Orise Oru
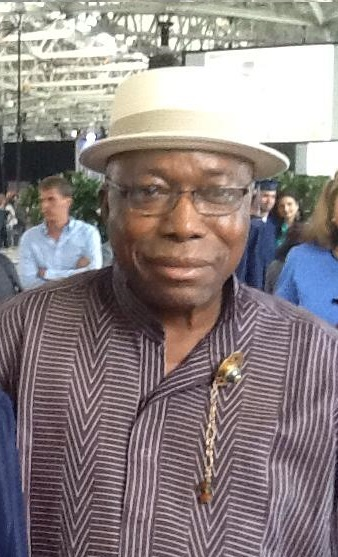
- Former Minister of Niger Delta Affairs

Federal Minister of Niger Delta
- In office 9 July 2014 – 29 May 2015
- Preceded by: Peter Godsday Orubebe
- Succeeded by: Usani Uguru Usani

Personal details
- Born: Ughelli, Delta State, Nigeria
- Party: The People's Democratic Party
- Education: Ahmadu Bello University; Ohio State University

Stephen Orise Oru is a Nigerian politician. He is a former Minister of Niger Delta Affairs of the Federal Republic of Nigeria.

== Early life and education ==
Stephen Oru was born in Delta State, Ughelli North L.G.A. He attended Government College, Ughelli. He obtained a Bachelor of Arts in 1974 and a Masters of Arts in Education in 1976 from Ahmadu Bello University. He furthered his studies in the United States where he obtained a PhD from Ohio State University, Columbus, Ohio in 1978

== Career ==
Oru began his political career in 1982 with the National Party of Nigeria (NPN) as the Secretary of Youth Wing, Ughelli LGA, Bendel State. Since then, he has held various positions within Nigeria's political scene; some of which include:

- State Youth Leader, National Party of Nigeria, Bendel State - 1983
- State Financial Secretary, National Party of Nigeria, Bendel State - 1983
- Member of Transition Committee, Bendel State - 1983
- Founding Member of the People's Democratic Party of Nigeria - 1998
- Deputy National Secretary, People's Democratic Party of Nigeria - 2005-2008
- Secretary, PDP Disciplinary Committee - 2005-2008
- Member, Delta State PDP Caucus - 2005-2008
- Coordinator PDP Foreign Chapters - 2005-2008
- Acting National Secretary, PDP - 2007
- Member and Secretary, PDP National Reconciliation Committee under the Chairmanship of His Excellency, Dr. Alex Ekwueme, GCON - 2007
- Delta State Coordinator, Goodluck/Sambo Presidential Campaign Organization - 2010-2011
- Member, South-South Goodluck-Sambo Presidential Campaign Council - 2010-2011
- Member, Delta State Gubernatorial Campaign Council- 2010-2011
- Member, Delta State People's Democratic Party's Reconciliation Committee - 2011
- PDP National Vice Chairman(South-South) 2012-2014

Other notable non-political capacities held by Oru in the past:

- Member of Senate, University of Benin - 1982-1983
- Director, Integrated Development Services Limited (IDSL), a Subsidiary of the Nigerian National Petroleum Corporation - 2001-2004
- Chairman, National Board of Technical Education (NBTE) - 2005-2007
- Chairman, Governing Board of Delta State College of Education - 2007-2009
- Chairman, Governing Board of Delta State Polytechnic. 2009-2014
- Member, Ahmadu Bello University Council - 2009-2011
- Chairman, University of Calabar Teaching Hospital, Cross River State - 2013-2014
