= Tupocracy =

Nigerian political theory of exemplary leadership

Tupocracy (from Ancient Greek: "tupos" and "krateia") is a system of government or a style of leadership where leaders set positive and inspiring precedents through their own actions and behaviors. Instead of merely directing or commanding others, a leader who practices leadership by example demonstrates the desired values, work ethic, and integrity consistently. By modelling the behaviours and attitudes they expect from their team or followers, they inspire and motivate others to follow suit.This approach fosters trust, credibility, and a sense of shared purpose, resulting in a more engaged and productive group.

The term "tupocracy" was coined by Godwin Akpan Amaowoh, a Nigerian clergyman and scholar, in 2006 when he used it as the topic for his PhD dissertation at the University of Nigeria, Nsukka. He defined tupocracy as "a system of government where leaders lead by example" and argued that it was a viable alternative to other forms of government such as democracy, aristocracy, oligarchy, autocracy, gerontocracy etc.

== History ==
Amaowoh developed the concept of tupocracy based on his observation of the leadership styles of some Nigerian politicians and religious leaders. He claimed that tupocracy was not a new idea, but rather a revival of an ancient practice that was common among the early Christians and some African societies. Governor of Akwa Ibom Udom Emmanuel, Enugu state Ifeanyi Ugwuanyi and Benue state Samuel Ortom are Nigeria governors to have adopted the propounded system of government. Former president of Uruguay José Mujica is an examples of tupocratic leaders.

Amaowoh's dissertation on tupocracy was approved by the University of Nigeria in 2007 and he was awarded a PhD in political science. He later published his work as a book titled Tupocracy: A Political Doctrine for the 21st Century. He also founded the Tupocratic Movement, a non-governmental organization that promotes the principles and values of tupocracy in Nigeria and beyond.

Amanim Akpabio a professor of law at the Faculty of Law, University of Uyo, Nigeria and also the President of the Legal Research Gender Rights and Leadership Initiative (LEGENDLI) once wrote the following in a paper presentation about Tupocracy and the word has also been published into a book which is now being adopted for certain courses in higher institutions.

Tupocracy could be in government, leadership or any form of administration that requires a group of people with the authority to govern a country or state; a particular ministry in office.
