= Idongesit Nkanga =

Nigerian politician (1952–2020)

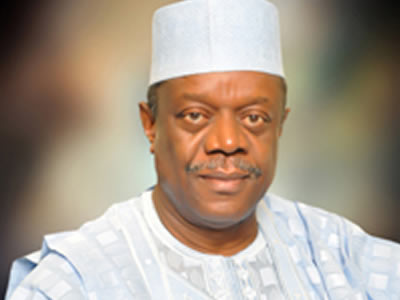

Governor of Akwa Ibom State
- In office 5 September 1990 – 2 January 1992
- Deputy: Ufot Ekaette
- Preceded by: Godwin Abbe
- Succeeded by: Akpan Isemin

Personal details
- Born: 27 January 1952 Ikot Nya
- Died: 24 December 2020 (aged 68)

Military service
- Allegiance: Nigeria
- Branch/service: Nigerian Airforce
- Rank: Air Commodore
- Commands: Akwa Ibom State

Air Commodore Otuekong Idongesit Nkanga (27 January 1952 – 24 December 2020) was a Nigerian former Air Commodore.

== Career ==
He was governor of Akwa Ibom State in Nigeria from September 1990 to January 1992 during the military regime of General Ibrahim Babangida, handing over to an elected civilian Governor at the start of the Nigerian Third Republic. Idongesit Nkanga

When appointed in 1990, his deputy governor was Obong Ufot Ekaette, who later became Secretary to the Government of the Federation. The Akwa Ibom Broadcasting Corporation was established by edict in April 1988. Wing Commander Nkanga officially commissioned the station on 27 July 1991.

In May 2001, Nkanga became a member of the board of the Cooperative Development Bank. In 2002, he was said to seeking to be candidate for the Nigeria Democratic Party (NDP) in the 2003 elections for Governor of Akwa-Ibom State. In 2007, Nkanga was appointed Chairman of the Akwa Ibom Airport Implementation Committee. The International airport was opened on November 26, 2009. Although the primary focus was on cargo traffic and airplane maintenance repair and overhaul, the airport started by serving commercial local passenger flights.

In December 2009, as an elder of the Ibibio people he supported the Akwa-Ibom state Governor Godswill Akpabio. In January 2010, he was a member of the South-South Elders and Leaders' Forum. Discussing the issue of handing over from the ailing President Umaru Yar'Adua to Vice-president Goodluck Jonathan, he said the issue was not a north–south one, but was about following the constitution.

== Death ==
Nkanga died from COVID-19 on 24 December 2020, aged 68.
