= Foundation College of Technology =

Private College of Technology in Nigeria

- Type: Private polytechnic
- Chairman: Edet A. Ekanem
- Location: Ikot Idem Offikono Road, Ikot Ekpene, Akwa Ibom, Nigeria

Foundation College of Technology is a privately owned polytechnic located at Ikot Idem Offikono Road, Ikot Ekpene Akwa Ibom State, in southeastern Nigeria.

== Background ==
The institution was founded in 2013. It was granted the accreditation of all its programmes in 2014 by the National Board for Technical Education (NBTE) with the Joint Admissions Matriculation Board (JAMB) listing it as one of the institutions for prospective candidates to choose for admission. The programmes of the institution are targeted towards producing graduates that can serve in the lower and middle cadre of hi-tech workplaces or lead in start-ups in the field of technology.

== Courses ==
The institution offers various courses under the following departments;

- Computer Software Engineering Technology
- Electrical/Electronic Engineering Technology
- Management Technology
- Networking and System Security
- Petroleum Engineering Technology

== See also ==
- List of Polytechnics in Nigeria
