= Kwa Ibo River =

River of Nigeria

Kwa Ilbo River
- Location of mouth

Location
- Country: Nigeria
- State: Abia State

Physical characteristics
- Mouth
  - coordinates: 4°32′27″N 7°59′19″E

Basin features
- Progression: Atlantic Ocean

The Kwa Ibo River (also Quaibo River) is a river that rises near Umuahia in Abia State, Nigeria, and flows in a southeastern direction through Akwa Ibom State to the Atlantic Ocean.

stern side of the Kwa Ibo River about 3 kilometres (2 mi) from the river mouth, is one of the largest fishing settlements on the Nigerian coast. The Kwa Ibo River discharges 92,900 tonnes of plastic under the lower mass input category and 20,800 tonnes at the upper mass input category.

== Pollution ==
The Kwa Ibo river according to River Plastic Emissions is among the top 20 polluting rivers accounting for 67 per cent of global plastic inflow into the ocean.
