= Anietie Udofia =

Nigerian public administrator and politician

Anietie Nseowo Udofia is a Nigerian academic, public administrator, and politician currently serving as the Commissioner for Culture and Tourism in Akwa Ibom State. He was appointed in February 2025 by Governor Umo Eno, succeeding Charles Udoh in this role.

== Early life and family ==
Born on November 10, 1986, he is a native of Ikot Eyienge Ikono, Akwa Ibom State. He is married to Mrs. Emem Anieti Nseowo with three children.

== Academic career ==
Udofia earned a bachelor’s degree in 2010. He proceeded to the University of Uyo where he obtained a master’s degree in public administration in 2015. He further earned a doctorate degree from the University of Nigeria in 2023. Prior to his appointment as Commissioner, Udofia served as a lecturer in the Department of Political Science and Public Administration at the University of Uyo from 2014–2015. His research interests include public sector reforms, sustainable development, and political socialization. He has contributed to various academic publications, such as:Sustainable Development Goal 1 and Poverty Reduction in Nigeria: The Implementation Challenges; State Joint Local Government Account and Service Delivery for Development Administration in Nigeria; Public Sector Reforms and Service Delivery in Nigeria: Issues, Challenges and Prospects.
