= Imiegba =

Village (Town) in Edo state

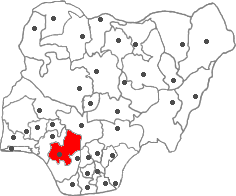
The Map of Nigeria highlighting the whole parts of Edo state as Red

Imiegba is a village in Edo state, precisely Etsako East local government in Nigeria.

== History ==
The Imiegba are a clan within the broader Etsakọ people of Edo State, Nigeria, The northern region of Edo State is home to the Etsakọ, an ethnic group distinguished by common values, history, and rituals among their member clans, including the Imiegba. Imiegba is surrounded by other towns and villages like Okpekpe, Itsukwi, Imiakebu, Ebelle, Ukhomedokhai, Okeko, Ikphelli, Ukho, etc.

== Culture ==
Every society has its own culture, which is its way of life. The Edo language is rich in meaning, but the word imiegba does not have a linguistic meaning on its own. The imiegba culture focuses on traditional knowledge systems, deep history of pottery, that fulfills both practical and spiritual roles, with particular pots such as the perforated, Additionally, the culture encompasses taboos that regulate pottery production to maintain community hygiene and highlights the interplay of art, science, technology, symbolism, and religion within the realm of pottery.

== Population ==
There isn't a specific population figure for Imiegba, but it is located in Nigeria, in the area inhabited by the Etsako people, with an estimated total population of about 1 to 1.5 million. Imiegba is among various towns and villages near Okpekpe, which is the residence of a portion of the Three Ibie (North Ibie) people.

== Schools ==
- Primary School imiegba
- Imiegba Grammar School, Imiegba
- De Lion primary school
