= Anglican Diocese of Uyo =

Anglican diocese in Nigeria

The Anglican Diocese of Uyo is one of ten dioceses within the Anglican Province of the Niger Delta, itself one of 14 ecclesiastical provinces within the Church of Nigeria. The current bishop is the Right Rev. Prince Asukwo Antai.

The first bishop of the diocese was Emmanuel Nglass in 1990. Orama was consecrated a bishop on November 26, 2006, at the Cathedral Church of the Advent, Abuja. Prince Asukwo Antai was elected on 9 August 2014.

== Bishops ==
Bishop	Years
Emmanuel Nglass	1990–2006
Isaac Orama	2006–2014
Prince Asukwo Antai	2014–2023

|Owen A. Ukafia |2024-Present
