= Akwa Ibom State Ministry of Education =

Ministry in Akwa Ibom State, Nigeria

Agency overview
- Type: Ministry
- Jurisdiction: Akwa Ibom State
- Headquarters: Uyo, Akwa Ibom State, Nigeria
- Agency executive: Prof. Ubong Essien Umoh, Commissioner for Education
- Parent department: Government of Akwa Ibom State

The Akwa Ibom State Ministry of Education is the state government's ministry tasked with overseeing the education sector in the state, policy formulation and control over Primary, Secondary and State-owned Tertiary Institutions in consonance with the National Policy on Education, and monitoring and evaluation of educational programmes to ensure quality. It is located at block 10, Idongesit Nkanga Secretariat, Uyo.

== Leadership ==
The Commissioner is in charge of overseeing the daily activities of the Ministry. The current commissioner of Education appointed by Governor Umo Eno in 2025 is Prof. Ubong Essien Umoh.

== Achievement ==
The education sector in Akwa Ibom State has seen monumental strides owing particularly to the free, compulsory, and qualitative education initiated by the Godswill Akpabio administration where the cost of education in Primary and Secondary school is free.
