= Prince Asukwo Antai =

Anglican bishop in Nigeria

Prince Asukwo Antai, formerly former Archdeacon of Abak, is an Anglican bishop in Nigeria: he is the current Bishop of Uyo one of nine in the Anglican Province of the Niger Delta, itself one of 14 within the Church of Nigeria.

He was elected as Bishop of Uyo at the 11th General Synod of the Church of Nigeria, held at the Cathedral Church of the Good Shepherd, Enugu, in September 2014.
