= Eme Ufot Ekaette =

Nigerian politician

Senator for Akwa Ibom South
- In office 29 May 2007 – May 2011
- Preceded by: Udoma Udo Udoma
- Succeeded by: Helen Esuene

Personal details
- Born: 21 July 1945 (age 81) Akwa Ibom State, Nigeria
- Party: People's Democratic Party
- Spouse: Married
- Education: Obafemi Awolowo University
- Profession: Pharmacist, Politician

Eme Ufot Ekaette (b. 1945 ) is a Nigerian politician from Nduo Eduo-Eket, in Akwa Ibom State. She has been married to Obong Joseph Ufot-Ekaette since 1971.

== Early life and education ==
Eme was born 21 July 1945 in Nduo Eduo-Eket, Akwa Ibom State, Nigeria. She had her early education at Banham Memorial School, Port Harcourt between 1952 and 1958. She attended Queen's College, Lagos between 1958–1963 and Queen's School, Enugu between 1964 and 1966. Ekaette obtained B.Pharm. (Hons) at Obafemi Awolowo University, Ife in 1970.

== Profession and personal life ==
Ekaette is a Pharmacist, Businesswoman, and former Lawmaker. Ekaette is Igbo and identifies as a Christian.

== Politics ==
She was elected Senator for the Akwa Ibom South constituency of Akwa Ibom State, Nigeria, taking office on 29 May 2007. She is a member of the People's Democratic Party (PDP).

After taking her seat in the Senate in June 2007, Ekaette was appointed to committees on Women and Youth, Local and Foreign Debts, Health and Environment. In a mid-term evaluation of Senators in May 2009, ThisDay noted that she had not sponsored any bills but had shown committed leadership to her Women Affairs Development Committee. Later she sponsored a bill on Indecent Dressing, which became known as the nudity bill. The proposed legislation would prescribe three months imprisonment for women who display their belly buttons, breasts or wear mini skirts in public places. The bill was presented by a Nigerian delegation to the United Nations General Assembly, where it drew some criticism, and was a subject of considerable controversy in Nigeria. Ekaette was the first Female President of the Pharmaceutical Society of Nigeria (PSN).

== Career ==
She became a Manager Pharmacy at NNPC, Chief Pharmacy at Military Hospital, managing director at Safi Pharm, board member of UBEC and a director of Union Bank. Her husband, Ufot Ekaette, was a senior civil servant who was appointed Secretary to the Government of the Federation (SGF) on 29 May 1999 by President Olusegun Obasanjo, and later served as Federal Minister of Niger Delta in the cabinet of President Umaru Yar'Adua.

== Honours and titles ==
She was honoured as Member of the Order of the Federal Republic (MFR), 2001 and Lady of St. Christopher. She also was honoured with a traditional title as Adiaha Ikpaisong Oruk Anam, 1991 and Obonganwan Akwa Ibom, 1991.
