= Imoh Moffat =

Nigerian statistician and politician

Imoh Udo Moffat (born 10 April 1968) is a Nigerian statistician and politician. He has served as the Commissioner for Science and Technology in Akwa Ibom State since August 2020 and was reappointed under Governor Umo Bassey Eno in July 2023.

== Early life and education ==
Moffat was born on 10 April 1968 in Etim Ekpo Local Government Area of Akwa Ibom State.

== Career ==
He began his academic career in 1994 as a Graduate Assistant in the Department of Mathematics, Statistics & Computer Science at the University of Uyo. He holds an M.Sc. in Mathematical Statistics from the University of Calabar (2000) and a Ph.D. from Rivers State University of Science & Technology (2008). Through the years, he advanced in rank, Senior Lecturer (2011), Associate Professor (2017), and full Professor (2022). Academic Career at the University of Uyo, Moffat has lectured in mathematical sciences for nearly three decades.

Moffat was first appointed Commissioner for Science and Technology on 3 August 2020 under Governor Udom Emmanuel. In that role, he led infrastructure and digital upgrades in the ministry, this includes restoring electricity, refurbishing vehicles, restoring internet, upgrading laboratories, and establishing computer labs in secondary schools across the state. He conducted an assessment of the underutilized Ibom e-library, advocating for its swift rehabilitation and exploring a public – private partnership model to revive its services. On 27 July 2023, Governor Umo Bassey Eno retained Moffat in the executive council as Commissioner for Science and Technology.

== Personal life ==
Moffat is married, has five children, and practices Christianity.
