= Offiong Offor =

Nigerian politician and academician

Commissioner for Agriculture and Rural Development

Personal details
- Born: Akwa Ibom State, Nigeria
- Education: University of Calabar; Michael Okpara University of Agriculture; University of Nigeria, Nsukka
- Occupation: Politician, academician
- Known for: Agriculture and rural development

Offiong Offor is a Nigerian politician and academician from Akwa Ibom State. She serves as the current commissioner for agriculture and rural development in Akwa Ibom State.

== Education ==
Offiong got a Bachelor of Science degree from the University of Calabar, Cross River State, and also got her master's degree from Michael Okpara University of Agriculture, Umudike, She holds a Ph.D. in agricultural economics from the University of Nigeria, Nsukka.

== Career ==
Offor was a lecturer at the Akwa Ibom State University. She also managed consultancy services for United States Agency for International Development (USAID).
