= George Offor =

English book collector

George Offor (1787– 7 August 1864) was an English book-collector who accumulated a massive personal library.

Offor entered business as a bookseller at Tower Hill, London. He studied Hebrew, Greek and Latin and became an expert in sixteenth- and seventeenth-century English literature and theological writings.

Offor died at his home, Grove House, Grove Street, South Hackney, London, on 4 August 1864, and was buried in Abney Park Cemetery, Stoke Newington.

== Works ==
=== John Bunyan ===
He had compiled the complete works of John Bunyan. However some of them were destroyed in a fire.

He spent his days reading, researching, recording, comparing, and editing the works of Bunyan. Offor's diligent labour concluded in 1854 with the printing of the three-volume, 2,800 page Works of John Bunyan. Now over a century and a half old, Offor's final product remains the most popular definitive collection of Bunyan in print.

=== Auction ===
After his death, his huge collection of books was to be auctioned on 27 June 1865, for 11 days by Sotheby's. However, on 29 June, a fire consumed nearly all the items that were for sale.

== Bibliography ==
- George Offor (1816). A Catalogue of New and Second-Hand Books.
- George Offor (1822). Salvation, received by Faith, communicating Peace. The substance of a Sermon, occasioned by the death of Elizabeth Offor, With a memoir of her life. J. Gladding.
- William Tyndale (1836). George Offor (ed.). The New Testament of Our Lord and Saviour Jesus Christ. S. Bagster.
- Roger Williams (1848). The Bloudy Tenet of Persecution. Hanserd Knollys Society.
- Increase Mather (1856). George Offor (ed.). Remarkable Providences illustrative of the earlier days of American colonisation. J.R. Smith.
- John Bunyan (1850). George Offor (ed.). The Works of John Bunyan: With an introduction to each treatise, notes, and a sketch of his life, times, and contemporaries. Vol. 1. Blackie and son.
- John Bunyan (1862). George Offor (ed.). The Whole Works of John Bunyan. Vol. 2. Blackie.
- John Bunyan (1853). George Offor (ed.). The Works of John Bunyan: Allegorical, figurative, and symbolical. Vol. 3. Blackie and son.
