= Akwa Ibom State Ministry of Justice =

Ministry in Akwa Ibom State, Nigeria

Ministry overview
- Jurisdiction: Government of Akwa Ibom State
- Headquarters: Idongesit Nkanga Secretariat
- Ministry executive: Barr. Uko Essien Udom, Commissioner

The Akwa Ibom State Ministry of Justice is the Nigerian state government ministry, concerned with the administration of justice. The Ministry is under the coordination of the Attorney-General and Commissioner for Justice, who is often assisted by the Solicitor-General and Permanent Secretary.

== Leadership ==
The Commissioner is in charge of overseeing the daily activities of the Ministry. The current commissioner of health appointed by Governor Umo Eno in 2025 is Uko Essien Udom, SAN.

The Permanent Secretary supports the general policies and priorities of the government which operates within the context of the management practices and procedures created for the government as a whole.

== Directorate ==
Department of Public Prosecution

Department of Civil Litigations

Department of Legal Drafting

Sexual and Gender Based Violence Response Department

Department of Estate Administration

Department of planning, Research and Statistics

Department of Administration and Supplies

Department of Finance and Account

Center for Alternative Dispute Resolution (CADR)

A Law Reform Commission.

== See also ==
- Akwa Ibom State Ministry of Education
