= Ufot Ekaette =

Nigerian politician (1939–2019)

- Preceded by: Position established

Federal Minister of Niger Delta
- In office 24 December 2008 – 17 March 2010
- Succeeded by: Peter Godsday Orubebe

Secretary to the Government of the Federation
- In office 29 May 1999 – 28 May 2007
- President: Olusegun Obasanjo
- Preceded by: Gidado Idris
- Succeeded by: Baba Gana Kingibe

Personal details
- Born: 17 April 1939 Onna, Akwa Ibom, Nigeria
- Died: 25 September 2019 (aged 80)

Ufot Ekaette (17 April 1939 – 25 September 2019) was a Nigerian politician, appointed as the first Nigerian Minister of Niger Delta on 17 December 2008 by President Umaru Yar'Adua. He left office in March 2010 when acting president Goodluck Jonathan dissolved his cabinet.

== Background ==
Ekaette was born in 1939 in Ikot Edor, Onna Local Government Area, Akwa Ibom State and died on the 25th day of September 2019. He attended King's College, Lagos, graduating in 1960, then went to University College, Ibadan where he earned a B.Sc. in economics in 1964. He joined the Federal Civil Service on 28 July 1964. Ekaette was principal secretary to head of state General Yakubu Gowon (1968–1975).

Later Ekaette served in the Federal Ministries of Industries (1975), Information (1977–1979), Education (1979) and National Planning (1979–1983). He was secretary, Public Service Department and Head of Service (1984). He was director, External Finance at the Federal Ministry of Finance (1985–86). Ekaette was appointed permanent secretary, Federal Ministry of Industries in January 1986, then permanent secretary, Federal Ministry of Works and Housing in 1988. He was director-general, Directorate of Food, Roads and Rural Infrastructure (June 1988 – March 1989), director-general, Federal Ministry of Social Development, Youth and Sports (1989) and director-general (planning), Federal Ministry of Budget and Planning (1990). In 1990, he was appointed Deputy Governor of Akwa Ibom State under Air Commodore Idongesit Nkanga. In 1996, he became a non-executive director of First Bank of Nigeria, a post he held until May 1999.

Ekaette died on 25 September 2019, at the age of 80.

== Political career ==
Ekaette was appointed secretary to the Government of the Federation (SGF) on 29 May 1999 by President Olusegun Obasanjo, holding office until the end of Obasanjo's second term in May 2007. In April 2007, his wife Eme Ufot Ekaette was elected senator for Akwa Ibom South on the People's Democratic Party (PDP) platform.

On 24 December 2008 he was sworn in as Minister for Niger Delta Affairs. His appointment was criticized by the militant Joint Revolutionary Council, who said that he lacked the drive and leadership required, and questioned the sincerity and commitment of Yar'Adua in making this choice. Talking to oil company executives in February 2009, he said that the low level of development in the Niger Delta region and the crisis in the Niger Delta could have been avoided if the local people had received benefits from oil and gas development. He pointed out that in many cases workers had been brought in from other areas of the country, while locals suffered from pollution and lack of basic facilities.

In March 2010 the Joint Revolutionary Council called for the removal of Ekaette for alleged duplication of development projects in the Niger Delta. A statement said among other things that "Chief Ufot Ekaette is incompetent and unqualified to lead a ministry as sensitive as the Ministry of Niger Delta."
