= Moses Ekpo =

Nigerian politician

Moses Frank Ekpo (born in Akwa Ibom State) is a Nigerian politician and the former Deputy Governor of Akwa Ibom State. He was popularly known as "Uncle Mo".

== Early life and education ==
Moses Frank Ekpo was born on 22 December 1941 in Ikot Obiodo, Abak, in present-day Akwa Ibom State, Nigeria. He received his primary education at Government School, Abak, before attending Holy Family College (HOFACO), Oku Abak, for his secondary education. He pursued studies in journalism and mass communication at the London Polytechnic in the United Kingdom and the Institute for Mass Communications in Berlin, Germany. He later attended the University of Wisconsin, Madison, in the United States, where he obtained a degree in journalism.

== Career ==
Moses Frank Ekpo began his journalism career in 1960 as a proofreader and correspondent with the Daily Express. He worked with the West African Pilot and later joined the Western Nigeria Broadcasting Service (WNBS), where he served as a senior sub-editor and broadcaster. He was later transferred to the Eastern Nigeria Broadcasting Service (ENBS) in Enugu as a senior news editor.

In 1971, Ekpo became the pioneer editor of the Nigerian Chronicle in Calabar. He served in that capacity until the mid-1970s, when he was appointed pioneer Director of Public Relations in the Cross River State Government.

During his public service career, Ekpo held several positions in information management, public relations, diplomacy and government administration, Commissioner for Information in Cross River State and Akwa Ibom State; and National Commissioner of the National Population Commission.

Ekpo also served as a correspondent for the Voice of America (VOA), the British Broadcasting Corporation (BBC), and Deutsche Welle. He held senior editorial and management positions in several media organisations.

In the field of intellectual property administration, Ekpo served as Director-General of the Nigerian Copyright Commission. He became President of the General Assembly of the World Intellectual Property Organization (WIPO).

== Political Career ==
Moses Ekpo served as Commissioner for Information in both Cross River State and Akwa Ibom State during his public service career. Following years in journalism, public relations, and government administration, he became actively involved in partisan politics in Akwa Ibom State.

In 2015, Ekpo was elected Deputy Governor of Akwa Ibom State on the under the umbrella of the Peoples Democratic Party (PDP) alongside Governor Udom Emmanuel. He was re-elected in 2019 and served two consecutive terms in office, becoming the first deputy governor in the state's Fourth Republic to complete an uninterrupted eight-year tenure.

During his tenure as deputy governor, Ekpo represented the state government at official functions, participated in policy implementation, and was regarded as a key political ally of Governor Udom Emmanuel. In 2021, he publicly denied reports that he intended to contest for the Akwa Ibom North-West Senatorial seat, stating that he had no plans to seek elective office after completing his tenure.

Ekpo left office on 29 May 2023 at the end of the second term of the Emmanuel administration and was succeeded by Akon Eyakenyi as Deputy Governor of Akwa Ibom State.
