= Idongesit Nkanga Secretariat =

Government Secretariat Complex

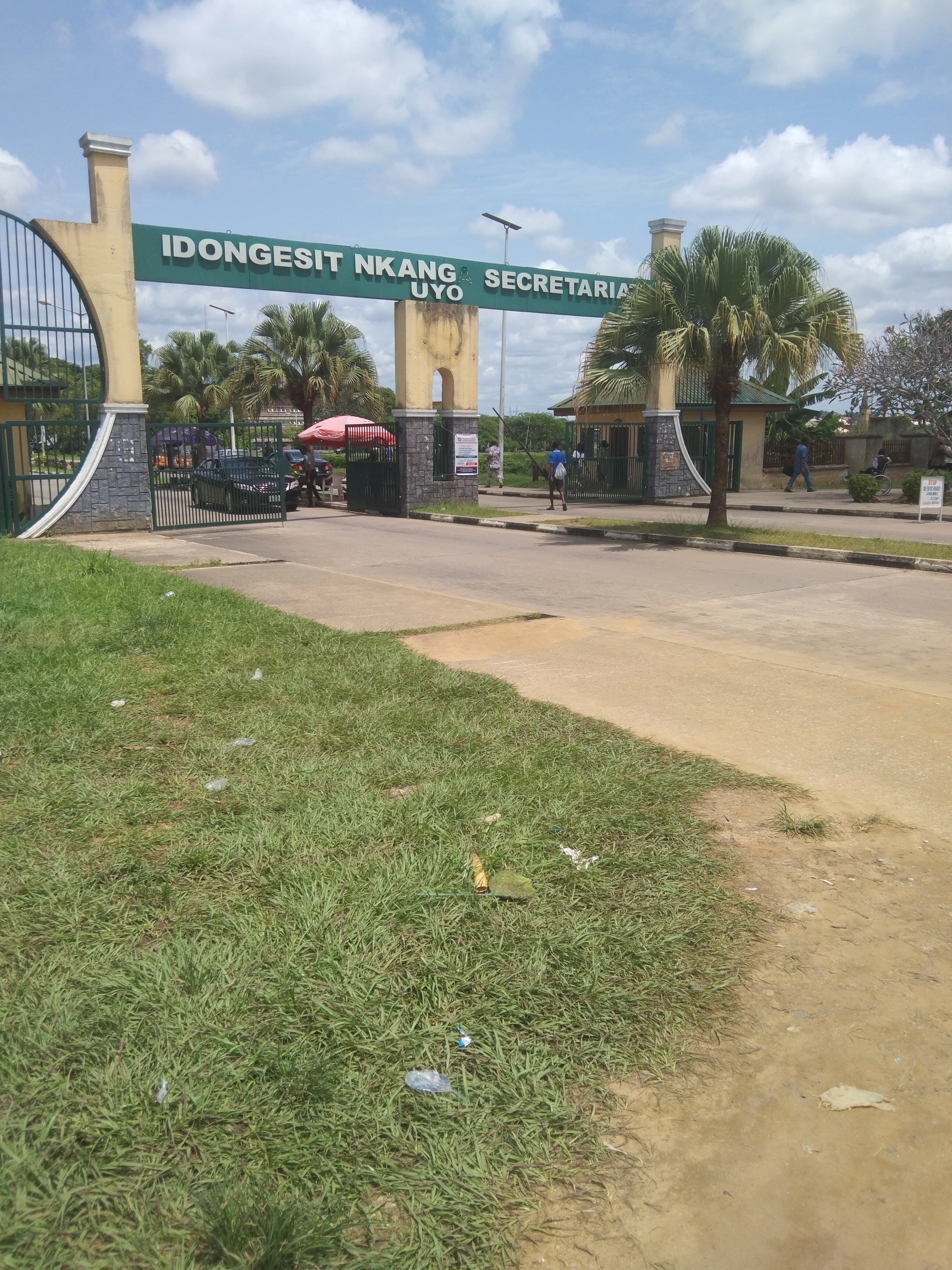
Idongesit Nkanga Secretariat, Entrance

Idongesit Nkanga Secretariat is a government office complex at Ibrahim Babangida (IBB) Avenue, Uyo, Akwa Ibom State, Nigeria.

Map of Uyo Local Government Area showing Idongesit Nkanga Secretariat

It was named for the former governor, Idongesit Nkanga.

Also called Akwa Ibom State Secretariat complex, it is the permanent administrative office of the Government of Akwa Ibom State, and hence houses the majority of the Ministries in Akwa Ibom State Civil Service. As of 2019 there are 26 Ministries in Idongesit Nkanga Secretariat, with 5826 female civil servants.
