= Government of Akwa Ibom State =

Executive, legislative and judicial branches of Akwa Ibom State, Nigeria

Akwa Ibom State Government
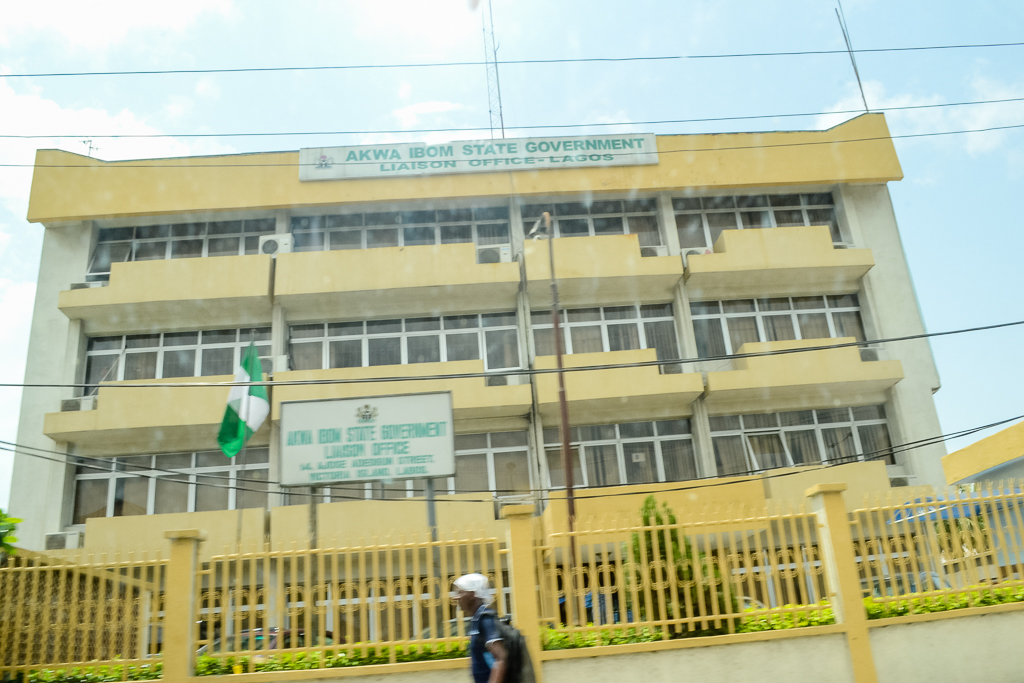
- Akwa Ibom State Government Liaison Office Lagos

Overview
- Established: 1987
- State: Akwa Ibom

Akwa Ibom State Government is the government of Akwa Ibom, Nigeria, concerned with the administration of the state ministries. The government consists of Executive, Legislative and Judiciary. The government was headed by Udom Gabriel Emmanuel, as of 2023, who is the policy-maker and often assisted by the commissioners and other civil servants of the state.

== Office Of The Governor Of Akwa Ibom State ==
The Office of the Governor was created along with the creation of the State in 1987. And is currently headed by Mr. Udom Gabriel Emmanuel who is the 10th Governor of the State. This Office is responsible for the effective coordination of all government activities for the good people of the State.

== Judiciary ==
The Judiciary is one of the three co-equal arms of the Akwa Ibom State Government concerned with the interpretation of the laws of Akwa Ibom State government. The judiciary is headed by the Chief Judge Of Akwa Ibom State, appointed by the Akwa Ibom State Governor with the approval of the Akwa Ibom State House Of Assembly Distinguish members of the Judiciary include the Attorney-General and Akwa Ibom State Commissioner for Justice as well as the Chief Registrar. The Chief Registrar serves as the head of administration and accountant to the judiciary.

== Courts ==
The Akwa Ibom State courts consists of three levels of courts. The high court, an appellate court that operates under discretionary review, meaning that the Court can choose which cases to hear, by granting of writs of certiorari. It is the court of last resort. Other levels of the court include the Magistrates and the Customary Court. In addition to the court, the Judiciary also consists of a Judicial Service Commission which statutory duties include the promotion and appointment of judicial staffs as well as other disciplinary function. The Chief Judge serves as the commission's chairman.

== See also ==
- Akwa Ibom State
- Commissioner for Local Government
- Federalism in Nigeria
