= Udom Gabriel Emmanuel =

Nigerian politician (born 1966)

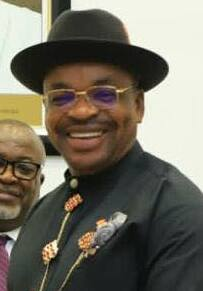

Governor of Akwa Ibom State
- In office 29 May 2015 – 29 May 2023
- Deputy: Moses Ekpo
- Preceded by: Godswill Akpabio
- Succeeded by: Umo Eno

Personal details
- Born: 11 July 1966 (age 60) Awa Iman, Onna, Eastern Region, Nigeria (now in Akwa Ibom State)
- Party: Peoples Democratic Party
- Spouse: Martha Udom
- Parent: Gabriel Emmanuel Nkenang
- Education: University of Lagos; London Business School; INSEAD, France
- Website: udomlegacyofimpact.com

Udom Gabriel Emmanuel (born 11 July 1966) is a Nigerian politician and accountant who served as governor of Akwa Ibom State from 2015 to 2023. He contested for the office of governor in the April 2015 elections on the platform of Peoples Democratic Party.

== Early life and career ==
Udom Gabriel Emmanuel was born on 11 July 1966, into the family of Ette Gabriel Emmanuel Nkanang, a native of Awa Iman in Onna Local Government, Akwa Ibom State, Nigeria. He rose from being a Sunday school leader at United Evangelical Church (QIC) (formerly Qua Iboe Church) to become a bank director. Emmanuel and his family are strong members of United Evangelical Church (QIC), Nigeria.

Emmanuel served as an audit manager of Price Waterhouse Coopers. He is an associate of the Chartered Institute of Taxation of Nigeria. He served as chief financial officer of Zenith Bank Plc.

Emmanuel also served as group head of Income Optimization, Financial Control & Strategic Planning Department at Zenith Bank.

He served as general manager of Zenith Bank Plc. He joined Zenith in 1996 from Diamond Bank Limited and was the pioneer manager of its Lagos Central Branch. He was in charge of the Telecommunications Sector, Income Optimization and Financial & Strategic Planning Group of Zenith Bank Plc. He has over seventeen years financial services experience. He served as an executive director of Zenith Bank Plc.

He is a Chartered Accountant and he trained with Price Water house Coopers. He is a Fellow of the Nigerian Institute of Management. He has attended the Advanced Management Programme at INSEAD, France. Udom holds a bachelor's degree in accounting from the University of Lagos in 1988.

== Education ==
Emmanuel holds a bachelor's degree in accounting from the University of Lagos in 1988. He is a Fellow of the Nigerian Institute of Management. He has attended the Advanced Management Program at INSEAD, France.

He attended School of Arts and Science, Uyo, Akwa Ibom State and obtained Advanced Certificate of Basic Studies (CBS) and Higher School Certificate (HSC)

Udom attended Secondary Commercial School, Ikot Akpan Ishiet, Onna LGA of Akwa Ibom State.

== Appointments and politics ==
In July 2013, Emmanuel was appointed secretary to the State Government of Akwa Ibom State.

In 2014, Emmanuel contested for the governorship of Akwa Ibom State in a primary election and defeated 22 other aspirants to emerge the candidate of the Akwa Ibom State People's Democratic Party (PDP).

In 2015, Emmanuel was elected Governor of Akwa Ibom State, Nigeria. He contested under the platform of the People's Democratic Party (PDP), he won with 999,071 votes to defeat APC's candidate Umana Okon Umana who scored 89,865 votes of the All Progressive Congress and was declared elected by the Independent National Electoral Commission (INEC).

In the 9 March 2019 Akwa Ibom State gubernatorial election Emmanuel was re-elected as Governor of Akwa Ibom State defeating 44 other candidates in the election. He polled 519,712 votes as against that of his closest rival Nsima Ekere of the All Progressive Congress party who had 171,978 votes. And while in office he adopted Tupocracy system of government.

== Corruption allegations ==
=== 2019 Accountant-General report ===
In 2020, the Accountant-General of Akwa Ibom State released the state's annual report of audited financial statements for 2019. Questions were raised based on the reported expenses of Emmanuel along with those of his administration. Further scrutiny revealed potential corruption and led to calls for reform in budgetary processes. Originally, Emmanuel's Commissioner for Finance Nsikan Linus Nkan stated that there was nothing unusual about the budget overruns, claiming overruns are common but folding when enquired about the questionable Toyota purchases, saying there could have been an "error somewhere." The day after a full investigative article on the budget irregularities was published by the International Centre for Investigative Reporting, Nkan along with Commissioner for Economic Development and Ibom Deep Seaport Akan Okon, Commissioner for Information and Strategy Ini Ememobong, and Accountant General Uwem Andrew-Essien arranged a press conference where they claimed that the budget overruns and questionable expenses were due to coding errors in International Public Sector Accounting Standards software. Okon said that the software was new to his office and "there was no extra-budgetary expenditure by the government," however, reporting showed that Akwa Ibom had been using IPSAS software since 2014, the Office of the Accountant General had spent ₦132 million on IPSAS training and procurement, and the Nigerian Governors’ Forum rated Akwa Ibom in the top five states for IPSAS adoption in 2020.

==== Cars ====
The report stated that the office of the Secretary to the State Government had bought 15 new Toyota Prados for ₦4.864 billion. Not only was the approved car budget only ₦738 million, when checked by reporters from International Centre for Investigative Reporting, the 15 new cars should have only cost in the range of ₦510 million to ₦612 million. Emmanuel's SSG, Emmanuel Ekuwem, did not respond to a Freedom of Information request from ICIR about the inflated amount supposedly spent on the cars.

==== Airplane ====
Another questionable expense from the report was the ₦5.04 billion spent on the maintenance of the governor's plane, a Bombardier Global 5000. Like with the car expenses, the plane maintenance was far over budget, which was only ₦2.5 billion. Another similarity with the car expenses was the vastly inflated costs compared to market prices as reporting showed that the cost of maintaining a Bombardier Global 5000 rarely exceeds ₦800 million and that the annual maintenance costs of the entire presidential air fleet was only ₦1.4 billion. Ekuwem also did not respond to a Freedom of Information request from ICIR about the inflated amount supposedly spent on the airplane maintenance.

==== Fuel and Lubricants ====
The report stated that ₦2.7 billion was spent on fuel and lubricants for the generators and cars of Emmanuel, the first family, and his appointees in 2019. Only ₦1.3 billion had been allocated for the budget line and reporting suggested that the actual annual costs of fuel should have been less than ₦700 million.

==== Pilgrims Welfare Board ====
Another questionable budget line were the expenses of the Akwa Ibom State Pilgrims Welfare Board which had ₦9 million allocated to it for the production of "security encoded ID cards" and ₦15 million allocated for public orientation seminars; ₦120 million and ₦25 million were spent, respectively. Further investigation revealed that the public seminar was held at a Church owned by Chairman of the Board Cletus Bassey while Secretary of the Board Nsikak-Abasi Nnam-Okuo Orok appeared unaware that the money had been spent, stating "[the Board] never even applied for the production of any ID" and "I think something is wrong somewhere. We didn’t receive the said amount for public orientation."

==== Other budget overruns ====
According to the report:

- ₦800 million was allocated for Emmanuel's hospitality and traditional gifts but ₦1.18 billion was spent
- ₦12 billion was allocated for security services but ₦13.28 billion was spent
- ₦20 million was allocated for "tours and visits" but ₦46.95 million was spent
- ₦75 million was allocated for medical equipment for the Government House but ₦153 million was spent

=== Peacock Paints Limited failure ===
In 2015, Emmanuel announced the return of the partially state-owned Peacock Paints Limited public limited company, which had declined for years prior to the intervention, by having his administration renegotiate the company's debt, pay it off, before claiming to fully nationalize Peacock Paints and pumping ₦526 million of reactivation funds into the company. However, reports in 2021 showed that Peacock Paints had fallen to consecutive years of losses and salary nonpayment as mismanagement and corruption kneecapped the company. Much of the ₦526 million reactivation fund had been laundered by officials in the state Ministry of Trade and Investment while much of the money that actually got to Peacock Paints was also laundered, this time by Peacock Paints management through inflated purchases. The report also showed that the Emmanuel administration had not properly taken over the company causing financial records to still note the state government as holding a 15% stake in Peacock Paints. Emmanuel's Commissioner for Trade and Investment Ukpong Akpabio along with Peacock Paints management ignored Freedom of Information requests and further inquiries by reporters on the subject. After the release of a report on the company's collapse, the Akwa Ibom State Council of the Nigeria Union of Journalists called on the state government to address the company's crisis and the Akwa Ibom State House of Assembly announced that it would investigate the corruption allegations.

=== Ghost Project ===
Between 2015 and 2019, up to ₦13.61 billion was allocated and supposedly spent on "Government Special Development Project," an item under the budget for the Governor Emmanuel’s Office with no footprint or known project having been completed. ₦2.708 billion was spent for the "project" in 2015 (the first year of Emmanuel’s gubernatorial term) with ₦1.842b being spent in 2016, ₦3 billion being budgeted in 2017, ₦3 billion being spent in 2018, and ₦3.06 billion being spent in 2019. A Freedom of Information request from the International Centre for Investigative Reporting about the "project" was ignored by the Akwa Ibom State Government but Commissioner for Economic Development and Ibom Deep Seaport Akan Okon defended the government, saying that the "project" funds were used for "unforeseen events have to be taken care of" like security issues and that the President's office also had a "Government Special Development Project" budget item; Emmanuel repeated similar statements in a later press conference. However, review of the state budget showed "State Security Services Expenses" as the security funding source and review of the federal budget showed no presidential equivalent. Furthermore, a professor of finance at Federal University, Otuoke Emmanuel Bush claimed that even if the money was spent on emergencies, it would still constitute "misappropriation and misapplication of fund," which were "impeachable offences."

== Threatened demolition of critic's church ==
In August 2021, the Uyo Capital City Development Authority of the Akwa Ibom State Government marked the church of Holy Ghost Ambassadors Ministry International for demolition as the SSS brought in the church's senior pastor, Nyeneime Andy, for questioning. In a prior press conference, Andy had voiced opposition to Emmanuel's plan to dictate who the PDP nominated to succeed him in the 2023 gubernatorial election. The UCCDA claimed that the church building, built in 2012, did not meet the necessary planning standards for approval and gave a seven day ultimatum for its demolition. The demolition ultimately did not occur after Andy swiftly changed opinion post-detainment, posting on Facebook, "I call on the entire youth structures and the Sons of Faith to Support the Completion Agenda of Deacon Udom Emmanuel."

== EFCC Invitation (2025) ==
In March 2025, the Economic and Financial Crimes Commission (EFCC) invited former Governor Udom Emmanuel to their headquarters in Abuja. However there was no proof that the visit to EFCC was linked to multiple news reports that the investigation was initiated following a petition submitted in January 2025 by the Network Against Corruption and Trafficking (NACT. No official of the agency has confirmed the actual reason for the invite by the Agency.

As of March 2025, no formal charges had been filed against the former governor in relation to these allegations, and the EFCC had not released an official statement regarding the investigation.

== Awards ==
- On 18 March 2017 Udom Emmanuel was given the 2016 Leadership award for Best Governor of the Year.
- Nigeria sports Governor of the year award, November 2017.
- African industrial Development Award, 2022

== See also ==
- List of governors of Akwa Ibom State
