= Akwa Ibom State =

State of Nigeria

Akwa Ibom
- State
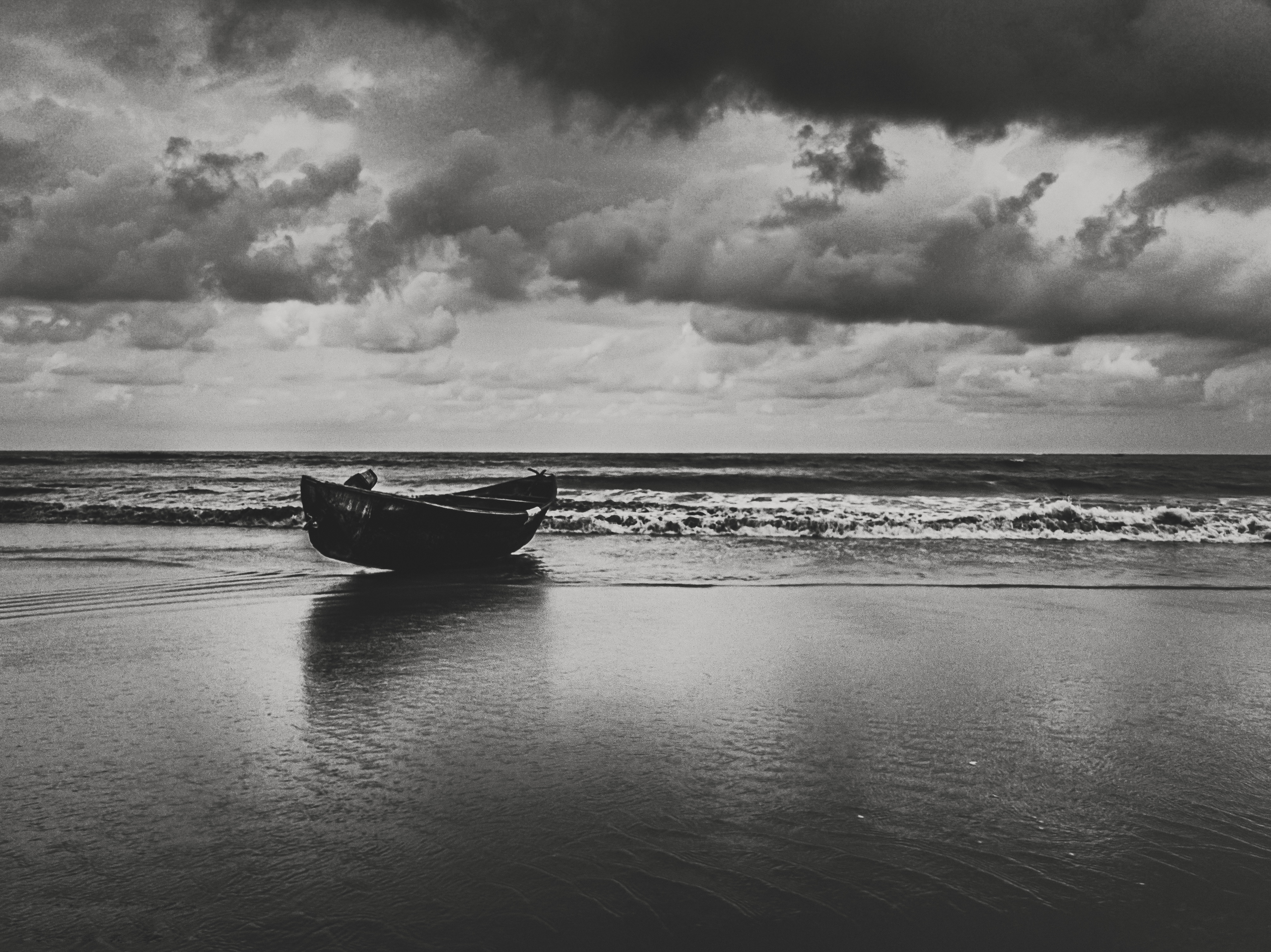
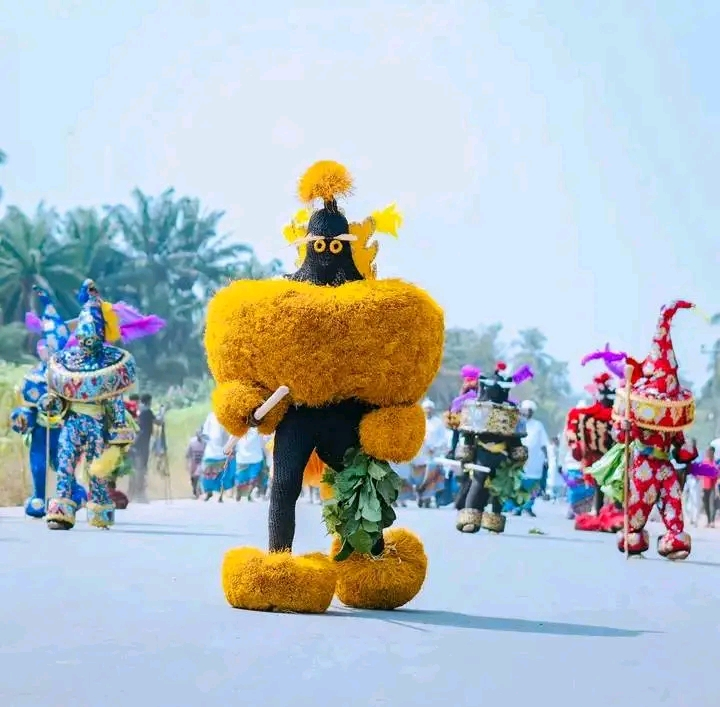
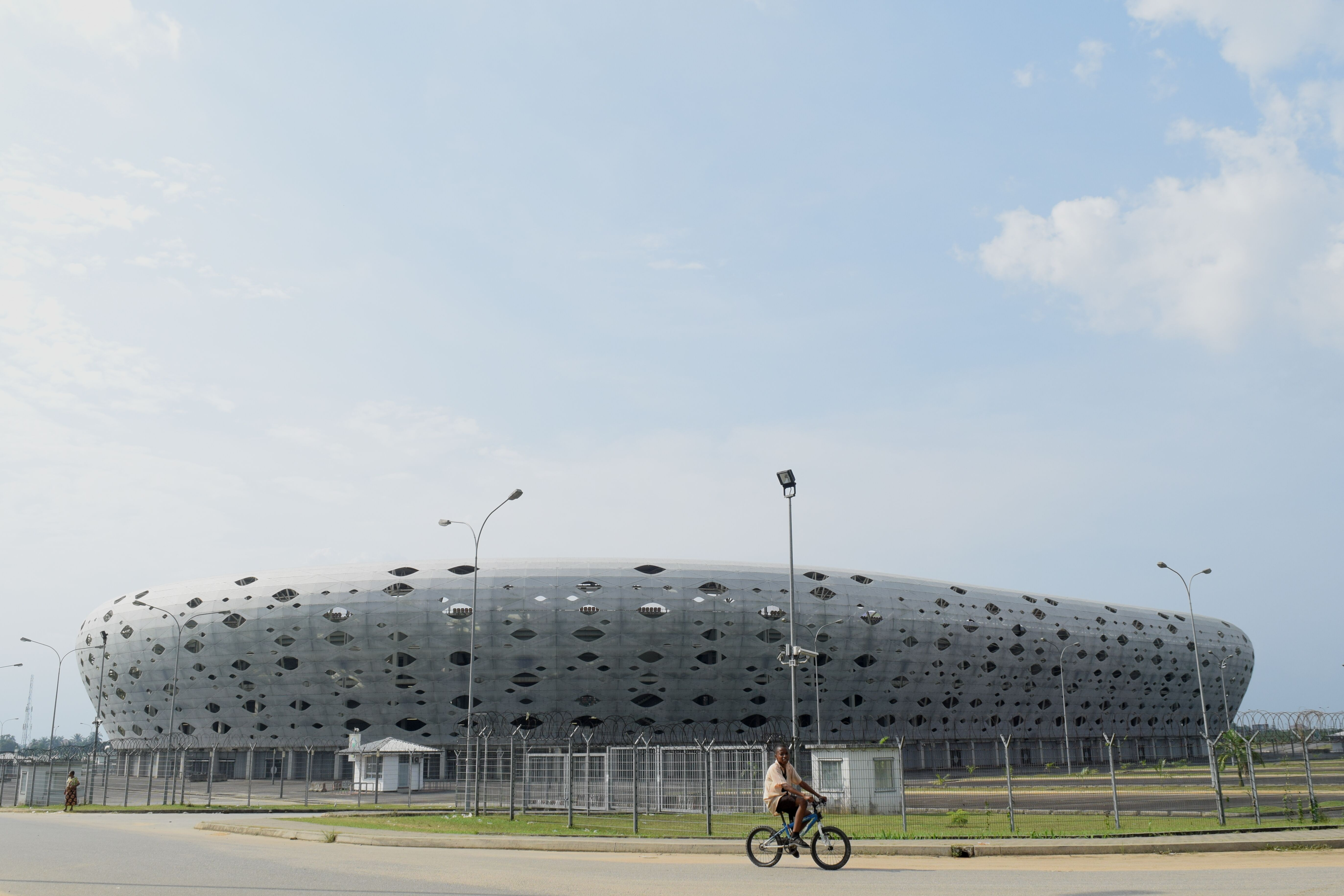
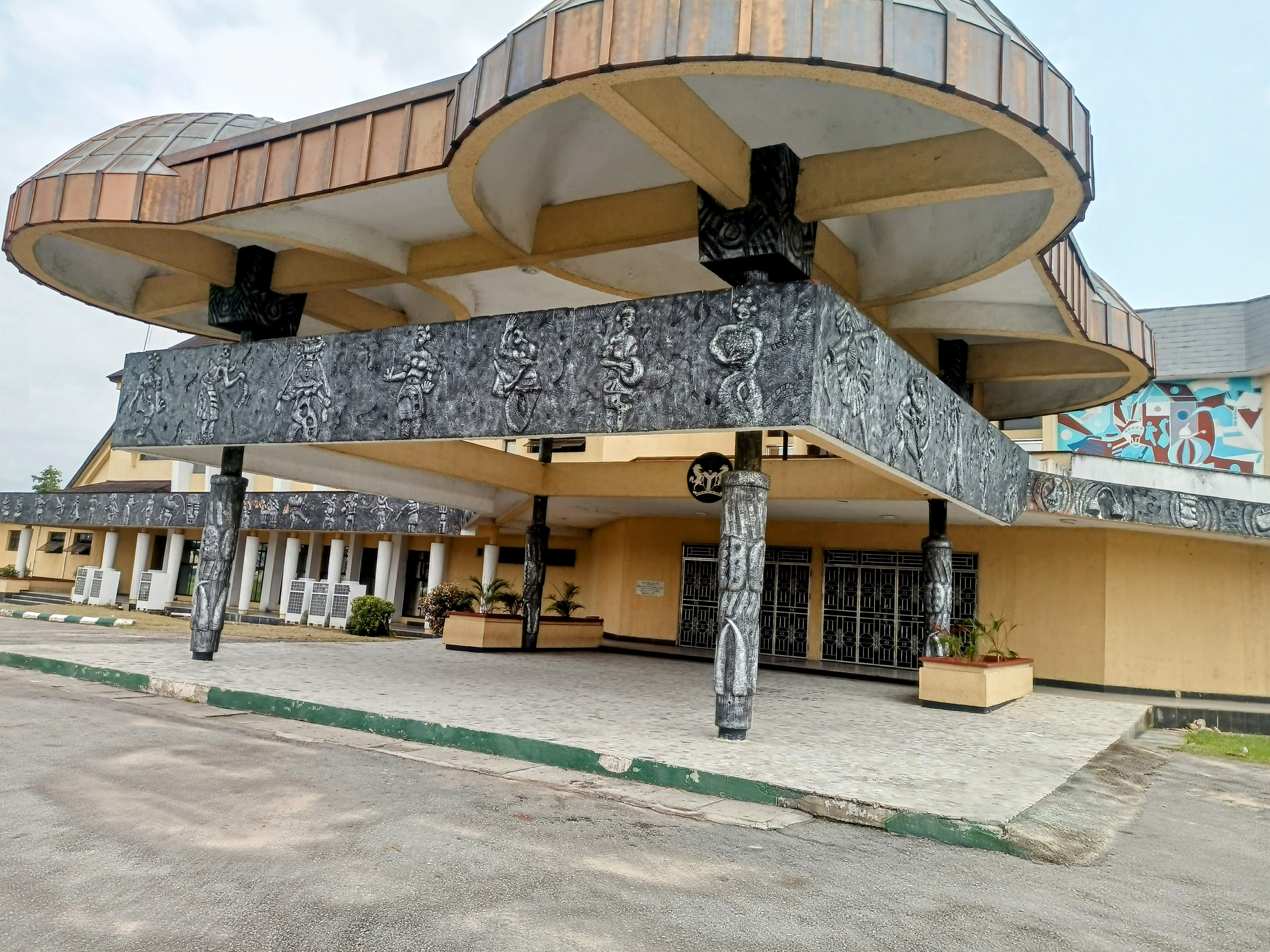
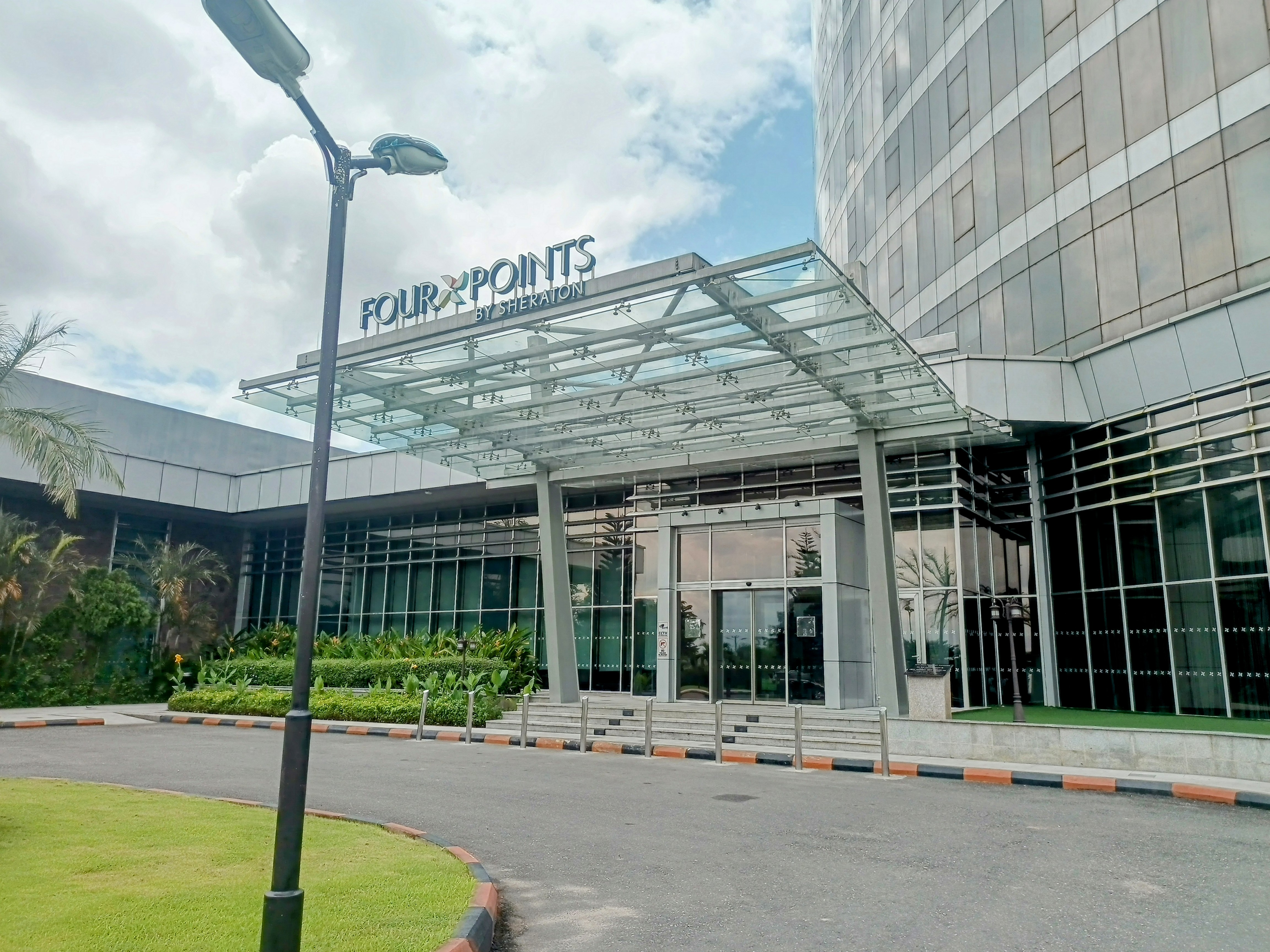
- Ibeno Beach Ekpe Masquerades Godswill Akpabio International Stadium Ibom Hall Four Points by Sheraton Hotel in Ikot Ekpene

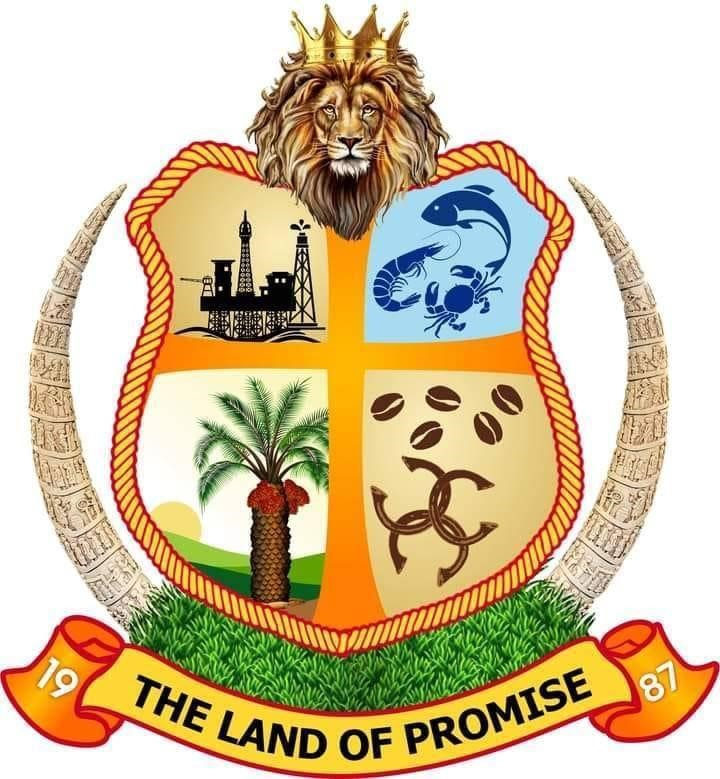
- Flag Seal
- Nicknames: Land of Promise, Akwa Abasi Ibom state
- Location of Akwa Ibom in Nigeria
- Coordinates: 05°00′N 07°50′E
- Country: Nigeria
- LGAs: 31
- Date created: 23 September 1987
- Capital: Uyo

Government
  - Body: Government of Akwa Ibom State
  - Governor: Umo Eno (APC)
  - Deputy Governor: Akon Eyakenyi
  - Legislature: Akwa Ibom State House of Assembly
  - Senators: NE: Aniekan Bassey (APC); NW: Godswill Akpabio (APC); S: Ekong Sampson (APC)
  - Representatives: List

Area
  - Total: 7,081 km^{2} (2,734 sq mi)
  - Rank: 30 of 36

Population (2016)
  - Total: 5,450,758
  - Rank: 15 of 36
  - Density: 769.8/km^{2} (1,994/sq mi)
- Demonym: Akwa Ibomite

GDP (PPP)
  - Year: 2021
  - Total: $50.30 billion 3rd of 36
  - Per capita: $7,739; 4th of 36
- Time zone: UTC+01 (WAT)
- Postal codes: 520211, 520212, 520221, 520222, 520231, 520232, 520241, 520251, 520261, 520271
- ISO 3166 code: NG-AK
- HDI (2022): 0.602 medium · 16th of 37
- Website: akwaibomstate.gov.ng

Akwa Ibom is a state in the South-South geopolitical zone of Nigeria. It borders Cross River State to the east, Rivers State and Abia State to the west and north-west, and the Atlantic Ocean to the south. The state takes its name from the Qua Iboe River which bisects the state before flowing into the Bight of Bonny. Akwa Ibom was split from Cross River State in 1987. The state has 31 local government areas, and its capital is Uyo.

Akwa Ibom has estimated population of over 8.5 million. Geographically, the state is divided between the Central African mangroves in the coastal far south and the Cross–Niger transition forests in the rest of the state. Other important geographical features are the Imo and Cross rivers which flow along Akwa Ibom's eastern and western borders respectively while the Kwa Ibo River bisects the state before flowing into the Bight of Bonny. In the southeast corner of the state is the Stubb Creek Forest Reserve, a heavily threatened wildlife reserve that contains declining crocodile, putty-nosed monkey, red-capped mangabey, and Sclater's guenon populations along with potentially extirpated populations of African leopard and Nigeria-Cameroon chimpanzee. Offshore, the state is also biodiverse as there are large fish populations alongside various cetacean species, including bottlenose dolphins, pantropical spotted dolphins, humpback whales, and killer whales.

Modern-day Akwa Ibom State has been inhabited by various ethnic groups for hundreds of years, primarily the closely related Ibibio, Annang, and Oron peoples in the North-East, North-West, and Southern zones of the state, respectively.

Economically, Akwa Ibom State is based around the production of crude oil and natural gas as highest oil-producing state in the country. Key minor industries involve agriculture as the state has substantial cocoyam, yam, and plantain crops along with fishing and heliciculture. Despite its vast oil revenues, Akwa Ibom has the seventeenth highest Human Development Index in the country in large part due to years of systemic corruption.

== Economy ==
Akwa Ibom State's economy is based on the production of crude oil and natural gas. It produces the most oil of any state in the country. It includes the following oil- producing Local Government Areas: Esit Eket, Eket, Onna, Mkpat Enin, Ikot Abasi, Ibeno, Mbo, and Eastern Obolo.

Key minor industries are based on agriculture; the state has substantial cocoyam, yam, and plantain crops, along with fishing and heliciculture.

Despite its vast oil revenues, Akwa Ibom ranks as seventeenth among the states List of Nigerian states by Human Development Index#2019 in the Human Development Index. Years of systemic corruption have resulted in such revenues being diverted from improving infrastructure, education and welfare of the people.

== Ethnicity ==
Akwa Ibom state is one of Nigeria's states with more than one distinct ethnic groups indigenous to it. Some may argue that majority of these indigenous languages are closely related, however, they are mainly different groups of Ibibio, Annang. The majority of the people of Akwa Ibom however are related to the Efik people of Cross River State of Nigeria.

== Languages ==
"There are 20 languages spoken as first languages in Akwa Ibom State." However, comparing different sources show there are slightly over 20 languages. They are as follows (in alphabetical order) with the LGAs in which they are spoken:

- Annang - Abak, Essien Udim, Ikot Ekpene, Oruk-Anam, and Ukanafun LGAs
- Ebughu - Mbo and Oron LGAs
- Efai - Mbo LGA
- Efik - Itu, Oron, Uruan LGAs
- Ekid - Eket and Esit Eket LGAs
- Enwang - Mbo LGA
- Etebi - Esit Eket LGA
- Ibibio - Etinan, Ikono, Ini, Ikot Abasi, Itu, Mkpat Enin, Nsit Atai, Nsit-Ubium, Onna, Uruan and Uyo LGAs.
- Ibino (Ibọnọ) - Ibeno LGA
- Ibuoro - Ikono and Itu LGAs
- Idere - Itu LGA
- Ika - Ika LGA
- Iko - Eastern Obolo LGA
- Ilue - Oron LGA
- Itu Mbon Uso - Ikono and Itu LGAs
- Iwerre - Ini LGA
- Nkari - Ini and Ikono LGA
- Obolo (Andoni) - Eastern Obolo and Ibeno LGAs
- Okobo - Okobo LGA
- Oro - Oron LGA
- Uda - Mbo LGA

One research however claims to "have identified just about 10 languages," claiming that some languages are dialects of others, though the criteria for classification as dialects is not clearly stated.

== History ==
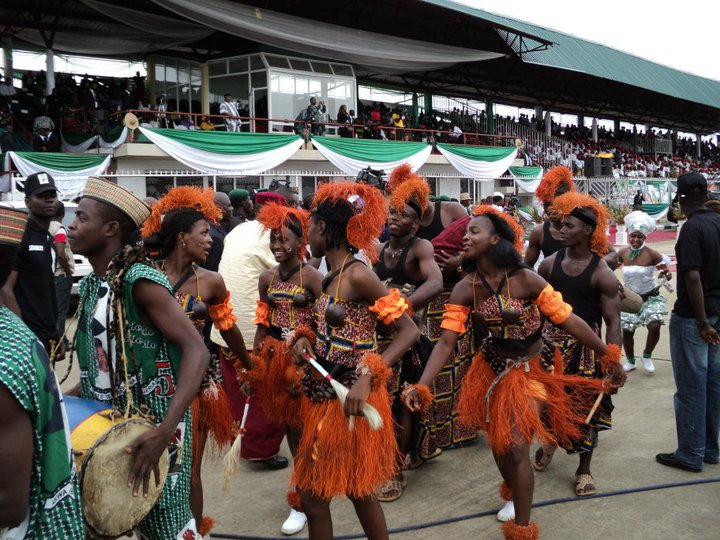
Dancers in Akwa Ibom traditional attire

In the pre-colonial period, what is now Akwa Ibom State was divided into various city-states like the Ibom Kingdom and Akwa Akpa before they later became a British protectorate in 1884 as a part of the Oil Rivers Protectorate. Prior to the British colonization, no central government had existed among the people of what is now Akwa Ibom State. The various ethnic peoples were largely organized into clan communities, based on kinship and relations.

Several Scottish missionaries went to Calabar in 1848, and Ibono in 1887. The British government did not attempt to establish more control over the area until 1904. In that year, they organized the Enyong Division, encompassing the area of the current state of Akwa Ibom, with headquarters at Ikot Ekpene, a predominately Annang city. Noted Africanist Kaanan Nair, noted this city as the cultural and political capital of the Annang people. The creation of Enyong Division encouraged collaboration among the numerous minority ethnic groups in the area. They created the Ibibio Welfare Union, later renamed Ibibio State Union. This social organization was first established as a local development and improvement forum for educated African persons and groups who in 1929 were still excluded from the colonial administration. It was dominated by British colonists and their appointees.

In the early 1900s, the British actually gained formal control of the area before incorporating the protectorate (now renamed the Niger Coast Protectorate) into the Southern Nigeria Protectorate which later merged into British Nigeria; after the merger, much of modern-day Akwa Ibom became a centre of anti-colonial resistance during the Women's War and political activism through the Ibibio State Union.

After independence in 1960, the area of now-Akwa Ibom was a part of the post-independence Eastern Region until 1967 when the region was split and the area became part of the South-Eastern State. Less than two months afterwards, the Igbo-majority former Eastern Region attempted to secede as the state of Biafra; in the three-year long Nigerian Civil War, now-Akwa Ibom was hard-fought over in the prelude to the Invasion of Port Harcourt while people from Akwa Ibom were persecuted by the Biafran forces as they were mainly non-Igbos. At the war's end and the reunification of Nigeria, the South-Eastern State was reformed until 1976 when it was renamed Cross River State.

Eleven years later, Cross River State was divided on 23 September 1987, by the Military Administration of General Ibrahim Badamosi Babangida.

This division resulted in the creation of the state of Akwa Ibom, Uyo was chosen as the state capital in order to encourage development in all regions of the state.

== Climate ==
Akwa Ibom has a tropical monsoon climate (Classification: Am) and is 42.58 metres (139.7 feet) above sea level. The city's average annual temperature is -0.99% lower than Nigeria's averages at 28.47 °C (83.25 °F). 342.56 millimetres (13.49 inches) of precipitation and 275 rainy days (75.34% of the time) are typical annual totals for Akwa Ibom.

The Akwa Ibom region regularly has tropical monsoons. All year long, there are high temperatures and a lot of rain. The average humidity is 80% and the UV-index is 7. It is dry for 90 days of the year.

The climate of Akwa Ibom is tropical with significant rainfall and a short dry season.

== Government ==
Politics in Akwa Ibom State are dominated by the three main ethnic groups: the Ibibio, Annang, and Oro. Of these three, the Ibibio remain the majority and have held sway in the state since its creation.

=== Ministries, Departments and Agencies ===
The list of ministries in Akwa Ibom State include the following:

- Akwa Ibom State Ministry of Justice
- Akwa Ibom State Ministry of Agriculture and Food Sufficiency
- Akwa Ibom State Ministry of Account and Finance
- Akwa Ibom State Ministry of Works
- Akwa Ibom State Ministry of Education
- Akwa Ibom State Ministry of Environment
- Akwa Ibom State Ministry of Transport & Petroleum Resources
- Akwa Ibom State Ministry of Local Government and Chieftaincy Affairs
- Akwa Ibom State Ministry of Lands, Town Planning & Survey
- Akwa Ibom State Ministry of Information & Strategy
- Akwa Ibom State Ministry of Health
- Akwa Ibom State Ministry of Science & Technology
- Akwa Ibom State Ministry of Women Development and Social Development
- Akwa Ibom State Ministry of Youth & Sports
- Akwa Ibom State Ministry of Administration & Supplies
- Akwa Ibom State Ministry of Economic Development Labour and Manpower Planning
- Akwa Ibom State Ministry of Investment, Commerce and Industries
- Akwa Ibom State Ministry of Culture and Tourism
- Akwa Ibom State Bureau of Political/Legislative Affairs and Water Resources
- Akwa Ibom State Bureau of Rural Development & Cooperatives
- Akwa Ibom State Ministry of Power and Petroleum Resources
- Akwa Ibom state Ministry of Internal Security and Water ways

== Local Government Areas ==
Akwa Ibom State consists of thirty-one (31) local government areas. They include:

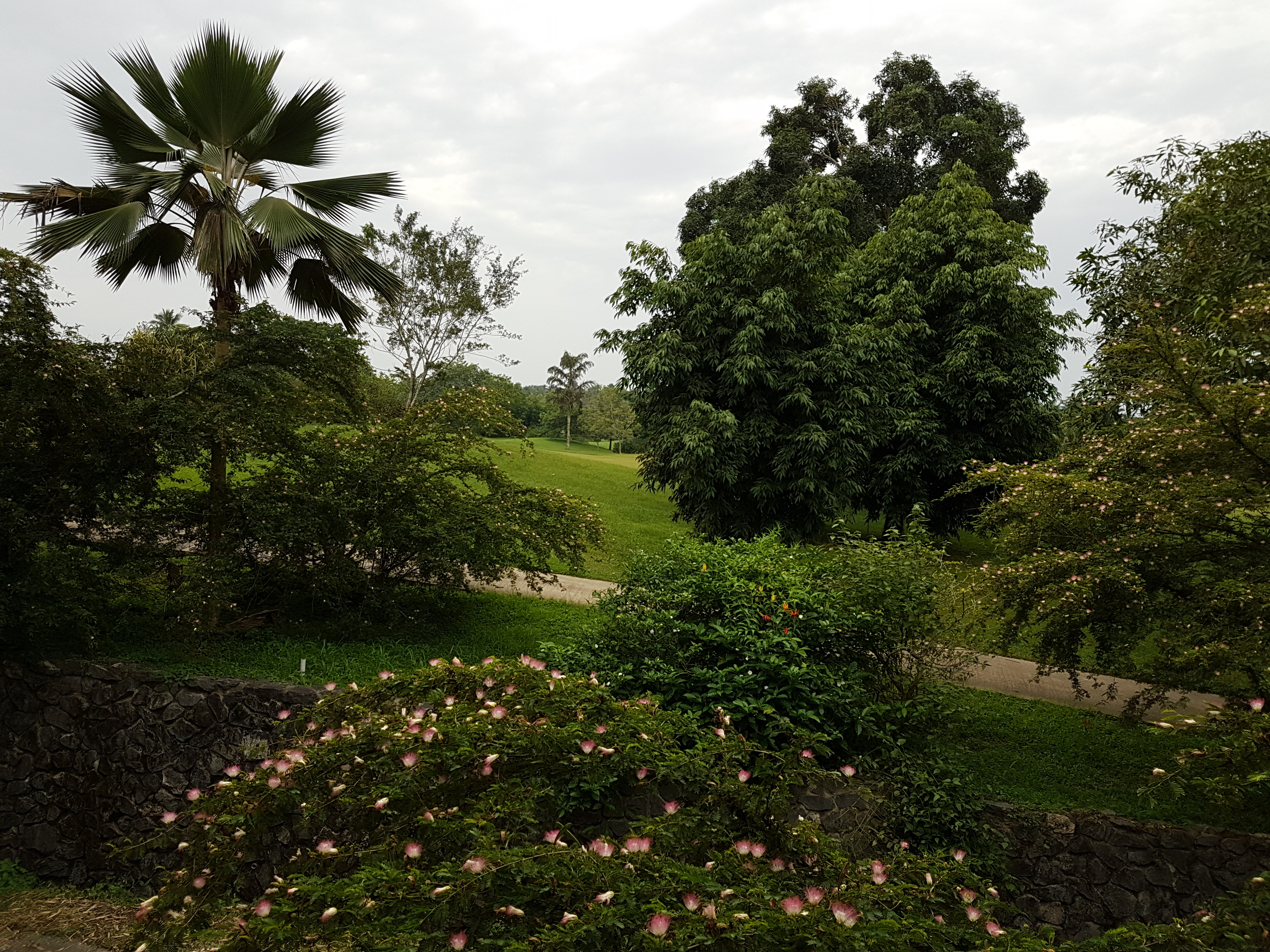
Meridien Akwa Ibom park

- Abak
- Eastern Obolo
- Eket
- Esit-Eket
- Essien Udim
- Etim-Ekpo
- Etinan
- Ibeno
- Ibesikpo-Asutan
- Ibiono-Ibom
- Ika
- Ikono
- Ikot Abasi
- Ikot Ekpene
- Ini
- Itu
- Mbo
- Mkpat-Enin
- Nsit-Atai
- Nsit-Ibom
- Nsit-Ubium
- Obot-Akara
- Okobo
- Onna
- Oron
- Oruk Anam
- Ukanafun
- Udung-Uko
- Uruan
- Urue-Offong/Oruko
- Uyo

== Demographics ==
=== Ethnic groups ===
The main ethnic groups of the state include: Ibibio, Anaang, Ekid and Oro.

=== Religion ===
The people of Akwa Ibom are predominantly Christians.

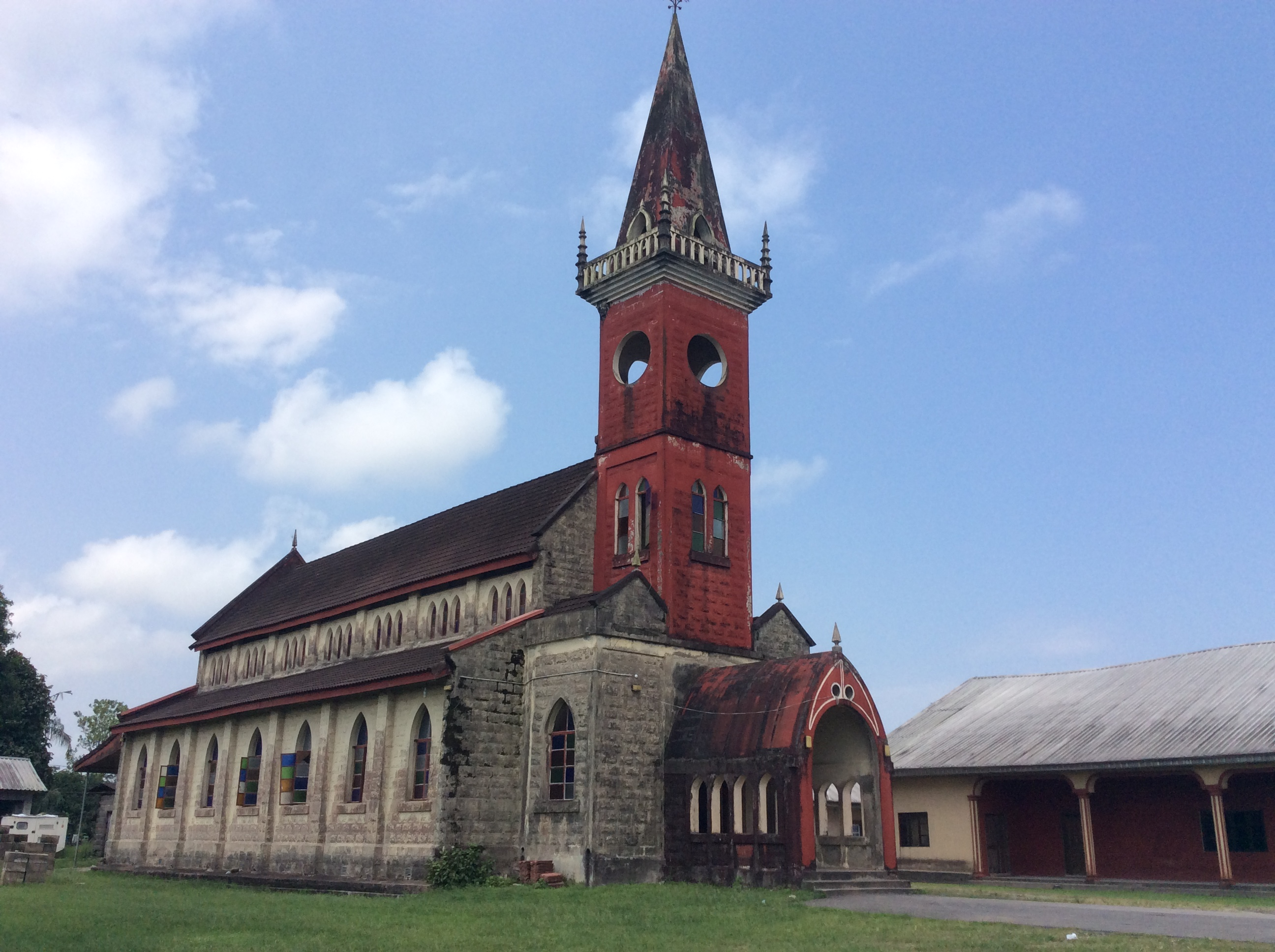
Pioneer Qua Iboe Church Ibeno, Akwa Ibom State

There is a combined total of 976,791 Catholics as of 2020 in the two dioceses of Uyo with 74 parishes under Bishop John Ebebe Ayah and Ikot Ekpene with 53 parishes under Bishop Camillus Raymond Umoh, both suffragans of the Archdiocese of Calabar.

The Bishop of the Anglican Diocese of Uyo within the Church of Nigeria is Prince Asukwo Antai (2014).

=== Languages ===
Like their Efik neighbors of Cross River State, people of Akwa Ibom speak various dialects of the Ibibio-Efik languages, which belong to the Benue–Congo language family, forming part of the Niger–Congo group of languages.

The following table lists languages of Akwa Ibom State, and the local government areas in which they are spoken:

Language	LGA(s) spoken in
Anaang	Abak, Essien Udim, Ika, Ikot Ekpene, Oruk-Anam, Ukanafun, Etim Ekpo, Obot Akara.
Obolo	Eastern Obolo
Ekid	Eket, Esit Eket
Etebi	Esit Eket
Ibibio	Etinan, Ibiono Ibom, Ikono, Ikot Abasi, Itu, Ibesikpo-Asutan, Mkpat Enin, Nsit Atai, Nsit-Ibom, Nsit-Ubium, Onna, Uruan, Uyo, Ini.
Ibuno	Ibeno
Ika Oku	Ika
Nkari	Ini
Itu Mbon Uso	Ini
Idere	Itu
Efik	Itu, Uruan
Ebughu	Mbo, Oron
Efai	Mbo
Enwan	Mbo
Oro	Mbo, Oron, Udung Uko, Urue-Offong-Oruko
Iko	Eastern Obolo
Okobo	Okobo
Ilue	Oron
Khana	Oruk-Anam

== Education ==
The Akwa Ibom State Ministry of Education is tasked with monitoring the education sector of the state.

The current part of Akwa Ibom State that was within the former Calabar Kingdom, was the first site of Western education in Nigeria. The Hope Waddell Training Institute was founded at Calabar in 1895, and the Methodist Boys' High School, Oron in 1905. Other top schools, such as the Catholic seminaries Holy Family College at Abak and Regina Coeli College in Essene, were also soon founded.

Some educational institutes in the state today are:

- Akwa Ibom State Polytechnic Ikot Osurua
- Akwa Ibom State University (Oruk Anam LGA and Mkpat Enin LGA)
- Federal Polytechnic, Ukana
- Foundation College of Technology Ikot Ekpene
- Heritage Polytechnic, Eket
- Maritime Academy of Nigeria, Oron
- Obong University, Obong Ntak
- Ritman University
- University of Uyo, Uyo
- Federal University of Technology, Ikot Abasi
- Federal College of Education Ididep, Ibiono
- School of Basic Studies, Abak
- School of Nursing, Uyo, Eket, Oron, Ikot Ekpene, Etinan
- Sure Polytechnic, Ukanafun
- Topfaith University, Mkpatak
- Trinity Polytechnic, Uyo
- Uyo City Polytechnic Nduetong Oku

== Transportation ==
Federal highways

- A342 east from Aba (Abia State) via Uyo to Oron,
- A4-1 east from A342 at Utu Ikot Ekpenyong to Cross River as the Ekot Ekpene-Calabar Rd.

Other major highways include:

- the Ikot Akan-Deyor Chara Rd across the Imo River at Kalaoko to Rivers State,
- the Nto Obo-Obon Ebot Rd west to Abia State at Azumini,
- the Umuahia Rd north from A342 at Ikot Ekpene to Abia.

Airports:

Victor Attah International Airport (2009) 24 km southeast of Uyo has services to Abuja and Lagos, and Eket Airstrip for domestic flights. Ibom Air maintains its hub at this airport.

== Notable people ==
- Senator Godswill Akpabio, former governor of Akwa Ibom State, former Senate Minority Leader, Senate President (2023-)
- Godwin Akpan Amaowoh a clergy, researcher and inventor
- Obong Victor Attah, former governor of Akwa Ibom State
- Hilda Baci, known for breaking the Guinness World Record for longest cooking marathon.
- Nathaniel Bassey is a Nigerian gospel music minister and RCCG Pastor from Uyo L.G.A, in Akwa Ibom state.
- Moses Bliss, is a Nigerian gospel singer, worship leader and songwriter.
- Bnxn, Daniel Etiese Benson (born 14 May 1997), known professionally as Bnxn (pronounced as Benson) and formerly known as Buju, is a Nigerian Afro-fusion singer, songwriter and record producer.
- Effiong Dickson Bob
- Ini Edo, Nollywood Actress
- Emem Aniekanabasi Alban is a Nigerian agronomist, entrepreneur, and humanitarian
- Inibehe Effiong, a human rights lawyer, activist, social commentator, and litigation lawyer.
- Obong Ufot Ekaette, secretary to the Government of the Federal Republic of Nigeria from 1999 to 2007 under President Olusegun Obasanjo
- Dominic Ekandem first cardinal in English-speaking West Africa. First Nigerian Cardinal to qualify as a candidate to the papacy.
- Senator (Engr.) Chris Ekpenyong Former deputy governor of Akwa Ibom State in the Victor Attah administration and former Senator representing Akwa Ibom North-West Senatorial District in the 9th Assembly.
- Engr. Patrick Ekpotu, former Deputy Governor of Akwa Ibom State
- Udom Gabriel Emmanuel, former Governor of Akwa Ibom State
- Senator Ita Enang, Senior Special Assistant (Niger-Delta) to President Muhammadu Buhari
- Vincent Enyeama, professional footballer (Goalie) and former Super Eagle captain
- Mark Essien, entrepreneur and founder of Hotels.ng
- Christy Essien-Igbokwe, a musician and actress* Chief Donald Etiebet, former Minister of Petroleum
- Nse Ikpe-Etim, Nollywood actress
- Eve Esin, Nollywood actress
- Etim Inyang, former Inspector General of the Nigerian Police Force (I.G.P) 1985 to 1986
- Emmanuel Iren founder of Celebration Church International
- Obong Akpan Isemin, elected governor of Akwa Ibom State in Nigeria from January 1992 to November 1993 during the Nigerian Third Republic
- Clement Isong, second governor of the Central Bank of Nigeria; first civilian governor of the former Cross River State
- Emem Isong, multi-award-winning filmmaker and CEO of Royal Arts Academy
- David Obongekong David, is a Nigerian researcher, educator
- Young Jonn, John Saviours Udomboso known professionally as young Jonn is a Nigerian singer, songwriter and record producer.
- Rt. Hon. Onofiok Luke, the 11th Speaker of the Akwa Ibom State House of Assembly and the Pioneer Speaker of the Nigeria Youth Parliament
- Group Capt. Idongesit Nkanga, former military governor of Akwa Ibom State
- Samuel Peter, world heavyweight boxing champion
- William Troost-Ekong, is a professional footballer who plays as a centre-back for Super League Greece club PAOK
- Egbert Udo Udoma, from Ikot Abasi, former chief justice of Uganda
- Ime Bishop Umoh, Nollywood actor
- Professor Okon Uya was briefly chairman of the National Electoral Commission of Nigeria (NECON), appointed by President Ibrahim Babangida after the presidential elections of 12 June 1993 had been annulled and his predecessor Humphrey Nwosu dismissed.
- Elizabeth Shoyemi, Executive Director Centre for Population Health Initiatives (CPHI)

== Politics ==
The State government is led by a democratically elected governor who works closely with the state House of Assembly. The capital city of the state is Uyo.

=== Electoral system ===
The electoral system of each state is selected using a modified two-round system. To be elected in the first round, a candidate must receive the plurality of the vote and over 25% of the vote in at least two-thirds of the State local government Areas. If no candidate passes the threshold, a second round will be held between the top candidate and the next candidate to have received a plurality of votes in the highest number of local government Areas.

== See also ==
- Akwa Ibom State Ministry of Education
- List Of Government Ministries Of Akwa Ibom State
- Ibom Air
