= List of governors of Akwa Ibom State =

Governor of Akwa Ibom State
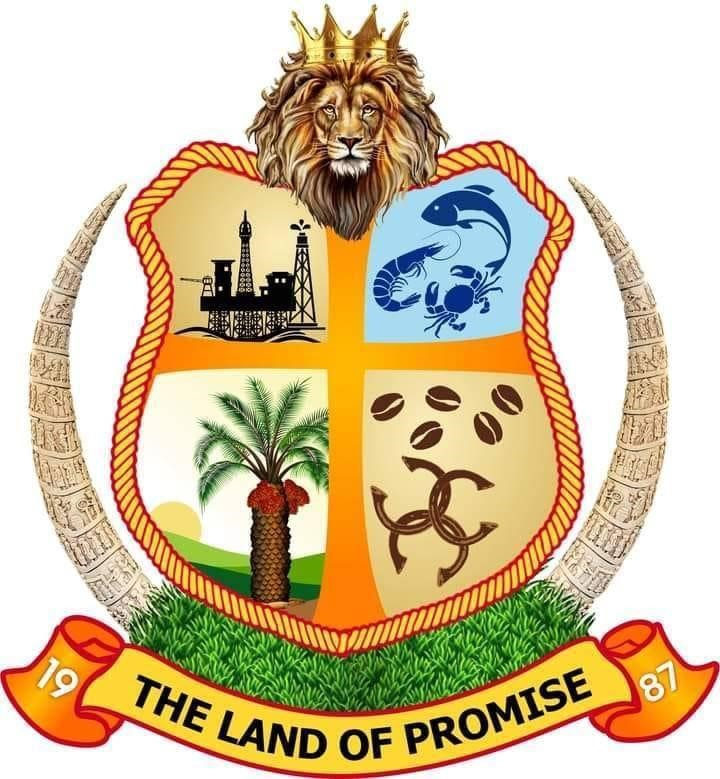
- Seal of Akwa Ibom State of Nigeria

- Flag of Akwa Ibom State of Nigeria
- Incumbent; Umo Eno since May 2023
- Government of Akwa Ibom State
- Style: Governor (informal); His Excellency or Your Excellency (courtesy)
- Member of: Executive Council of Akwa Ibom State
- Reports to: President of Nigeria
- Residence: Government House, Uyo
- Seat: Uyo
- Appointer: Popular vote
- Term length: Four years, renewable once consecutively
- Constituting instrument: Constitution of Nigeria
- Inaugural holder: Akpan Isemin
- Formation: January 1992
- Deputy: Deputy governor of Akwa Ibom State

Location of Akwa Ibom State in Nigeria

Akwa Ibom State, located in the South South geopolitical zone of Nigeria, has been governed by a succession of military governors, administrators, and elected governors since its creation in 1987. Before 1987, it formed part of the Eastern Region until the military dissolved Nigeria's regional structure in 1967. (Note: Nigeria's regional system of government was a decentralised political structure where the country was divided into autonomous regions—each with its own legislature, executive, and judiciary—allowing them to govern internal affairs and manage resources independently, while still operating under a central federal authority.) Following the reorganisation, the area became part of the newly created South-Eastern State on 27 May 1967. The South-Eastern State, comprising the present-day states of Akwa Ibom and Cross River, remained under military rule until Nigeria's brief civilian transition in 1979. In 1976, under the Murtala Mohammed administration, South-Eastern State was renamed Cross River State.

For over a decade, the region that would become Akwa Ibom was administered as part of Cross River State. The military government of Ibrahim Babangida created Akwa Ibom State on 23 September 1987, carving it out from the southeastern portion of Cross River State. Upon its creation, Akwa Ibom was governed by military administrators, starting with Tunde Ogbeha (1987–1988), followed by Godwin Abbe (1988–1990), and Idongesit Nkanga (1990–1992). Nigeria's return to democratic rule in the short-lived Third Republic saw Akpan Isemin of the National Republican Convention (NRC) become the state's first elected civilian governor in January 1992. His administration was ended by the military coup of November 1993, after which the state reverted to military rule with Yakubu Bako, Joseph Adeusi, and John Ebiye as administrators.

The dawn of the Fourth Republic in 1999 ushered in an era of uninterrupted democratic governance in Akwa Ibom. Victor Attah of the Peoples Democratic Party (PDP) became governor and served two terms from 1999 to 2007. He was succeeded by Godswill Akpabio (2007–2015). Akpabio's successor, Udom Gabriel Emmanuel, also of the PDP, served from 2015 to 2023. In 2023, Umo Bassey Eno, also a PDP candidate, was elected governor and is the incumbent.

== List of governors ==
=== Eastern Region ===
Before Nigeria's independence in 1960, the territory that now constitutes Akwa Ibom State was part of the Eastern Region, one of the country's original administrative divisions. During the colonial era, British officials governed the Eastern Region, with Clement Pleass (1954–1956) and Robert Stapledon (1956–1960) serving as governors. After independence, Francis Akanu Ibiam (1960–1966) became the first Nigerian governor of the Eastern Region, while Michael Okpara served as its premier (1960–1966). However, following Nigeria's first military coup in January 1966, the military abolished the regional system, dismissed civilian premiers, and appointed military administrators, with Chukwuemeka Odumegwu Ojukwu governing the Eastern Region from January 1966 until its dissolution in May 1967. A premier was responsible for the region's executive functions. Administrators were usually appointed to rule a state when there is a political crisis or state of emergency.

=== South-Eastern State ===
Following Nigeria's restructuring under Yakubu Gowon in 1967, the Eastern Region was divided into three new states: East Central State, Rivers State, and South-Eastern State. South-Eastern State remained under military administration, with Uduokaha Esuene appointed as its first military governor (1967–1975). After the 1976 state reorganisation under Murtala Mohammed, the state was renamed Cross River State.

A military governor was the head of a state during Nigeria's military era, appointed by the head of the federal military government to administer states, as established by Decree No. 14 of 1967. He exercised executive powers on behalf of the central military government. In contrast, an executive governor is the democratically elected chief executive of a state under the 1999 Constitution, empowered to lead the state government, implement laws, and oversee public administration. The deputy governor is elected on the same ticket as the governor and serves as the second-in-command, assuming the governorship in the event of the governor's death, incapacitation, or resignation, and assisting in administrative duties as assigned.

Military governors of South-Eastern State
Governor		Term in office	Party
Portrait of Brigadier Udokaha Esuene in military uniform	Udokaha Esuene (b. 1936, d. 1993)	May 1967 – July 1975	Military governor
—	Paul Omu (b. 1940)	July 1975 – March 1976	Military governor

=== Cross River State ===
The post-renaming era continued under military rule, with Paul Omu (1976–1978) and Babatunde Elegbede (1978–1979) administering the state. Civilian rule was established briefly in 1979, bringing Clement Isong (1979–1983) of the National Party of Nigeria (NPN) to office, followed by Donald Etiebet in 1983. The December 1983 military coup ushered in another era of military control, with leaders such as Edet Archibong (1984), Dan Archibong (1984–1986), and Eben Ibim Princewill (1986–1989) governing the state.

Heads of the government of Cross River State
Governor		Term in office (Note: For elected governors, the month and year of their election into office/inauguration to the position is shown.)	Party	Election	D. Governor
—	Paul Omu (b. 1940)	March 1976 – July 1978	Military governor	—	Office did not exist
—	Babatunde Elegbede (b. 1939, d. 1994)	July 1978 – October 1979	Military governor	—	Office did not exist
Clement Isong wearing a traditional cap	Clement Isong (b. 1920, d. 2000)	October 1979 – October 1983	NPN	1979	Mathias Ofoboche
—	Donald Etiebet (b. 1934, d. 2015)	October 1983 – December 1983	NPN	1983	Fidelis Ikogo Nnang
—	Edet Akpan Archibong (b. 1930, d. 2015)	January 1984 – May 1984	Military governor	—	Office abolished
Dan Patrick Archibong on military uniform	Dan Patrick Archibong (b. 1943, d. 1990)	May 1984 – 1986	Military governor	—	Office abolished
—	Eben Ibim Princewill (b. 1946)	1986 – December 1989	Military governor	—	Office abolished

=== Akwa Ibom State ===
Akwa Ibom State was created on 23 September 1987 by the military government of Ibrahim Babangida from the southeastern part of Cross River State. The state is named after the Qua Iboe River, is Nigeria's 21st state, and has Uyo as its capital. It borders Cross River to the east, Abia State and Rivers State to the west and northwest, and the Atlantic Ocean to the south.

The first administrators were Tunde Ogbeha (1987–1988), Godwin Abbe (1988–1990) and Idongesit Nkanga (1990–1992). In January 1992, Akpan Isemin of the National Republican Convention became the first civilian governor. Following the November 1993 coup, the state was administered by Yakubu Bako (1993–1996), Joseph Adeusi (1996–1998) and John Ebiye (1998–1999). Since the advent of the Fourth Republic of Nigeria in 1999, the sequence of elected governors has been: Victor Attah (Peoples Democratic Party (PDP), 1999–2007), Godswill Akpabio (PDP, 2007–2015)—who later joined the All Progressives Congress in 2018 and was elected President of the Senate on 13 June 2023—followed by Udom Gabriel Emmanuel (PDP, 2015–2023) and Umo Bassey Eno (PDP, elected 2023).

Heads of the government of Akwa Ibom State
Governor		Term in office (Note: For elected governors, the month and year of their election into office/inauguration to the position is shown.)	Party	Election	D. Governor
—	Tunde Ogbeha (b. 1945)	28 September 1987 – 30 July 1988	Military administrator	—	Office did not exist
Godwin Abbe speaking on TV with microphone	Godwin Abbe (b. 1949)	31 July 1988 – 5 September 1990	Military administrator	—	Office did not exist
Idongesit Nkanga wearing a traditional cap	Idongesit Nkanga (b. 1952, d. 2020)	5 September 1990 – 2 January 1992	Military administrator	—	Office did not exist
—	Akpan Isemin (b. 1939, d. 2009)	2 January 1992 – 18 November 1993	NRC	1991	Etim Jack Okpoyo
—	Yakubu Bako (b. 1952)	15 December 1993 – 21 August 1996	Military administrator	—	Office abolished
Joseph Adeusi portrait wearing spectacles	Joseph Adeusi (b. 1940, d. 2016)	21 August 1996 – 9 August 1998	Military administrator	—	Office abolished
—	John Ebiye	9 August 1998 – 29 May 1999	Military administrator	—	Office abolished
—	Victor Attah (b. 1961)	29 May 1999 – 29 May 2007	PDP	1999; 2003	Chris Ekpenyong (May 1999–July 2005)
—	Victor Attah (b. 1961)	29 May 1999 – 29 May 2007	PDP	1999; 2003	Michael Udofia (July 2005–May 2007)
A portrait of Godswill Obot Akpabio on a black suit	Godswill Akpabio (b. 1962)	29 May 2007 – 29 May 2015	PDP	2007; 2011	Patrick Ekpotu (2007–2011)
A portrait of Godswill Obot Akpabio on a black suit	Godswill Akpabio (b. 1962)	29 May 2007 – 29 May 2015	PDP	2007; 2011	Nsima Ekere (2011–November 2012) (Note: Ekere retired as deputy governor.)
A portrait of Godswill Obot Akpabio on a black suit	Godswill Akpabio (b. 1962)	29 May 2007 – 29 May 2015	PDP	2007; 2011	Valerie Ebe (November 2012 – 29 May 2015)
—	Udom Emmanuel (b. 1966)	29 May 2015 – 29 May 2023	PDP	2015; 2019	Moses Ekpo
—	Umo Eno (b. 1964)	29 May 2023 – Incumbent	PDP	2023	Akon Eyakenyi

== See also ==
- States of Nigeria
- List of state governors of Nigeria
