= Nigerian National Assembly delegation from Akwa Ibom =

Akwa Ibom's delegation in Nigeria's National Assembly

The Nigerian National Assembly delegation from Akwa Ibom comprises two Senators representing Akwa Ibom North-East and Akwa Ibom North-West, and six Representatives representing Ikono/Ini, Eket/Onna/Esit Eket/Ibeno, Etinan/Nsit Ibom/Nsit Ubium, Mbo/Okobo/Oron/Udung Uko/Urue, Ukanafun/Orukanam, and Itu/Ibiono Ibom.

== Fourth Republic ==
=== The 4th Parliament (1999–2003) ===
OFFICE	NAME	PARTY	CONSTITUENCY	TERM
Senator	Akpanudo-Edehe John James	PDP	Akwa Ibom North-East	1999–2003
Senator	Emmanuel Ibok Essien	PDP	Akwa Ibom North-West	1999–2003
Senator	Udo Udoma	PDP	Akwa Ibom South	1999–2003
Representative	Akpan Eno Sampson	PDP	Ukanafun/Orukanam	1999–2003
Representative	Bassey AsuquoEmah	PDP	Etinan	1999–2003
Representative	Enang Ita Solomon	PDP	Itu/Ibiono Ibom	1999–2003
Representative	Nduese Essien	PDP	Eket	1999–2003
Representative	Esu Tony Ibana	ANPP	Ikot Ekpene/ Essien Udim/ Ubot Akara	1999–2003
Representative	Eyo Akaninyene Eno	ANPP	Abak	1999–2003
Representative	Minimah Iquo-Inyang	PDP	Ikono/ Ini	1999–2003
Representative	Udoh Esio Oquong	PDP	Oron, Mbo, Okobo, UrueOffong/Oruko, Udung-Uko.	1999–2003
Representative	Udoh Bernard Ambrose	PDP	Ikot Abasi	1999–2003
Representative	Ukpong Emaeyak Nkana	PDP	Uyo/Uruan/Nsit Ata/Ibeskip Asutan	1999–2003

=== 6th Parliament (2007–2011) ===
OFFICE	NAME	PARTY	CONSTITUENCY	TERM
Senate	Aloysius Akpan Etok	PDP	Akwa Ibom North West	2007–2011
Senate	Effiong Bob	PDP	Akwa Ibom North East	2007–2011
Senate	Eme Ufot Ekaette	PDP	Akwa Ibom South	2007–2011
House of Representatives	Aniedi Ikpong King	PDP	Etinan/Nsit ibom/Nsit Ubim	2007–2011
House of Representatives	Bassey Effiong Etim	PDP	Uyo/Uruan/Nsit Atai
House of Representatives	Bernard Udoh	PDP	Ikot Abasi/Mkpat Enin/Eastern Obolo	2007–2011
House of Representatives	Ekperikpe Ekpo	PDP	Abak/Etim ekpo/Ika	2007–2011
House of Representatives	Enang Ita Solomon	PDP	Itu/Ibiono Ibom	2007–2011
House of Representatives	Eseme Sunday Eyiboh	PDP	Eket	2007–2011
House of Representatives	Ini Akpan Udoka	PDP	Ikono/Ini
House of Representatives	Patty Etete Ineme	PDP	Ikot Ekpene/Essien Udim/Obot Akara	2007–2011
House of Representatives	Peter Linus Umoh	PDP	Oron, Mbo, Okobo, Urue Offong/Oruko, Udung Uko	2007–2011
House of Representatives	Sabbath Sandy Obot	PDP	Ukanafun/Orukaanam	2007–2011

=== 7th Parliament (2011–2015) ===
OFFICE	NAME	PARTY	CONSTITUENCY	TERM
Senate	Aloysius Akpan Etok	PDP	Akwa Ibom North West	2011–2015
Senate	Ita Enang	PDP	Akwa Ibom North East	2011–2015
Senate	Helen Esuene	PDP	Akwa Ibom South	2011–2015
House of Representatives	Effiong Akpan	PDP	Etinan/Nsit ibom/Nsit Ubim	2011–2015
House of Representatives	Ekpenyong Etim	PDP	Uyo/Uruan/Nsit Ata/Ibesip Asutan	2011–2015
House of Representatives	Udoh Micah	PDP	Ikot Abasi/Mkpat Enin/Eastern Obolo	2011–2015
House of Representatives	Ekon Bartholomew	PDP	Abak/Etim Ekpo/Ika	2011–2015
House of Representatives	Archibong Edet	PDP	Itu/Ibiono Ibom	2011–2015
House of Representatives	Dan-Abia Bassey	PDP	Eket/Onna/Esit Eket/Ibeno	2011–2015
House of Representatives	Ini Akpan Udoka	PDP	Ikono/Ini	2011–2015
House of Representatives	Francis Udoh	PDP	Ikot Ekpene/Essien Udim/Obot Akara	2011–2015
House of Representatives	Uwak Edet	PDP	Oron, Mbo, Okobo, Urue Offong/Oruko, Udung Uko	2011–2015
House of Representatives	Ukoette Isaac	PDP	Ukanafun/Orukanam	2011–2015

=== 8th Parliament (2015–2019) ===
OFFICE	NAME	PARTY	CONSTITUENCY	TERM
Senate	Godswill Akpabio	APC	Akwa Ibom North West	2015–2019
Senate	Bassey Albert	PDP	Akwa Ibom North East	2015–2019
Senate	Nelson Asuquo Effiong	APC	Akwa Ibom South	2015–2019
House of Representatives	Samuel Okon	PDP	Etinan/Nsit ibom/Nsit Ubim	2015–2019
House of Representatives	Dr. Michael Okon Enyong	PDP	Uyo/Uruan/Nsit Ata/Ibesikpo Asutan	2015–2019
House of Representatives	Francis Charles Udoyuk	PDP	Ikot Abasi/Mkpat Enin/Eastern Obolo	2015–2019
House of Representatives	Emmanuel Ikon	PDP	Abak/Etim Ekpo/Ika	2015–2019
House of Representatives	Henry Okon Archibong	PDP	Itu/Ibiono Ibom	2015–2019
House of Representatives	Owoidighe Ekpoatai	PDP	Eket/Onna/Esit Eket/Ibeno	2015–2019
House of Representatives	Iboro Asuquo Ekanem	PDP	Ikono/Ini	2015–2019
House of Representatives	Emmanuel S. Asian,	PDP	Ikot Ekpene/Essien Udim/Obot Akara	2015–2019
House of Representatives	Nse Bassey Ekpenyong	PDP	Oron, Mbo, Okobo, Urue Offong/Oruko, Udung Uko	2015–2019
House of Representatives	Emmanuel Ukoette Isaac	PDP	Ukanafun/Orukanam	2015–2019

=== 9th Parliament (2019–2023) ===
OFFICE	NAME	PARTY	CONSTITUENCY	TERM
Senate	Christopher Stephen Ekpenyong	PDP	Akwa Ibom North West	2019–2023
Senate	Bassey Albert	PDP	Akwa Ibom North East	2019–2023
Senate	Akon Etim Eyakenyi	PDP	Akwa Ibom South	2019–2023
House of Representatives	Onofiok Akpan Luke	PDP	Etinan/Nsit ibom/Nsit Ubim	2019–2023
House of Representatives	Dr. Michael Okon Enyong	PDP	Uyo/Uruan/Nsit Ata/Ibesikpo Asutan	2019–2023
House of Representatives	Francis Charles Udoyuk	PDP	Ikot Abasi/Mkpat Enin/Eastern Obolo	2019–2023
House of Representatives	Aniekan John Umanah	PDP	Abak/Etim Ekpo/Ika	2019–2023
House of Representatives	Henry Okon Archibong	PDP	Itu/Ibiono Ibom	2019–2023
House of Representatives	Patrick Nathan Ifon	PDP	Eket/Onna/Esit Eket/Ibeno	2019–2023
House of Representatives	Emmanuel Effiong Ukpong-udo	PDP	Ikono/Ini	2019–2023
House of Representatives	Francis Charles Uduyok	PDP	Ikot Ekpene/Essien Udim/Obot Akara	2019–2023
House of Representatives	Nse Bassey Ekpenyong	PDP	Oron, Mbo, Okobo, Urue Offong/Oruko, Udung Uko	2019–2023
House of Representatives	Unyime Josiah Idem	PDP	Ukanafun/Orukanam	2019–2023

=== 10th Parliament (2023–2027) ===
OFFICE	NAME	PARTY	CONSTITUENCY	TERM
Senate	Godswill Obot Akpabio	APC	Akwa Ibom North-West	2023–2027
Senate	Bassey Aniekan Etim	PDP	Akwa Ibom North-East	2023–2027
House of Representatives	Emmanuel Effiong Ukpong-udo	PDP	Ikono/Ini	2023–2027
House of Representatives	Okpulupm Etteh	PDP	Eket/Onna/Esit Eket/Ibeno	2023–2027
House of Representatives	Paul Asuquo Ekpo	PDP	Etinan/Nsit Ibom/Nsit Ubium	2023–2027
House of Representatives	Martins Etim Esin	PDP	Mbo/Okobo/Oron/Udung Uko/Urue	2023–2027
House of Representatives	Unyime Josiah Idem	PDP	Ukanafun/Orukanam	2023–2027
House of Representatives	Ime Bassey Okon	PDP	Itu/Ibiono Ibom	2023–2027
