= 1999 Cross River State gubernatorial election =

1999 gubernatorial election in Cross River State, Nigeria

- January 9, 1999
Nominee	Donald Duke
Party	PDP	All People's Party (Nigeria)
Popular vote	529,335	457,660
Governor before election
Clement Ebri
NRC
Elected Governor
Donald Duke
PDP

The 1999 Cross River State gubernatorial election occurred in Nigeria on January 9, 1999. The PDP nominee Donald Duke won the election, defeating the APP candidate.

Donald Duke emerged as the PDP candidate.

== Electoral system ==
The Governor of Cross River State is elected using the plurality voting system.

== Primary election ==
=== PDP primary ===
The PDP primary election was won by Donald Duke.

== Results ==
The total number of registered voters in the state was 1,091,930. Total number of votes cast was 1,006,387 while number of valid votes was 998,607. Rejected votes were 7,780.

Candidate	Party	Votes	%
Donald Duke	People's Democratic Party	529,335	53.63
All People's Party	457,660	46.37	
Total		986,995	100.00
Valid votes		986,995	99.22
Invalid/blank votes		7,780	0.78
Total votes		994,775	100.00
Registered voters/turnout		1,091,930	91.10
Source: Nigeria World, IFES, Semantics Scholar
