= Akwa Ibom State Peoples Democratic Party =

- Chairman: Rt. Hon. Elder Aniekan Akpan
- Headquarters: Uyo, Akwa Ibom State, Nigeria
- National affiliation: Peoples Democratic Party
- Senate (Akwa Ibomite seats): 3 / 3
- House of Representatives (Akwa Ibomite seats): 8 / 8

The Akwa Ibom State Peoples Democratic Party, based in Uyo is the official state level chapter of the Peoples Democratic Party (PDP) in Akwa Ibom State. It is headed by chairman Rt. Hon Elder Aniekan Akpan, who was elected to lead the state party.

== Current elected officials ==
=== Members of the Senate (2015 - 2019) ===
Senator	District
Nelson Asuquo	Akwa Ibom South
Godswill Akpabio	Akwa Ibom North West
Bassey Albert	Akwa Ibom North East

=== Members of the Senate (2019 - 2023) ===
Senator	District
Akon Eyakenyi	Akwa Ibom South
Chris Ekpenyong	Akwa Ibom North West
Bassey Albert	Akwa Ibom North East

=== Members of the Senate (2024 - 2027) ===
Senator	District
Ekong Sampson	Akwa Ibom South
Godswill Akpabio	Akwa Ibom North West
Aniekan Bassey	Akwa Ibom North East

=== Members of the House of Representatives 2015-2019 ===
Representative	Constituency
Aniekan Umanah	Abak/Etim Ekpo/Ika
Francis Charles Uduyork	Ikot Abasi/Mkpat Enin Eastern Obolo
Emmanuel S. Akpan	Ikot Ekpene/Essien Udim/Obot Akara
Emmanuel Isaac Ukoete	Ukanafun/Oruk Anam
Iboro Asuquo Ekanem	Ikono/Ini
Henry Okon Archibong	Itu/ibiono Ibom
Onofiok Akpan Luke	Etinan/Nsit Ibom/Nsit Ubium
Michael Enyong	Uyo/Nsit Atai/Uruan/Ibesikpo

=== Members of the House of Representatives 2019-2023 ===
Representative	Constituency
Aniekan Umanah	Abak/Etim Ekpo/Ika
Francis Charles Uduyork	Ikot Abasi/Mkpat Enin/ Eastern Obolo
Ekong Nsikak O.	Ikot Ekpene/Essien Udim/Obot Akara
Unyime Josiah Idem	Ukanafun/Oruk Anam
Emmanuel E. Ukpongudo	Ikono/Ini
Henry Okon Archibong	Itu/ibiono Ibom
Onofiok Akpan Luke	Etinan/Nsit Ibom/Nsit Ubium
Mark Udo Esset	Uyo/Nsit Atai/Uruan/Ibesikpo

=== Executive Board ===
- Chairman: Rt. Hon (Elder) Aniekan Akpan
- Deputy Chairman: Harrison Ekpo
- 1st Vice-Chair: Augugstine Esau Akpan
- 2nd Vice-Chair: Inemesit Itina
- 3rd Vice-Chair: Barr. Ekpong Edemumoh
- Secretary: Ibanga Akpan Brownson
- 1st Assistant Secretary: David Umanah
- 2nd Assistant Secretary: Anietie Sunday Akpan
- 3rd Assistant Secretary: Umana Benjamin Umana
- Treasurer: Mmeme Akpabio
- 1st Assistant Treasurer: Mabel Udom
- 2nd Assistant Treasurer: Johnson Jumbo
- 3rd Assistant Treasurer: Samuel Alfred Awakessien
- Financial Secretary: Effiong Ita Emah
- Assistant Financial Secretary: Chief Friday Ebong
- Organizing Secretary: Emmanuel Mbong
- 1st Assistant Organizing Secretary: Febian Emmanuel
- 2nd Assistant Organizing Secretary: Friday Uko Archibong
- 3rd Assistant Organizing Secretary: Lawson Bassey Ukim
- Publicity Secretary: Edwin Ebiese
- Assistant Publicity Secretary: Regina Udonsek
- Auditor: Andy Halifax Ekitok
- Assistant Auditor: Usenmfon Ibanga
- Legal Adviser: Ekemeni Uba
- Assistant Legal Adviser: Michael Eyo
- Woman Leader: Inibehe Silas
- 1st Assistant Woman Leader: Udeme Friday Johnny
- 2nd Assistant Woman Leader: Agnes Okon Joe
- 3rd Assistant Woman Leader: Alice Udoete Oyuho
- Youth Leader: Ubong Effiong
- 1st Assistant Youth Leader: Ben Edensenting
- 2nd Assistant Youth Leader: Uchang Etim Akaka
- 3rd Assistant Youth Leader: Itohowo Ibe Bassey
- Ex-Officio: Sarah Ekwo
- Ex-Officio: Hannah Sunday
- Ex-Officio: Iniobong Ukwa
- Ex-Officio: Imaobong Augusta Archibong
- Ex-Officio: Esther Robson Umoh
- Ex-Officio: Ofonime Michael Akpan

== List of chairpersons ==
Chairpersons
Chair	Tenure	LGA
Joseph Edet Ating	1999–2001	Mbo
Tony Ememyi	2001–2006	Urue-Offong/Oruko
Otu Ita Toyo	2006–2008	Udung-Uko
Uwem Ita Etuk	2008–2012	Ibesikpo
Obong Paul Ekpo	2012–2020	Etinan
Udo Ekpenyong	2020-2021	Ukanafun
Aniekan Akpan	2021-2023	Ukanafun
