= 2003 Cross River State gubernatorial election =

2003 gubernatorial election in Cross River State, Nigeria

- (Nigeria)
- April 19, 2003
Nominee	Donald Duke	John Okpa
Party	PDP	ANPP
Running mate	Walter Eneji
Popular vote	1,193,290
Governor before election
Donald Duke
PDP
Elected Governor
Donald Duke
PDP

The 2003 Cross River State gubernatorial election occurred on April 19, 2003, in Nigeria. Incumbent Governor, PDP's Donald Duke won election for a second term, defeating his immediate past deputy John Oyom Okpa of the ANPP and three other candidates.

Donald Duke emerged winner in the PDP gubernatorial primary election. His running mate was Walter Eneji.

== Electoral system ==
The Governor of Cross River State is elected using the plurality voting system.

== Results ==
A total of five candidates registered with the Independent National Electoral Commission to contest in the election. Incumbent Governor, PDP's Donald Duke won election for a second term, defeating four other candidates.

The total number of registered voters in the state was 1,289,192, and 83.32% (i.e. 1,074,132) of registered voters participated in the exercise.

Candidate	Party	Votes	%
Donald Duke	People's Democratic Party (PDP)	1,193,290	100.00
John Okpa	All Nigeria Peoples Party (ANPP)		
Peter Ogbang	Alliance for Democracy (AD)		
Ntufam Matthew Ojong	United Nigeria People's Party (UNPP)		
Maj. Obi-Odu	National Democratic Party (NDP)		
Total		1,193,290	100.00
Registered voters/turnout		1,289,192	–
Source: Gamji, Africa Update, Dawodu
