= 1999 Akwa Ibom State gubernatorial election =

1999 gubernatorial election in Akwa Ibom State, Nigeria

- January 9, 1999
Nominee	Obong Victor Attah
Party	PDP	All People's Party (Nigeria)
Running mate	Chris Ekpenyong
Popular vote	843,360	317,373
Governor before election
John Ebiye
Nigerian military junta
Elected Governor
Obong Victor Attah
PDP

The 1999 Akwa Ibom State gubernatorial election occurred in Nigeria on January 9, 1999. The PDP nominee Obong Victor Attah won the election, defeating the APP candidate.

Obong Victor Attah won the PDP nomination in the primary election. His running mate was Chris Ekpenyong.

== Electoral system ==
The Governor of Akwa Ibom State is elected using the plurality voting system.

== Results ==
PDP's Obong Victor Attah emerged winner in the contest.

The total number of registered voters in the state for the election was 1,450,367. However, 1,476,500 were previously issued voting cards in the state.

Candidate	Party	Votes	%
Obong Victor Attah	People's Democratic Party (PDP)	843,360	72.21
All People's Party (APP)	317,373	27.17	
Alliance for Democracy (AD)	7,254	0.62	
Total		1,167,987	100.00
Registered voters/turnout		1,450,367	–
Source: Nigeria World, IFES
