= 2003 Akwa Ibom State gubernatorial election =

2003 gubernatorial election in Akwa Ibom State, Nigeria

- (Nigeria)
- April 19, 2003
Nominee	Obong Victor Attah	Samson Ime Umanna
Party	PDP	ANPP
Running mate	Chris Ekpenyong
Popular vote	1,028,722
Governor before election
Obong Victor Attah
PDP
Elected Governor
Obong Victor Attah
PDP

The 2003 Akwa Ibom State gubernatorial election occurred on April 19, 2003. Incumbent Governor, PDP's Obong Victor Attah won election for a second term, defeating ANPP's Samson Ime Umanna and about three other candidates.

Obong Victor Attah won the PDP nomination in the primary election. He retained Chris Ekpenyong as his running mate.

== Electoral system ==
The Governor of Akwa Ibom State is elected using the plurality voting system.

== Results ==
A total of about five candidates registered with the Independent National Electoral Commission to contest in the election. Incumbent Governor, Obong Victor Attah won election for a second term, defeating about four other candidates.

The total number of registered voters in the state was 1,624,495. However, only 82.42% (i.e. 1,338,970) of registered voters participated in the exercise.

Candidate	Party	Votes	%
Obong Victor Attah	People's Democratic Party (PDP)	1,028,722	100.00
Samson Ime Umanna	All Nigeria Peoples Party (ANPP)		
Maria Ikpe	Alliance for Democracy (AD)		
Samuel Udonsak	United Nigeria People's Party (UNPP)		
Ben Okoko	National Conscience Party (NCP)		
Total		1,028,722	100.00
Registered voters/turnout		1,624,495	–
Source: Gamji, Africa Update, Dawodu
