= Akpabio =

- Gender: Male

Origin
- Word/name: Nigeria
- Meaning: the first community.

Akpabio is a surname.

== Notable people with the surname: ==
- George Akpabio (born 1992), Nigerian footballer
- Godswill Akpabio (born 1962), Nigerian lawyer and politician
- Ibanga Akpabio, Nigerian politician
- Prince Ukpong Akpabio (born 1976), Nigerian politician
