= 2015 Nigerian Senate elections in Akwa Ibom State =

2015 Nigerian Senate election in Akwa Ibom State

The 2015 Nigerian Senate election in Akwa Ibom State was held on March 28, 2015, to elect members of the Nigerian Senate to represent Akwa Ibom State. Bassey Albert representing Akwa Ibom North East, Godswill Akpabio representing Akwa Ibom North West and Nelson Effiong representing Akwa Ibom South all won on the platform of Peoples Democratic Party.

== Overview ==
Affiliation	Party		Total
Affiliation	PDP	APC	Total
Before Election			3
After Election	3	–	3

== Summary ==
District	Incumbent	Party	Elected Senator	Party
Akwa Ibom North East			Bassey Albert	PDP
Akwa Ibom North West			Godswill Akpabio	PDP
Akwa Ibom South			Nelson Effiong	PDP

== Results ==
=== Akwa Ibom North East ===
Peoples Democratic Party candidate Bassey Albert won the election, defeating All Progressives Congress candidate Emmanuel Obot and other party candidates.

2015 Nigerian Senate election in Akwa Ibom State
Party	Candidate	Votes	%
PDP	Bassey Albert		
APC	Emmanuel Obot		
Total votes			
PDP hold			

=== Akwa Ibom North West ===
Peoples Democratic Party candidate Godswill Akpabio won the election, defeating All Progressives Congress candidate Inibehe Okori and other party candidates.

2015 Nigerian Senate election in Akwa Ibom State
Party	Candidate	Votes	%
PDP	Godswill Akpabio		
APC	Inibehe Okori		
Total votes			
PDP hold			

=== Akwa Ibom South ===
Peoples Democratic Party candidate Nelson Effiong won the election, defeating All Progressives Congress candidate Bassey Etienam and other party candidates.

2015 Nigerian Senate election in Akwa Ibom State
Party	Candidate	Votes	%
PDP	Nelson Effiong		
APC	Bassey Etienam		
Total votes			
PDP hold			
