= 1991 Cross River State gubernatorial election =

1991 gubernatorial election in Cross River State, Nigeria

Cross River gubernatorial election
- December 14, 1991
Nominee	Clement Ebri
Party	NRC
Elected Governor
Clement Ebri
NRC

The 1991 Cross River State gubernatorial election occurred on December 14, 1991. NRC candidate Clement Ebri won the election.

== Conduct ==
The gubernatorial election was conducted using an open ballot system. Primaries for the two parties to select their flag bearers were conducted on October 19, 1991.

The election occurred on December 14, 1991. NRC candidate Clement Ebri won the election.
