= Etido Ibekwe =

Nigerian politician

Majority Leader of the Akwa Ibom State House of Assembly
- Constituency: Essien Udim State Constituency

Personal details
- Born: Akwa Ibom State, Nigeria
- Occupation: Politician

Etido Ibekwe is a Nigerian politician and former Majority Leader of the Akwa Ibom State House of Assembly. He represented the Essien Udim State Constituency in the Assembly.
