= Patrick Ekpotu =

Nigerian politician

Patrick Akpan Ekpotu (born 26 June 1960) is a Nigerian politician and chemical engineer. He is the former Deputy Governor of Akwa Ibom State.

== Life ==
Ekpotu was born in Akwa Ibom State to a renowned teacher Gaul and his wife Cornelia in 1960. He is married to Mbosowo and they have three children. A member of the People's Democratic Party, he served as Deputy Governor to Godswill Akpabio in Akwa Ibom state from 2007 to 2011, having previously served as the state's Commissioner for Information, Culture and Ethical Re-Orientation during Governor Victor Attah's administration. He was also Federal Commissioner (South South) in the National Assembly Service Commission from 2003 to 2005. He is the author of several books, including Lifting the Peril, which was published in 2011.

== Education ==
He received his secondary education Regina Coeli College, Essene and Nsit People's Grammar School in Afaha Offiong. In 1986, he graduated from Rivers State University of Science and Technology with a Bachelor's degree in Chemical/Petroleum Engineering.

== Fellowship and awards ==
He is a Fellow of the Nigerian Society of Engineers, the Institute of Certified Economists of Nigeria and a Paul Harris Fellow, Rotary International. He has been awarded Ebong Ifiok of Ibibio land, Ibatai Ikpa Nnung Assang, Edet Nsit Ibom and others.
