= Akon Eyakenyi =

Nigerian politician (born 1960)

Her Excellency Akon Eyakenyi
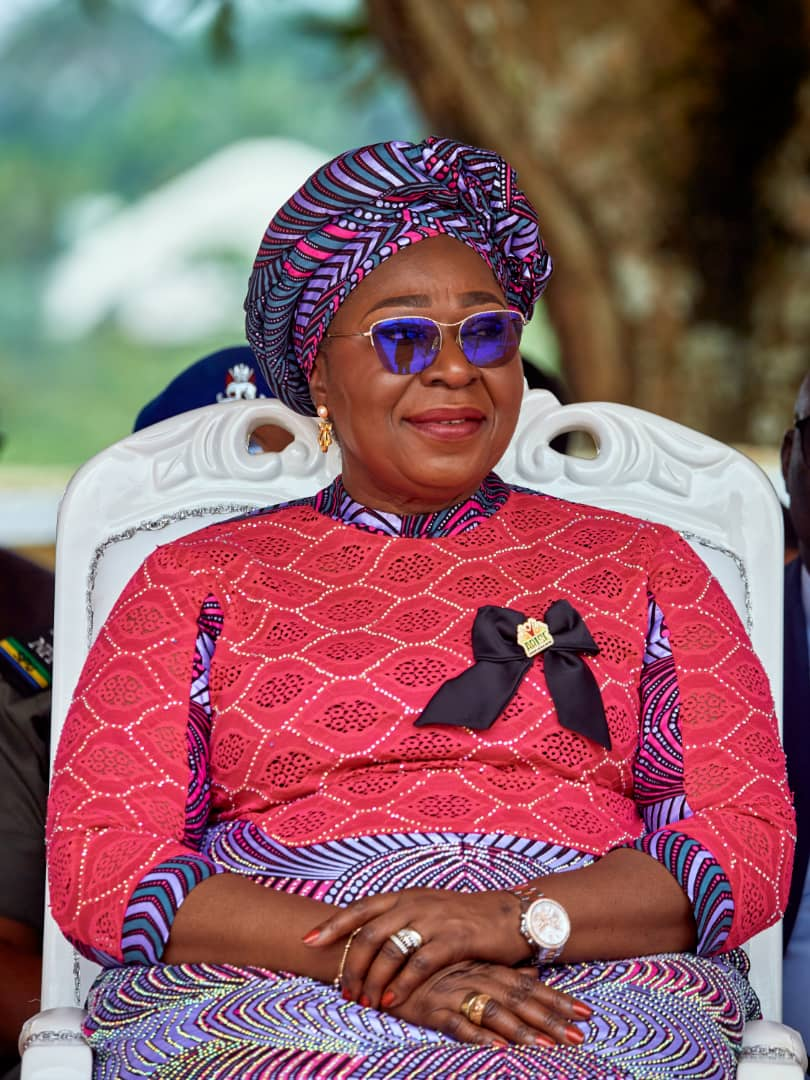

Deputy Governor of Akwa Ibom
- Incumbent
- Assumed office 29 May 2023
- Governor: Umo Eno
- Preceded by: Moses Ekpo

Senator for Akwa Ibom South
- In office 11 June 2019 – 29 May 2023
- Preceded by: Nelson Effiong
- Succeeded by: Ekong Sampson

Minister of Lands, Housing and Urban Development
- In office 5 March 2014 – 28 May 2015
- President: Goodluck Jonathan
- Preceded by: Nduese Essien
- Succeeded by: Babatunde Fashola

Personal details
- Born: 24 February 1960 (age 66) Urue-Offong, Eastern Region, British Nigeria (now in Akwa Ibom State, Nigeria)
- Party: All Progressives Congress
- Education: University of Calabar
- Occupation: Politician; teacher

Akon Etim Eyakenyi (born 24 February 1960) is a Nigerian politician, serving as the current Deputy Governor of Akwa Ibom State. She served as the senator for Akwa Ibom South from 2019 to 2023. Before being elected to the senate, she was the Minister of Lands, Housing and Urban Development from 2014 to 2015 under President Goodluck Jonathan.

== Early life and education ==
Eyakenyi was born in 1960 into the family of Chief Uweh Isangedihi in Urue-Offong/Oruko local government area in Akwa Ibom State. In 1968 she attended Government Primary School, Uko Uyokim where she finished with her First School Leaving Certificate in 1974. In 1974 she enrolled into the Methodist Teacher's Training College in Oron and graduated with Teachers Grade II Certificate in 1979.

In 1983, Eyakenyi enrolled at the University of Calabar and earned a Nigerian Certificate in Education (NCE) in 1986. In 1990, she obtained a Bachelor of Education (B.Ed) degree from the University of Calabar. She later earned a Master of Education (M.Ed) in 2010 and a Doctor of Philosophy (Ph.D) in Curriculum Education in 2014.

== Career ==
Eyakenyi began her career as a teacher when she was appointed Mistress I & II by the Cross River State Education Board, where she served from 1986 to 1993. In 1991, while serving as a teacher, she was appointed Supervisor for Education, Youths, Sports and Culture in Oron. Subsequently, she served in the Akwa Ibom State Ministry of Education from 1993 to 1999 as an education officer. In 1999, she was appointed to serve on the Akwa Ibom State Education Board.

In 2000, she was appointed Commissioner for Industry, Commerce and Tourism in Akwa Ibom State during the regime of Victor Attah. In 2013, she was appointed by Godswill Akpabio as chairman of Akwa Ibom State Technical Schools Board. She served as chairman of the board until her appointment by President Goodluck Jonathan as Minister of Lands, Housing and Urban Development in 2014.

=== Senate ===
In 2018, Eyakenyi declared her intentions to run for the senate to represent Akwa Ibom South senatorial district. In October 2018, she participated in the Peoples Democratic Party (PDP) primaries and emerged as the winner. On 25 February 2019 she was declared winner of the 2019 general elections to represent Akwa Ibom South senatorial district. In 2021, she introduced a bill for the establishment of the Nigerian Coast Guard in the senate.

== Personal life ==
She is married with children and grand children.

== Awards and recognition ==
- Paul Harris Fellow (Major Donor) - Rotary Foundation of Rotary International
- Fellowship Award for Selfless Service - Akwa Ibom State Polytechnic, Ikot Osura.
- Advocacy of Peace Award - Nigeria Peace Corps
- Ibom Pride Award of Excellence – Akwa Ibom State Association of Nigeria (AKISAN), USA (2016)
- Ibom Pride Award of Excellence Akwa Ibom State Association of Nigeria (AKISAN), USA (2019)
- Fellow Certified Facilities Manager (FCFM) - Institute of Global Facilities Management, Nigeria
- Role Model to the Female Child Award - 6th Niger Delta Achievers Merit Award (NDAMA)
