= 1991 Akwa Ibom State gubernatorial election =

1991 gubernatorial election in Akwa Ibom State, Nigeria

Akwa Ibom gubernatorial election
- December 14, 1991
Nominee	Akpan Isemin
Party	NRC
Elected Governor
Akpan Isemin
NRC

The 1991 Akwa Ibom State gubernatorial election occurred on December 14, 1991. NRC candidate Akpan Isemin won the election.

== Conduct ==
The gubernatorial election was conducted using an open ballot system. Primaries for the two parties to select their flag bearers were conducted on October 19, 1991.

The election occurred on December 14, 1991. NRC candidate Akpan Isemin won the election.
