= Etok =

Etok is a surname. Notable people with the surname include:

- Tivi Etok (born 1929), Canadian Inuk artist
- Aloysius Akpan Etok (born 1958), Nigerian politician
