= 1983 Cross River State gubernatorial election =

1983 gubernatorial election in Cross River State, Nigeria

- August 13, 1983
Nominee	Donald Etiebet
Party	NPN
Elected Governor
Donald Etiebet
NPN

The 1983 Cross River State gubernatorial election occurred on August 13, 1983. NPN candidate Donald Etiebet won the election.

== Results ==
Donald Etiebet representing NPN won the election. The election held on August 13, 1983.
