= Etim Jack Okpoyo =

Nigerian politician

1st Deputy Governor of Akwa Ibom State
- In office 2 January 1992 – 18 November 1993

Personal details
- Born: 23 September 1943 (age 82) Urue-Offong/Oruko LGA, Akwa Ibom State, Nigeria
- Party: National Republican Convention
- Other political affiliations: All Nigeria People's Party (1999-2004) People's Democratic Party 2005 till date

Etim Jack Okpoyo (born 23 September 1943), was a Nigerian politician. He is of Oron origin. He is the former and the first deputy Governor of Akwa Ibom State from 1992–1993. He was a businessman, a one-time Ambassador of Nigeria to Italy and Albania, and a civil engineer.

== Early life ==
Okpoyo was born on September 23, 1943, the seventh child of Chief Jack and Akon Okpoyo.

He began his education at Eyubia Central School. In 1950 he was transferred to the District Council School Oruko, where he obtained his First School Leaving Certificate (FSLC). In 1959 he proceeded to Lutheran High School, Obot Idim, now in the Ibesikpo Asutan Local Government Area. There, he obtained his West African School Certificate (WASC) in Division Two in 1963.

In 1964 he received a diploma in Civil Engineering from the Yaba College of Technology, and in 1973 he obtained a degree in Civil Engineering from Fourah Bay College, University of Sierra Leone. For two years, he served as a president of the Oron Development Union Port Harcourt branch. For five consecutive years, he served as the President General of the Oruko Development Association and as a board of trustees member of the Oron Local Government Industrial and Development Fund.

Okpoyo worked as a survey party chief with the Louis Berger Engineering Company. Between 1974 and 1991 he also worked with the Nigerian Agip Oil Company Limited, Port Harcourt, before resigning to go into private business.

== Politics and public service ==
He was elected as the first civilian deputy governor in 1992, alongside Obong Akpan Isemin, on the platform of the National Republican Convention, NRC. From 1992 to 1993, he served as Deputy Governor. He was the Nigerian Ambassador to Italy and Albania from 2000 to 2003.

Okpoyo was honored by the church as a Knight of John Wesley (KJW) under the, then, Archdiocese of Calabar.
