= Nigerian Coast Guard =

Government agency of Nigeria

Nigeria Coast Guard Corps
Coast Guard overview
- Formed: 2021
- Headquarters: Lagos
- Minister responsible: Adegboyega Oyetola, Minister for Marine and Blue Economy
- Coast Guard executive: Abel Idaminabo, Commandant General
- Website: coastguard.ng

The Nigeria Coast Guard Corps (NCGC) is a government agency in the Federal Republic of Nigeria, responsible for maritime security and law enforcement along Nigeria's coastline.

== History ==
The Nigerian Coast Guard was officially established by Senator Akon Eyakenyi from Akwa Ibom South in 2021, in order to transition from the Nigerian Navy to dedicate a focus on safeguarding Nigeria's maritime interests and combating piracy, illegal fishing, and smuggling. The NCGC utilizes rank similar to the Nigerian Navy.
