= 1979 Cross River State gubernatorial election =

1979 gubernatorial election in Cross River State, Nigeria

- July 28, 1979
Nominee	Clement Nyong Isong
Party	NPN
Running mate	Mathias Ofoboche
Governor before election
Babatunde Elegbede
Nigerian military junta
Elected Governor
Clement Isong
NPN

The 1979 Cross River State gubernatorial election occurred on July 28, 1979. NPN's Clement Isong won election for a first term to become Cross River State's first executive governor leading and, defeating main opposition in the contest.

Clement Isong emerged winner in the NPN gubernatorial primary election. His running mate was Mathias Ofoboche.

== Electoral system ==
The Governor of Cross River State is elected using the plurality voting system.

== Results ==
There were five political parties registered by the Federal Electoral Commission (FEDECO) to participate in the election. Clement Nyong Isong of the NPN won the contest by polling the highest votes.

Candidate	Party
Clement Isong	National Party of Nigeria (NPN)
Nigerian People's Party (NPP)	
Great Nigeria People's Party (GNPP)	
Total
Source: Africa Spectrum
