= Lutheran High School, Obot Idim =

Secondary School in Akwa Ibom, Nigeria

Lutheran High School
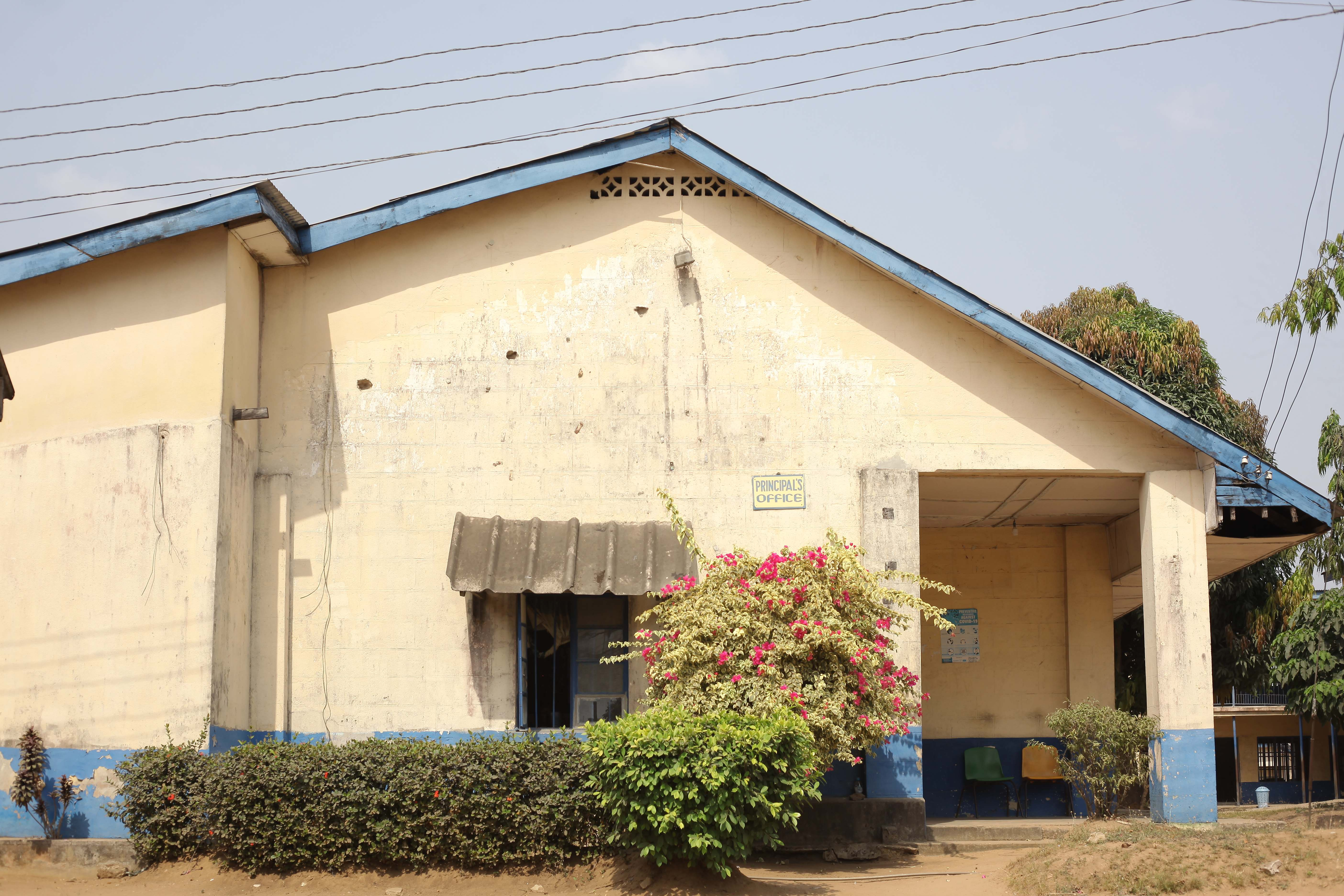
- Office building of the Principal, Lutheran High School, Obot Idim

Location
- Obot Idim, Ibesikpo Asutan L.G.A; Akwa Ibom; Nigeria
- Coordinates: 4.584356°N 7.553148°E

Information
- Motto: In Deo Stamus
- Opened: 1950
- Principal: Ifiok Umanah
- Grades: JS1-SS3
- Gender: Boys and Girls
- Houses: 4 (Ekong, Konz, Luther, Nau)
- Color: White Navy Blue Light Blue

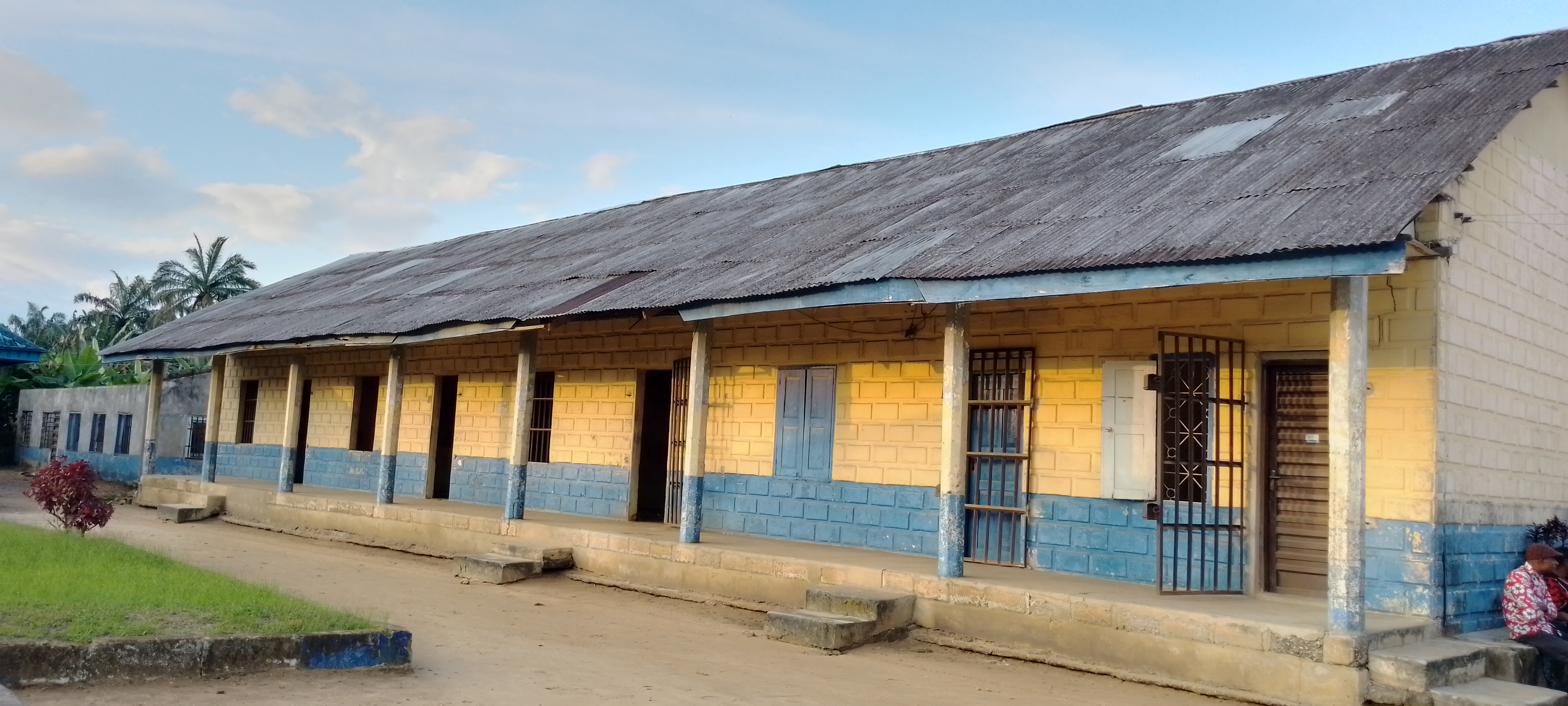
Staff Office at Lutheran High School, Obot Idim

Lutheran High School, Obot Idim is a Christian high school in Ibesikpo Asutan local government, Akwa Ibom. The school has an average class size of 20 students.

== History ==
Lutheran High School, Obot Idim was established in 1950. Rev. John Louis Konz was the first principal of the school. About 500 candidates took the first-ever entrance examination of the school, and only 28 were successful.

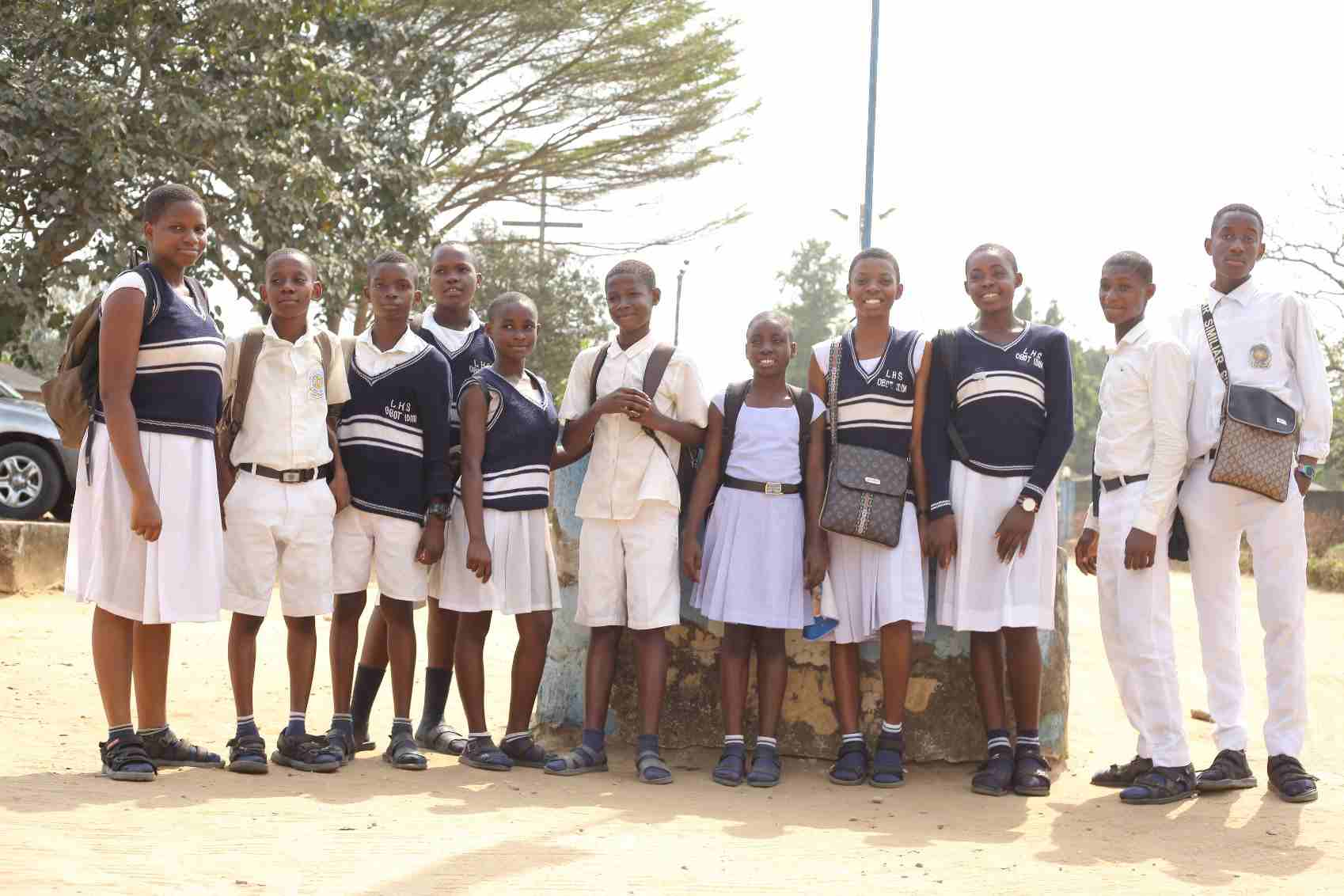
Some Lutheran High School, Obot Idim, students gather near their school's entrance to welcome guests, 25 February 2022

The school kicked off with the 28 successful candidates on the premises of Boechler Memorial Primary School.

Few years after its establishment, the school started seeing an increase in the number of applications. And by 1961, the student population had risen to 348. The number of teachers had also increased. That prompted the Lutheran Church of Nigeria to move the school from the Boechler Memorial Primary School to its present location.

== Notable alumni ==
=== Politics ===
- Etim Okpoyo - Former Deputy Governor of Akwa Ibom State
- Onofiok Luke - Member, representing Etinan/Nsit Ibom/Nsit Ubium in the House of Representatives

=== Academia ===
- Prof. Akan Williams - former Acting Vice Chancellor, Covenant University

=== Military ===
- Air Marshal Nsikak Eduok - Former Chief of Air Staff
- Air Commodore Ita Udoh Ime - Former Minister of Aviation
- E.Nkanga - Deputy Inspector General of police
