= 2011 Akwa Ibom State gubernatorial election =

Gubernatorial election in Nigeria

- April 26, 2011
Nominee	Godswill Akpabio	John James Akpan Udo-Edehe
Party	PDP	ACN
Popular vote	957,585	163,449
Governor before election
Godswill Akpabio
PDP
Elected Governor
Godswill Akpabio
PDP

The 2011 Akwa Ibom State gubernatorial election was the 5th gubernatorial election of Akwa Ibom State. Held on April 26, 2011, the People's Democratic Party nominee Godswill Akpabio won the election, defeating John James Akpan Udo-Edehe of the Action Congress of Nigeria.

== Results ==
A total of 14 candidates contested in the election. Godswill Akpabio from the People's Democratic Party won the election, defeating John James Akpan Udo-Edehe from the Action Congress of Nigeria. Valid votes was 1,148,433.

2011 Akwa Ibom State gubernatorial election
Party	Candidate	Votes	%	±%
PDP	Godswill Akpabio	957,585	83.38	
ACN	John James Akpan Udo-Edehe	163,449	14.23	
PDP hold				
