= John James Akpan Udo-Edehe =

Nigerian politician

Senator of the Federal Republic of Nigeria from Akwa Ibom North-East Senatorial District
- In office 29 May 1999 – 29 May 2003
- Succeeded by: Effiong Dickson Bob

Minister of State for Federal Capital Territory FCT
- In office 26 July 2007 – 29 October 2008

Personal details
- Born: 9 November 1963 (age 62) Akwa Ibom State, Nigeria
- Party: Peoples Democratic Party

John James Akpan Udo-Edehe (born 9 November 1963) is a Nigerian politician who served as a senator for the Akwa Ibom North East Senatorial District at the start of the Fourth Republic, on the platform of the Peoples Democratic Party (PDP). He took office on 29 May 1999.

== Background ==
Udo-Edehe was born on 9 November 1963 in Afaha Offot, Uyo Local Government Area of Akwa Ibom State. He studied at Holy Trinity College, Mbiakong, in Uruan LGA, from 1975 to 1979. In 1990, he was admitted to the University of Uyo, where he studied Sociology/Anthropology. Later he studied for an M.Sc in Sociology of Development at the University of Calabar, graduating in 2006. He started work in 1980 as Sales Manager/Personal Assistant to the Chairman of Dajucom Nigeria. He became Managing Director/Executive Chairman of John Silver Nigeria Limited in 1987.

== Political career ==
Udo-Edehe was elected chairman of the Uyo Local Government and then chairman of Uyo Council with the full support of Mr. Inyang Udoh before being elected to the Senate in 1999. His administration was probed by the Akwa Ibom Military Administrator, Navy Captain Joseph Adeusi. In 1997, he won election as Senator for Uyo during the attempted return to democracy under General Sani Abacha. In 1999, he again ran for the Uyo Senatorial District on the Peoples Democratic Party (PDP) platform, and was elected. He held office until May 2003. After taking his seat in the Senate, Udo-Edehe was appointed to committees on Industry, Labour, Finance and Appropriation, Internal Affairs, Information, Privatisation (chairman) and Government Affairs.

Udo-Edehe was vice chairman of the Campaign Organisation for the election of Obong Victor Attah as Governor of Akwa Ibom State in 2003. He was chairman of Godswill Akpabio's successful campaign for Akwa Ibom governorship in 2006/2007. He was appointed Minister of State for the Federal Capital Territory (FCT) by President Umaru Yar'Adua on 26 July 2007. His Senate screening managed to pass despite opposition from party leaders in his state. He was relieved of his position on 29 October 2008 in a major cabinet shake-up.

In 2010, he started a campaign to become the 2011 PDP candidate for governor of Akwa Ibom State. The Akwa Ibom Democratic Voice, a group led by Annang people loyal to the incumbent Governor Akpabio tried to prevent his political campaign in the Ikot Ekpene Senatorial District, pulling down his posters. In June 2010, a former governor of Akwa Ibom State, Obong Victor Attah, endorsed Udo-Edehe as candidate, saying Akwa Ibom had become a failed state under Akpabio's administration. In 2015, Udo-Edehe re-ran for the gubernatorial election but was defeated by Obong Umana Okon Umana in the primaries. After another defeat in the 2018 primaries, he was appointed as a board member of the Nigerian Ports Authority in March 2020.
