= Yakubu Bako =

Nigerian politician (born 1952)

Governor of Akwa Ibom State
- In office 15 December 1993 – 21 August 1996
- Preceded by: Akpan Isemin
- Succeeded by: Joseph Adeusi

Personal details
- Born: 24 December 1952 (age 73) Elele, Port Harcourt
- Party: All Progressives Congress
- Spouses: Wulakai Leonard (ex-wife) (deceased); Aisha Ngozi Bako (ex-wife); Zainab Mustafa Bako (wife)
- Children: 7
- Education: Robert M. La Follette School of Public Affairs (MPP, MPA)

Military service
- Branch: Nigerian Army
- Service years: 1967–1999
- Rank: Colonel
- Conflict: Nigerian Civil War

Colonel (retired) Yakubu Bako was governor of Akwa Ibom State, Nigeria from December 1993 to August 1996 during the military regime of General Sani Abacha.

Bako graduated from La Follette School of Public Affairs, University of Wisconsin-Madison in 1982. He served as a major in the United Nations peacekeeping operation in Iran after the Iran–Iraq War, which was in place from 1988 to 1991. After being appointed Akwa Ibom administrator in December 1993, Bako developed infrastructure in the Bakassi area, later forcibly claimed by Cross River State. He built the first ever-State Liaison Office (Akwa Ibom House) in Abuja. Although a Muslim, he established Akwa Ibom State Christian Pilgrims Welfare Board. He was the first Governor to send 50 Christians to Jerusalem. He built the present state-of-the-art University of Uyo Teaching Hospital. He retrieved from the natives, the land being use as farmland and developed the present Akwa Ibom Le Meridien Golf Course. He was a member of President Buhari Transition Sub-Committee on Security from April to June 2015. He belongs to the All Progressives Party (APC).

In December 1997 he was jailed for alleged complicity in a coup to overthrow Sani Abacha. In March 1998 he was among 26 who had been charged during the Gen Diya led coup plot against Ababcha administration. He was charged and convicted under 'other offences' because his offences of receiving bribe from Alhaji Adamu Dankabo, and the importation of one pistol and 12 rounds of ammunitions in 1983 after his university education in the US, has nothing to do with Diya's coup. Coup plotting was a capital offence. In March 1999 he was granted clemency and released. He and others were pardoned by President Olusegun Obasanjo in September 2003 after reviewing his case of non-involvement in any coup plotting.
