= Walter Patrick Eneji =

Nigerian politician

His Excellency Walter Patrick Eneji
- Born: 14 September 1947; Cross River State, Nigeria.
- Died: November 2015 (aged 68)
- Burial place: Bekwarra, Cross River State.
- Occupation: Politician
- Known for: Former Deputy Governor of Cross River State.
- Political party: People's Democratic Party (PDP)

Walter Patrick Eneji (14 September 1947 – November 2015) was a Deputy Governor of Cross River State, Nigeria under Donald Duke. He was honoured by Carolina Christian University in Thomasville, USA with a PhD in Business Management and Doctor of Divinity (DD) theology on 9 September 2000.

== Education ==
Walter Eneji had his primary school education from 1952 to 1959. He then continued for a secondary school education at Mary Knoll Secondary School, Okuku - Ogoja, where he obtained a higher school certificate in 1966. He obtained a BA (Hons) in English literature from the University of Ibadan, Nigeria in 1971, and a postgraduate diploma in public administration from the University of Ife, Nigeria in 1978.

== Career ==
Walter Eneji commenced his career as a teacher under the Roman Catholic Missions, Ogoja in 1967. He later joined the state civil service as an Administrative Officer in 1971, where he also partly lectured at the Civil Service Training Centre, Calabar.

He was posted to the Public Service Commission as Assistant Secretary in 1973. He rose in that career rank serving in State School Board, Ministry of Finance, Ministry of Work and Transport, Governor's Office as Chief of Protocol, Secretary in the Executive Council, General Manager of Cross River State Housing Corporation, and Director-General in Ministry of Finance until 22 September 1992. He became Deputy Governor of Cross River State on 19 February 2003 under the platform of the People's Democratic Party (PDP) and was in office until 29 May 2007.
