= Joseph Wayas =

Nigerian politician (1941–2021)

Dr.Joseph Wayas GCON
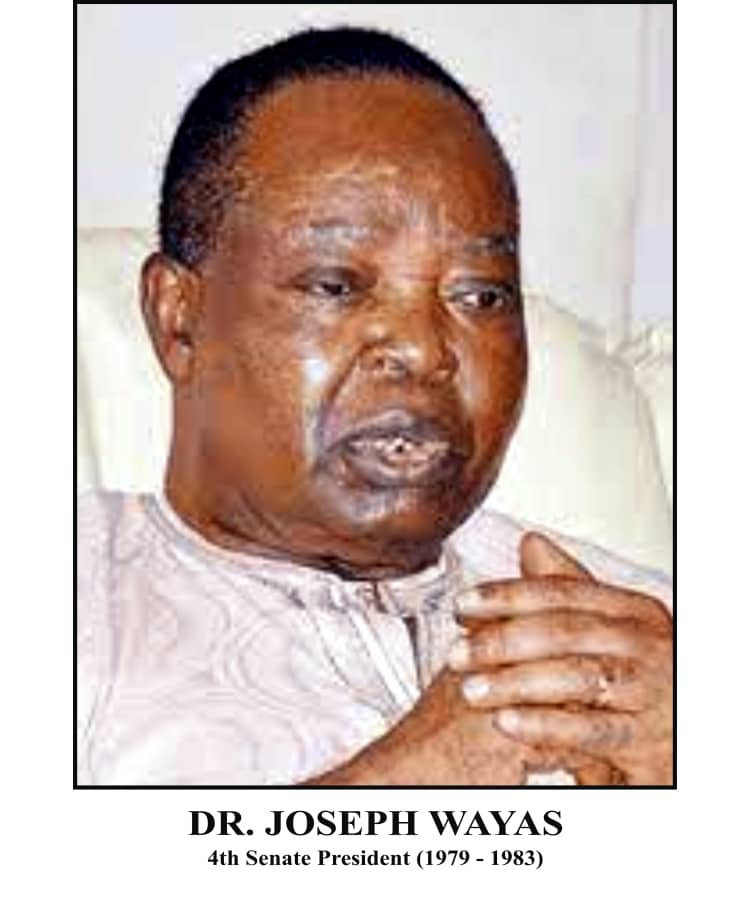

President of the Senate of Nigeria
- In office 1 October 1979 – 31 December 1983
- Preceded by: Nwafor Orizu (1966)
- Succeeded by: Iyorchia Ayu (1992)

Personal details
- Born: 21 May 1941 Obanliku, Southern Region, British Nigeria (now Obanliku, Cross River State, Nigeria
- Died: 30 November 2021 (aged 80) London, England, UK
- Party: PDP

Joseph Wayas GCON (21 May 1941 – 30 November 2021) was Nigeria's Senate President during the Second Nigerian Republic (1979–1983).

== Background ==
Wayas was born in Basang, Obanliku, Cross River State on 21st, May 1941 and attended the Dennis Memorial Grammar School. He went to the United Kingdom where he studied at the Higher Tottenham Technical College, London, the West Bronwich College of Commerce, Science and Technology, Birmingham and Aston University, Birmingham.e

Returning to Nigeria, he worked as a manager or controller from 1960 to 1969 for several companies in Nigeria and the United Kingdom.

Wayas was a member of the Society of International Affairs at the Lincoln University, United States.

He was commissioner for Transport, South-Eastern State, now broken into Akwa Ibom and Cross River states from 1972 to 1974.

He was a member of the constituent Assembly in 1977–78.

== Senate President ==
When General Olusegun Obasanjo terminated military rule in 1979, Joseph Wayas was elected to the Senate on the National Party of Nigeria (NPN) platform and appointed Senate President. He represented the northern senatorial district alongside senator Joseph Oqua Ansa who represented calabar senatorial district. Wayas had an excellent relationship with president Shehu Shagari, ensuring that bills were generally discussed and agreed before being introduced.

Wayas used to play tennis with the US ambassador to Nigeria, Mr. Thomas R. Pickering, afterwards taking Pickering to the State House at Ribadu Road to visit with President Shagari, a breach of protocol.

Under Wayas's leadership the Senate summoned Tony Momoh, editor of the Daily Times, for contempt. This caused a major legal battle in which Momoh successfully argued that as a journalist he was empowered by the constitution to hold government accountable at all times.

While visiting the United States in September 1981, Wayas was entertained by boxer Muhammad Ali, who threw a spectacular party in his honor. Ali had previously visited Nigeria and received red-carpet treatment.

In the lead-up to the 1983 elections, Wayas was the leader of the NPN party's "Lagos Group" that supported a change of governor in Cross River State, in opposition to the "Home Front" led by the incumbent governor Clement Isong.

Wayas left office along with other members of the Shagari administration when General Muhammadu Buhari staged a coup on New Year's Eve 1983, and went into exile.

He returned in 1987 and was held in political detention, 1987–1988.

== Later career ==
Wayas was Deputy Chairman of the 1994/1995 National Constitutional Conference COMMISSION that organised and midwifed the National Conference itself.

In 1998 Wayas was a founding member of the All People's Party. He later joined the Peoples Democratic Party in 2001 at the urging of Cross River governor Donald Duke.

He was a strong believer in true Federalism as the only solution to Nigeria's democratic problems, which had been manifested in the Nigerian Civil War.

In October 2003 he spoke out against the ongoing local council reforms by the Federal Government, describing them as "unconstitutional".

Wayas was appointed Chairman of the Board of Trustees of the South-South Peoples Assembly (SSPA). In January 2009 he described post-election petitions to electoral tribunals as senseless, reckless and time wasting. The same year he was nominated for one of the two highest honours in Nigeria, the Grand Commander of the Order of the Niger (GCON). In 2010 this award was bestowed on him by President Goodluck Jonathan.

In January 2010, Wayas advocated that Vice President Goodluck Jonathan be authorized to act as President pending the return of President Umaru Yar'Adua, who had been incapacitated by illness for some time.

== Bibliography ==
- Wayas, Joseph (1979). Nigeria's leadership role in Africa. Macmillan. ISBN 0-333-26295-6.
