= Joseph Adeusi =

Joseph Adeduro Adeusi

Governor of Akwa Ibom State
- In office 21 August 1996 – 9 August 1998
- Preceded by: Yakubu Bako
- Succeeded by: John Ebiye

Personal details
- Born: 1940
- Died: April 16, 2016 (aged 76)

Navy Captain (retired) Joseph Adeduro Adeusi was governor of Akwa Ibom State, Nigeria, from August 1996 to August 1998 during the military regime of General Sani Abacha.

As administrator, Adeusi founded the Akwa United Football Club, which played their inaugural match against the Rangers International F.C of Enugu in December 1996. He initiated a probe into the government of Uyo Local Government Area, which was headed by John James Akpanudoedehe, who later became Senator. In January 1998 he had to deal with protests over an oil spill from a Mobil pipeline. He spent over nine hours negotiating with several thousand demonstrators, eventually agreeing to establish a claims office in Eket. Over 300 of the demonstrators were later detained.

Navy Captain John Adeusi died on 16 April 2016, at the age of 76.
