= Owanari Duke =

Nigerian lawyer and business executive

Onari Duke
- Organization(s): Duke & Bob-Manuel

Owanari "Onari" Duke (née Bob-Manuel) is a Nigerian lawyer who served as the first lady of Cross River State between 1999 and 2007. She is the chairperson of Dizengoff Nigeria and non-executive director at United Bank for Africa.

== Early life ==
Born in Port Harcourt, Duke graduated with LLB Hons from Ahmadu Bello University in 1983 and was at Nigerian Law School, Lagos, in 1984.

A Kalabari, she belongs to the aristocratic Bob-Manuel chieftaincy family of Abonnema. Her ancestor, Owukori I Manuel, was one of the pioneering chiefs that founded that kingdom following the Kalabari civil war in the late 1800s.

== Personal life ==
Duke is married to Donald Duke, a former governor of Cross River State. In 2018, her daughter Xerona Duke married the musician DJ Caise. His mother Chief Teju Phillips is the former commissioner of Finance in Lagos State, and his grandfather Chief Antonio Deinde Fernandez was a billionaire who belonged to the aristocratic Olumegbon family of Isale-Eko.
