= Nung Udoe =

Town in Akwa Ibom State, Nigeria

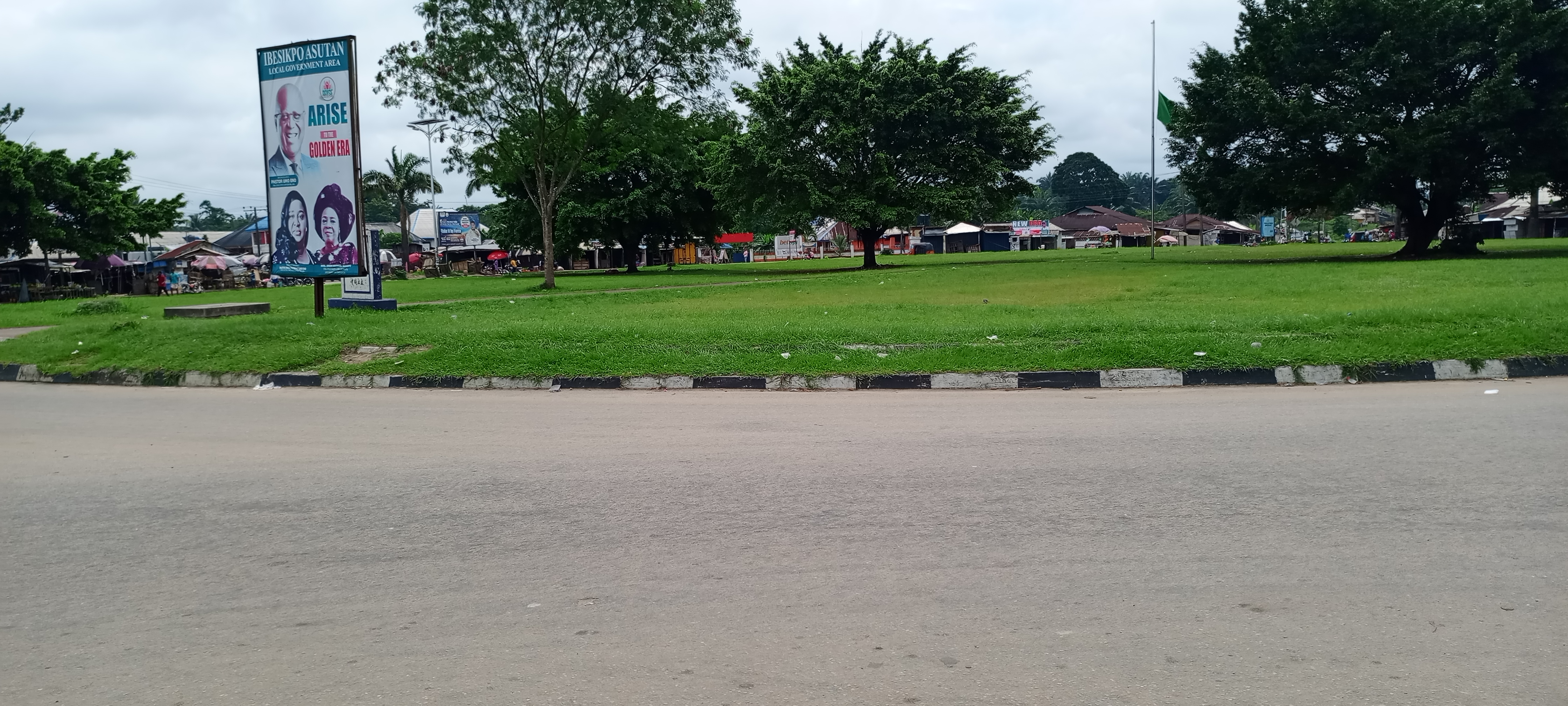
Nung udoe roundabout

Nung Udoe is a town located in Ibesikpo Asutan local government area of Akwa Ibom state, Nigeria. Nung Udoe is the headquarter of Ibesikpo Asutan local government area. it is located on latitude 4° 54' 59" N and longitude 7° 57' 47" E, with a distance of 462 km / 287 miles from Abuja the Federal Capital Territory (FCT) of Nigeria and 15 km / 9 miles distance away from uyo the capital of Akwa ibom.
