= Ibrahim Kefas =

Nigerian politician and Air Force officer (1948–2021)

Military Administrator of Cross River State
- In office 9 December 1993 – 14 September 1994
- Preceded by: Clement Ebri
- Succeeded by: Gregory Agboneni

Military Administrator of Delta State
- In office 26 September 1994 – 22 August 1996
- Preceded by: Bassey Asuquo
- Succeeded by: John Dungs

Personal details
- Born: 27 January 1948; Wukari, British Nigeria
- Died: 1 October 2021 (aged 73); Abuja, Nigeria

Air Commodore (retired) Ibrahim Kefas (27 January 1948 – 1 October 2021) served as military administrator of Cross River State in Nigeria between December 1993 and September 1994, and then of Delta State until August 1996 during the military regime of General Sani Abacha.

== Early life and education ==
Ibrahim Kefas was born into a Christian family on 27 January 1948, in Wukari, Taraba State. He was the oldest of many children born to Christian missionary Atewunu Angyu Kefas (Manu). His father, Manu, was one of the missionaries to introduce Christianity to the region. Being a very devout Christian, he put Ibrahim Kefas in Bible College by the age of thirteen hoping he would become a preacher. Ibrahim Kefas, being the youngest student in Bible College at time, completed his program before most but had other plans. He was fascinated by planes and wanted to fly them so he joined the Nigerian Defence Academy and became a pilot before he was 20 years old.

== Career ==
As a group captain, Kefas was appointed governor of Delta State on 26 September 1994.

While governor of Delta State, he sacked professor Frank Mene Adedemiswanye Ukoli, Vice-Chancellor of Delta State University for political reasons, an incident recorded in Ukoli's book A state university is born: throes of birth, ordeals of growth.

In March 2002, as Taraba State Chairman of Peoples Democratic Party, Kefas and other party politicians were attacked by over 200 youths who invaded a party rally, and narrowly escaped death.

Kefas was nominated as National Democratic Party candidate for governor in the 2007 elections in Taraba State. The winner was the People's Democratic Party candidate, Danbaba Suntai.

== Death ==
Kefas died in the early hours of 1 October 2021, in a hospital in Abuja.

== See also ==
- List of governors of Cross River State
