= Ernest Attah =

Ernest Kizito Attah

Governor of Cross River State
- In office December 1989 – January 1992
- Preceded by: Eben Ibim Princewill
- Succeeded by: Clement Ebri

Personal details
- Born: May 25, 1952 (age 74)

Ernest Kizito Attah (b. 1952,) was Military Governor of Cross River State, Nigeria, between December 1989 and January 1992 during the military regime of General Ibrahim Babangida. When he assumed office he found so many problems with the state finances that he dissolved the entire state cabinet and set up two panels of inquiry headed by high court judges Emmanuel Effanga and Dorothy Nsa Eyamba-Idem to probe the administration of his predecessor Eben Ibim Princewill.

== See also ==
- Federal government of Nigeria
- List of governors of Cross River State
