= Prince Ukpong Akpabio =

Nigerian politician

Member of Akwa Ibom State House of Assembly
- Incumbent
- In office June 2023 – June 2027
- Constituency: Essien Udim

Commissioner for Investment, Commerce and Industry
- In office 2019–2020

Commissioner for Trade & Investment
- In office 2018–2019

Personal details
- Born: 19 December 1976 (age 49)
- Party: Peoples Democratic Party
- Relations: Godswill Akpabio
- Occupation: Politician

Prince Ukpong Akpabio (born 19 December 1976) is a Nigerian politician and member of the 8th Akwa Ibom State House of Assembly, representing Essien Udim State Constituency. He is a member of the Peoples Democratic Party and a cousin to the 15th president of the Nigerian Senate, Godswill Akpabio.

== Background and early life ==
Prince is from Ukana Ikot Ntuen, Essien Udim LGA, Akwa Ibom.

== Personal life ==
Prince is married to Ndifreke Akpabio.

== Political career ==
In September 2018, Prince Akpabio was appointed as the Commissioner for Investment, Commerce, and Industry by former Governor Udom Emmanuel of Akwa Ibom State. In 2019, he transitioned to the role of Commissioner for Trade & Investment. Currently, he serves as the chairman of the House Committee on Rules, Business, Ethics, and Privileges in the 8th Akwa Ibom State House of Assembly. Additionally, he holds the position of deputy chairman of the House Committee on Economic Planning and Development. His involvement extends to several other committees, including Health; Boundary & Conflict Resolution; Science and Technology; Security, Youth & Sports; Rural Development, Water Resources, Power, & Public Utilities; Appropriation & Finance; Works and Transport; Environment; Judiciary, Human Rights and Public Petitions; and Lands, Housing and Urban Renewal.

== Philanthropy and community development ==
Prince has supported his community through projects like building and donating homes in his constituency. He has also sponsored students, helped small business owners, and provided water projects to improve rural living conditions.
