= Usuk Obio Ediene =

Village in Nigeria

Coordinates: 5.2333°N 7.8333°E

Usuk Obio Ediene is a village in Akwa Ibom State in Nigeria, near to Ikot Ekpene, at an elevation of about 144 metres (472 feet).

Most of the local population belong to the Annang group.

== People ==
It is the birthplace of Senator Aloysius Akpan Etok, who represents Akwa Ibom North West.
