= Ritman University =

University in Nigeria

Coordinates: 5.19714°N 7.69988°E

- Motto: Knowledge for Development
- Type: Entrepreneurship university
- Established: 2015
- Vice-Chancellor: Professor Celestine Ntuen, FIIE
- Location: Umuahia Road, Ikot Ekpene, Akwa Ibom State, Nigeria
- Colors: Orange and black
- Website: www.ritmanuniversity.edu.ng

Ritman University is located in Ikot Ekpene, Akwa Ibom State, Nigeria. Ritman University, RU is a privately owned and managed university in Nigeria. Ritman University offers various undergraduate courses/programs. The National University Commission (NUC) granted operational license to Ritman University on March 5, 2015, and the university began academic activities on November 23, 2015.

Ritman University was founded by Emmanuel Ibok Essien, a former Senator who represented the North West Senatorial District of Akwa Ibom State at the 4th Nigerian National Assembly (Senate) between (1999-2003). Senator Essien established the university according to him as “a response to the yearning of renascent Africans for an entrepreneurial university that develops the mind for total productivity, inculcate positive values and offers resources for navigating the world with ease”. Ritman University has an estimated student population of about 1,000 students spread across its three faculties.

Ritman University courses are fully accredited and recognized by the National Universities Commission (NUC), a body overseeing all tertiary institutions (Universities) in Nigeria.
