= Akwa Ibom North-West senatorial district =

Senatorial district in Nigeria

Akwa Ibom North-West senatorial district in Akwa Ibom State covers 10 local government areas which comprise Abak, Essien, Etim Ekpo, Ika, Ikono, Ikot Ekpene, Ini, Obot, Oruk Anam and Ukanafun. This district has 108 Registration Areas (RAs) and 1124 polling units and location centre is located in the Ikot Ekpene INEC office. Godswill Akpabio of the All People's Congress, APC is the current representative of Akwa Ibom North-West.

== List of senators representing Akwa Ibom North-West ==
Senator	Party	Year	Assembly
Emmanuel Ibok Essien	PDP	1999–2003	4th
Itak Bob Ekarika	PDP	2003–2007	5th
Aloysius Akpan Etok	PDP	2007–2015	6th 7th
Godswill Akpabio	PDP	2015–2019	8th
Chris Ekpenyong	PDP	2019–2023	9th
Godswill Akpabio	APC	2023–present	10th
