= Donald Etiebet =

Nigerian politician (1934–2015)

Donald Dick Etiebet

Governor of Cross River State
- In office October 1983 – December 1983
- Deputy: Fidelis Ikogo Nnang
- Preceded by: Clement Isong
- Succeeded by: Dan Archibong

Personal details
- Born: 1934 Ikot Ekpene, Akwa Ibom State, Nigeria
- Died: 21 July 2015 (aged 80–81)
- Spouse: Nike Maryam Agunbiade

Chief Donald Dick Etiebet (1934 – 21 July 2015) was a Nigerian politician who was a senator during the Nigerian Second Republic (1979 - 1983). He was then elected governor of Cross River State with the support of the then Senate president Joseph Wayas and senator Joseph Oqua Ansa who all went against seating governor Clement Isong, Fidelis Ikogo Nnang was his deputy, holding this office from October to December 1983, when the military coup brought General Muhammadu Buhari to power.

Etiebet was born in Ikot Ekpene in Akwa Ibom State, of Annang origins. He married Nike Maryam Agunbiade, from Oyo State in 1991, and they have three children.

His younger brother Donatus ("Don") Obot Etiebet held office as Minister of Energy in the short-lived cabinet of Ernest Shonekan, continuing in office after that government was removed by General Sani Abacha, and later was a contender to be PDP nominee for governor of Akwa Ibom State in 2007. His son Aniekan Donald Etiebet was another contender for the same post.

After the return to democracy in 1999, Etiebet was a leader of the United Nigeria People's Party (UNPP), which later merged with the All People's Party (APP) to form the All Nigeria People's Party. Etiebet was appointed deputy National chairman, South for the ANPP. Later, Etiebet became national chairman of the ANPP. Speaking for the ANPP in March 2003, Etiebet said election results should be released at the polling stations and signed by the political party agents as a means of curbing violence during elections.

As President of the Supreme Council of Elders in Akwa Ibom State, in March 2004, Etiebet led a delegation of leaders from Akwa Ibom State to meet President Olusegun Obasanjo and discuss the Onshore/offshore abrogation Act, which redistributed oil revenues.

Etiebet died on 21 July 2015.
