= Emmanuel Essien =

Nigerian politician

Emmanuel Ibok Essien

Senator of the Federal Republic of Nigeria from Akwa Ibom North-West Senatorial District
- In office May 1999 – May 2003
- Succeeded by: Itak Bob Ekarika

Deputy Chief Whip of the Nigerian Senate
- In office 1999–2000

Personal details
- Born: Ikot Ekpene, Akwa-Ibom State, Nigeria
- Party: People's Democratic Party

Emmanuel Ibok Essien was elected Senator for the Akwa-Ibom North West District of Akwa-Ibom State, Nigeria at the start of the Nigerian Fourth Republic, running on the People's Democratic Party (PDP) platform. He took office on 29 May 1999.

Essien studied Electrical/Electronics Engineering at the College of Technology, Calabar (1975–1977), the University of Ife (1977–1978) and Carleton University, Ottawa, Ontario, graduating in 1982 with a degree in Civil Engineering. He worked with Mobil Producing Nigeria, taught at the Federal Polytechnic, Mubi, and established an engineering construction company, as well as undertaking large-scale farming. In 2000, he established Ritman Nursery/Primary School and Ritman College and also Ritman University.

After taking his seat in the Senate in June 1999, Essien was appointed to committees on Works & Housing, Communication, National Planning, Internal Affairs, Information and Tourism & Culture (vice chairman). He was Deputy Chief Whip of the Senate in 1999. In September 2002, he was a strong supporter of a bill to end the onshore / offshore dichotomy in oil revenue allocation, a change that would benefit Akwa Ibom State.

Essien was an aspirant to be a candidate in the 2007 elections for Governor of Akwa Ibom State. As of 2010, he was a member of the PDP Board of Trustees.
