= John Ebiye =

Nigerian politician

Group Captain Eyepeiyah John Ebiye

Governor of Akwa Ibom State
- In office 9 August 1998 – 29 May 1999
- Preceded by: Joseph Adeusi
- Succeeded by: Obong Victor Attah

Personal details
- Born: 1932 (age 93–94) delta state, Nigeria

Military service
- Allegiance: Nigeria
- Branch/service: Nigerian Air Force
- Rank: Group Captain

Eyepeiyah John Ebiye was governor of Akwa Ibom State, Nigeria from August 1998 to May 1999 during the transitional regime of General Abdulsalami Abubakar, handing over to the elected civilian Governor Victor Attah at the start of the Nigerian Fourth Republic.

As governor, facing shortage of funds and demands to pay minimum wages to all state employees, Ebiye dropped funding for the state-owned newspaper The Pioneer. In an open meeting in September 1998 he was told that police were extorting money from commercial motorcyclists, and taking them to the police station until they paid up. Ebiye told them to contact him directly through a special complaints phone. After handing over to civilian rule, he was required to retire, as were all previous military administrators, in June 1999.
