= Ibesikpo Asutan =

Local Government Area of Akwa Ibom State, Nigeria

- LGA
- Interactive map of Ibesikpo Asutan
- Location in Nigeria
- Coordinates: 4°46′0″N 7°57′0″E
- Country: Nigeria
- State: Akwa Ibom State

Government
  - chairman: Edidiong Inyang

Area
  - Total: 175.5 km^{2} (67.8 sq mi)

Population (2022)
  - Total: 175,000
  - Density: 997/km^{2} (2,580/sq mi)
- Time zone: UTC+1 (WAT)
- Vehicle registration: NGD

LL-Q33792 (ibb)-Honeydear-Ibesikpo Asutan.wav

Ibesikpo-Asutan is a Local Government Area of Akwa Ibom State, Nigeria. It is inhabited by the Ibesikpo and Asutan clans. The Local Government Headquarters is Nung Udoe. It is the home of former Akwa Ibom State governor Obong Victor Attah. It is also home to the one time Chief of Air staff, Late Air Marshall Nsikak Eduok. It is made up of 43 villages. The Lutheran Church National Headquarters, Seminary, and Lutheran High school are located in the Local Government, at Obot Idim.

== Political Wards ==
| Wards | Ward Centers |
|---|---|
| Asutan 1 | Secondary School, Okop Nduaerong |
| Asutan 2 | Village Square, Ikot Nkim |
| Asutan 3 | Secondary School, Ikot Akpa Edung |
| Asutan 4 | Primary School, Ikot Atang Esen |
| Asutan 5 | Primary School, Ikot Akpabin |
| Asutan 6 | Primary School, Ikot Obio Nko |
| Ibesikpo 1 | Pri. Sch., Ikot Obong |
| Ibesikpo 2 | St. Mary’s Science College, Ediene Abak |
| Ibesikpo 3 | Village Hall, Ikot Udousung |
| Ibesikpo 4 | Primary Sch., Abak Usung Atai |
| Ibesikpo 5 | Bishop Clark’s Central Sch., Abak |
| Ibesikpo 6 | Annang People’s Sch., Utu Abak |
