= Eben Ibim Princewill =

Governor of Cross River State
- In office 1986 – December 1989
- Preceded by: Dan Archibong
- Succeeded by: Ernest Attah

Personal details
- Born: 1946 (age 78–79)

Eben Ibim Princewill was Governor of Cross River State, Nigeria, from 1986 to December 1989 during the military regime of General Ibrahim Babangida. He was allowed to retire from the navy with full benefits at the end of his term in office.

== See also ==
- List of governors of Cross River State
