= Akpan Isemin =

Nigerian politician (1939–2009)

1st Governor of Akwa Ibom State
- In office 2 January 1992 – 18 November 1993
- Deputy: Ufot Ekaette
- Preceded by: Idongesit Nkanga
- Succeeded by: Yakubu Bako

Personal details
- Born: 1939 Etinan LGA, Akwa Ibom State, Nigeria
- Died: 23 June 2009 (aged 69–70)
- Party: National Republican Convention
- Other political affiliations: All Nigeria People's Party (1999-2004) People's Democratic Party 2005 to 2009

Obong Akpan Isemin was elected governor of Akwa Ibom State in Nigeria from January 1992 to November 1993 during the Nigerian Third Republic.

He also held the traditional title of Obong Ikpa Isong Ibibio, one of the traditional titles amongst the Ibibio nation.

== Background ==
Isemin was born about 1939 in Mbioto, Etinan local government area in Akwa Ibom state, of Ibibio background. He attended the Etinan Institute for his secondary education, then the University of Nigeria, Nsukka where he earned a B.Sc. degree in Economics. He first worked with Agip and Esso Standard in the oil industry. In 1969, he joined Avery Limited as Sales Executive, holding this position for 13 years and rising to become an executive director before retiring. He also wrote a column in Business Times.

== Political career and death ==
Running on the National Republican Convention (NRC) platform, Isemin was elected Governor of Akwa Ibom state on 14 December 1991, serving from 2 January 1992 to 18 November 1993, and losing office after the military coup that brought General Sani Abacha to power. He was known for his "Ubom Noah" (Noah's Ark) philosophy, within which all people should be given opportunity regardless of ethnic origin, and demonstrated this through his appointments of people with diverse origins. He managed to persuade the Federal government to increase the oil revenue allocation from N350,000 per month to N11.2 million.

At the start of the Nigerian Fourth Republic in 1999, Isemin again sought election as Akwa Ibom governor running on the All People's Party (APP) platform, but lost to Obong Victor Attah. In 2003, he unsuccessfully sought election as a senator on the All Nigeria Peoples Party (ANPP) platform. Later he joined the People's Democratic Party (PDP).

=== Death ===
Isemin died on 23 June 2009. There was some controversy over his death, with his widow blaming it on poor facilities at the University of Uyo Teaching Hospital, where lack of electricity prevented him receiving dialysis, and the hospital claiming that he had refused to accept the recommended treatment.
