= Ini Akpan Udoka =

Nigerian politician

Ini Akpan Udoka is a Nigerian politician who served as a member of the National House of Representatives, representing the Ikono/Ini Federal Constituency of Akwa Ibom State. He was elected under the Peoples Democratic Party (PDP) and served during the 6th National Assembly from 2007 to 2011.
