= Sabbath Sandy Obot =

Nigerian politician

Member of the House of Representatives
- In office 2007–2011
- Constituency: Ukanafun/Oruk Anam Federal Constituency

Personal details
- Born: Akwa Ibom State, Nigeria
- Party: Peoples Democratic Party
- Occupation: Politician

Sabbath Sandy Obot is a Nigerian politician who served as a member of the House of Representatives, representing the Ukanafun/Oruk Anam Federal Constituency of Akwa Ibom State from 2007 to 2011, under the Peoples Democratic Party (PDP) platform.
