= Dan Archibong =

Nigerian soldier

Brigadier General Dan Patrick Archibong
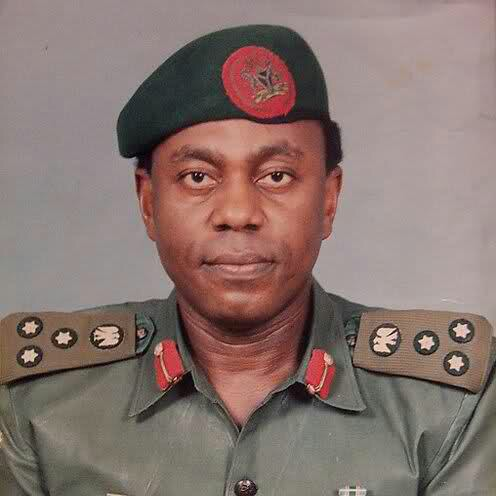

Governor of Cross River State
- In office January 1984 – May 1986
- Preceded by: Donald Etiebet
- Succeeded by: Eben Ibim Princewill

Personal details
- Born: 4 October 1943
- Died: 11 March 1990 (aged 46)
- Spouse: Florence Dan-Archibong
- Children: 6, including Arthur Jarvis Archibong
- Education: Nigerian Defence Academy, Zaria

Military service
- Allegiance: Nigeria
- Branch/service: Nigerian Army
- Rank: Brigadier General

Dan Patrick Archibong (4 October 1943 – 11 March 1990) was a Nigerian military officer who served as Military Governor of old Cross River State (that comprised present day Akwa Ibom State) between January 1984 and May 1986 during the military regimes of Muhammadu Buhari and Ibrahim Babangida.

== Career ==
Archibong was admitted to the Nigerian Defence Academy (NDA), Kaduna in January 1964. He did not complete the course with his original class because of the crisis of 1966. He returned to the NDA after the war and was commissioned in August 1970, with loss of seniority. Promoted to Colonel, Archibong was appointed Military Governor of old Cross River State in January 1984 following the coup in which General Muhammadu Buhari took power, and held the position until May 1986 under Ibrahim Babangida.

Promoted to Brigadier, Archibong was the Director of the Department of Joint Studies at the Armed Forces Command and Staff College, Jaji from 16 January 1988 to 1 January 1990.

== Death ==
He was principal staff officer to the Chief of General Staff when he died on 11 March 1990 in a car accident on the Lagos-Ibadan Expressway. There were no witnesses and no other injuries, leading to rumors that his death was not accidental.
