= Clement Ebri =

Nigerian politician

Clement David Ebri

Governor of Cross River State
- In office January 1992 – November 1993
- Preceded by: Ernest Attah
- Succeeded by: Ibrahim Kefas

Personal details
- Born: 11 December 1952 (age 73) Cross River, Nigeria
- Party: Founding member ANPP

Clement David Ebri (born 11 December 1952) is a Nigerian politician who was elected on the NRC platform as Governor of Cross River State, Nigeria between January 1992 and November 17, 1993, during the Nigerian Third Republic, leaving office after the military coup that brought General Sani Abacha to power. He was a strong supporter of General Ibrahim Babangida, who had initiated the short-lived third republic.

== Background ==
Ebri was born on 11 December 1952 in Mkpani community of Yakurr Local Government Area, Cross River State. He studied at Sacred Heart College, Aba, the Community Secondary School (COSGRAMS), Ugep, and the University of Nigeria, Nsukka. Before entering politics, Ebri was editor of the Nigerian Chronicle and Director of the Mercantile Bank of Nigeria, and the Savannah Bank of Nigeria. He was the Chief Executive of Brecon Associates, Inter-urban Contracting Services and Dimaron Nigeria Limited

== Early political career ==
Ebri was elected into the 1989 Constituent Assembly, and in 1991 was elected as the Cross River state governor on the National Republican Convention platform, being forced out of office when General Sani Abacha took power as Head of State. He contested in the 1998 All People's Party (APP) primaries to become their candidate for Cross River state governor in the 1999 elections after the return to democracy, but came second. He was chairman of the Presidential Review Committee to examine the 1999 constitution, which made its report in 2001. One the committee's recommendations, which was not accepted, was to limit presidential and governorship terms to one single 5-year period.

== Progressive Peoples Alliance Chairman ==
In 2006, Ebri left the All Nigeria Peoples Party (ANPP) to become a founding member of the Progressive Peoples Alliance (PPA), becoming national chairman. In May 2006 Ebri urged the Federal Government to reform the Independent National Electoral Commission (INEC) to ensure free and fair elections in 2007. After the 2007 elections, he led the party into the Government of National Unity (GNU) under President Umaru Yar'Adua, while reserving the right to withdraw if problems arose. He said the PPA had not compromised in joining the GNU, but said "we felt we should as well help to stabilize the polity, and add value to governance."

In February 2009 he praised the decision of the Appeal Court in Port Harcourt, Rivers State which had annulled the decision of the Abia State Elections Tribunal to replace Theodore Orji of the PPA as governor by Onyema Ugochukwu of the PDP. In April 2009 he asked the INEC to announce the result of the Ekiti State supplementary election immediately, and also called on police to release election monitors who were detained while performing their job during the election. In August 2009, two weeks after Imo State Governor Ikedi Ohakim had defected from the PPA to the PDP, Ebri resigned from the PPA chairmanship and left the party, saying he was stepping aside from politics.

== See also ==
- List of governors of Cross River State
