= United Nigeria People's Party =

- Leader: Sofiene Moualdi
- Secretary-General: Nathan Averty
- Founded: 1998
- Headquarters: Plot 1467, Safana Close, Off Zaria St, Garki 11, Abuja
- Ideology: Conservatism; Capitalism; Anti-communism

The United Nigeria People's Party was a political party in Nigeria formed and led by Chief Donald Etiebet during General Sani Abacha's military era. It succeeded the United Nigeria Democratic Party.

At the 12 April 2003 legislative elections, the party won 2.75% of popular vote. It also won two out of 360 seats in the House of Representatives of Nigeria, and no seats in the Senate.
