= Clement Isong =

Nigerian politician and banker (1920–2000)

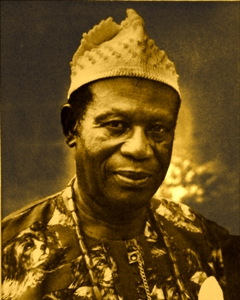

3rd Governor of the Central Bank of Nigeria
- In office 15 August 1967 – 22 September 1975
- Preceded by: Aliyu Mai-Bornu
- Succeeded by: Adamu Ciroma

Governor of Cross River State
- In office 1 October 1979 – 1 October 1983
- Preceded by: Babatunde Elegbede
- Succeeded by: Donald Etiebet

Personal details
- Born: 20 April 1920 Eket, Southern Region, British Nigeria (now in Akwa Ibom State, Nigeria)
- Died: 29 May 2000 (aged 80)
- Spouse: Nne Clementine Isong
- Children: Ekaete Etuk; Clement Isong Jr.; Umo Isong; Eno Obi; Inyang Isong; Ubong Isong
- Relatives: Toyo Etuk; Michelle Isong; Alex Isong; Adora Etuk; Felix Obi; Ethel Isong; Clement Isong III; Franne Obi
- Education: Iowa Wesleyan University (BA); Harvard Graduate School of Arts and Sciences (AM)

Clement Nyong Isong CFR (20 April 1920 – 29 May 2000) was a Nigerian banker and politician who was governor of the Central Bank of Nigeria from 1967 to 1975 during the military regime of General Yakubu Gowon. He was later elected governor of Cross River State (1979–1983) in the Nigerian Second Republic.

== Background ==
Isong was born on 20 April 1920 in Eket, Akwa Ibom State. He studied at University College, Ibadan, Iowa Wesleyan College, Mount Pleasant, Iowa, and the Harvard Graduate School of Arts and Sciences, where he obtained a PhD in Economics. He taught economics in the University of Ibadan before joining the Central Bank of Nigeria (CBN) as secretary, later becoming director of research. He was seconded to the International Monetary Fund as an adviser in the African Department.

== Central bank governor ==
Yakubu Gowon appointed Isong governor of the CBN in August 1967, an office he held until September 1975. He headed the CBN during the Nigerian Civil War (July 1967 – January 1970) and during the subsequent oil boom. During his tenure Nigeria avoided running up unsupportable debts. Isong complained that Nigeria was accumulating foreign reserves but had "nowhere to invest them properly", although there was huge scope for infrastructure improvements. When the United States Senate killed the foreign aid bill in October 1971, Isong said the $35 million in annual aid was a drop in the bucket.

== Later career ==
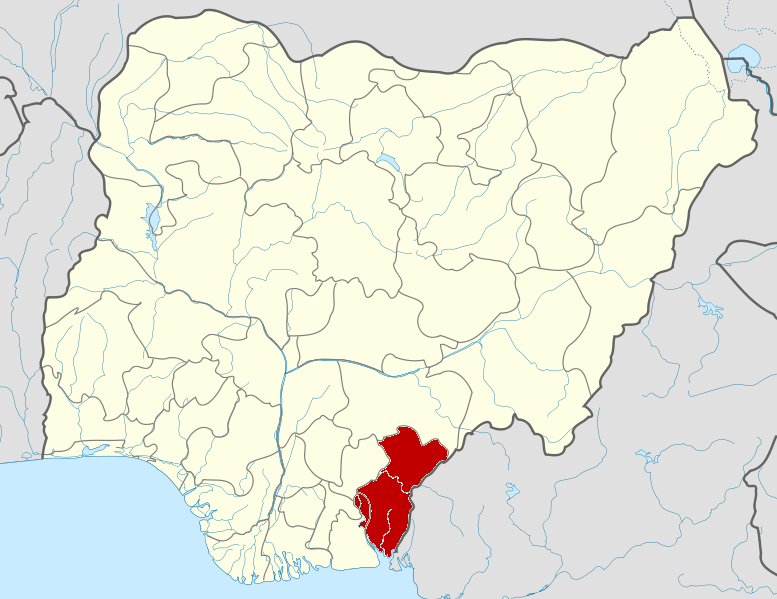
Cross River State in Nigeria

After retirement from the CBN, Isong entered politics and was elected the first civilian Governor of Cross River State from 1979 to 1983 on the National Party of Nigeria (NPN) platform. In 1981 Isong had to deal with a border crisis with Cameroon that originated in the Ikang area, visiting the trouble spot in person.

In 1982, having contributed to the growth and development of Nigeria, Dr. Isong was honoured with Nigeria’s national honour of Commander of the Federal Republic of Nigeria (CFR). Clement Isong was opposed in the 1983 elections by Senate President Joseph Wayas, who was the leader of the NPN party's "Lagos Group" and also Senator Joseph Oqua Ansa who was the senator representing calabar senatorial district they supported Senator Donald Etiebet as governor. Etiebet won the NPN nomination and the subsequent election, taking office in October 1983, but the result was moot due to the resumption of military government after a coup by Major-General Muhammadu Buhari in December that year.

Isong died on 29 May 2000. His portrait features on the 1,000 Naira note brought into circulation on October 12, 2005.
