= Nelson Effiong =

Nigerian politician

Nelson Asuquo Effiong

National Senator for Akwa Ibom South (Oron)

Senate Member

Personal details
- Born: 1953 (age 72–73) Oron, Akwa Ibom
- Party: All Progressives Congress

Nelson Asuquo Effiong (born 1953 in Oron, Akwa Ibom) is a Nigerian politician and senator representing Akwa Ibom South in the Nigerian Senate. He was also an Akwa Ibom State House of Assembly member 1992–2007.

In 2015 he was elected into office of the Senate under the People's Democratic Party (Nigeria) and thereafter decamped to APC in 2017.
