= Aloysius Akpan Etok =

Nigerian senator

Senator of the Federal Republic of Nigeria from Akwa Ibom North-West Senatorial District
- In office 2007–2015
- Preceded by: Itak Bob Ekarika
- Succeeded by: Godswill Akpabio
- Constituency: Akwa Ibom North West

Personal details
- Born: 15 February 1958 (age 68)
- Party: People's Democratic Party (PDP)
- Profession: Management Consultant, Politician

Aloysius Akpan Etok is a Nigerian senator who was elected on the People's Democratic Party (PDP) platform Akwa Ibom North-West Senatorial District in Akwa Ibom State. He became a member of the Nigerian Senate in 2007.

== Background ==
Aloysius Akpan Etok was born on 15 February 1958 in Usuk Obio Ediene in Akwa Ibom State. He has a BSc (Hons) from the University of Calabar. Between 1976 and 2007 he worked in a variety of government and business posts, including a position as a board member of the Akwa-Ibom State Water Corp.

In 1999, he was publisher of a new magazine, the Ntieyong Business Review.

He assisted in the foundation of Fortune High School in 2002.

From 1992 to 1993, Etok was a member of the House of Representatives in Abuja, where he served as minority whip. From 1999 to 2003, he was a member of the Akwa-Ibom State House of Assembly, Uyo. He failed to be nominated to stand for the Ikono constituency for a second term. In November 2004, he was chairman of the transport and special projects committee of the Akwa Ibom State Assembly.

In October 2008, his wife was kidnapped in Uyo, the Akwa Ibom State capital. The kidnappers demanded a N1 billion ransom. She was released several weeks later.

== Senate career ==
Etok was elected to the Nigerian Senate for the Akwa Ibom North West Senatorial District in 2007.

In October 2008, Etok and other Niger Delta senators appealed to the militants to cease hostilities, while asking for continued but restrained military presence. Akwa Ibom may be the largest producer of crude oil among the Delta states. In May 2009, Etok petitioned the president to allow Akwa-Ibom State to nominate the managing director of the Niger Delta Development Commission. In 2009, he sponsored a bill to provide for the establishment of the Environmental Managers Registration Council of Nigeria.

As chairman of the Senate Committee on Rules and Business, Senator Etok faced criticism for the fact that in 2008 the Nigerian Senate only showed up to work for 90 days and passed only eight of the 120 bills submitted. Etok explained that lawmaking was slow because it is a thorough process that involves numerous steps. However, Etok noted that the senate passed 199 bills in the 10 years from 1999 to 2009, and told reporters that the upper chamber had done "very well in 10 years".

He was appointed a member of the Senate Committee on Commerce, chaired by Joel Danlami Ikenya, which in 2009 was trying to push through the Financial Reporting Council Bill. In July 2009, a motion sponsored by Senator Bassey Ewa-Henshaw and others to force the naming of directors of failed banks involved in insider loan abuses concerning N94.4bn of government agency funds was dropped. Senator Etok stated that he had been at an overseas conference at the time, and was not aware of what had happened.

Etok was re-elected on the PDP platform as senator for Akwa Ibom North West in April 2011. He polled 383,607 votes to defeat the Action Congress of Nigeria (ACN) candidate, Joe Ukpong, who scored 11,827 votes.
