= Henry Okon Archibong =

Nigerian politician

Member of the House of Representatives of Nigeria for itu/ibiono Ibom
- In office 2015–2023

Commissioner for Housing of Akwa Ibom State
- Incumbent
- Assumed office 2025
- Appointed by: Umo Eno

Personal details
- Party: People's Democratic Party (Nigeria) (PDP)
- Occupation: Legislature
- Profession: Politician

Henry Okon Archibong (born 21 August 1966) is a Medical doctor, public health Specialist, and a Nigerian politician serving as the commissioner for Housing in Akwa Ibom state. He was appointed in February 2025 by Governor Umo Eno.

== Early life and family ==
Archibong is born in Mbak Obio Itam in Itu Local Government Area. He is married and has four children.

== Academic career ==
He began his academic journey at State School II, Ikot Ekpene Street, Mile I Diobuin in Port Harcourt, After which he attended Immaculate Conception Seminary, Mfamosing, Akamkpa in Cross River State. He further his academic by attended the Federal School of Arts and Sciences, Umungasi, Aba, Abia State. In 1994 he earned his medical degree (MBBCh) from the University of Calabar. From 1994 to 1995 he enrolled for his Medical Internship at the University of Port Harcourt Teaching Hospital, After which he went for his National Youth Service Corps ( NYSC) program in 1995 to 1996.

Archibong later obtained a series of postgraduate qualifications:

- Master's of Public Health (MPH) – University of Liverpool
- MSc in Environmental Health Management – University of Uyo
- Master of Business Administration (MBA) – Nexford University, Washington D.C
- Executive Certificate – Harvard University

== Medical and professional career ==
From 1996 to 2002, Archibong worked as a Principal Medical Officer at Gbeye Clinic and Maternity in Omoku, Rivers State. He later served as Chief Medical Director of Cyrhaven Health Services and Investments Ltd from 2002 to 2015.

== Political career ==
He was a board Member of the Akwa Ibom Rural Water Supply and Sanitation Agency (AK-RUWATSAN) from 2013 to 2015.

In February 2025, Governor Umo Eno nominated Archibong as a commissioner, and the Akwa Ibom State House of Assembly confirmed him the same month.

Archibong was elected to the House of Representatives in 2015 as a member of the People's Democratic Party, representing the Itu/Ibiono Ibom federal constituency of Akwa Ibom State. He was then on seat until around 2023.
