= Essien Udim =

Essien Udim Ikot Obio-Okon
- LGA
- Interactive map of Essien Udim
- Location in Nigeria
- Coordinates: 5°08′0″N 7°41′0″E
- Country: Nigeria
- State: Akwa Ibom State
- Capital: Afaha Ikot Ebak

Government
  - Chairman: Usoro Ntiedo Effiong
  - House of Assembly Member: Prince Ukpong Akpabio

Area
  - Total: 298.1 km^{2} (115.1 sq mi)

Population (2022)
  - Total: 246,600
  - Density: 827.2/km^{2} (2,143/sq mi)
- Time zone: UTC+1 (WAT)

Essien UdimAudio is one of the Annang speaking Local Government Areas in Akwa Ibom State, Nigeria.

It was created out of the former Ikot Ekpene division and included the following clans in Annang land: Afaha Clan, Adiasim Clan, Odoro Ikot Clan, Ekpeyong Atai Clan, Ikpe Annang Clan, Okon Clan, Ukana Clan, and Ukana East Clan.

Essien Udim LGA has an expected populace of 79,444 occupants, with most of the area's general population being individuals from the Affang ethnic sub-division. The Affang language is broadly spoken nearby, while Christianity is the most prevalent religion in the LGA.

Milestones in Essien Udim LGA include the Sunshine Battery Industry for Ukana Ikot Ide and the Akan Ikot Okoro conversion. Federal Polytechnic, Ukana, and Topfaith University are located in Essien Udim.

It is the hometown of the former governor, minister, and present president of the Senate of the federal republic of Nigeria, Chief Dr. Godswill Obot Akpabio.

The current chairman of Essien Udim is Mr. Usoro Ntiedo Effiong.

== History ==
Historically, it was the most populated area among the Annang Land, with its headquarters in Afaha Ikot Ebak currently, and was created in the year 1989 from the Ikot Ekpene LGA.

In Ikpe Annang there are fourteen villages which are: Ibam, Ikot Akpan, Ikot Ntuen, Nnung Iyang, Udok, Mbia Obong, Mbiabet, Ikot Ekpe, Ikot Eside, Ebe, Ikot Abiat, Ekpeno Oton, Onion Ono, Ekoi, and the smallest village among them is Ikpe Ekoi and the largest is Mbiabet.

In Okon there are eighteen villages, which include: Ikot Idem Udo, Ikot Oko, Ikot Essien, Ikot Uke Etor, Ikot Nya, Ikot Ama, Ikot Igwe, Ikot Ekefre, Ikot Ekpenyong, Ikot Ocho, Ikot Udo Okure, Ikpe Okon, Ifa Okon, Umon, Nji, Ufuku, Nto Okpo, and Nto Ubiam.

== Geography ==
Essien Udim LGA observes two significant seasons: the dry and the blustery seasons, while the normal temperature of the area is 25 °C. The absolute yearly precipitation in Essien Udim LGA is 3550 mm, while the average humidity in the area is 86 percent. Essien Udim LGA consists of a few streams and feeders. The A342 highway crosses the east and the north of the LGA.

== Economy ==
Essien Udim Local Government Area has significant deposits of crude oil and natural gas, attracting several local and international petroleum companies to the region. Additionally, fishing is a prominent economic activity, supported by the area's numerous rivers and tributaries, which are rich in fish stocks.

Other significant financial endeavours in Essien Udim LGA include cultivating, exchange, making of blocks and pottery, making of raffia bins, caps and mats, and the creation of fishing nets and kayaks. Crops farmed in Essien Udim LGA include oil palm, cassava, and elastic while the business sectors in the space include the Obo Annang market.

== Political Wards ==
Wards	Ward Centers
Adiasim	Primary Sch., Ikot Ata Enin
Afaha 1	St Mary’s Cath. Sch., Urua Akpan
Afaha 2	Pri. Sch., Afaha Ikot Ebak
Okon	QIC Primary School, Ikot Oko
Ukana East 1	Unity Hall, Ukana Ikot Nkwa
Ukana East 2	Community Secondary Comm. School, Ikot Essien
Ukana West 1	St. Charles Primary School, Ukana Uwa West
Ukana West 2	Comp. Sec., Ikot Ide
Odoro Ikot 1	Sec. School, Odoro Ikot
Odoro Ikot 2	Govt. School, Ikot Okon/Ikot Idem
Ikpe Annang	General Hospital, Ikpe Anang
Ekpenyong 1	St. Anthony’s Cath. Sch., Ekpenyong Atai I
EKpenyong 2	St. Anthony’s Cath. Sch., Ekpenyong Atai II
