= Donald Duke =

Nigerian politician (born 1961)

Donald J. Duke

Commissioner for Finance and Planning
- In office 1992-1993
- Preceded by: Francis Afufu
- Succeeded by: Walter Patrick Eneji

Governor of Cross River State
- In office 29 May 1999 – 29 May 2007
- Preceded by: Christopher Osondu
- Succeeded by: Liyel Imoke

Personal details
- Born: 30 September 1961 (age 65) Calabar, Cross River State, Nigeria
- Party: Peoples Redemption Party (PRP)
- Spouse: Onari Duke
- Education: Ahmadu Bello University, Zaria Class of 1982 University of Pennsylvania Class of 1984
- Website: https://www.donaldduke.ng

Donald J. Duke (born 30 September 1961 in Calabar) is a Nigerian politician. He was the Governor of Cross River State, Nigeria from 29 May 1999 to 29 May 2007. He is currently a member of the People's Redemption Party (PRP) and was the 2019 Nigeria Presidential candidate for Social Democratic Party, SDP. He is currently the presidential candidate for the 2027 Nigeria general election under the People's Redemption Party.

== Background ==
Duke was born to Henry Etim Duke, the second indigenous (after Ayodele Diyan) and longest serving Comptroller-General of the Nigeria Customs Service (then referred to as Chairman of the Board of Customs and Excise Duties). His father was a member of the Duke chieftaincy family of Duke Town, one of Efik Kingdom's most powerful ruling dynasties.

== Education ==
He attended Corona School, Apapa, and Federal Government College, Sokoto.

He received his LLB degree in 1982 from Ahmadu Bello University, Zaria – Nigeria, his B.L. in 1983 from the Nigerian Law School, Lagos, and an L.L.M. in Business and Admiralty Law in 1984 from the University of Pennsylvania.

== Personal life ==
Duke is married to Onari Duke. In 2018, their daughter Xerona married the musician DJ Caise, a grandson of the billionaire Nigerian aristocrat Chief Antonio Deinde Fernandez.

== Political career ==
Spearheading the incumbent debt of Nigeria, Duke pushed for democracy and against military control. He stated: "What got the military out of power was not democracy but the dreadful state of the economy. If we, the democratic government, cannot deliver food for the mass of people we can forget about democracy."

Duke received praise for his contributions to the fields of agriculture, urban development, government, environment, information and communication, investment drive, and tourism, as well as having made Calabar the cleanest city in Nigeria.

He initiated the Obudu Ranch International Mountain Race which attracted contestants and visitors from other countries. In 2005, he created a special reserve fund for the state meant to "hedge against economic downturn, and the inevitable rainy day". This was meant to cushion the effect of unforeseeable economic challenges that may occasion uncertainty in the state's internally generated revenue, and monthly allocation from the federal government.

He also initiated the Calabar Carnival which started in 2004 and is popularly referred to as "Africa's biggest street party."

Duke initiated the Tinapa Resort project as a way to boost business and tourism in the state. Over $350 million was spent on initial development before phase 1 opening in April 2007.

BBC reported in September 2006 that Governor Duke was the only governor specifically mentioned as not being under investigation by the federal Economic and Financial Crimes Commission. (Four other governors were also reported as not under investigation but their names were not released.)

Duke announced that he would run for the presidency in the 2007 election, but stepped aside in favour of the eventual winner, Umaru Yar'Adua.

On 8 June 2018, Duke declared interest in running for presidency in 2019.

On Tuesday, 4 September 2018, Duke after much silence as to what party he'll be running under for president, announced that he'll be leaving PDP to run under SDP.

On Monday, 14 June 2021, Duke was officially welcomed back to PDP by the party's leaders after two years of defection to SDP in the presidential race. He stated some reasons why he left, saying that the party neglected and deviated from some of their core principles, and also urged the party to return to these principles.

== See also ==
- List of governors of Cross River State
