= Akwa Ibom South senatorial district =

Senatorial district in Nigeria

Akwa Ibom South senatorial district in Akwa Ibom State in Nigeria covers 12 local government areas. These areas include Ikot Abasi, Mkpat Enin, Eastern Obolo, Onna, Eket, Esit Eket, Ibeno, Okobo, Oron, UdungUko, Urueoffong/Oruko and Mbo. Akwa Ibom South senate district 871 polling units (Pus) and 127 registration areas (RAs).

The collation centre of this district is Eket LGA INEC office. Akon Eyakenyi of the PDP is the current representative of Akwa Ibom.

== List of senators representing Akwa Ibom South ==
Senator	Party	Year	Assembly
Sen. Udoma Udo Udoma	PDP	1999 - 2007	4th and 5th Assembly
Eme Ufot Ekaette	PDP	2007 - 2011	6th Assembly
Helen U. Esuene	PDP	2011 - 2015	7th Assembly
Sen. Nelson Effiong	PDP	2015 - 2019	8th Assembly
Akon Eyakenyi	PDP	2019 - 2023	9th Assembly
Ekong Sampson	PDP	2023 - 2027	10th Assembly
