= Chris Ekpenyong =

Nigerian politician (born 1954)

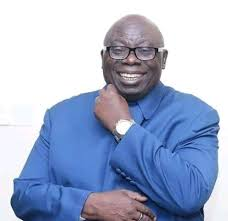

Senator for Akwa Ibom North-West
- In office 11 June 2019 – 11 June 2023
- Preceded by: Godswill Akpabio
- Succeeded by: Godswill Akpabio

Deputy Governor of Akwa Ibom State
- In office 1999–2005
- Governor: Victor Attah
- Succeeded by: Michael Udofia

Personal details
- Born: 29 September 1954 (age 71) Ikot Ukana, Obot-Akara, Southern Region, British Nigeria (now in Akwa Ibom State, Nigeria)
- Party: Peoples Democratic Party
- Spouse: Grace Ekpenyong (Deceased)

Christopher Stephen Obong Ekpenyong (born 29 September 1954) is a Nigerian politician and former Deputy governor of Akwa Ibom State. He was elected to the Nigerian Senate in 2019 to represent Akwa Ibom North-West senatorial district.

== Education ==
In 1960, he attended St. Patrick's Primary School, Ikot Ukana before leaving for St. Michael's Primary School, Rumuomasi, Port Harcourt where he got his First School Leaving Certificate (FSLC). In 1970, he attended Government Technical College, Port Harcourt and in 1975, he attended Federal Government Technical College, Yaba. In 1977, he attended Federal Polytechnic, Bida and obtained an Ordinary National Diploma in Electrical /Electronic Engineering. In 1980, Ekpenyong attended The Polytechnic Calabar for a Higher National Diploma in Electrical and Electronic Engineering and graduated in 1982.

In 1993, he attended Kensington University, Honolulu, Hawaii, United States and obtained a Master of Business Administration (Marketing) degree in 1995. He obtained his Doctor of Philosophy from the same institution.

== Political career ==
Ekpenyong was the deputy governor in Governor Victor Attah's tenure from 1999 until 2005.

In 2005, he made history in Nigeria: he was impeached as the deputy governor of Akwa Ibom state but was hurriedly returned to that position in less than seven days. The members of the state house of assembly reversed the impeachment after the intervention of then-President Olusegun Obasanjo, although Ekpenyong was forced to resign afterwards.

In 2019, he was elected as senator representing Akwa Ibom North West Senatorial District under the platform of Peoples Democratic Party beating his closest rival the incumbent, Godswill Akpabio of the All Progressive Congress. He received 118,215 votes as against 83,158 for Godswill Akpabio. He was declared the winner by the Independent National Electoral Commission (INEC) Electoral Officer Peter Ogban.

On 9 November 2019, the court of Appeal in Calabar, Cross Rivers State, ordered a re-run of the senatorial election in Essien Udim Local Government Area in Akwa Ibom State.

For the Akwa Ibom North-West Senatorial District election, the PDP candidate, Chris Ekpenyong, scored 134,717 votes to beat the former senator, Godswill Akpabio, who had 83,820 votes, according to the result released Sunday morning by INEC

== Personal life ==
On 19 August 2019, he lost his wife, Grace Ekpenyong.
