= Victor Attah =

Nigerian politician

Victor Bassey Attah

2nd Governor of Akwa Ibom State
- In office 29 May 1999 – 29 May 2007
- Deputy: Chris Ekpenyong (1999–2005); Michael Udofia (2005–2007)
- Preceded by: John Ebiye
- Succeeded by: Godswill Akpabio

Personal details
- Born: 20 November 1938 (age 87) Okop Ndua Erong, Asutan Ekpe, Ibesikpo Asutan LGA, Akwa Ibom State, Nigeria

Obong Victor Bassey Attah (born 20 November 1938) is a Nigerian politician who served as the Governor of Akwa Ibom State from 29 May 1999 to 29 May 2007. He was a member of the Board of Trustees of the Peoples Democratic Party (PDP).

== Background ==
Attah was born on 20 November 1938. He completed post-primary education in 1956. He gained a degree from Leeds College of Art and a postgraduate diploma in Building Science from Liverpool University in 1965. He won the scholarship to study at Columbia University in New York, where he obtained an MA in Advanced Architectural Design and Planning. He also attended the Kennedy Graduate School of Governance at Harvard University. After completing his education, he practised as an architect in the Caribbean, New York City, and Nigeria. He served as the national president of the Nigerian Institute of Architects.

== Governor of Akwa Ibom ==
He was part of the Peoples Democratic Movement led by Shehu Musa Yar'Adua in the aborted Sani Abacha transition program together with politicians such as Atiku Abubakar, Abdullahi Aliyu Sumaila, Magaji Abdullahi, Chuba Okadigbo and Sunday Afolabi. Attah was elected governor of Akwa Ibom in 1999 on the Akwa Ibom PDP platform, and was re-elected in 2003. He was elected Chairman of the Nigerian Governors' Forum in 2003.

In 2001, Attah travelled to the United States with as many as 21 people in search of foreign investors. This visit and others produced tangible results. He promised to improve telecoms, power supply, and air transport infrastructure, and to replicate Silicon Valley in Uyo. He planned to build an airport in Uyo before he left office in 2007. He laid the foundation for the establishment of the Akwa Ibom State University of Technology.

Attah ran for the presidential nomination of the Peoples Democratic Party in 2007, but later withdrew.

== Later career ==
Attah retired from politics after losing the PDP candidacy for presidency in 2007. He spent time with his wife, Alison, who is suffering from type 2 diabetes.

In March 2008, Attah joined ExecutiveAction, a consultancy that helps firms manage problems in difficult business environments.

== Honour ==
On 24 November 2018, in a public statement, Governor Udom Emmanuel of Akwa Ibom State, renamed Akwa Ibom International Airport to Victor Attah International Airport. The airport was named after the former governor to honour him as its founder during his tenure from 1999 to 2007.

== See also ==
- List of governors of Akwa Ibom State
