= List of governors of Cross River State =

Governor of Cross River State
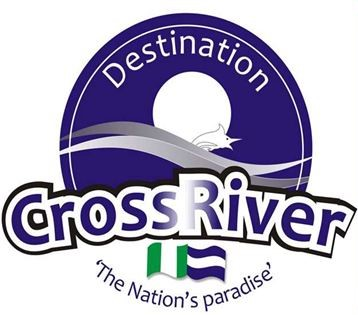
- Seal of Cross River State of Nigeria

- Flag of Cross River State of Nigeria

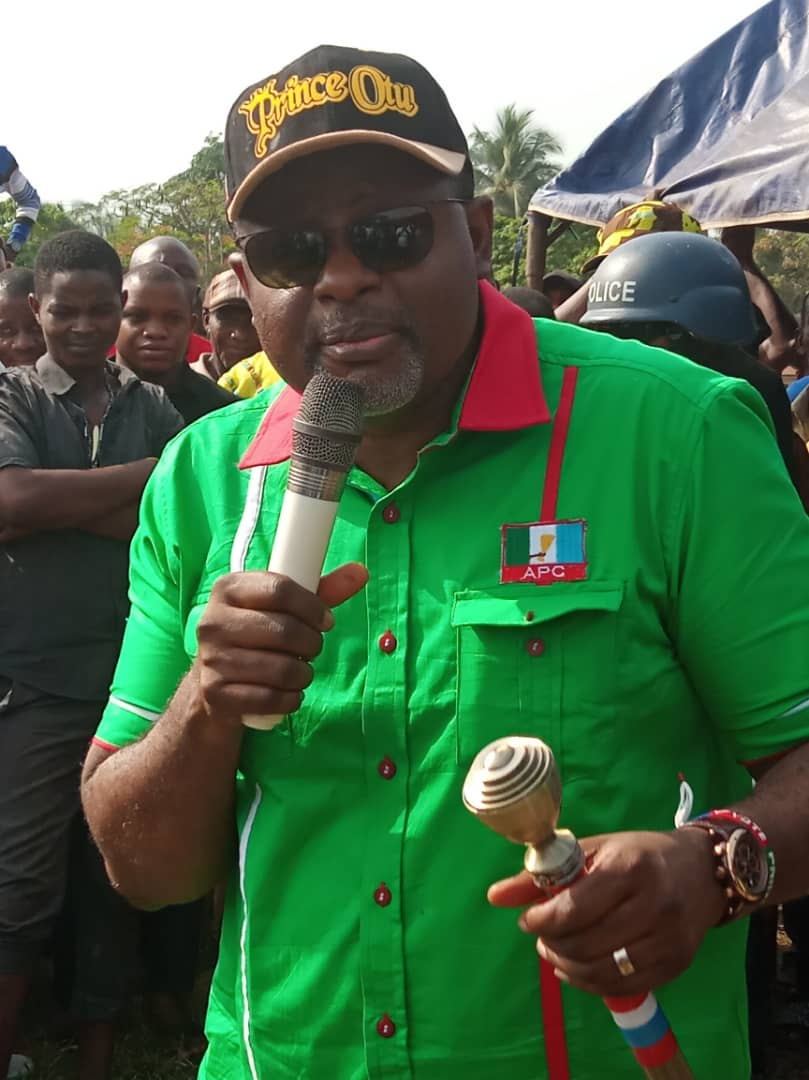
- Incumbent; Bassey Otu since May 2023

This is a list of administrators and governors of Cross River State, Nigeria, including leaders of South-Eastern State. South-Eastern State was formed on May 27, 1967 when Eastern Region was split into East-Central, Rivers and South-Eastern states. The state was renamed Cross River State in 1976.

South-Eastern State	Title	Took office	Left office	Party	Notes
Uduokaha Esuene	Governor	28 May 1967	July 1975	Military	
Paul Omu	Governor	3 February 1976	July 1978	Military	
Cross River State	Title	Took office	Left office	Party	Notes
Paul Omu	Governor	3 February 1976	July 1978	Military	
Babatunde Elegbede	Governor	July 1978	October 1979	Military	
Clement Isong	Governor	October 1979	October 1983	NPN	
Donald Etiebet	Governor	October 1983	December 1983	NPN	NAVY CAPTAIN EDET AKPAN ARCHIBONG; MILITARY GOVERNOR FROM JANUARY 1984 -MAY 1984
Dan Archibong	Governor	MAY 1984	1986	Military	
Eben Ibim Princewill	Governor	1986	December 1989	Military	
Ernest Attah	Governor	December 1989	January 1992	Military	
Clement Ebri	Governor	January 1992	November 1993	NRC	
Ibrahim Kefas	Administrator	9 December 1993	14 September 1994	Military	
Gregory Agboneni	Administrator	14 September 1994	22 August 1996	Military	
Umar Farouk Ahmed	Administrator	22 August 1996	August 1998	Military	
Christopher Osondu	Administrator	August 1998	May 1999	Military	
Donald Duke	Governor	29 May 1999	29 May 2007	PDP	
Liyel Imoke	Governor	29 May 2007	29 May 2015	PDP	
Benedict Ayade	Governor	29 May 2015	29 May 2023	APC	
Bassey Otu	Governor	29 May 2023	Incumbent	APC	

== See also ==
- States of Nigeria
- List of state governors of Nigeria
