= Godswill Akpabio =

President of the Senate of Nigeria since 2023

Godswill Akpabio GCON
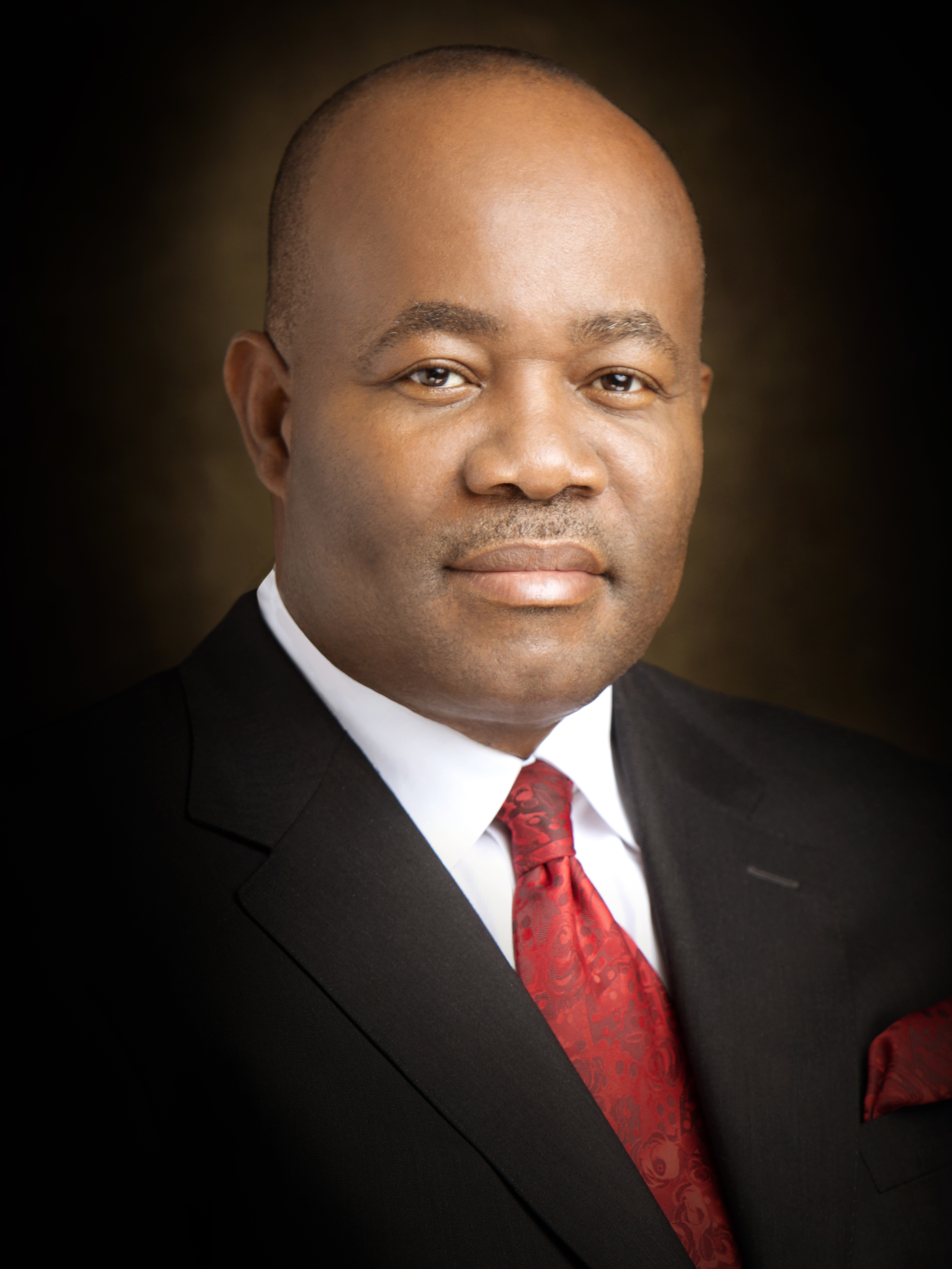
- Akpabio in 2012

15th President of the Nigerian Senate
- Incumbent
- Assumed office 13 June 2023
- Deputy: Barau Jibrin
- Preceded by: Ahmad Lawan

Senator for Akwa Ibom North-West
- Incumbent
- Assumed office 13 June 2023
- Preceded by: Chris Ekpenyong
- In office 9 June 2015 – 9 June 2019
- Preceded by: Aloysius Akpan Etok
- Succeeded by: Chris Ekpenyong

Minister for Niger Delta Affairs
- In office 21 August 2019 – 11 May 2022
- Preceded by: Usani Uguru Usani
- Succeeded by: Umana Okon Umana

Senate Minority Leader
- In office 28 July 2015 – 7 August 2018
- Preceded by: George Akume
- Succeeded by: Abiodun Olujimi

3rd Governor of Akwa Ibom State
- In office 29 May 2007 – 29 May 2015
- Preceded by: Obong Victor Attah
- Succeeded by: Udom Gabriel Emmanuel

Personal details
- Born: 9 December 1962 (age 63) Ukana, Ikot Ntuen, Essien Udim, Eastern Region, Nigeria (now in Akwa Ibom State)
- Party: All Progressives Congress (2018–present)
- Other political affiliations: Peoples Democratic Party (before 2018)
- Spouse: Ekaette Unoma Akpabio
- Education: University of Calabar
- Occupation: Politician; lawyer
- Website: https://godswillakpabio.com/

Chief Godswill Obot Akpabio GCON (Ibibio pronunciation; born 9 December 1962) is a Nigerian lawyer and politician who has been serving as the 15th president of the Nigerian Senate since 2023. He was first elected as Senator representing Akwa Ibom North-West Senatorial District in 2015, lost in the 2019 senatorial elections and won in the 2023 elections. He also served as minister for Niger Delta Affairs from 2019 up till 2022 when he resigned to seek re-election into the Nigerian senate. He had previously served as the Governor of Akwa Ibom State from 2007 to 2015.

== Early life and career ==
Godswill Akpabio is the son of Chief Obot Akpabio and Madam Lucy Obot Akpabio (née Inyangetor) of Ukana, Ikot Ntuen in Essien Udim Local Government Area. He was born on 9 December 1962. He lost his father at an early age and was raised by his mother.

=== Education ===
Akpabio was educated at Methodist Primary School, Ukana, Essien Udim LGA, Akwa Ibom State; the Federal Government College, Port Harcourt, Rivers State; and the University of Calabar, Cross River State, where he obtained a Degree in Law.

While at the Federal Government, College, Port Harcourt, he was appointed the Senior Prefect. In the University of Calabar, Akpabio was elected as the Student Union Government (SUG) Speaker of the 1987/88 parliamentary year.

=== Family and personal life ===
Akpabio's grandfather, Okuku Udo Akpabio, was the Warrant Chief in Ikot Ekpene province. His uncle, Dr. I. U. Akpabio, was the Minister of Education/Internal Affairs in the then Eastern Nigeria. Justice Nsima Akpabio, his cousin, was a senator in the Second Nigerian Republic.

Akpabio is a Christian of the Catholic faith. He is married to Ekaette Unoma Akpabio, the founder of the Family Life Enhancement Initiative (FLEI), a non-governmental organization aimed at redirecting development efforts towards families as a strategy for achieving the Millennium Development Goals (MDGs).

Akpabio and his wife have four daughters and one son.

=== Career and employment ===
Akpabio briefly worked as a teacher before joining Paul Usoro and Co., a prominent law firm in Nigeria as an associate partner.

He later worked with EMIS Telecoms Limited, a wireless telecommunications company based in Lagos, Nigeria. By 2002, he had become Managing Director and Chief Executive Officer. Prior to this, he served as the National Publicity Secretary of the Association of Telecommunication Companies in Nigeria, (ATCOM), while also serving as a director of EMIS.

=== Appointments and politics ===
In 2002, he was appointed Honourable Commissioner for Petroleum and Natural Resources by the then Governor Obong Victor Attah in Akwa Ibom State. Between 2002 and 2006, he served as a Commissioner in three key ministries: Petroleum and Natural Resources, Local Government and Chieftaincy Affairs, as well as Lands and Housing.

In 2006, he aspired for the governorship of Akwa Ibom State in a contested primary election and defeated 57 other aspirants to emerge the candidate of the Peoples Democratic Party (PDP). His campaign with the slogan, "let God's will be done" received mass support and was elected Governor in 2007. He was re-elected for a second term in office as Governor of Akwa Ibom State in 2011.

In 2013, he was elected chairman of the newly formed PDP Governors Forum.

In 2015, he contested and won the Senate seat of the Akwa Ibom North-West Senatorial District (Ikot Ekpene) to represent the district in the Senate of the Federal Republic of Nigeria. Running under the platform of the People's Democratic Party (PDP), he polled 422,009 of the 439,449 to defeat Chief Inibehe Okorie of the All Progressives Congress (APC) who recorded 15,152 votes to be declared elected by the Independent National Electoral Commission (INEC).

Akpabio was nominated for the position of the Senate Minority Leader by the South-South caucus of the Peoples Democratic Party (PDP), ratified by the caucus of the PDP in the Senate and announced by the Senate President as Senate Minority Leader on 28 July 2015. The PDP lost the majority to the All Progressives Congress (APC), in the 2015 general elections.

In August 2018, he resigned as the Senate Minority Leader, after he had announced his defection to the All Progressives Congress. His defection was marked by a Political rally in his hometown at the Ikot Ekpene township stadium, Akwa Ibom State.

In July 2019, he was nominated by President Muhammadu Buhari and screened by the Nigerian Senate for a Ministerial appointment.

On 21 August 2019, he was sworn in as Minister for Niger Delta Affairs.

In June 2022, Akpabio resigned from his position as minister for Niger Delta Affairs to contest in the presidential primaries of the ruling All Progressives Congress (APC) but stepped down on the night of the primaries for the eventual winner Bola Tinubu. A few days after the presidential primaries, he emerged as the Senatorial candidate for Akwa Ibom North-West Senatorial District. However, it was fraught with accusations of foul play by stakeholders of the party in the State. He went on to defeat his closest rival Emmanuel Enoidem of the Peoples Democratic Party to become the senator-elect in the 2023 general elections polling 115,401 votes, against Enoidem's 69,838 votes.

On 13 June 2023, he was elected President of the Senate of Nigeria with 63 votes defeating Senator Abdulaziz Yari, a former Governor of Zamfara State who scored 46 votes.

== Corruption accusations ==
Godswill Akpabio was under investigation by the Economic and Financial Crimes Commission (EFCC) on accusations that he diverted over 100 billion Naira from Akwa Ibom State during his time as governor (2007-2015) with American diplomats calling the level of corruption "exceptional" during his tenure. However, no charges have been filed. A lawyer, Leo Ekpenyong who also accused Akpabio of corruption, was later arraigned by the police in court for defamation.

In May 2020, Akpabio was summoned by members of the House of Representatives over the misappropriation of 40 billion Naira.

== Honours ==
=== International honours ===
- The Congressional Certificate of Recognition of the United States Congress (2011).
- Africa Lifetime Achievement Prize awarded by Millennium Excellence Foundation in Kenya.
- The Gold Humanitarian Services Award of the Republic of Niger 2008 conferred on him by Niger's Ambassador to Nigeria, His Excellency, Alhaji Moussa Ibrahim.
- Exam Ethic Marshall 2009: Exam Ethic International, Ghana.
- Best Governor, Infrastructure Development 2009: BEN Television, London.
- Honorary citizen of the city of Georgia, New Jersey in United States

=== National honours ===
- Commander of the Order of the Niger (CON).
- Best Governor Infrastructure and Empowerment Award of the Central Bank of Nigeria (2012).
- Most Prolific Governor by the National Councillors' Forum.

=== Academic & professional honours ===
- Doctorate of Management Science, Honoris Causa, Nigeria Defence Academy (2011).
- Doctorate of Law, Honoris Causa, University of Nigeria, Nsukka (2010).
- Doctorate of Law, Honoris Causa, University of Calabar, Calabar (2009).
- Doctorate of Law, Honoris Causa, University of Uyo, Uyo (2009).
- Doctorate of Public Administration (Honoris Causa), Nnamdi Azikiwe University, Awka (2009).
- Doctorate of Management Science (Honoris Causa) Federal University of Technology, Owerri (2011).
- Doctorate of Public Administration, Honoris Causa Enugu State University of Science and Technology (ESUT), Enugu (2013).
- Doctorate of Human Resource Management (Honoris Causa) Wesley University of Science and Technology, Ondo.
- Honorary Doctorate Degrees, University of Calabar (2025)
- Honorary Fellow of Nigeria Society of Engineers (2010) (Only fourteen non-engineers have so far been so honoured in Nigeria).
- Fellow, Kazaure Polytechnic, Kazaure (2008).
- Fellow of the Yaba College of Technology, Yaba (2011).
- Fellow of the College of Education, Bichi, and a host of others.
- Most Education Friendly Governor in Nigeria (2008) by the National Parent-Teacher Association.
- Best Booster Governor Award for Promoting Science, Technology and Mathematics by the Science Teachers Association of Nigeria.
- University of Calabar renamed its International Conference Centre to Senate President Godswill Akpabio (2025).
- Goodwill Ambassador of the Nigerian Medical Association.
- Inducted into the University of Calabar Hall of Fame (2025).

=== Media honours ===
- Best Governor in Africa, Africa Development Magazine.
- Governor of the Year 2012, Leadership.
- Man of the Year 2011, The Sun.
- Best Governor in Nigeria and Outstanding Human Brand 2010: Billboard World.
- Man of the Year 2010: National Daily Newspaper.
- Governor of the Year 2010: Nigerian Tribune.
- Award of Excellence for Outstanding Performance 2010: Nigeria Union of Journalists.
- Nigeria's Emerging Tiger 2009: This Day.
- Man of the Year 2009: Daily Independent.
- Man of the Year 2009: National Daily Newspaper.
- 2008 Most Outstanding Governor in Nigeria (South-South): National Daily Newspaper.
- Governor of the Year (South-South): City People Magazine.
- Best Governor Infrastructure 2009: Encomium Magazine.
- Best Governor (South-South): Encomium Magazine.
- Excellency Award as Best Governor South-South 2009: Global Excellence Magazine.

== See also ==
- Akwa Ibom State People's Democratic Party
- List of governors of Akwa Ibom State

=== External links ===
- Godswillakpabio.com
