= List of English words of Niger-Congo origin =

This is a list of English language words that come from the Niger-Congo languages. It excludes placenames except where they have become common words.

== Bantu origin ==
- banjo – probably Bantu mbanza
- basenji – breed of dog from the Congo
- boma – probably from Swahili
- bwana – from Swahili, meaning an important person or safari leader
- chimpanzee – loaned in the 18th century from a Bantu language, possibly Kivili ci-mpenzi.
- dengue – possibly from Swahili dinga
- goober – possibly from Bantu (Kikongo and Kimbundu nguba)
- gilo - from Kimbundu njilu, via Portuguese jiló
- gumbo – from Bantu (Kimbundu ingombo, plural of kingombo, meaning "okra")
- impala – from Zulu im-pala
- impi – from Zulu language meaning war, battle or a regiment
- indaba – from Xhosa or Zulu languages – 'stories' or 'news' typically conflated with 'meeting' (often used in South African English)
- isango – Zulu meaning gateway
- jumbo – from Swahili (jambo or jumbe or from Kongo nzamba "elephant")
- kalimba
- Kwanzaa – recent coinage (Maulana Karenga 1965) as the name of a "specifically African-American holiday", abstracted from a Swahili phrase matunda ya kwanza, meaning "first fruits [of the harvest]".
- lapa – from Sotho languages – enclosure or barbecue area (often used in South African English)
- macaque – from Bantu makaku through Portuguese and French
- mamba – from Zulu or Swahili mamba
- marimba – from Bantu (Kimbundu and Swahili marimba, malimba)
- okapi – from a language in the Congo
- safari – from Swahili travel, ultimately from Arabic
- sangoma – from Zulu – traditional healer (often used in South African English)
- tilapia – Possibly a latinization "thiape", the Tswana word for fish.
- tsetse – from a Bantu language (Tswana tsetse, Luhya tsiisi)
- ubuntu – Nguni term for "mankind; humanity", in South Africa since the 1980s also used capitalized, Ubuntu, as the name of a philosophy or ideology of "human kindness" or "humanism".
- vuvuzela – musical instrument, name of Zulu or Nguni origin
- zebra – of unknown origin, recorded since c. 1600, possibly from a Congolese language, or alternatively from Amharic.
- zombie – likely from West African (compare Kikongo zumbi "fetish", Kimbundu nzambi "god")

== Non-Bantu West African origin ==
- azawakh - probably from Fula or Tuareg. A breed of dogs from West and North Africa
- banana – West African, possibly Wolof banana
- bongo – West African boungu
- buckra – "white man or person", from Efik and Ibibio mbakara
- chigger – possibly from Wolof and/or Yoruba jiga "insect"
- cola – from West African languages (Temne kola, Mandinka kolo)
- djembe – from West African languages
- jazz – from West African languages (Mandinka jasi, Temne yas)
- jive – possibly from Wolof jev
- juke, jukebox – possibly from Wolof and Bambara dzug through Gullah
- kwashiorkor – from Ga language, Coastal Ghana meaning "swollen stomach"
- Marímbula, plucked musical instrument (lamellophone) of the Caribbean islands
- merengue (dance) possibly from Fulani mererek i meaning to shake or quiver
- mumbo jumbo – from Mandingo name Maamajombo, a masked dancer
- mojo – from Kongo “moyo” meaning “spirit”
- obeah – from West African (Efik ubio, Twi ebayifo)
- okra – from Igbo ókùrù
- sambo – Fula sambo meaning "uncle"
- tango – probably from Ibibio tamgu
- tote – West African via Gullah
- vodou – from West African languages (Ewe and Fon vodu "spirit")
- yam – West African (Fula nyami, Twi anyinam)
