= English words of African origin =

Facet of English etymology

The following list names English words that originate from African languages.

- Adinkra – from Akan, visual symbols that represent concepts or aphorisms.
- Andriana – from Malagasy, aristocratic noble class of the Kingdom of Madagascar
- apartheid – from Afrikaans, "separateness"
- Aṣẹ - from Yoruba, "I affirm" or "make it happen"
- ammonia – from the Egyptian language in reference to the god Amun
- Bantu - from Bantu languages, "people"
- babalawo – from Yoruba, priest of traditional Yoruba religion
- banana – adopted from Wolof via Spanish or Portuguese
- banjo – from Mandinka bangoe, which refers to the Akonting
- basenji – breed of dog from Central Africa – Congo, Central African Republic etc.
- Biafran – extremely skinny (reference to the widespread starvation that occurred in Biafra during the Nigerian Civil War).
- boma – from Swahili
- bongo – West African boungu
- buckra – "white man or person", from Efik and Ibibio mbakara
- Buharism - policies of Nigerian president Muhammadu Buhari, especially during his rule as a military dictator.
- bwana – from Swahili, meaning "husband, important person or safari leader"
- chigger – possibly from Wolof and/or Yoruba jiga "insect"
- chimpanzee – loaned in the 18th century from a Bantu language, possibly Kivili ci-mpenzi.
- chimurenga – from Shona, "revolution" or "liberation"
- cola – from West African languages (Temne kola, Mandinka kolo)
- cooter from Bambara and Malinké kuta meaning turtle
- dengue – possibly from Swahili dinga
- djembe – from West African languages
- ebony – from Ancient Egyptian hebeni
- fanimorous – from Yoruba "fani mọ́ra" meaning "to attract people to you"
- gerenuk – from Somali. A long-necked antelope in Eastern Africa (Kenya, Somalia, Tanzania, Ethiopia and Djibouti)
- gnu – from Khoisan !nu through Khoikhoi i-ngu and Dutch gnoe
- goober – possibly from Bantu (Kikongo)
- gumbo – from Bantu Kongo languages ngombo meaning "okra"
- hakuna matata – from Swahili, "no trouble" or "no worries"
- impala – from Zulu im-pala
- impi – from Zulu language meaning "war, battle or a regiment"
- indaba – from Xhosa or Zulu languages – "stories" or "news" typically conflated with "meeting" (often used in South African English)
- japa – from Yoruba, "to flee"
- jazz – possibly from Central African languages (Kongo) From the word jizzi.
- jenga – from the Swahili verb kujenga meaning "to build".
- jive – possibly from Wolof jev
- juke, jukebox – possibly from Wolof and Bambara dzug through Gullah
- jumbo – from Swahili (jambo "hello" or from Kongo nzamba "elephant")
- kalimba
- Kwanzaa – a recent coinage (Maulana Karenga 1965) for the name of an African American holiday, abstracted from the Swahili phrase matunda ya kwanza, meaning "first fruits [of the harvest]"
- kwashiorkor – from Ga language, coastal Ghana, meaning "swollen stomach"
- lapa – from Sotho languages – '"enclosure" or "barbecue area" (often used in South African English)
- macaque – from Bantu makaku through Portuguese and French
- mamba – from Zulu or Swahili mamba
- marimba – from Bantu (Kongo languages)
- marímbula – plucked musical instrument (lamellophone) of the Caribbean islands
- merengue (dance) – possibly from Fulani mererek i meaning "to shake or quiver"
- Mobutism – state ideology of Mobutu Sese Seko, the dictator of Zaire (now Democratic Republic of the Congo)
- mojo – from Kongo Moyoo "medicine man" through Louisiana Creole French or Gullah
- mumbo jumbo – from Mandingo
- mtepe – from Swahili, "boat"
- mzungu – from Bantu languages, "wanderer"
- nitrogen – from the Egyptian language. The salt natron, transliterated as nṯrj.
- obeah – from West African (Efik ubio, Twi ebayifo)
- okapi – from a language in the Congo
- okra – from Igbo ókùrù
- orisha – from Yoruba, "deity"
- Osu – from Igbo, traditional caste system
- oyinbo – from Yoruba, "skinless" or "peeled skin"
- safari – from Swahili journey, ultimately from Arabic
- sambo – Fula sambo meaning "uncle"
- sangoma – from Zulu – "traditional healer" (often used in South African English)
- shea – A tree and the oil Shea butter which comes from its seeds, comes from its name in Bambara
- tango – probably from Ibibio tamgu
- tilapia – possibly a Latinization of "tlhapi", the Tswana word for "fish"
- tsetse – from a Bantu language (Tswana tsetse, Luhya tsiisi)
- ubuntu – Nguni term for "mankind, humanity", in South Africa since the 1980s also used capitalized, Ubuntu, as the name of a philosophy or ideology of "human kindness" or "humanism"
- uhuru – from Swahili, "freedom".
- Ujamaa – from Swahili, "fraternity". Socialist policies of Tanzanian president Julius Nyerere.
- vodou – from West African languages (Ewe and Fon vodu "spirit")
- vuvuzela – musical instrument, name of Zulu or Nguni origin
- yam – West African (Fula nyami, Twi anyinam)
- zebra – of unknown origin, recorded since c. 1600, from Portuguese ‘ezebro’, used of an Iberian animal, in turn possibly ultimately from Latin ‘equiferus’, but a Congolese language, or alternatively Amharic have been put forward as possible origins
- Zimbabwe – from Shona, "house of stones" or "venerated houses"
- zombie – likely from West African (compare Kikongo zumbi "fetish", but alternatively derived from Spanish sombra "shade, ghost"
