= Holy water (disambiguation) =

Holy water is water that has been blessed in a religious ceremony. See also:

- Holy water in Christianity

Holy water may also refer to:

== Music ==
=== Albums ===
- Holy Water (Bad Company album), 1990
- Holy Water (Wendy Oldfield album), 2002
- Holy Water (Villebillies album), 2016
- Holy Water (We the Kingdom album), 2020

=== Songs ===
- "Holy Water" (Big & Rich song), 2004
- "Holy Water" (Galantis song), 2019
- "Holy Water" (Madonna song), 2015
- "Holy Water" (Marshmello and Jelly Roll song), 2025
- "Holy Water" (The Funeral Portrait song), 2025
- "Holy Water" (The Triffids song), 1988
- "Holy Water" (We the Kingdom song), 2019
- "Holy Water", a song by Hembree
- "Holy Water", a song by Pier Gonella from 667
- "Holy Water", a song by Soundgarden from Badmotorfinger
- "Holy Water", a song by the Tom Tom Club from The Good, the Bad, and the Funky
- "Holy Water", a song by WhoCares, from the release "Out of My Mind / Holy Water"
- "Holy Water", a song by Taemin from Taemin
- "Holy Water", a cover of a Villebillies song in Paranormal (Alice Cooper album), 2017
- "Holy Water", a song by Iceage from For Love of Grace & the Hereafter

== Other uses ==
- Holy Water (film), 2009

== See also ==
- Sacred water (disambiguation)
