= Sacred water =

Sacred water may refer to:

== Religion ==
- Holy water, ritually sanctified water
- Sacred waters, water from a sacred source

== Arts and entertainment ==
- Sacred Water, a 1993 book by Leslie Marmon Silko
- Sacred Water, a 2016 Rwandan film
- Sacred Waters (1932 film), a German film
- Sacred Waters (1960 film), a Swiss film

== See also ==
- Holy water (disambiguation)
