= Bwana =

Bwana may refer to:

- List of English words of Niger-Congo origin
- Bwana (film), a 1996 Spanish drama film
