= Africanisms =

Characteristics of African culture in the Americas

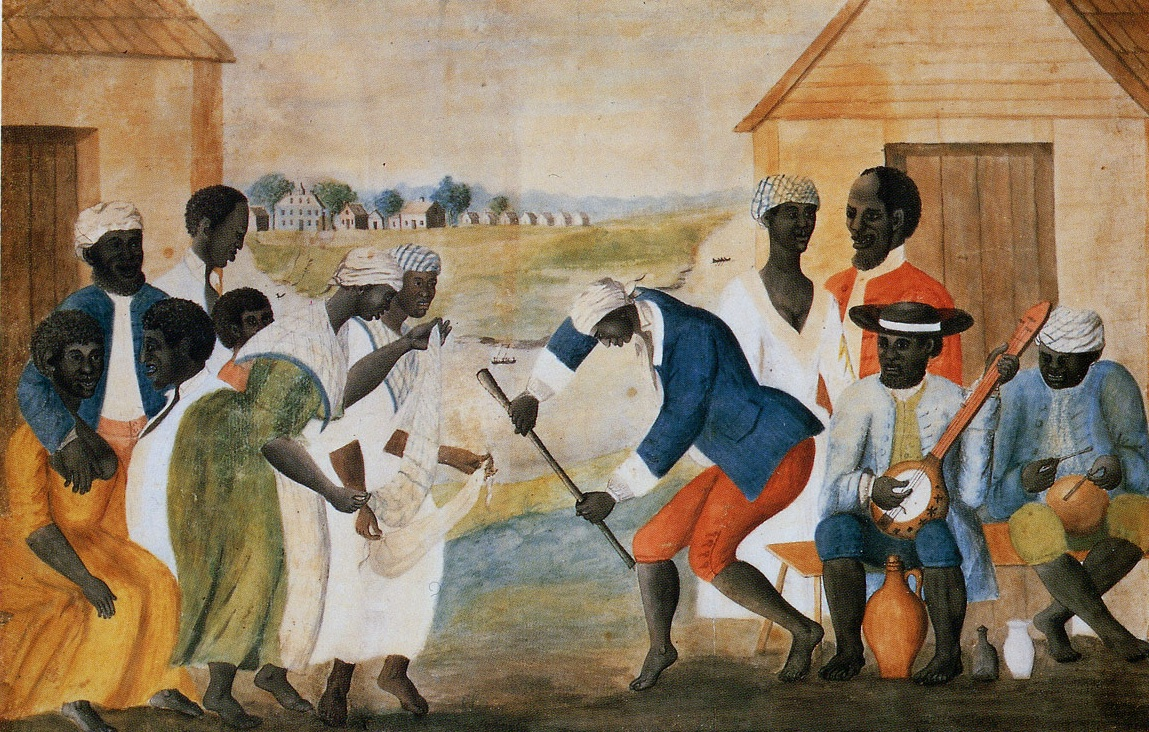
The 18th-century painting The Old Plantation depicts several examples of Africanisms brought to the Carolinas, including musical instruments, headdresses, and dance steps.

Africanisms refers to characteristics of African culture that can be traced through societal practices and institutions of the African diaspora. Throughout history, the dispersed descendants of Africans have retained many forms of their ancestral African culture. Also, common throughout history is the misunderstanding of these remittances and their meanings. The term usually refers to the cultural and linguistic practices of West and Central Africans who were transported to the Americas during the trans-Atlantic slave trade. Africanisms have influenced the cultures of diverse countries in North and South America and the Caribbean through language, music, dance, food, animal husbandry, medicine, and folklore.

== Language ==
=== American English ===
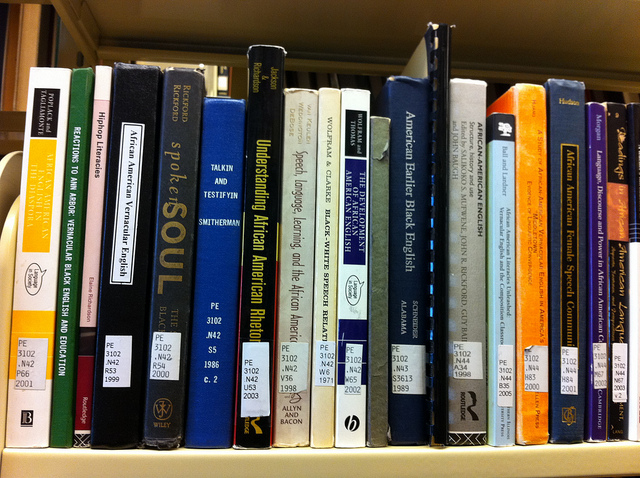
Books about African American English

Africanisms are incorporated in American English. Although physical artifacts could not be kept by slaves because of their enslaved status, "Subtler linguistic and communicative artefacts were sustained and embellished by the Africans’ creativity."

The language spoken by African Americans is greatly influenced by the phonological and syntactic structures of African languages. African American languages were not initially studied, because scholars thought Africans had no culture. "Recent linguistic studies define a language variously referred to as Black English, African American English, or, more appropriately, Ebonics." Some West African languages do not explicitly distinguish past and present. Instead, context allows statements to be interpreted as past or present. The early language associated with cowboy culture was influenced by African phonology. African words that became part of the American language include banana, jazz, boogie and zombie.

African-Americans in the United States continued some African naming traditions throughout slavery and beyond, including naming themselves for seasons or days of the week, and using more than one name in a lifetime.

African and African-American linguistic structures, as well as the traditions of rhythmic speech, call-and-response and verbal battles, developed into rap and hip-hop, which has had a global influence.

The Gullah dialect of English spoken in the Sea Islands off the coast of Georgia and the Carolinas has retained many African features.

=== Spanish and Brazilian Portuguese ===
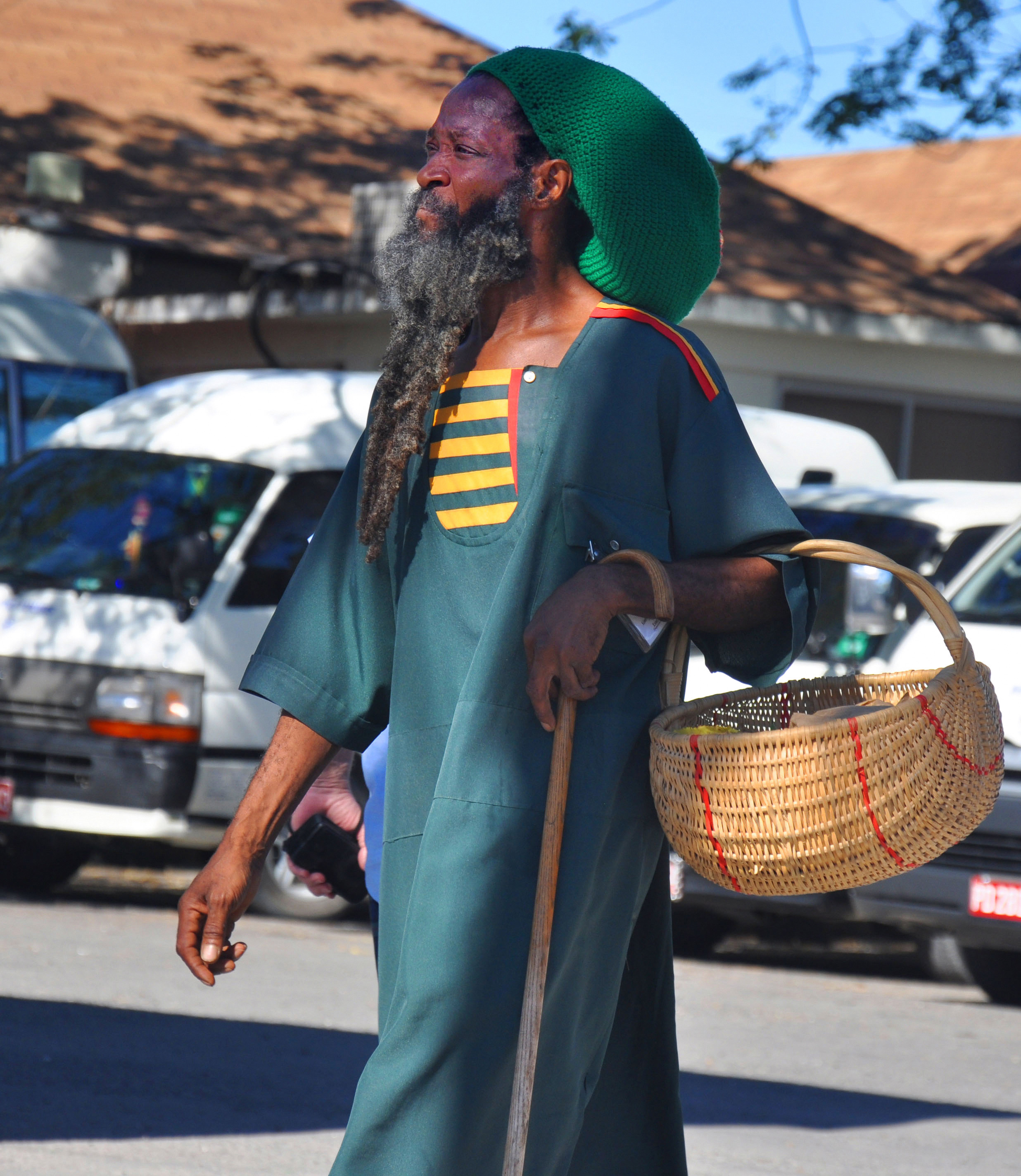
Jamaican man

Latin American countries have incorporated Africanisms into Spanish and Brazilian Portuguese. Latin American Spanish words with African roots include merengue, (music/dance as well as 'mess' or 'wimp') cachimbo (pipe, soldier), and chevere (fantastic, great). The African languages have also influenced the phonology of Puerto Rican Spanish with the deletion of final consonants like /s/ and /n/, and the alternation of the /l/ and /r/ consonants. In Brazil, words like 'bunda' (butt) and 'cochilar' (napping) come from the Kimbundu language of West Africa.

=== Haitian Creole ===
Scholars have noted that the Haitian Creole that developed in Saint Domingue contained a mixture of Africanisms and local expressions, "a thousand little nothings that one wouldn't dare to say in French." Although much of its vocabulary is from 18th Century French, the grammar of Haitian Creole comes from the West African Volta-Congo language branch, particularly the Fongbe language and Igbo language.

=== Jamaican Patois ===
English is the official language of Jamaica. But the grammatical structure, vocabulary, sound and syntax of Jamaican Patois has roots in African languages (Gladwell 1994). The use of only one verb tense in Jamaican Creole shows its relationship to root languages of the Niger-Congo region, where they also use verbs with no past or future tense.

== Music ==
=== Secular music ===
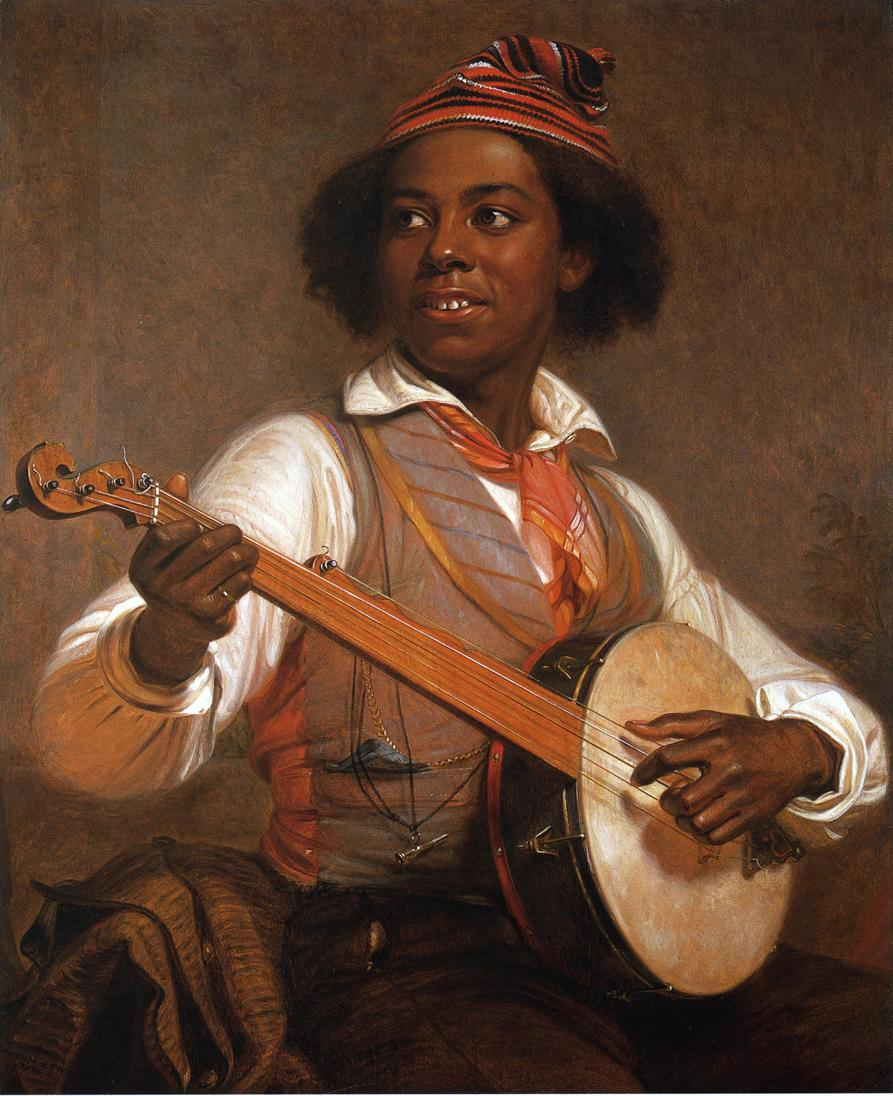
William Sidney Mount, The Banjo Player, 1856

African influenced music traditions in the United States set the foundation for much of what became known as American music. The blues is a music genre created by Africans in America. The music featured polyrhythms, call and response figures, loose blues forms, a blues scale, and vocalizations that are different from western music. This innovation led to all African-American secular music that followed, which includes blues, jazz, rhythm and blues, rock & roll, soul music, fusion, disco, funk, hip hop and others. The underlying elements of these genres can all be traced back to the musical elements derived from West Africa during the formation of the blues genre.

The musical instrument the banjo was created by African American slaves, copied by memory from African instruments with similar names, like the 'bania' and 'banjo'. The slaves taught European-Americans how to play the instrument, and it became a mainstay of several genres of American music, including bluegrass and folk music. Other musical instruments of African origin, from the Bantu culture of Angola, include drums, diddley bows, mouthbows, the washtub bass, jugs, gongs, bells, rattles, ideophones, and the lokoimni, a five-stringed harp.

African and European musical traditions came together in New Orleans, Missouri and Mississippi to create the foundation for jazz. In New Orleans, a city filled with people of French, Latin American, West Indian and African heritage, lighter-skinned Black Creoles sometimes trained as classical musicians, where they learned western music theory. Paid musicians in New Orleans in the late 19th century were generally of this Black Creole class. The African tradition of music as a public and collaborative event rather than a private performance helped create gatherings of musicians in New Orleans' Congo square, where they combined French, Latin and African musical traditions to form early jazz. Ragtime, a late 19th century precursor to jazz, blended elements from minstrel-show songs, African American banjo styles, and the cakewalk with European music.

In Latin America, African influence could be heard as early as the 17th century in songs called Negritos, whose lyrics mixed Spanish and African languages and whose call and response patterns and rhythmic groupings came from Africa. Other African-influenced Latin music includes bachata, batucada, cha-cha-cha, conga, funk carioca, mambo, tango, pachanga, reggaeton, rumba, samba, son, salsa, tropicalia, and zouk. In Argentina and Uruguay, African rhythms and practices influenced the development of candombe drumming and tango.

=== Sacred music ===
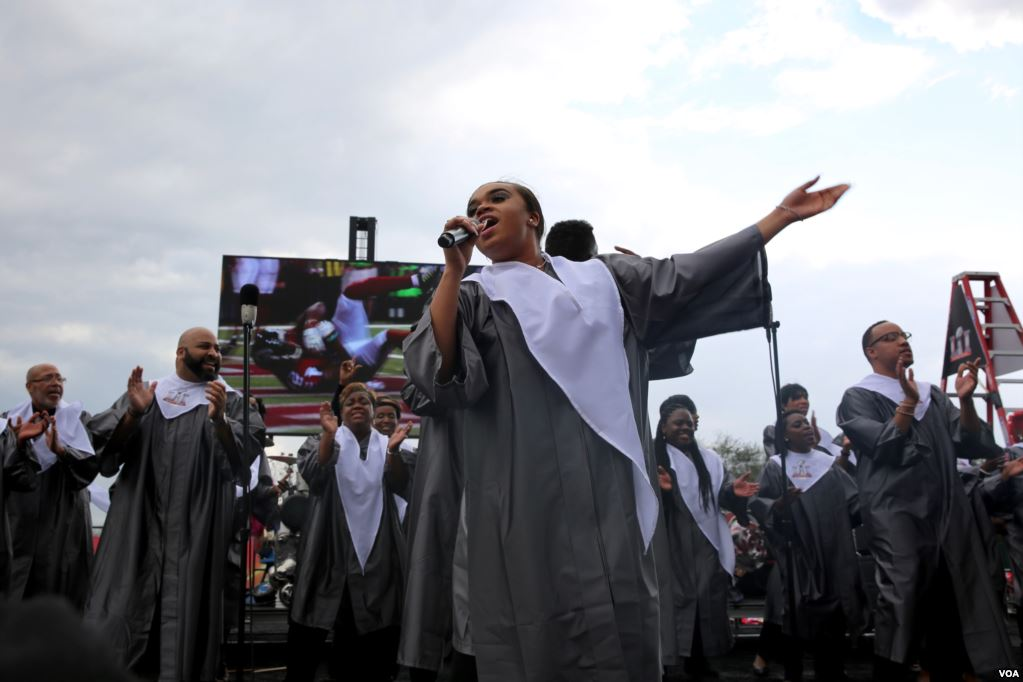
Gospel singers at the Super Bowl LI pregame in the United States

Sacred music is music with religious themes. This music remains prevalent and relevant through Christian gospel music and church hymns. During slavery in the United States, the enslaved people sang "negro spirituals" such as "Go Down Moses" as a way to ease their pain and also as a way to send coded signals to each other in resistance to slavery. The songs were sung at work in the fields as well as while worshipping. Negro spirituals during slavery brought together a community. Praising the Lord through song offered an alternative vision of empowerment and liberation to the Christianity that was imposed on them by slave masters. Gospel music emerged from the tradition of black spirituals in the early 20th century. African traditions in Black gospel singing can be heard in the call and response patterns, vocal styles and polyrhythmic clapped accompaniments. This music remains the foundation of the African American experience. Additionally, it influenced other races and cultures. "... African Americans recognized the richness of these religious folk songs and were quick to bring them to European art music practices such as those found in unaccompanied choral motets and vocal art songs."

== Food ==
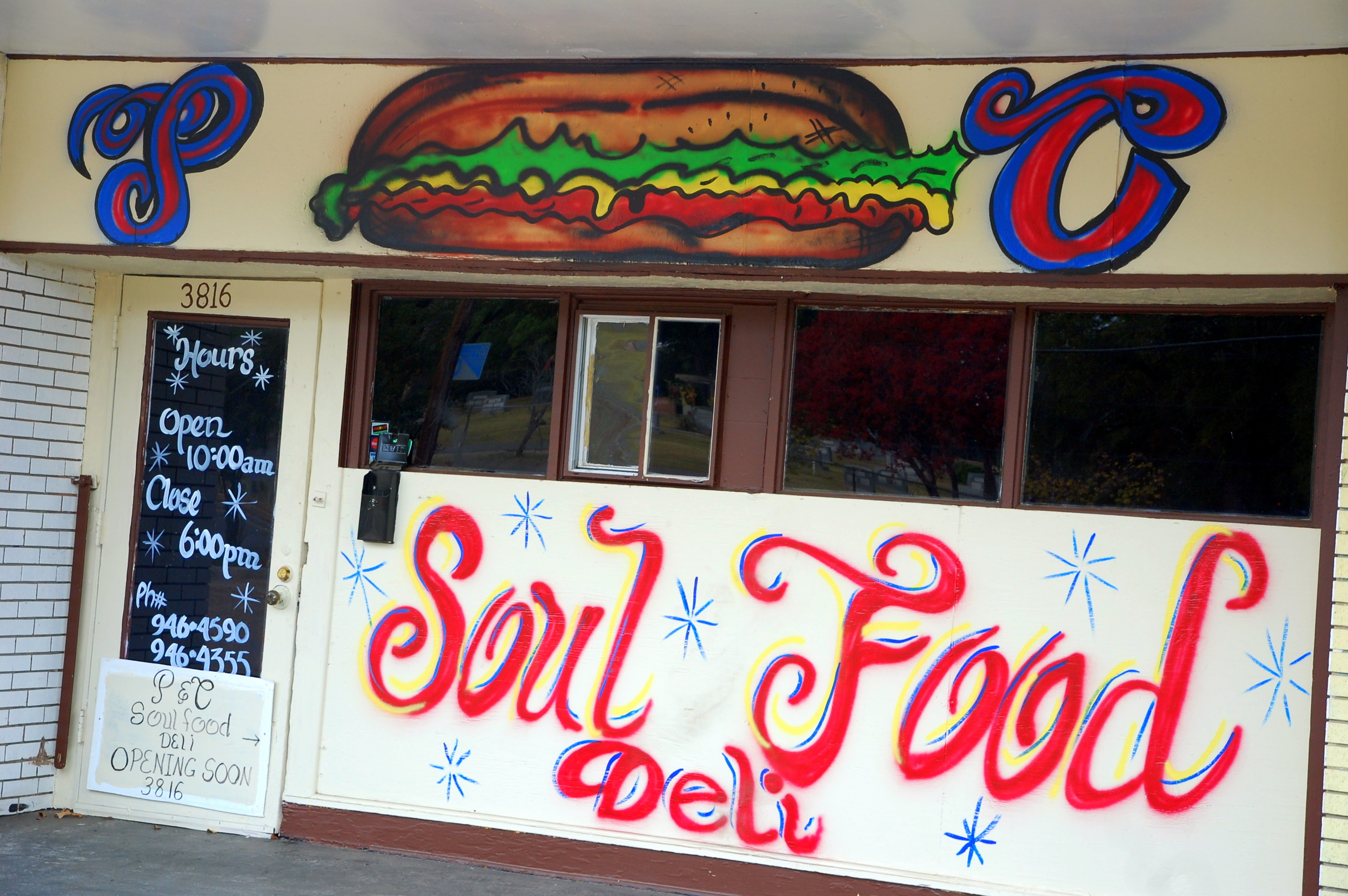
Soul Food Deli, Shreveport

Another influential aspect of African culture is food, which had a global impact even before the Transatlantic Slave Trade. Since then, African traditions have had a particular impact on African-American, Southern American, Latin American, and Caribbean cuisine.

African cuisine was born in East Africa, the cradle of human civilization. From there, recipes, spices and culinary techniques spread through migration and trade to Asia, Europe and indigenous cultures of the Americas.

During the Transatlantic slave trade many foods accompanied enslaved people to the Southern United States including okra, black-eyed peas and African rice. Okra is a green vegetable which may originally have been domesticated in Ethiopia or Egypt. It appears in a variety of soups, stews and rice dishes. Enslaved Africans passed their recipes on to their descendants, as well as to Southern whites. These dishes became known as soul food with origins in former slave states. Many of these recipes continue to be popular and became one of the most well-known aspects of African- American and Southern American culture.

The Louisiana dish 'gumbo' comes from the West African word for "okra", nkombo. Jambalaya and gumbo are similar to West African dishes such as dchebuchin, which originated in the Senegambian region.

African culinary traditions have had a substantial influence on Caribbean and Latin American cuisine, as can be seen and tasted in dishes such as mondongo (chitlins), fufu, giambo, sancocho, picodillo tembleque, bean soups, chinchulines (another form of chitlins), and other dishes.

== Dance ==
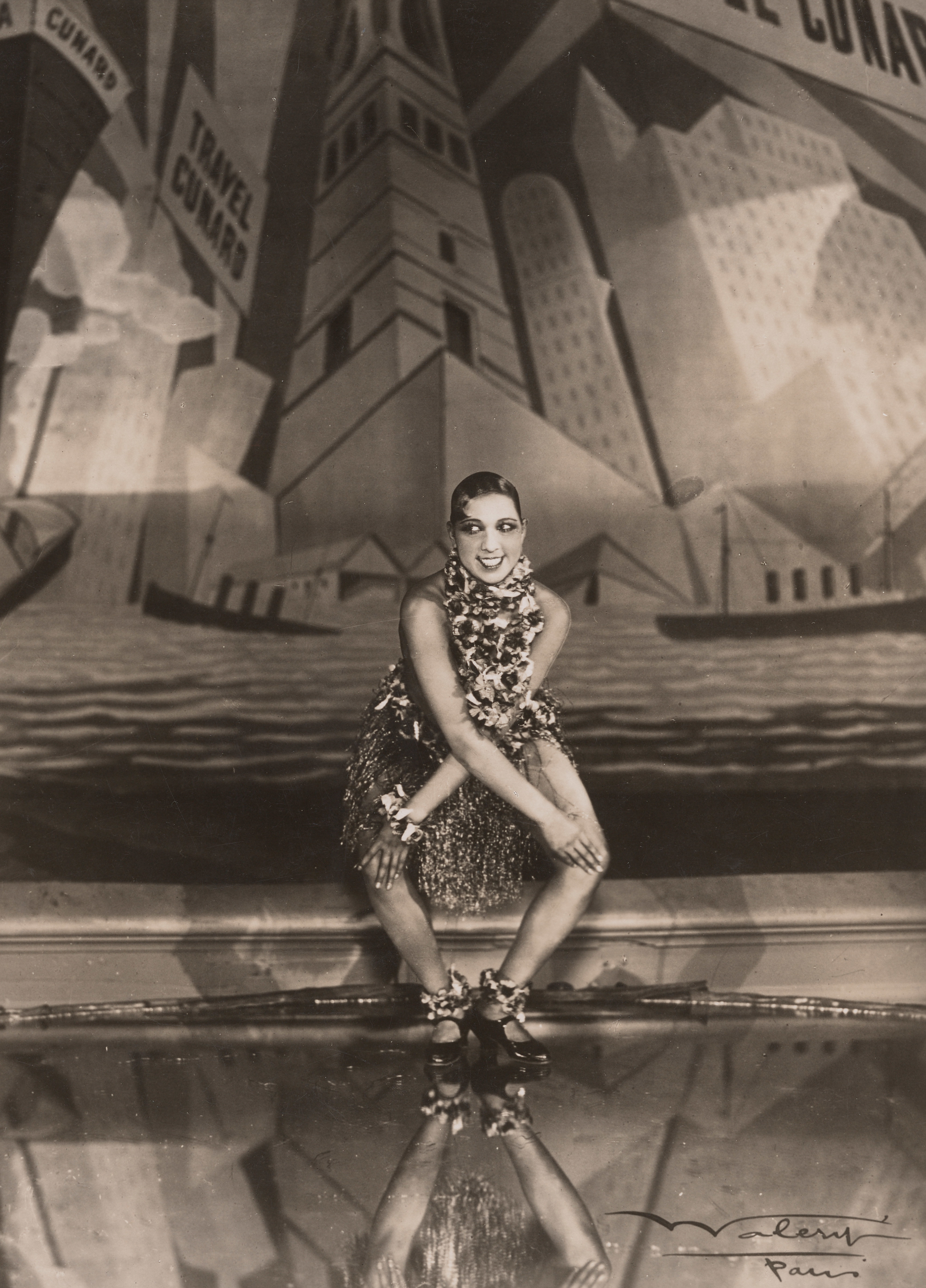
Josephine Baker doing the Charleston

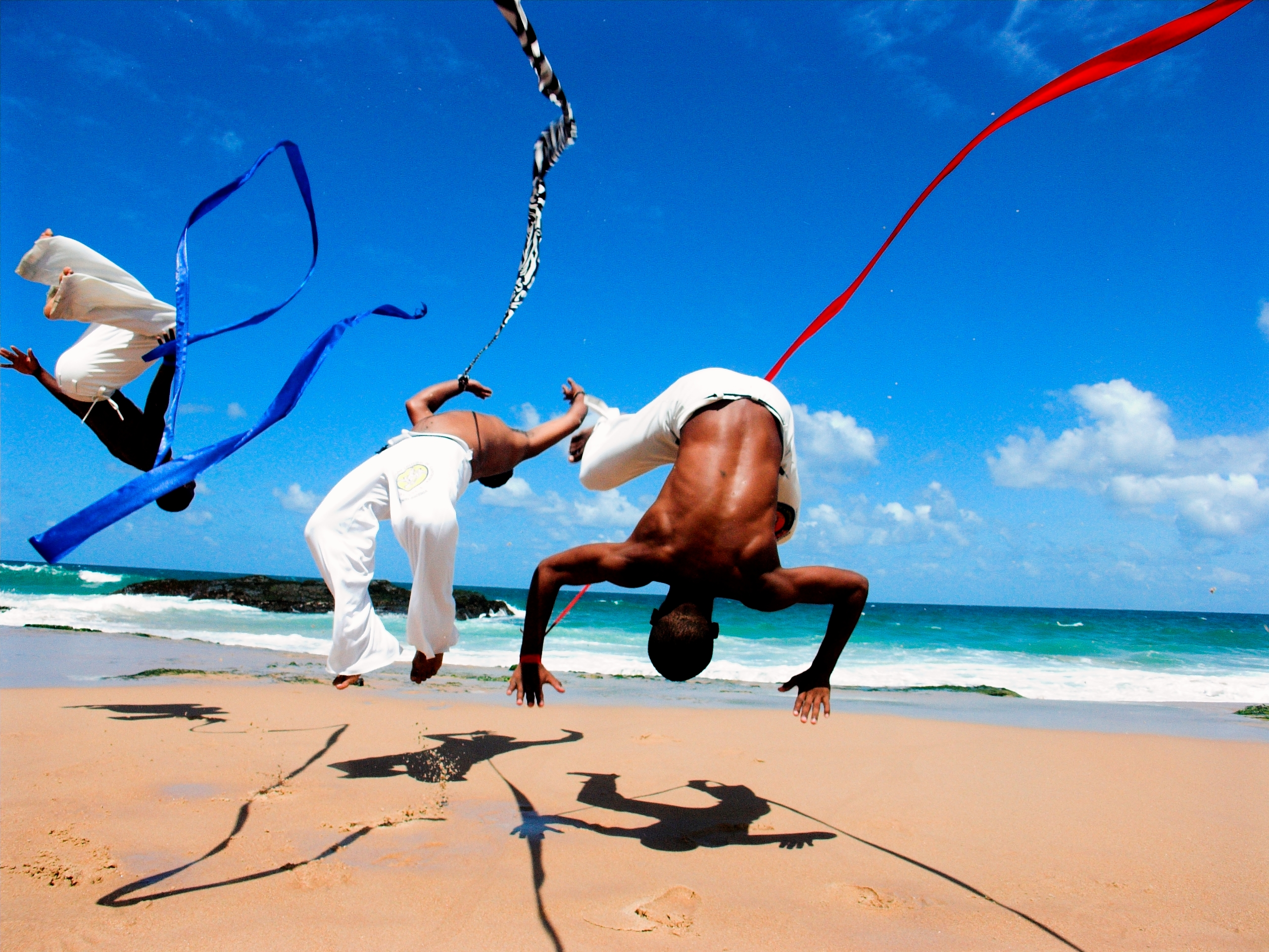
Brazilian capoeira

In Africa, music and dance were interwoven with daily life as well as with sacred traditions. Tribes danced to the beat of drums, and dances were led by acrobatic leaders who were frequently priests or holy men. African dance traditions survived the transatlantic Middle Passage because slave traders encouraged the enslaved Africans to dance on the ships to stay in shape. Other African dance traditions brought to the Americas and the Caribbean included improvisation, an orientation towards the earth, circularity and community, call-and-response, polyrhythms and the ring shout. When drumming was forbidden to slaves by their masters, they created complex percussive polyrhythms by clapping their hands and stomping their feet.

One dance that was adopted into the broader American culture is the Charleston. The Charleston was adapted from the ancient African dance of the Ashanti people. This dance and the Charleston have common movements. Similar dances were performed across the American South during slavery. "The Charleston is a dance that was performed by the descendants of African slaves in the American south. Like its sister vernacular form, jazz, from which it takes its rhythmic propulsion, it is a blend of African and European sources, and it has had a broad influence on American life and art. The name derives from the fact that the dance was supposedly seen performed by black dockworkers in Charleston, South Carolina. It is probable that they came from one of the black communities on an island off the coast." In 1923 the Charleston was made popular by African-American James P. Johnson.

Other popular dances of the 19th and 20th centuries with African-American roots include the cakewalk, the black bottom, the lindy hop, the jitterbug, the twist, break dancing and hip hop.

The African influence on Latin American dance included polycentric rhythms and movement, bent knees and a downward focus, improvisation, whole foot steps, body isolations, and exaggerated hip movements. These influences combined with indigenous and European traditions to create many of today's Latin dances, including salsa, samba, mambo merengue and bachata. Capoeira is a popular Brazilian dance and martial art form derived from the Engolo tradition of Angola that was originally brought by enslaved people to South America. Argentinian Tango was heavily influenced by the dance traditions of Africans in Argentina and Uruguay.

The traditional Afro-Haitian dance Yanvalou has roots in the voudou traditions of Benin, West Africa. The dance, a fusion of multiple ethnic traditions, united diverse groups of African descendants in the fight against slavery, with its spinning, undulating movements echoing the flexibility necessary to resist slavery.

== Religion ==
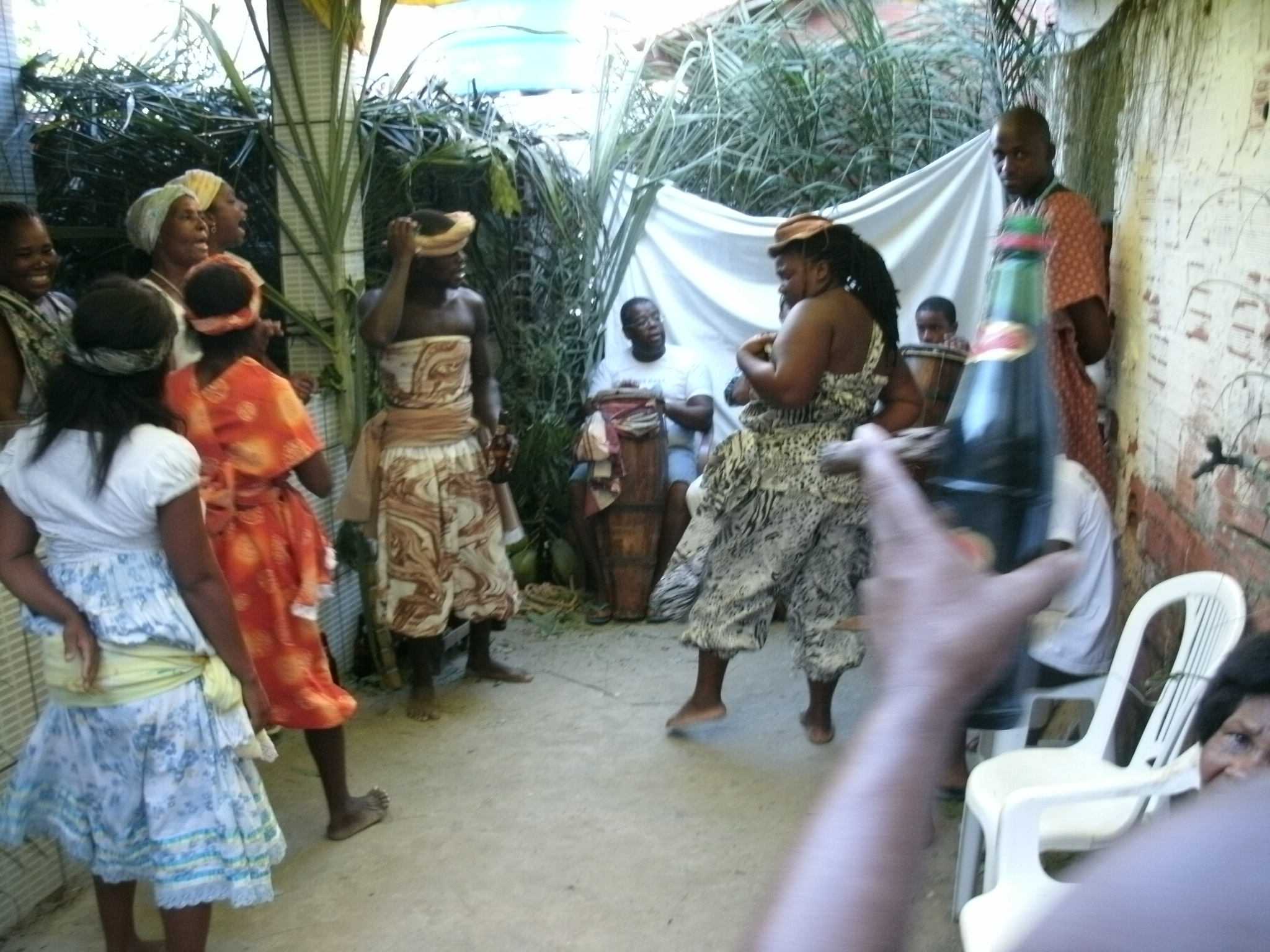
Candomblé ceremony in Itaparica, Brazil

Traditional African religions were not similar to later practices, which were influenced by the monotheistic beliefs of Christianity and Islam. These traditional religions were not supported by doctrine and were practised through living experiences, rituals and ceremonies. Beliefs and practices of West and Central Africa included a respect for the spiritual power of the ancestors, the worship of a pantheon of gods who oversaw aspects of daily life, the importance of the natural world, physical and spiritual healing, folk tales and ecstatic dance and song.

Some early enslaved Africans had been influenced by Portuguese Missionaries and brought Christian beliefs with them when they arrived in the Americas. But a scholar on the religion of enslaved people in North America, Albert J. Raboteau, has said "During the first 120 years of black slavery in British North America, Christianity made little headway in the slave population." Missionaries noted that slaves in the southern United States continued to hold on to African practices such as polygamy and "idolatrous dancing". During the Great Awakening religious revival of the 1740s, Christianity was increasingly adopted by enslaved people and used as a coping mechanism. Sects such as Baptists, Methodists, and Pentecostalists supported education, spirituality, and political views. Christianity offered a way for African-Americans to interpret their oppression, and as Black Christian Churches proliferated, they became centers of hope and resistance, incorporating traditional African call-and-response techniques as a way to unite preacher and congregation with spirit. Others created a syncretic Christianity which held on to earlier African practices and beliefs. In the United States and Haiti, this blend of Christianity and African traditions created new spiritual practices, like Hoodoo, Louisiana Voodoo and Voudoo.

Historians have estimated that somewhere between 10% and 30% of the enslaved people brought to America between 1711 and 1808 were Muslim. These people brought practices of prayer, fasting, diet, naming traditions and knowledge of the Qur'an with them.

The Yoruba religion of Western Nigeria and of Dahomey has continued in religious practices in the Americas that survived the Transatlantic Slave Trade and are still practiced in Havanah, Salvador, Brazil, and in Hispanic barrios of certain cities of the United States, especially Miami and New York. Candomble is a Brazilian religion that combines Yoruba, Fon and Bantu beliefs. Santeria in Cuba combines Yoruba and Catholic beliefs and practices.

== Cattle raising and cowboy culture ==
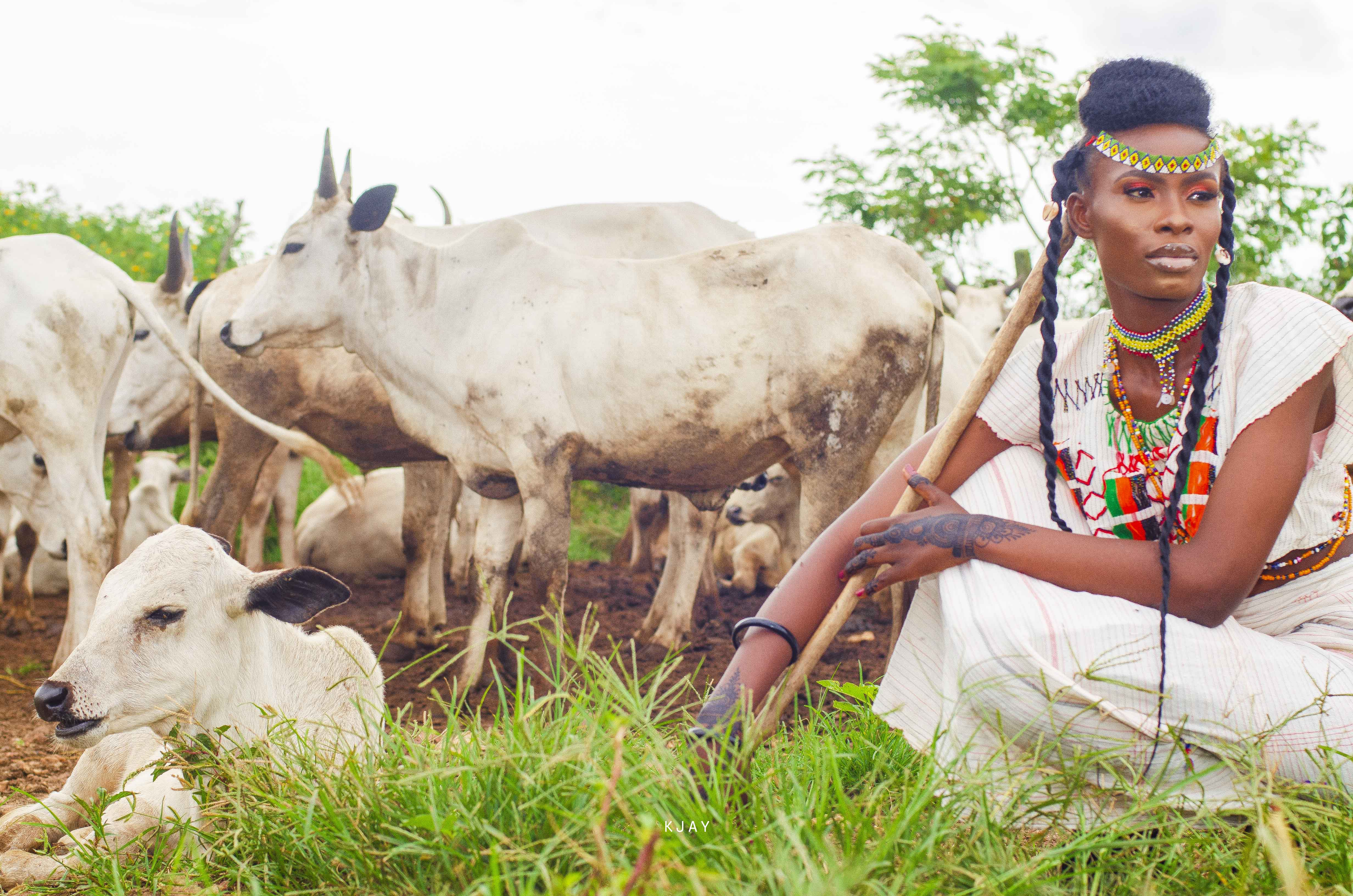
Fulani woman. Enslaved Fulani cattle herders introduced European-Americans to the practice of open cattle grazing.

Initially, European descendants in Colonial America raised their cattle in small herds confined to pastures. Texas longhorn cattle came to the Americas on the first slave ship to Mexico. Enslaved Fulani herdsmen and their descendants were expert cattlemen who were responsible for introducing the practice of open cattle grazing which is practiced today. As a result of their expertise, the American colonial cattle herd grew from 500 in 1731 to 6,784 30 years later. Historian Peter Wood says the word 'cowboy' originally referred to these enslaved cattlemen, just as a 'houseboy' was someone who worked in the home. After emancipation, Black cowboys continued to play an important role in American cowboy culture; at one point, one in five cowboys in the American West was Black. Words with African origins that made their way into American cowboy culture and songs include bronco, buckra, Buckaroo, and dogie.

== Medicine ==
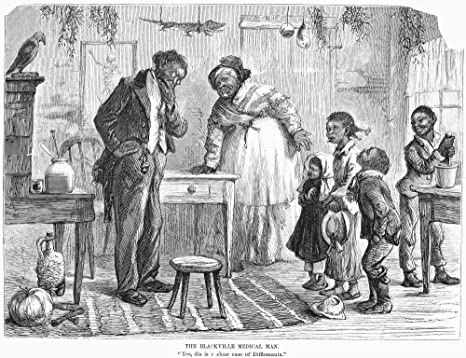
"Root doctors" developed cures for a variety of illnesses in the American South

The Akan of Ghana and the people of Gambia were observed in Africa by Europeans using small doses of smallpox serum to inoculate patients against smallpox. That practice, previously unknown to Europeans, was brought by Africans to the Americas. An enslaved man named Onesimums explained the procedure to Cotton Mather, which led to the development of the smallpox vaccine in the United States.

Scholar Joseph E. Holloway claims that the medical practices of the enslaved herbalists and root doctors who came to the Americas in the Colonial Era were "generally superior" to the European doctors of that time. An enslaved healer named Panpan was freed by Lieutenant Governor William Gooch because his herbal treatment was able to cure syphilis and yaws. Others were freed for developing herbal cures for a variety of ailments, including stomach problems and rattlesnake bites. Samson, the man who developed the rattlesnake bite cure, walked into the Commons House of Assembly in South Carolina in 1754 and pressed several rattlesnakes against his skin until they bit him. He then returned three days later, completely recovered, after using an herbal concoction to cure himself. He was freed and given a cash annuity for life. Enslaved Jane Minor was emancipated because of her medical expertise during an 1825 epidemic in Virginia and eventually ran her own hospital, using her earnings to free at least 16 slaves. Akan women used inoculation to prevent their children from getting yaws. African midwives brought their skills to the New World; midwives delivered 90% of babies during the antebellum era of the early 1800s.

== Folklore ==
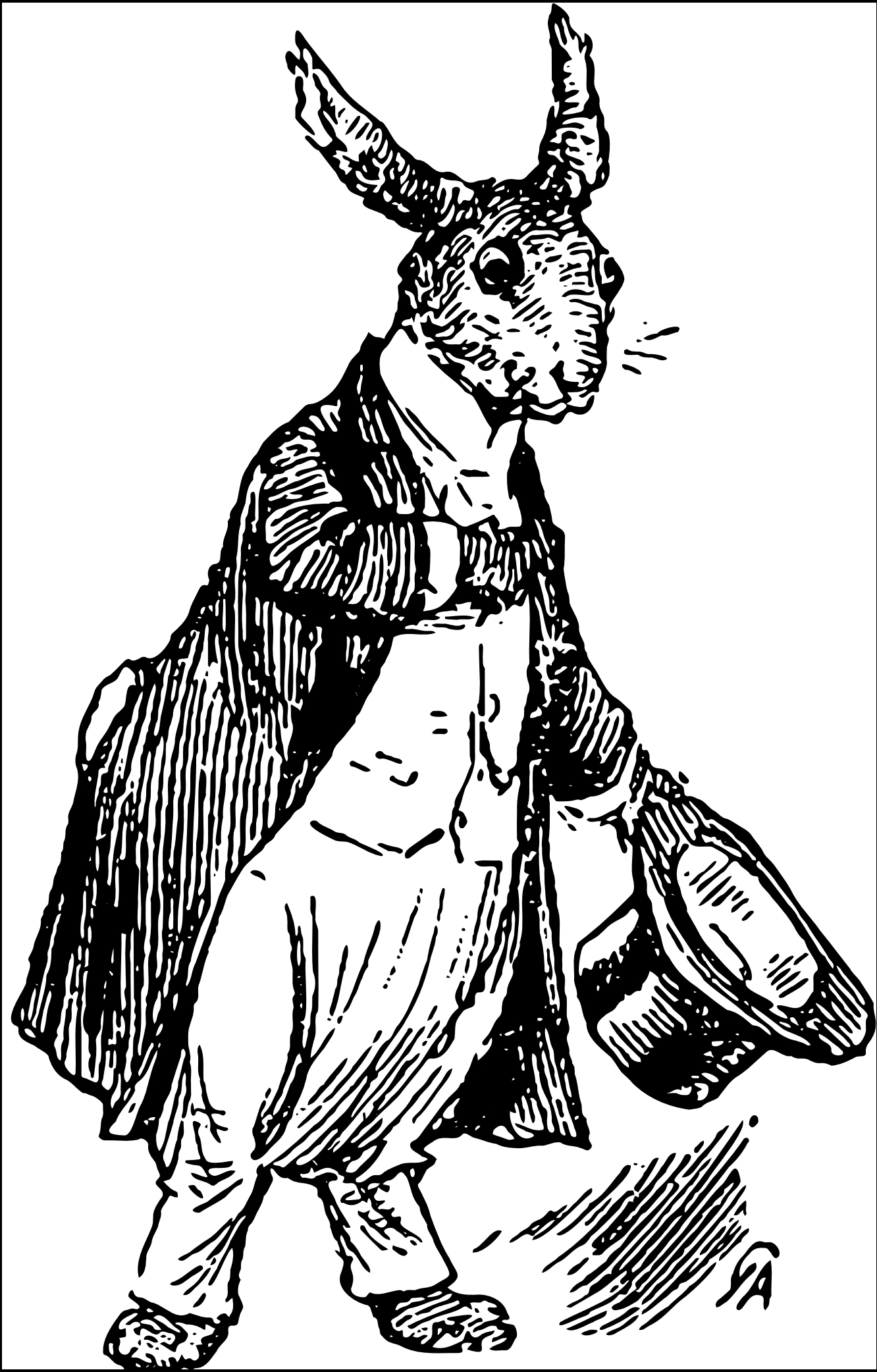
Brer Rabbit--

Africans crossing the Atlantic brought stories with them that were reframed and retold to reflect the new reality of slavery in the Americas, creating unique folktales and oral traditions of the African Diaspora. The Uncle Remus stories that were collected from Southern African Americans by Joel Chandler Harris in 1881 had their roots in diverse African animal fables that were brought to the United States by enslaved people. These fables often included a trickster character, similar to Brer Rabbit. The importance of Africa as homeland can be seen in the legend of Flying Africans who escape slavery by flying back to Africa, which has been retold all over the Americas and was included in a novel by Toni Morrison. High John the Conqueror is a trickster hero who in some tales is an African prince. Other elements of creative folklore that were brought to the Americas by Africans, particularly Angolans, included wrought iron work, basketry, weaving, pottery, clay figurines and grave decorations.
