= Kunyaza =

Sexual practice from Africa

Kunyaza is the Rwanda-Rundi name given to a sexual practice found in the Great Lakes region of East Africa which is meant to facilitate female orgasm and female ejaculation during intercourse.

== Terminology ==
The Rwanda-Rundi word kunyaza is derived from the verb kunyaàra, meaning "to urinate" but also signifying female ejaculation achieved by the practice. It is known with various names in different regions, the regular Ugandan term being kakyabali (often transliterated kachabali in anglicised spelling) or "Western Jazz" in slang, due to its prevalence in western regions such as Ankole. In that the term is now being used in English-language sources in Europe and North America, it can be considered an English word of African origin.

== Geographic extent ==
Kunyaza is present particularly in Rwanda, Burundi, western Uganda, western Tanzania, eastern Democratic Republic of Congo and some parts of Kenya. A 2008 survey with Rwandan male respondents suggested that female European visitors to the country are being introduced to the practice by local men. During the 2010s, the practice saw spread through social media to Kenya.

== History ==
Kunyaza is usually considered a traditional practice in Rwanda. Folk tradition suggests that it dates back to the Third Dynasty rule: as the story has it, the queen chose one of her guards to have sex with, but he suffered performance anxiety and failed to penetrate her. Instead, his penis rubbing against her labia and clitoris gave her satisfaction.

== Technique ==
Publicised by Dr. Nsekuye Bizimana as a secure means to achieve female orgasm, often in the form of ejaculation, kunyaza involves a non-penetrative and a penetrative phase in progression:

1. The male partner first stimulates the labia minora of the female partner by tapping and also rubbing with his penis and then, at a certain level of arousal, proceeds to stimulate the internal surfaces of the labia minora and the vulval vestibule, including the urinary meatus in the same manner, followed by stimulation of the clitoris, vulval vestibule, labia minora and the vaginal opening. Removal of the female partner's pubic hair is advised for more comfortable manipulation of the penis.
2. The male partner penetrates the vagina with alternating shallow thrusts (gucuga) at the vaginal opening with deep thrusts (gucumita) pushing against the cervix while maintaining exaggerated circular movements between vagina walls in a "screwing" fashion during penetration, often facilitating the movement by holding the penis between the middle and the index finger.

Nevertheless, other researchers emphasise that the version introduced by Dr. Bizimana diverts from the traditional kunyaza in fully omitting the labia elongation technique of gukuna, which is in fact seen as integral to kunyaza.

== Significance ==
As kunyaza involves some commitment of time, and, on the part of the man, restraint, it is posited as a relationship signifier. "A man only kunyazas a woman that he really cares for, whereas it would be odd to kunyaza a sex worker."

Kunyaza is "the easiest and most effective technique to achieve female ejaculation," according to American sexual health educator, Angelica Lindsey-Ali, also known as The Village Auntie. Rwandan sexologist Vestine Dusabe said that 90% of women experience female ejaculation from kunyaza.

Kunyaza is a recommended heterosexual practice for women to achieve sexual pleasure without penetration, according to international female magazine Cosmopolitan.

== In books and media ==
A formulated version of kunyaza was introduced to the Western public in books Weiblicher Orgasmus und weibliche Ejakulation dank afrikanischer Liebeskunst (2005) and Le secret de l’amour à l’africaine (2008) by traditional medicine specialist Nsekuye Bizimana, a Rwandan based in Germany. A Chinese translation of Le secret de l’amour à l’africaine was published in Hong Kong in 2010.

Kunyaza and other Rwandan sexual practices were featured in the TV5 Québec Canada documentary Le Sexe autour du monde: Rwanda aired in January 2011. The instructional DVD Kunyaza - Afrikanische Liebeskunst by erotic film director Pierre Roshan was released by German IntimateFilm in 2011. The practice (under the Ugandan name kachabali) was a topic in the SBS One documentary The Sunny Side of Sex: Uganda aired in December 2012. ProSieben news magazine Unter fremden Decken aired the episode Sex in Ruanda that focused on kunyaza in November 2013.

In 2016, the documentary Sacred Water by Belgian filmmaker Olivier Jourdain, which has kunyaza as the subject matter, premiered at the International Documentary Film Festival Amsterdam. The documentary was released on DocsOnline in 2017.

Kunyaza: The Secret to Female Pleasure (2018), by British Nigerian Habeeb Akande, is the first book published on the subject in English.

In May 2020, the BBC World Service broadcast "The Orgasm Gap", an episode of The Documentary Podcast as part of its Life Changes season. The two female reporters, named only as Lily and Kay, explore the omission of sexual pleasure from sex education in the UK, and travel to Rwanda to find out about Kunyaza, as a practise which focusses on female sexual pleasure, leading the woman to orgasm, and to "squirt", what is referred to as "sacred water". There they interviewed the sexologist Vestine Dusabe, but were concerned to discover that labia elongation was an associated cultural practice.
