= Bembe language (Kibembe) =

Bantu language spoken in the Republic of Congo

Bembe
- Kibembe / Kibeembe
- Native to: Republic of Congo
- Native speakers: Bembe: 100,000; Kambba: 1,500; Doondo: 30,000 (2007 census)
- Language family: Niger–Congo?: Atlantic–Congo; Benue–Congo; Southern Bantoid; Bantu (Zone H.10); Kongo; Bembe
- Dialects: Beembe; Kamba-Doondo; Hangala (Ghaangala)

Language codes
- ISO 639-3: Variously: beq – Bembe xku – Kamba dde – Doondo
- Glottolog: beem1239 Beembe kaam1238 Kaamba doon1238 Doondo
- Guthrie code: H.11,111,112

Bembe (Kibembe or Kibeembe) is a Bantu language spoken primarily in the Republic of Congo. It is closely related to Kikongo and forms part of the Kongo language cluster.

It should not be confused with the Bembe language (Ibembe) spoken in Congo-Kinshasa and Tanzania.

Maho (2009) considers Beembe, Kamba-Doondo, and Gangala (or Hangala, Gaangala, Haangala) to be distinct languages.

== Phonology ==
The language exhibits typical Bantu phonology, including a system of noun classes and verb conjugations. (Further details can be added as linguistic research becomes available.)

== Grammar ==
Bembe follows the noun class system characteristic of Bantu languages. Verbs are marked for tense, aspect, and subject agreement.
