= Wendy Oldfield =

South African singer (born 1964)

- Born: Cape Town, South Africa
- Occupations: Singer-songwriter, musician
- Instruments: Vocals, percussion
- Years active: 1983–present
- Website: www.wendyoldfield.co.za

Wendy Oldfield (born in Cape Town, South Africa) is a South African singer. At the age of nineteen, she formed the rock group The Sweatband, and from 1999 to 2001, she was involved with the band Mondetta.

== Career ==
In 1983, Oldfield was involved in the forming of Sweatband, a South African music group. She was the lead vocalist of the band, and released two albums. The group's biggest hit was "This Boy" which reached number 15 on the official South African top 20 in September 1986.

In 1988, five years after the formation of the band, she left the group and started her own solo career in the music industry.

Oldfield first rose to fame with the release of her debut album, Beautiful World. This album won her the 1992 Oktave award for Best Female Vocalist. Her song "Miracle" was nominated for Song of the Year.

Her song "Acid Rain" charted twice on South African radio, first in the original studio version and then in an "acid remix".

In 1998, she released her album Duwayo, and was nominated for a First National Bank Producer of the Year award. In 1999 she released the fourth album of her solo career, On a Pale Blue Dot, for which she won the FNB Pop Album of the Year award. She was also nominated for Best Female Vocalist.

For a short while she was involved with the band Mondetta (1999–2001), before releasing her fifth album Holy Water. At the ninth official South African Music Awards she received a nomination for the Best of Adult Contemporary award.

== Discography ==
=== Albums ===
- 1992 – Beautiful World
- 1996 – Ruby
- 1998 – Duwayo
- 2000– On a Pale Blue Dot
- 2002 – Holy Water
- 2008 – The Collection
- 2009 – Singalong Kidz
- 2013 – Supernova
- 2021 – Salt

=== Singles ===
- "Living in the Real World" – chart position – No. 1 on 5FM and Capital Radio.
