= Kunyi language =

Bantu language of the Republic of Congo

Kunyi
- Native to: Republic of the Congo
- Native speakers: (52,000 cited 1984 census)
- Language family: Niger–Congo?: Atlantic–Congo; Benue–Congo; Bantoid; Bantu (Zone H); Kongo (H.10); Kunyi

Language codes
- ISO 639-3: njx
- Glottolog: kuny1238
- Guthrie code: H.13

Kunyi is a Bantu language spoken in the Republic of the Congo.
