= Kituba language =

Creole language spoken in Central Africa

Kituba
- Kikongo ya leta
- Monokutuba, Munukutuba, Kituba (mkw); Kikongo ya leta (ktu)
- Speakers: L1: 17,000,000 (2024); L2: 1,200,000
- Language family: Kongo-based creole: Kituba
- Writing system: Latin, Mandombe

Official status
- Official language in: National language and unofficial language: Democratic Republic of the Congo; Republic of the Congo

Language codes
- ISO 639-3: Either: mkw – Kituba (RC) ktu – Kituba (DRC)
- Glottolog: kitu1246 DRC kitu1245 RC
- Guthrie code: H10A, B

Kituba (endonyms: Kituba, Kikongo ya leta) is a widely used lingua franca in Central Africa. It is a creole language based on Kikongo, a Bantu language. It is a national language in Republic of the Congo and Democratic Republic of the Congo.

== Names ==
Kituba is known by many names among its speakers. In academic circles, the language is called Kituba or Kikongo-Kituba.

In the Republic of the Congo, it is called Munukutuba (lit. 'I say'), and is used in the Republic's 1992 constitution. Kituba (lit. 'way of speaking') is used in the 2015 constitution.

In the Democratic Republic of the Congo, it is called Kikongo ya leta ("the state's Kikongo" or "Government Kikongo"), or Kikongo de l'État, shortened to Kileta. Confusingly, it is also called Kikongo, especially in areas that lack Kongo (Kikongo) speakers, namely the Kwango and Kwilu Provinces. The constitution of the Democratic Republic of the Congo lists "Kikongo" as one of the national languages. The Kikongo spoken alongside Lingala in urban centres is in fact Kituba.

There are also other historical names such as Kibula-matadi (lit. 'the stone-breaker's speech'), Ikeleve (lit. 'be not' or 'it isn't so'), Kikwango, Bastard Kikongo, and Kizabave (lit. 'do not know'), but they have largely fallen out of use.

== Geographic distribution ==
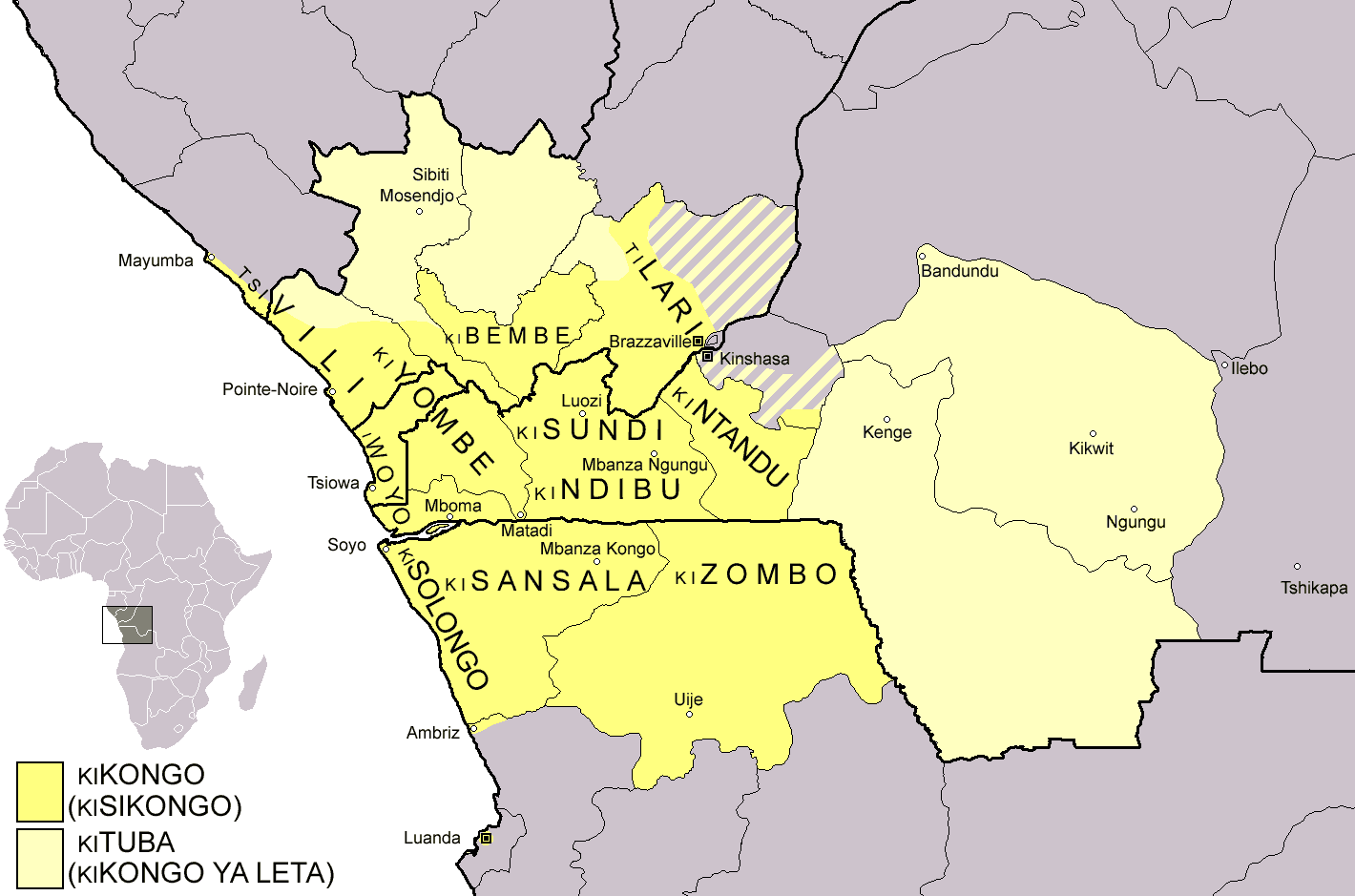
Dialect map of Kikongo and Kituba. NB: Kisikongo (also called Kisansala by some authors) is the Kikongo spoken in Mbanza Kongo. Kisikongo is not the protolanguage of the Kongo language cluster.

The majority of Kituba speakers live in the Democratic Republic of the Congo. It is spoken as the primary lingua franca in the provinces of Kongo Central, Kwango and Kwilu and to a lesser extent in Kinshasa, Mai-Ndombe and Kasai.

Kituba is spoken in the southern of the Republic of the Congo, in regions of Kouilou, Pointe-Noire, Niari, Bouenza, Lékoumou and in the capital Brazzaville. Lingala is more popular in the north.

Kituba is also spoken in the northern part of Angola, since modern nations cut across the lines of tribal areas and ancient kingdoms, and northern Angola borders the Kwango Province of the Democratic Republic of the Congo which is a strong Kituba-speaking area.

Although mutually intelligible, there are differences, mainly in vocabulary, between the eastern and western areas of The Democratic Republic of the Congo, and still more between the Kituba spoken there and that spoken in Congo-Brazzaville (Republic of Congo).

== Official status ==
Kituba is a national language in the Republic of Congo and the Democratic Republic of the Congo. In practice the term national language means that it is a language of regional administration, elementary education, and business.

A national language is also one that is used for public and mass communication. National public radios and televisions in the Democratic Republic of the Congo and in the Republic of Congo use Kituba as one of their main languages for evening news.

== History ==
There are several theories on how Kituba came into being. One theory claims that it had already evolved at the time of the Kongo Kingdom as a simplified interdialectal trade language, which the European colonists subsequently took into use for regional administration. Another theory claims that a simplified trade language called Kifyoti was developed at the Portuguese coastal trading 18 post and it was later spread upstream by the Christian missionaries to the region between the Kwango and the Kasai rivers where it evolved further (hence the name Kikwango). Yet another theory emphasizes the construction of the Matadi–Kinshasa railroad at the end of the 1800s, which involved forced labour from West Africa, lower Congo, and the neighbouring Bandundu region. The workers had diverse linguistic backgrounds which gave birth to a grammatically simplified language.

Harold W. Fehdereau, a linguist and missionary, carried out a major linguistic survey of Kituba-speaking areas under the joint auspices of the American Bible Society and the American Mennonite Brethren Mission. He published his work in a Kituba-French-English dictionary in 1969. He traced the development of Kituba back to the 1800s or earlier, necessitated by the inter-tribal needs of the Congolese themselves, and later, their relationship with slave traders. Then in the early 1900s, the Belgian and French colonization of the area brought further need for a convenient language of communication with the Congolese. He admits that we do not have a very complete picture of the development of Kituba before the 1930s, when it came into wide use by Christian missionaries. He notes that many today have grown up knowing Kituba as their mother tongue, and at the same time, it has reached some complexity of grammar unusual to pidgin languages. He notes that there is an increasing tendency, particularly in the western Kituba-speaking region, to borrow words from French, adding Kituba prefixes and suffixes for everyday usage.

Regardless of the genesis, Kituba established itself in the large towns that were found during the colonial period between 1885 and 1960. Kituba is spoken as the primary language in the large Bakongo cities of Moanda, Boma, Matadi, Pointe-Noire, Dolisie, Nkayi, and Brazzaville and also in large non-Bakongo cities of Bandundu, Kikwit, and Ilebo. It is the main language spoken throughout the modern provinces of Kwango and Kasai. A dialect called 'Monokutuba' is spoken in Congo-Brazzaville (Republic of Congo).

The first portions of the Bible were published in 1934, followed by the New Testament in 1950. A revision was published in 1957. The complete Bible was published in 1982, all by the Bible Society of Congo.

The Office of the High Commissioner for Human Rights has published a translation of Universal Declaration of Human Rights in Kituba.

On 27 June 2024 Google announced the addition of 110 languages, including Kituba and Kikongo, to Google Translate. However, it turns out that Google has only added Kituba and is also mistakenly calling it Kikongo.

What is generally referred to as Kikongo actually refers to a cluster of related languages, rather than a single language.

— Koen Bostoen and Gilles-Maurice de Schryver, In: Une archéologie des provinces septentrionales du royaume Kongo, 2018

== Differences between Kikongo and Kituba ==
Some examples of differences between Kikongo (Kisikongo, Kizombo, Kisolongo, Iwoyo, Kiyombe, Kisingombe, Kintandu, Kimanianga, Kindibu, Civili, Tsiladi (Lari), etc.) and Kituba (or Kikongo ya leta, Munukutuba, Monokutuba):

1. Conjugation: In Kikongo, the conjugation of a tense to different persons is done by changing verbal prefixes, unlike in Kituba:

Example: verb "to be" conjugated in the present in Kikongo and Kituba:

English	Kikongo (Civili)	Kikongo (Cibinda / Tchibinda)	Kituba (or Kikongo ya leta)
To Be	Kuba	Kuba or Uba	Kuvuanda or Kuvanda
I am	I ke (or I kele)	Nkele	Munu / Mono Ke (or Kele)
You are	Ke (or Kele)	Kele	Nge Ke (or Kele)
He / She is	Ke (or Kele)	Kele	Yandi Ke (or Kele)
We are	Tu ke (or Tu kele)	Tukele	Beto Ke (or Kele)
You are	Lu ke (or Lu kele)	Lukele	Beno Ke (or Kele)
They are	Ba ke (or Ba kele)/ Be ke (or Be kele)	Bakele	Bau / Bo Ke (or Kele)

2. Negative form

Kikongo	Kituba (or Kikongo ya leta)
K'usumbidi KO / Kusumbidi KO : You did not buy	Yandi ke na nsoni VÉ : He / She has no shame
KA tusingasala KO : We will not work	Munu / Mu ke mona nge VÉ : I can not see you
Luzingu lu kéli KUVÉ tok’ luboti, si sènde vandi si kéli : Life is not only made of roses, but also of thorns Etc.	Beto ke dia VÉ : We do not eat Yandi vuandaka kusala VÉ : He / She did not use to work Etc.

3. The way to say "My name is" is different :

My name is in Kikongo	My name is in Kituba (or Kikongo ya leta)
Nkumbu ame / Nkumbu ami / Nkumbu ani / Dizina diame (or zina diame) / Dizina diami (or zina diami) / Dizina diani (or zina diani) / Lizina liami, etc.	Zina na mono kele / Nkumbu ya mono kele / Nkumbu ya munu kele

4. Noun classes : noun prefixes are not completely the same (cf. the Kikongo and Kituba grammars)

== Phonology ==
=== Vowels ===
Kituba has five vowel phonemes: /a/, /e/, /i/, /o/, and /u/. They are very similar to the vowels of Spanish. Vowels are never reduced, regardless of stress. The vowels are pronounced as follows:

- /a/ is pronounced like the "a" in father
- /e/ is pronounced like the "e" in bed
- /i/ is pronounced like the "i" in ski or ring
- /o/ is pronounced like the first part of the "o" in home, or like a tenser version of "o" in "lot"
- /u/ is pronounced like the "oo" of fool

=== Consonants ===
		Labial		Alveolar/ Dental		Palatal	Velar		Glottal
Nasal			m		n			ŋ	
Plosive	plain	p	b	t	d		k	g	
Plosive	prenasal.	ᵐp	ᵐb	ⁿt	ⁿd		ᵑk	ᵑg	
Fricative	plain	f	v	s	z				(h)
Fricative	prenasal.	ᶬf	ᶬv	ⁿs	ⁿz				
Approximant			w		l	j			

Notes

- Word-initial voiceless prenasalized consonants are reduced to simple consonants in some dialects: and become and in Kituba of Pointe-Noire.
- Some dialects add stop to prenasalized alveolar fricatives: and become and ndzila.
- Alveolar fricatives may become postalveolar (ʃ or ʒ) before /i/.

== Grammar ==
=== Pronouns ===
Kituba has subject and object pronouns. The object pronouns are used in place of subject pronouns when the subject is being emphasized.

	Singular		Plural	
	Subject	Object	Subject	Object
1st person	mu	munu, mono	beto	beto
2nd person	nge	nge	beno	beno
3rd person	yá	yandi	ba	bau

I love you in kituba
Mu (or Munu, Mono) zola nge / Munu me zola nge / Mu me zola nge / Me zola nge / Mono (or Mu, Munu) ke zola nge

=== Nouns ===
Kituba has kept by and large the noun classes of ethnic Kikongo with some modifications. The classes 9 and 11 have in effect merged with the singular class with zero prefix, and their plural is formed with generic plural class prefix ba-.

Singular			Plural		
Class	Prefix	Example	Class	Prefix	Example
0	–	mama ('mother)	2	ba-	bamama (mothers)
1	mu-	muntu (person)	2	ba-	bantu (people)
3	mu-	mulangi (bottle)	4	mi-	milangi (bottles)
5	di-	dinkondo (banana)	6	ma-	mankondo (bananas)
7	ki-	kima (thing)	8	bi-	bima (things)
9	n-/m-	nkosi (lion)	2+9	ba-n-	bankosi (lions)
11	lu-	ludimi (tongue)	2+11	ba-lu-	baludimi (tongues)
12	ka-	kakima (trifle)	13	tu-	tubima (trifles)
14	bu	bumbote (goodness)			
15	ku-	kubanza (to think, thinking)			

=== Verbs ===
Kituba has a well-developed verbal system involving grammatical tense and aspect. Most verb forms have long and short versions. The long forms are used in formal written communication whereas the short forms have developed for spoken communication.

The irregular conjugation of the verb kuvanda or kuvuanda (to be) is presented in the table below. It is the only irregular verb in Kituba.

Tense	Long form	Short form	Example	Translation
Present and immediate future	kele	ke	Yau kele nkosi.	It is a lion.
Future	kele/ata kuv(u)anda	ke/ta v(u)anda	Mu ta vuanda tata.	I will be a father.
Present progressive	kele kuv(u)andaka	ke v(u)andaka	Nge ke vuandaka zoba.	You are being stupid.
Future progressive	ata kuv(u)andaka	ta v(u)andaka	Beno ta vuandaka ya kukuela.	You will be married.
Past	v(u)anda		Yandi vuanda kuna.	He was there.
Past progressive	v(u)andaka		Beto vuandaka banduku.	We used to be friends.
Past perfect	mene kuv(u)anda	me v(u)anda	Yandi me vuanda na Matadi.	He was in Matadi.
Past perfect progressive	mene kuv(u)andaka	me v(u)andaka	Yandi me vuandaka mulongi.	She has been a teacher.

All other verbs are conjugated with the help of auxiliary verbs. The conjugation of the verb kusala (to do) is presented in the table below.

Tense	Long form	Short form	Example	Translation
Present and immediate future	kele kusala	ke sala	Yandi ke sala.	He works. / He will work.
Present progressive	kele kusalaka	ke salaka	Yandi ke salaka.	He is working.
Past	salaka	salaka	Yandi salaka.	He worked.
Immediate past	mene sala	me sala	Yandi me sala.	He has worked.
Immediate past progressive	mene salaka	me salaka	Yandi me salaka.	He has been working.
Past progressive	vuandaka kusala	va sala	Yandi vuandaka kusala.	He used to work.
Narrative	sala	sala		
Future	ata sala	ta sala	Yandi ta sala.	He will work.
Future progressive	ata salaka	ta salaka	Yandi ta salaka.	He will be working.

== Voice ==
The suffix indicating voice is adding after the verb root and before the suffix indicating tense.

The most common forms are "ila", indicating action to or toward someone, and "ana", indicating mutual or reciprocal action:

Kutanga "to read", Tangila "read to", Tangilaka "read to" (past)

Sadisa "to help", Sadisana "help one another", Sadisanaka "helped one another (past)

== Dictionary ==
A Kituba-English-French dictionary compiled by linguist Harold W. Fehderau, Ph.D., was published in 1969. It is not widely available.

== Lexicon ==
The bulk of Kituba words come from Kikongo. Other Bantu languages have influenced it as well, including Kiyaka, Kimbala, Kisongo, Kiyansi, Lingala, and Swahili. In addition, many words have been borrowed from French, Portuguese, and English. These include:

- sandúku (Swah. sanduku) "box", the Swahili word comes from Arabic صندوق (ṣandūq)
- matáta (Swah. matata) "trouble"
- letá (Fr. l'état) "state"
- kamiyó (Fr. camion) "truck"
- sodá/solodá (Fr. soldat) "soldier"
- masínu (Fr. machine) "machine"
- mísa (Port. missa) "mass"
- kilápi (Port. lápis) "pen"
- katekisimu (Eng. catechism)
- bóyi (Eng. houseboy)
- sapatu (Port. sapato) "shoe"
- mesa (Port. mesa) "table"
- dikopa (Port. copa) "cup"
- simisi (Fr. chemise) "shirt"

== Sample text ==
Article 1 of the Universal Declaration of Human Rights translates to:

Bantu nyonso, na mbutukulu kevwandaka na kimpwanza ya bawu, ngenda mpe baluve ya mutindu mosi. Mayela na mbanzulu ke na bawu, ni yawu yina bafwana kusalasana na bumpangi.
"All human beings are born free and equal in dignity and rights. They are endowed with reason and conscience and should act towards one another in a spirit of brotherhood."

== Literature ==
In 2018, a book (Nelson Rolihlahla Mandela: Mbandu ya luzingu by Protais Yumbi) written in Kikongo ya Leta was nominated for the Grand Prix of Literary Associations. A hymnbook, Bankunga ya Kintwadi (Songs of Fellowship), was published in 1988 by the Mennonite Brethren Mission. It is widely used by numerous Protestant denominations. Almost a hundred Kituba-language books and articles have been published by Every Child Ministries' Mwinda Project. These include articles on Christian education, Bible lessons for children and youth, teacher training, health, and a variety of other topics. These are available on-line and at bookstores and libraries within the Democratic Republic of the Congo.

== See also ==
- Habla Congo, in Cuba
- Micronesian languages

== Bibliography ==
- Diener, Ingolf; Maillart, Diana.(1970).Petit vocabulaire Francais-Anglais-Munukutuba. Pointe-Noire.
- Jean-Alexis Mfoutou, Parlons munukutuba : Congo-Brazzaville, République démocratique du Congo, Angola, Paris, Editions L'Harmattan, 2019, 426 pages.
- Jean-Alexis Mfoutou, Pour une histoire du munukutuba, langue bantoue, Paris, Editions L'Harmattan, 2019, 130 pages.
- Jean-Alexis Mfoutou, Grammaire et lexique munukutuba : Congo-Brazzaville, République Démocratique du Congo, Angola, L'Harmattan, 2009, 344 p. (ISBN 2296226736 et 9782296226739, présentation en ligne, lire en ligne).
- Khabirov, Valeri.(1990). Monokutuba. Linguistic Encyclopedic Dictionary. Moscow. "Soviet Encyclopedia". P. 309-310 (In Russian)
- Fehderau, H., 1966. The Origin and Development of Kituba. PhD dissertation, Cornell University.
