= Suundi language =

Language

Suundi
- Kisuundi
- Native to: Republic of the Congo
- Native speakers: (120,000 cited 2000)
- Language family: Niger–Congo?: Atlantic–Congo; Benue–Congo; Bantoid; Bantu (Zone H); Kongo (H.10); Suundi

Language codes
- ISO 639-3: sdj
- Glottolog: suun1239
- Guthrie code: H.131

Suundi is a Bantu language spoken in the Republic of the Congo by the Sundi people.
