= Sacred Water =

- Directed by: Olivier Jourdain
- Release dates: 2016
- Running time: +56 minutes
- Countries: Rwanda, Belgium
- Languages: Kinyarwanda, English

Sacred Water is a 2016 Rwandan documentary film directed and produced by Olivier Jourdain.

== Plot ==
A young woman travelled to a village where kunyaza, a sexual technique to facilitate ejaculation by women, was practiced and was very important to men. The film explores and the cultural connotations attached to it.

== Cast ==
- Dusabe Vestine
