= Kongo languages =

Family of African languages

Kongo
- Kikongo
- Linguistic classification: Niger–Congo?: Atlantic–Congo; Volta-Congo; Benue–Congo; Bantoid; Southern Bantoid; Bantu (Zone H.10); Kongo–Yaka–Sira?; Kongo

Language codes
- Glottolog: kiko1235
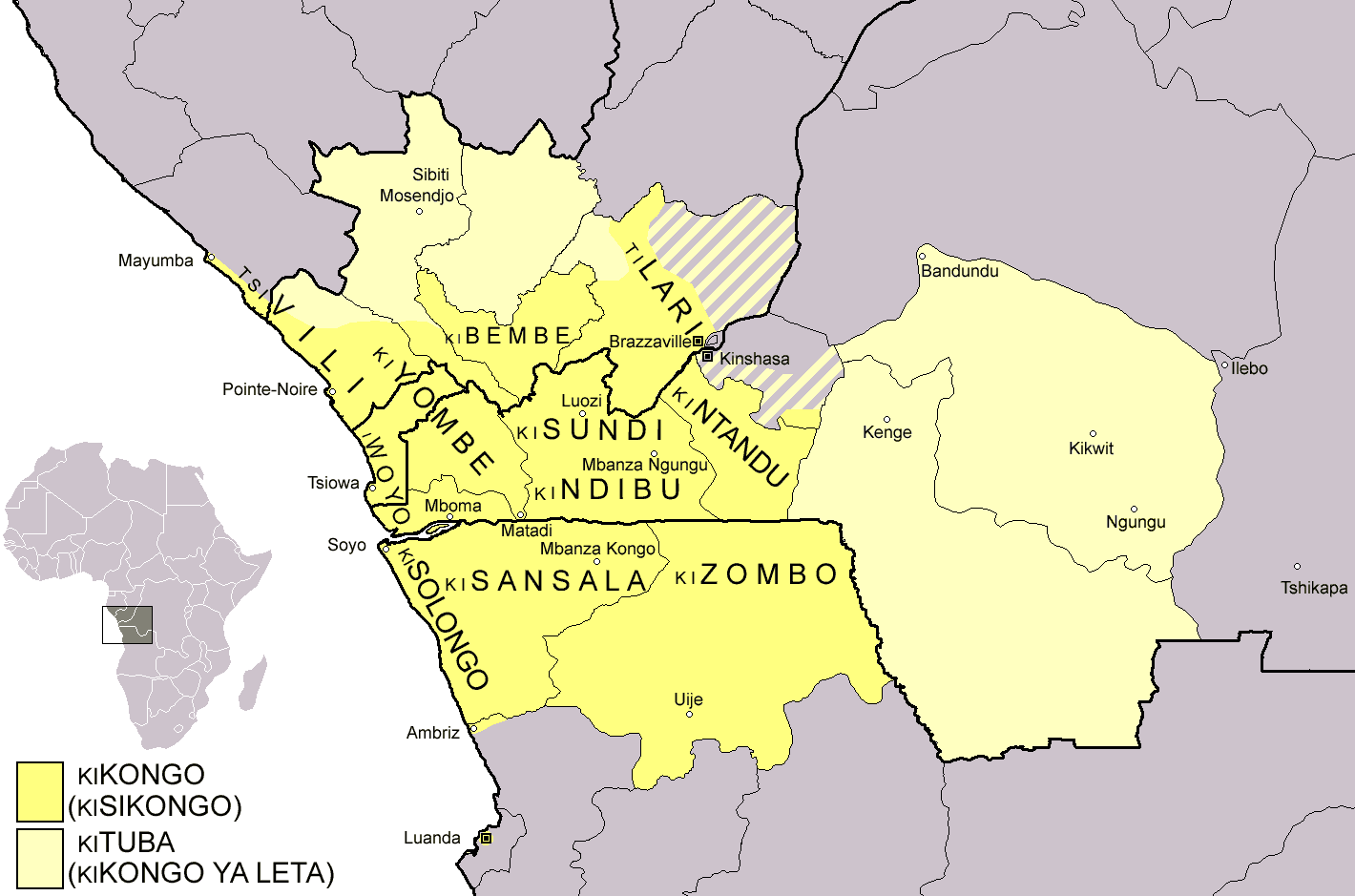
- Map of the area where Kongo and Kituba as the lingua franca are spoken.

The Kongo languages are a clade of Bantu languages, coded Zone H.10 in Guthrie's classification, that are spoken by the Bakongo:

Beembe (Pangwa, Doondo, Kamba, Gangala), Ndingi, Kunyi, Mboka, Kongo, Western Kongo, Laari (Laadi), Vili, Yombe, Suundi

== Languages ==
Glottolog, based on Koen Bostoen (2018, 2019), classifies two dozen languages of the Kongo language cluster as follows:

- Kikongo language cluster
  - Hungan-Samba: Hungan, Samba
  - Nuclear cluster
    - Yaka-Suku: Suku, Yaka-Pelende-Lonzo
    - "Kikongoic"
      - Beembe
      - Kambakunyic Kikongo
        - Kamba-Kunyi: Kaamba, Kunyi
        - Kilaadic Kikongo
          - Nuclear Northern Kikongo: Doondo, Laari, Suundi
          - Central-Southern Kikongo
            - Southeastern Kikongo
              - Eastern Kikongo
              - Southern Kikongo: Hungu-Pombo, Koongo-Kituba (Congo Kituba, DRC Kituba, South-Central Koongo)
            - West Kikongo
              - San Salvador Kongo
              - Yombe
              - Vilic
                - Vili
                - Lumbuic
                  - Lumbu, Bwisi
                  - Ngubi; Punu - Vumbu (Vungu), Sangu - Sira - Barama

These are closest to Mbuun, Ngongo and Nsong-Mpiin.
