= Holy Water (Wendy Oldfield album) =

Studio album by Wendy Oldfield
- Released: 2002
- Label: Tis

Wendy Oldfield chronology
On a Pale Blue Dot (2004)	Holy Water (2002)

Holy Water is the fifth solo album released by South African singer Wendy Oldfield. It was released in 2002. The album was rated as number 17 in the South African Rock Digest "Top 30 albums of 2002".

== Track listing ==
1. Life
2. Rain Won't Come
3. Holy Water
4. Touch Your Skin
5. Heaven
6. Sun
7. Knocking At The Door
8. How Come
9. (I Got) A Little Way To Go
10. Sun (Poplanet mix)
11. Holy Water (Temple mix)
