= Kongo language =

Bantu language of west-central Africa

Kongo
- Kikongo
- Native to: DR Congo (Kongo Central), Angola, Republic of the Congo, Gabon
- Ethnicity: Kongo
- Native speakers: (L1: 6.0 million cited 1982–2021); L2: 5.0 million (2021)
- Language family: Niger–Congo?: Atlantic–Congo; Volta-Congo; Benue–Congo; Bantoid; Southern Bantoid; Bantu (Zone H); Kongo-Yaka; Kongo languages (H.16); Kongo
- Writing system: Latin; Mandombe

Official status
- Official language in: National language and unofficial language: Angola

Language codes
- ISO 639-1: kg
- ISO 639-2: kon
- ISO 639-3: kon – inclusive code Individual codes: kng – Koongo ldi – Ladi, Laadi, Lari or Laari kwy – San Salvador Kongo (South) yom – Yombe
- Glottolog: yomb1244 Yombe
- Guthrie code: H.14–16
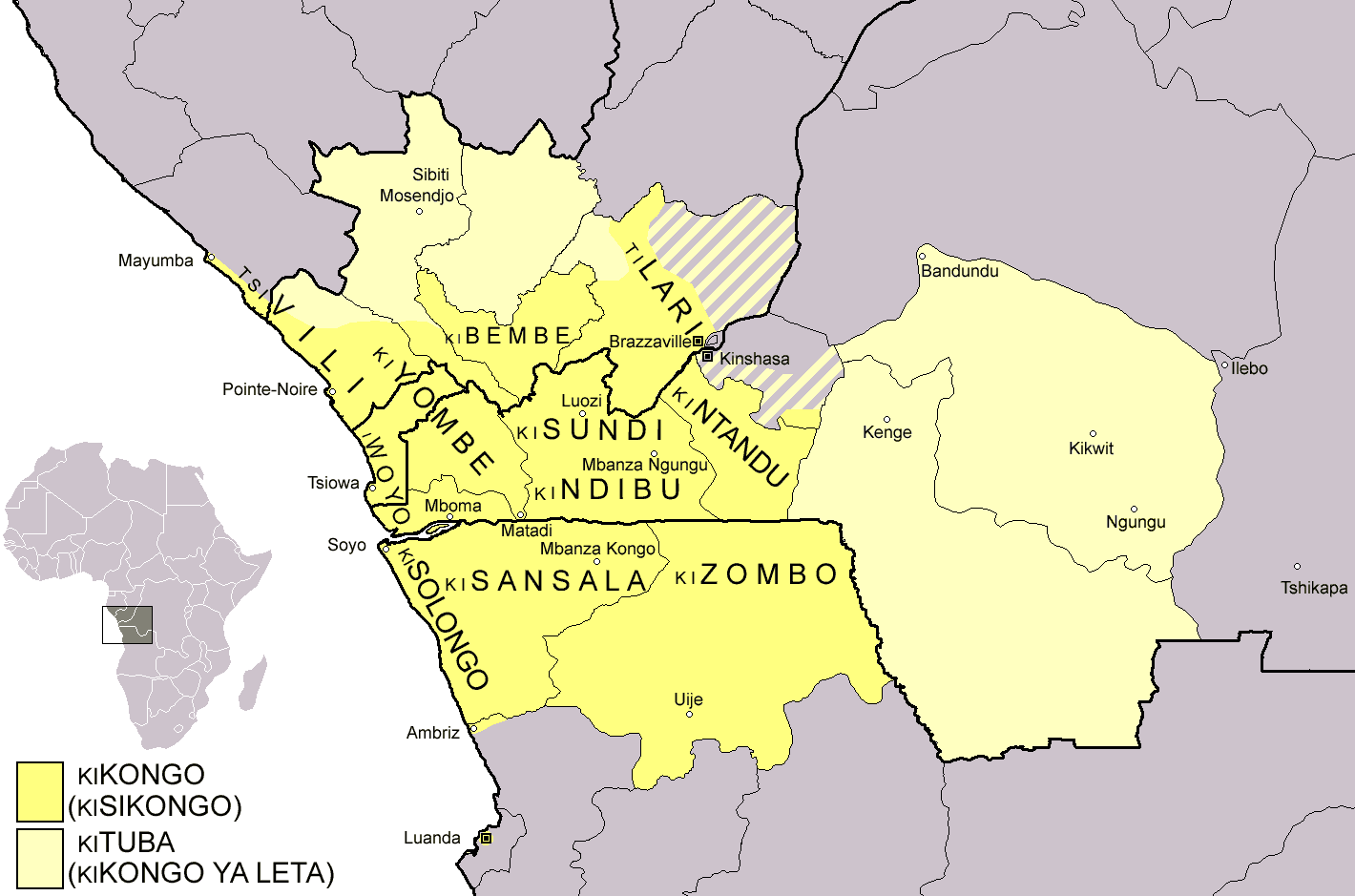
- Map of the area where Kongo and Kituba are spoken, Kituba as a lingua franca. Kisikongo (also called Kisansala by some authors) is the Kikongo spoken in Mbanza Kongo.

The Kongo language
- Person: muKongo, musi Kongo, muisi Kongo, mwisi Kongo, nKongo
- People: baKongo, bisi Kongo, besi Kongo, esiKongo, aKongo
- Language: kiKongo

Kongo or Kikongo is a Bantu language spoken by the Kongo people living in the Democratic Republic of the Congo (DRC), the Republic of the Congo, Gabon, and Angola. It is a tonal language. The vast majority of present-day speakers live in Africa. There are roughly seven million native speakers of Kongo in the above-named countries. An estimated five million more speakers use it as a second language.

Historically, it was spoken by many of those Africans who for centuries were taken captive, transported across the Atlantic, and sold as slaves in the Americas. For this reason, creolized forms of the language are found in ritual speech of Afro-American religions, especially in Brazil, Cuba, Puerto Rico, Dominican Republic, Haiti, and Suriname. It is also one of the sources of the Gullah language, which formed in the Low Country and Sea Islands of the United States Southeast, and a major source of the Palenquero language of Colombia.

== Geographic distribution ==
Kikongo was the language of the Kingdom of Kongo prior to the creation of Angola by the Portuguese Crown in 1575. The Berlin Conference (1884–1885) among major European powers divided the rest of the kingdom into three territories. These are now parts of the DRC (Kongo Central and Bandundu), the Republic of the Congo, and Gabon.

Kikongo is the base for the Creole language Kituba, also called Kikongo de l'État and Kikongo ya Leta (French and Kituba, respectively, for "Kikongo of the state administration" or "Kikongo of the State").

The constitution of the Republic of the Congo uses the name Kituba, and Democratic Republic of the Congo uses the term Kikongo (i.e. Kikongo ya Leta). This can be explained by the fact that Kikongo ya Leta is often mistakenly called Kikongo (i.e. KiNtandu, KiManianga, KiNdibu, etc.).

Kikongo and Kituba are spoken in:

- South of Republic of the Congo:
  - Kikongo (Yombe, Vili, Ladi, Sundi, etc.) and Kituba:
    - Kouilou,
    - Niari,
    - Bouenza,
    - Lékoumou,
    - south of Brazzaville,
    - Pointe-Noire,
  - Kikongo (Ladi, Kongo Boko, etc.):
    - Pool;
- South-west of Democratic Republic of the Congo:
  - Kikongo (Yombe, Ntandu, Ndibu, Manyanga, etc.) and Kikongo ya Leta:
    - Kongo Central,
    - a part of Kinshasa,
  - Kikongo ya Leta:
    - Kwilu,
    - Kwango,
    - Mai-Ndombe,
    - far west Kasaï;
- North of Angola:
  - Kikongo (Kisikongo, Zombo, Ibinda, etc.):
    - Cabinda,
    - Uíge,
    - Zaire,
    - north of Bengo and north of Cuanza Norte;
- South-West of Gabon.
  - Kikongo (Vili):
    - Nyanga,
    - Ngounié

=== Presence in the Americas ===
Many African slaves transported in the Atlantic slave trade spoke Kikongo. Its influence can be seen in many creole languages in the diaspora, such as:

- Brazil
  - Cupópia
    - Salto de Pirapora
- Colombia
  - Palenquero
    - San Basilio de Palenque
- Cuba
  - Habla Congo/Habla Bantu
    - None; liturgical language of the Afro-Cuban Palo religion.
- Haiti
  - Haitian Creole
    - Haiti
    - Bahamas
    - Cuba
    - Dominican Republic
    - United States
  - Langaj
    - None; liturgical language of the Haitian Vodou religion.
- Suriname
  - Saramaccan language
    - Boven Suriname
    - Brokopondo
    - Paramaribo
    - French Guiana
    - Netherlands
- United States
  - Gullah
    - Gullah-Geechee Corridor (North Carolina, South Carolina, Georgia, Florida)
  - Louisiana Creole
    - Louisiana; and neighboring states.

== People ==
Prior to the Berlin Conference, the people called themselves "Bisi Kongo" (plural) and "Mwisi Kongo" (singular). Today they call themselves "Bakongo" (pl.) and "Mukongo" (sing.).

== Writing ==
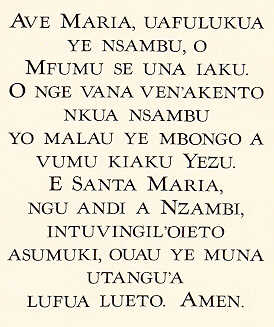
The Hail Mary in Kikongo

Kongo was the earliest Bantu language to be written in Latin characters. Portuguese created a dictionary in Kongo, the first of any Bantu language. A catechism was produced under the authority of Diogo Gomes, who was born in 1557 in Kongo to Portuguese parents and became a Jesuit priest. No version of that survives today.

In 1624, Mateus Cardoso, another Portuguese Jesuit, edited and published a Kongo translation of the Portuguese catechism compiled by Marcos Jorge. The preface says that the translation was done by Kongo teachers from São Salvador (modern Mbanza Kongo) and was probably partially the work of Félix do Espírito Santo (also a Kongo).

The dictionary was written in about 1648 for the use of Capuchin missionaries. The principal author was Manuel Robredo, a secular priest from Kongo (after he became a Capuchin, he was named Francisco de São Salvador). The back of this dictionary includes a two-page sermon written in Kongo. The dictionary has some 10,000 words.

In the 1780s, French Catholic missionaries to the Loango coast created additional dictionaries. Bernardo da Canecattim published a word list in 1805.

Baptist missionaries who arrived in Kongo in 1879 (from Great Britain) developed a modern orthography of the language.

American missionary W. Holman Bentley arranged for his Dictionary and Grammar of the Kongo Language to be published by the University of Michigan in 1887. In the preface, Bentley gave credit to Nlemvo, an African, for his assistance. He described "the methods he used to compile the dictionary, which included sorting and correcting 25,000 slips of paper containing words and their definitions." Eventually W. Holman Bentley, with the special assistance of João Lemvo, produced a complete Christian Bible in 1905.

The Office of the High Commissioner for Human Rights has published a translation of the Universal Declaration of Human Rights in Fiote.

== Standardisation ==
The work of English, Swedish and other missionaries in the 19th and 20th centuries, in collaboration with Kongo linguists and evangelists such as Ndo Nzuawu Nlemvo (or Ndo Nzwawu Nlemvo; Dom João in Portuguese) and Miguel NeKaka, marked the standardisation of Kikongo.

A large proportion of the people at San Salvador, and in its neighbourhood, pronounce s and z before i as sh and j; for the sound sh, the letter x was adopted (as in Portuguese), while z before i was written as j. Our books are read over a much wider area than the district of San Salvador, and in those parts where s and z remain unchanged before i, the use of x and j has proved a difficulty; it has therefore been decided to use s and z only, and in those parts where the sound of these letters is softened before i they will be naturally softened in pronunciation, and where they remain unchanged they will be pronounced as written.

— William Holman Bentley, Dictionary and grammar of the Kongo language as spoken at San Salvador, the ancient capital of the old Kongo Empire (1887)

== Linguistic classification ==
Kikongo belongs to the Bantu language family.

Malcolm Guthrie classified Kikongo in the language group H10, the Kongo languages. Other languages in the same group include Bembe (H11). Ethnologue 16 counts Ndingi (H14) and Mboka (H15) as dialects of Kongo, though it acknowledges they may be distinct languages.

Bastin, Coupez and Man's classification of the language (as Tervuren) is more recent and precise than that of Guthrie on Kikongo. The former say the language has the following dialects:

- Kikongo group H16
  - Southern Kikongo H16a
  - Central Kikongo H16b
  - Yombe (also called Kiyombe) H16c
  - Fiote H16d
  - Western Kikongo H16d
  - Bwende H16e
  - Ladi (Lari) H16f
  - Eastern Kikongo H16g
  - Southeastern Kikongo H16h

NB: Kisikongo is not the protolanguage of the Kongo language cluster. Not all varieties of Kikongo are mutually intelligible (for example, 1. Civili is better understood by Kiyombe- and Iwoyo-speakers than by Kisikongo- or Kimanianga-speakers; 2. Kimanianga is better understood by Kikongo of Boko and Kintandu-speakers than by Civili or Iwoyo-speakers).

== Phonology ==
Consonant phonemes
		Labial	Coronal	Dorsal
Nasal		m /m/	n /n/	(ng /ŋ/)
Plosive	voiceless	p /p/	t /t/	k /k/
Plosive	prenasal voiceless	mp /ᵐp/	nt /ⁿt/	nk /ᵑk/
Plosive	voiced	b /b/	d /d/	(g /ɡ/)^{1}
Plosive	prenasal voiced	mb /ᵐb/	nd /ⁿd/	ng /ᵑɡ/^{2}
Fricative	voiceless	f /f/	s /s/	
Fricative	prenasal voiceless	mf /ᶬf/	ns /ⁿs/	
Fricative	voiced	v /v/	z /z/	
Fricative	prenasal voiced	mv /ᶬv/	nz /ⁿz/	
Approximant		w /w/	l /l/	y /j/

Vowel phonemes
	Front	Back
High	i /i/	u /u/
Mid	e /e/	o /o/
Low	a /a/	

1. The phoneme /ɡ/ can occur, but is rarely used.
2. May also be heard as a nasal sound.

There is contrastive vowel length. /m/ and /n/ also have syllabic variants, which contrast with prenasalized consonants.

== Grammar ==
=== Noun classes ===
Kikongo has a system of 18 noun classes in which nouns are classified according to noun prefixes. Most of the classes go in pairs (singular and plural) except for the locative and infinitive classes which do not admit plurals.

Classes	Noun prefixes	Characteristics	Examples
1	**mu-, n-**	humans	muntu/muuntu/mutu/muutu (person, human)
2	**ba-, wa-, a-**	plural form of the class 1...	bantu/baantu/batu/baatu/wantu/antu (people, humans,)
3	**mu-, n-**	various: plants, inanimate...	muti/nti (tree), nlangu (water)
4	**mi-, n-, i-**	plural form of the class 3...	miti/minti/inti (trees), milangu/minlangu (waters)
5	**di-, li-**	various: body parts, vegetables...	didezo/lideso/lidezu/didezu (bean)
6	**ma-**	various : liquids, plural form of the class 5...	madezo/medeso/madeso/madezu (beans), maza/maamba/mamba/maampa/masi/masa (water)
7	**ki-, ci** (tchi/tshi) **-, tsi** (ti) **-, i-**	various: language, inanimate...	kikongo/cikongo/tsikongo/ikongo (kongo language), kikuku/cikuuku/tsikûku (kitchen)
8	**bi-**, **i-**, **yi-**, **u-**	plural form of the class 7...	bikuku/bikuuku/bikûku (kitchens)
9	**Ø-, n-, m-, yi-, i-**	various: animals, pets, artefacts...	nzo/nso (house), ngulu (pig)
10	**Ø-, n-, m-, si-, zi-, tsi-**	plural form of the classes 9, 11...	si nzo/zi nzo/zinzo/tsi nso (houses), si ngulu/zi ngulu/zingulu (pigs)
11	**lu-**	various: animals, artefacts, sites, attitudes, qualities, feeling...	lulendo (pride), lupangu/lupaangu (plot of land)
13	**tu-**	plural form of the classes 7 11...	tupangu/tupaangu (plots of land)
14	**bu-, wu-**	various: artefacts, sites, attitudes, qualities...	bumolo/bubolo (laziness)
15	**ku-, u-**	infinitives	kutuba/kutub'/utuba (to speak), kutanga/kutaangë/utanga (to read)
15a	**ku-**	body parts...	kulu (foot), koko/kooko (hand)
6	**ma-**	plural form of the class 15a...	malu (feet), moko/mooko (hands)
4	**mi-**	plural form of the class 15a...	miooko/mioko(hands)
16	**va-, ga- (ha-), fa-**	locatives (proximal, exact)	va nzo (near the house), fa (on, over), ga/ha (on), va (on)
17	**ku-**	locatives (distal, approximate)	ku vata (in the village), kuna (over there)
18	**mu-**	locatives (interior)	mu nzo (in the house)
19	**fi-, mua/mwa-**	diminutives	fi nzo (small house), fi nuni (nestling, fledgling, little bird), mua (or mwa) nuni (nestling, fledgling, little bird)

NB: Noun prefixes may or may not change from one Kikongo variant to another (e.g. class 7: the noun prefix ci is used in civili, iwoyo or ciladi (lari) and the noun prefix ki is used in kisikongo, kiyombe, kizombo, kimanianga,...).

=== Conjugation ===
Personal pronouns	Translation
Mono	I
Ngeye	You
Yandi	He or she
Kima	It (for an object / an animal / a thing, examples: a table, a knife,...)
Yeto / Beto	We
Yeno / Beno	You
Yawu / Bawu (or Bau)	They
Bima	They (for objects / animals / things, examples: tables, knives,...)

NB: Not all variants of Kikongo have completely the same personal pronouns and when conjugating verbs, the personal pronouns become stressed pronouns (see below and/or the references posted).

Conjugating the verb (mpanga in Kikongo) to be (kukala or kuba) in the present:

(Mono) **ngi**ena / Mono **ngi**na	(Me), I am
(Ngeye) **w**ena / Ngeye **w**ina / **w**una / **u**na	(You), you are
(Yandi) **w**ena / Yandi **k**ena / **w**una / **u**na	(Him / Her), he or she is
(Kima) **ki**ena	(It), it is (for an object / an animal / a thing, examples: a table, a knife,...)
(Beto) **tu**ena / Yeto **tu**ina / **tu**na	(Us), we are
(Beno) **lu**ena / Yeno **lu**ina / **lu**na	(You), you are
(Bawu) **b**ena / Yawu **b**ena	(Them), they are
(Bima) **bi**ena	(Them), they are (for objects / animals / things, examples: tables, knives,...)

In Kikongo, the verb (mpanga) "to have" is said as kukala ye also kuba na. The verb kuvua/kuvwa means "to possess" or "to have". It is conjugated in the present indicative as follows:

(Mono) **m**vuidi	(Me), I possess / I have
(Ngeye) **v**uidi	(You), you possess / you have
(Yandi) **v**uidi	(Him / Her), he or she possesses / he or she has
(Beto) **tu**vuidi	(Us), we possess / we have
(Beno) **lu**vuidi	(You), you possess / you have
(Bawu) **ba**vuidi	(Them), they possess / they have

NB: In Kikongo, the conjugation of a tense to different persons is done by changing verbal prefixes (highlighted in bold). These verbal prefixes are also personal pronouns. However, not all variants of Kikongo have completely the same verbal prefixes and the same verbs (cf. the references posted). The ksludotique site uses several variants of Kikongo (kimanianga,...).

== Vocabulary ==
Word	Translation
kiambote, yenge (kiaku, kieno) / mbot'aku / mbotieno (mboti'eno) / mbote zeno / mbote / mboti / mboto / bueke / buekanu	hello, good morning
malafu, malavu	alcoholic drink
diamba	hemp
binkutu, binkuti	clothes
ntoto, mutoto	soil, floor, ground, Earth
nsi, tsi, si	country, province, region
vata, gata, divata, digata, dihata, diɣata, buala (or bwala), bual' (or bwal', bualë, bwalë), bula, hata, ɣata	village
mavata, magata, mahata, maɣata, mala, maala	villages
nzo	house
zulu, yulu, yilu	sky, top, above
maza, masa, mamba, maamba, masi, nlangu, mazi, maampa	water
tiya, mbasu, mbawu	fire
makaya	leaves (example : hemp leaves)
bakala, yakala	man, husband
nkento, mukento, nkiento, ncyento, nciento, ntchiento, ntchientu, ntchetu, ntcheetu, ncetu, nceetu, mukietu, mukeetu, mukeeto	woman
mukazi, nkazi, nkasi, mukasi	spouse (wife)
mulumi, nlumi, nnuni	spouse (husband)
muana (or mwana) ndumba, ndumba	young girl, single young woman
nkumbu / zina / li zina / dizina / ligina	name
kudia, kudya, kulia, kulya	to eat
kunua, kunwa	to drink
nene	big
fioti	small
mpimpa	night
lumbu	day
kukovola, kukofola, kukofula, kukoola, kukogola, kukohola, kukosula	to cough
kuvana, kugana, kuhana, kuɣana	to give
nzola, zola	love
luzolo, luzolu	love, will
kutanga, kutaangë	to read
kusoneka, kusonikë, kusonika, kusonik', kutina	to write
kuvova, kuta, kuzonza, kutuba, kutub', kugoga, kuɣoɣa, kuhoha, utuba	to say, to speak, to talk, to tell
kuzola, kutsola, kutsolo, kuzolo, uzola	to love
ntangu	time, sun, hour
kuseva, kusega, kuseɣa, kuseha, kusefa, kusefë, kusef', kuseya	to laugh
nzambi	god
luzitu	the respect
lufua, lufwa	the death
yi ku zolele / i ku zolele / ngeye nzolele / ni ku zololo (or ni ku zolele) (Ladi) / minu i ku zoleze (Ibinda) / mi ya ku zola (Vili) / minu i ku tidi (Cabindan Yombe) / mê nge nzololo (or mê nge nzolele) (Ladi) / minu i ku zoleze (Cabindan Woyo) / minu i ba ku zola (Linji, Linge) / mi be ku zol' (or mi be ku zolë) (Vili) / me ni ku tiri (Beembe) / minu i ku tili	i love you

Days of the week in English	Kisikongo and Kizombo	Congolese Yombe	Ladi (Lari)	Vili	Ibinda	Ntandu	Kisingombe and Kimanianga
Monday	Kyamosi	Un'tône	Buduka / Nsila	Un'tône	Tchikunda	Kintete	Kiamonde / Kiantete
Tuesday	Kyazole	N'silu	Nkênge	N'silu	Tchimuali / Tchimwali	Kinzole	Kianzole
Wednesday	Kyatatu	Un'duka	Mpika	Un'duk'	Tchintatu	Kintatu	Kiantatu
Thursday	Kyaya	N'sone	Nkôyi	N'sone	Tchinna	Kinya	Kianya
Friday	Kyatanu	Bukonzu	Bukônzo	Bukonz'	Tchintanu	Kintanu	Kiantanu
Saturday	Kyasabala	Sab'l	Saba / Sabala	Sab'l	Tchisabala	Sabala	Kiasabala
Sunday	Kyalumingu	Lumingu	Lumîngu / Nsona	Lumingu	Tchilumingu	Lumingu	Kialumingu

Numbers 1 to 10 in English	Kisikongo and Kizombo	Ladi (Lari)	Ntandu	Solongo	Yombe	Beembe	Vili	Kisingombe and Kimanianga	Ibinda
One	Mosi	Mosi	Mosi	Mosi / Kosi	Mosi	Mosi	Muek' / Mesi	Mosi	Mueka / Tchimueka
Two	Zole	Zole	Zole	Zole	Wadi	Boolo / Biole	Wali	Zole	Wali
Three	Tatu	Tatu	Tatu	Tatu	Tatu	Tatu / Bitatu	Tatu	Tatu	Tatu
Four	Ya	Ya	Ya	Ya	Ya	Na / Bina	Na	Ya	Na
Five	Tanu	Tanu	Tanu	Tanu	Tanu	Taanu / Bitane	Tanu	Tanu	Tanu
Six	Sambanu	Sambanu	Sambanu	Nsambanu / Sambanu	Sambanu	Saambanu / Saamunu / Samne	Samunu	Sambanu	Sambanu
Seven	Nsambuadi (Nsambwadi) / Nsambuadia (Nsambwadia)	Nsambuadi (Nsambwadi)	Sambuadi (Sambwadi)	Nsambuadi (Nsambwadi) / Sambuadi (Sambwadi)	Tsambuadi (Tsambwadi)	Tsambe	Sambuali (Sambwali)	Nsambuadi (Nsambwadi) / Nsambodia	Sambuali (Sambwali)
Eight	Nana	Nana / Mpoomo / Mpuomô	Nana	Nana	Dinana	Mpoomo	Nana	Nana	Nana
Nine	Vua (Vwa) / Vue (Vwe)	Vua (Vwa)	Vua (Vwa)	Vua (Vwa)	Divua (Divwa)	Wa	Vua (Vwa)	Vua (Vwa)	Vua (Vwa)
Ten	Kumi	Kumi	Kumi / Kumi dimosi	Kumi	Dikumi	Kumi	Kumi	Kumi	Kumi

=== English words of Kongo origin ===
- The southern Black American English word "goober" comes from Kongo nguba, meaning "peanut".
- The southern Black American English word "finda", from the Hoodoo tradition, comes from the Kongo word mfinda, meaning "the great forest".
- The southern Black American English word "mojo", from the Hoodoo tradition, comes from the Kongo word mooyo, meaning "to the spirits that dwelt within magical charms".
- The Black American popular music terms "funk" and "funky" may be from the Kongo word lu-fuki.

== In popular culture ==
The roller coaster Kumba at Busch Gardens Tampa Bay in Tampa, Florida, gets its name from the Kongo word for "roar".

== Sample text ==
According to Filomão CUBOLA, article 1 of the Universal Declaration of Human Rights in Fiote translates to:

Bizingi bioso bisiwu ti batu bambutukanga mu kidedi ki buzitu ayi kibumswa. Bizingi-bene, batu, badi diela ayi tsi-ntima, bafwene kuzingila mbatzi-na-mbatzi-yandi mu mtima bukhomba.
"All human beings are born free and equal in dignity and rights. They are endowed with reason and conscience and should act towards one another in a spirit of brotherhood."

== Literature ==
- Mgr. Jean Cuvelier, Nkutama a mvila za Makanda, Impr. Mission Catholique, 1934
- A. Fu-kiau kia Bunseki-Lumanisa, N'Kongo Ye Nza Yakun'zungidila : Nza-Kôngo, Office National de la Recherche et de Développement, Kinshasa, 1969 (Réimpression 2021, Paari éditeur).
- Rodrigue Tchamna and Imanuel Kimbuala Hemsey, Wasala wûnu, si kadia mbazi. Wavuata kimôlo wûnu, si kalaba mbazi, Cameroun BD, 2019.
- Jussie Nsana and Armel Bemba, M'tekolo, Nsana-Arts Butsiele and Ecole Les Bourgeons, 2020.
- Fernando Ndombele Kidima Tadi, Malongi ma mpila mu mpila muna ndinga kikongo, Mayamba, 2023.
