= Mumbo jumbo (phrase) =

Phrase for confusing or meaningless language

Believers in the "heathen" god Mumbo Jumbo are contrasted favorably with World War I-era Christendom in this March 1915 cartoon from The National Rip-Saw, a socialist monthly.

Mumbo jumbo, or mumbo-jumbo, is confusing or meaningless language. The phrase is often used to express humorous criticism of middle-management, and specialty jargon, such as legalese, that non-specialists have difficulty in understanding. For example, "I don't understand all that legal mumbo jumbo in the fine print."

It may also refer to practices based on superstition and rituals intended to cause confusion, or languages that the speaker does not understand.

== Origins ==
Mumbo Jumbo is a West African phrase often cited by historians and etymologists as deriving from the Mandinka word "Maamajomboo", which refers to a masked male dancer who takes part in religious ceremonies and community disputes. Mungo Park's travel journal Travels in the Interior of Africa (1795) describes 'Mumbo Jumbo' as a character, complete with "masquerade habit", whom Mandinka males would dress up as in order to resolve domestic disputes.

According to the Concise Oxford English Dictionary:

Mumbo Jumbo is a noun and is the name of a grotesque idol said to have been worshipped by some tribes. In its figurative sense, Mumbo Jumbo is an object of senseless veneration or a meaningless ritual.

According to the 1803 Supplement to Encyclopædia Britannica Third Edition:

Mumbo Jumbo: A strange bugbear employed by the Pagan Mandingos for the purpose of keeping their women in subjection. Polygamy being allowed among these people, every man marries as many wives as he can conveniently maintain; and the consequence is, that family quarrels sometimes rise to such a height, that the husband's authority is not sufficient to restore peace among the ladies. On these occasions, the interposition of Mumbo Jumbo is called in; and it is always decisive. This strange minister of justice, who is either the husband himself, or some person instructed by him, disguised in a sort of masquerade habit, made of the bark of trees, and armed with the rod of public authority, announces his coming by loud and dismal screams in the woods near the town. He begins his pantomime at the approach of night; and as soon as it is dark, he enters the town, and proceeds to the Bentung or market-place, at which all the inhabitants immediately assemble.....the ceremony commences with songs and dances, which continue till midnight, about which time Mumbo fixes on the offender. This unfortunate victim being thereupon immediately seized, is stripped naked, tied to a post, and severely scourged with Mumbo's rod, amidst the shouts and derision of the whole assembly; and it is remarkable, that the rest of the women are the loudest in their exclamations on this occasion against their unhappy sister. Daylight puts an end to this indecent and unmanly revel....That the women are deluded seems evident; for Mr. Park assures us, that the dress of Mumbo is suffered to hang from a tree at the entrance of each town; which would hardly be the case if the women were not persuaded that it is the dress of some supernatural being.

== Usage ==
- The phrase appears in Charles Dickens' Little Dorrit, originally published in serial form between 1855 and 1857. "He never dreamed of disputing their pretensions, but did homage to the miserable Mumbo jumbo they paraded."
- It also appears in Thomas Hardy's A Pair of Blue Eyes published in 1873. 'A cracked edifice was a species of Mumbo Jumbo'.
- First published in 1899, The Story of Little Black Sambo has a titular protagonist whose parents are named "Black Mumbo" and "Black Jumbo".
- In 1972, Ishmael Reed wrote a postmodern novel titled Mumbo Jumbo which addresses a wide array of influences on African diaspora and culture, including historical realities like the Scramble for Africa and the Atlantic slave trade as well as its invented influences like the "Jes Grew" virus. The novel includes an etymology taken from the first edition of the American Heritage Dictionary that derives the phrase Mumbo Jumbo from the Mandingo mā-mā-gyo-mbō, meaning a "magician who makes the troubled spirits of ancestors go away." While the novel quotes this dictionary entry and includes a lengthy bibliography, the work is largely fictional and regularly blurs the line between fact and fiction. The title can also be interpreted to refer to the notion that postmodern works like Mumbo Jumbo are often dismissed as nonsensical.
- The Story of an African Farm, an 1883 novel by Olive Schreiner, refers to half of a "Mumboo-jumbow idol [that] leaves us utterly in the dark as to what the rest was like." Its reference symbolizes the confusion and lack of descriptiveness that came from such an idol.
- In his preface to Frantz Fanon's The Wretched of the Earth, Jean-Paul Sartre uses the phrase when speaking of revolutionary violence being diverted into native African religion: "Mumbo-Jumbo and all the idols of the tribe come down among them, rule over their violence and waste it in trances until it is exhausted".
- In Vachel Lindsay's poem The Congo, Mumbo Jumbo is used as a metaphor for the pagan religion followed by the Africans he encounters. The poem, at the end of each of three sections, repeats the phrase "Mumbo Jumbo will hoodoo you".
- In Stranger In A Strange Land by Robert Heinlein, the character Jubal Harshaw speaks of Mumbo Jumbo as the "God of the Congo" towards the end of the novel in a discourse on the meaning of religions.
- In Roots by Alex Haley, the Mumbo Jumbo is also mentioned in the context of tribal men disciplining disobedient wives.
- In the 1928 novel The Twelve Chairs, when describing the limited vocabulary of one character, it is stated that "The lexicon of a Negro from the cannibalistic tribe Mumbo-Jumbo comprises three hundred words."

== See also ==
- Gibberish
- Jargon
- Mambo (Vodou)
- Simlish
- Superstition
