= Lapa (structure) =

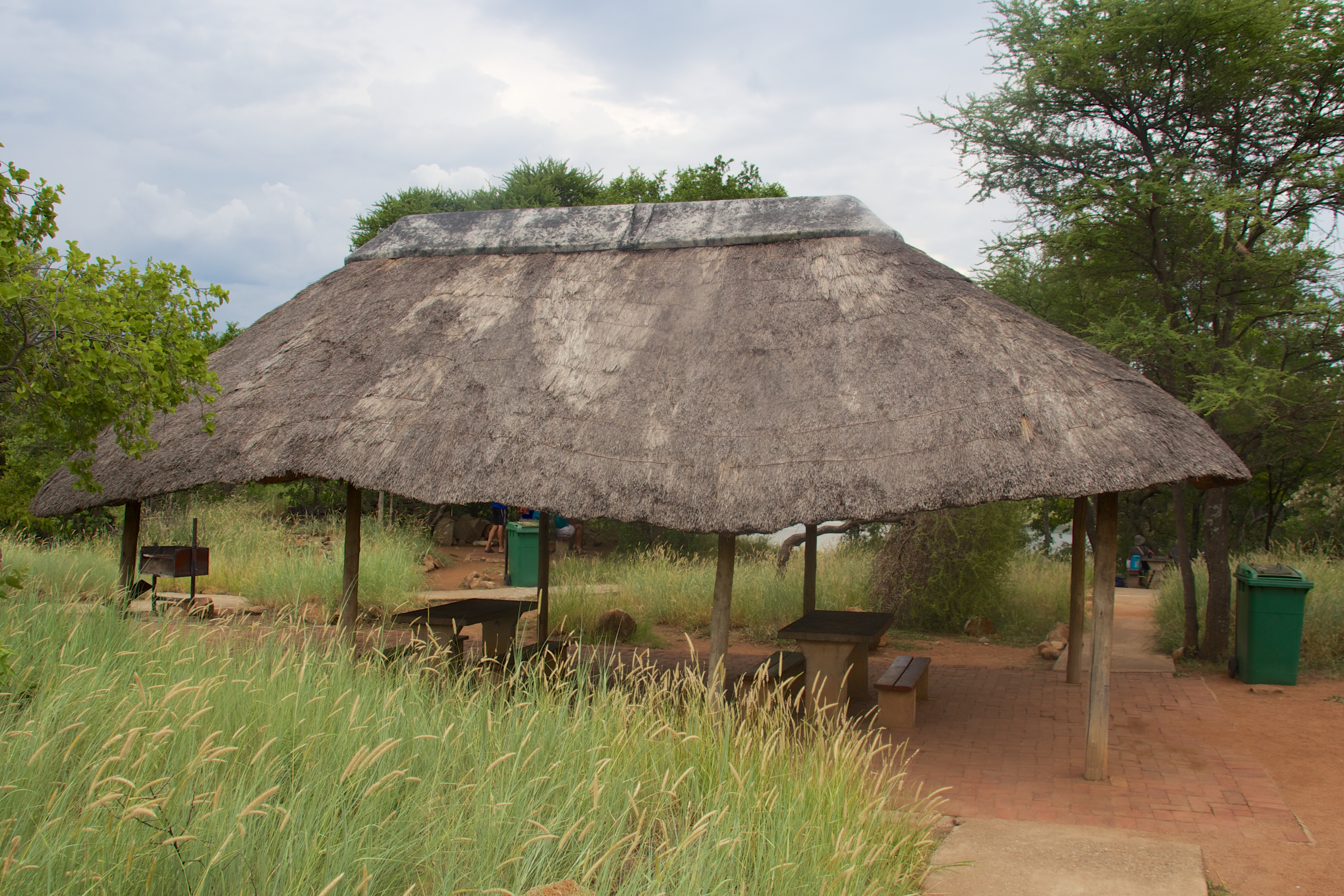
A lapa at a braai and picnic area in Pilanesberg Game Reserve, South Africa

A Lapa is a popular structure in Southern Africa. The word Lapa comes from Sotho and Tswana and means ‘home’. There are two ways of pronouncing the word; one is Lapa, and the other is Lelapa. Lapa and Lelapa are interchangeable. The word Lapa can be translated into English as 'yard' (referring to both the house and the land attached), or as 'family'.

== Usage ==
Culturally and linguistically, a Lapa has several meanings. It denotes a family, the land on which it lives, and the area directly in front of the house as one steps out of the door. The Lapa area is usually painted with traditional colors and decorated with plants and spiritually significant flowers. In many cases, a shrine to the ancestors is set up at one of the area's corners. Traditionally, the family gathers at the Lapa for meals and to host guests. During important family events, the family gathers at the Lapa to commune with the family's most significant ancestors and to pour libations of traditional morula wine and Mabele beer to them.

== Structure ==
The Lapa usually has a high thatched roof supported by wooden poles. The Lapa may be attached to the main house or be a separate structure a few meters. Traditionally, there can be more than one Lapa. In some homes, there are Lapas for the elders and separate lapas for younger relatives. During weddings and other celebrations, temporary lapas may be constructed to cater for the extra guests. Some may be used as kitchen areas or dining halls for event cooking and dining. The construction reflects ancient architectural skills.

== Contemporary use ==
Lapas have become a significant part of South Africa's modern architecture, and are now included in urban developments. Lapas have also become common at lodges and guest houses. They are used as entertainment areas for braais (barbecues), house parties and children's parties.

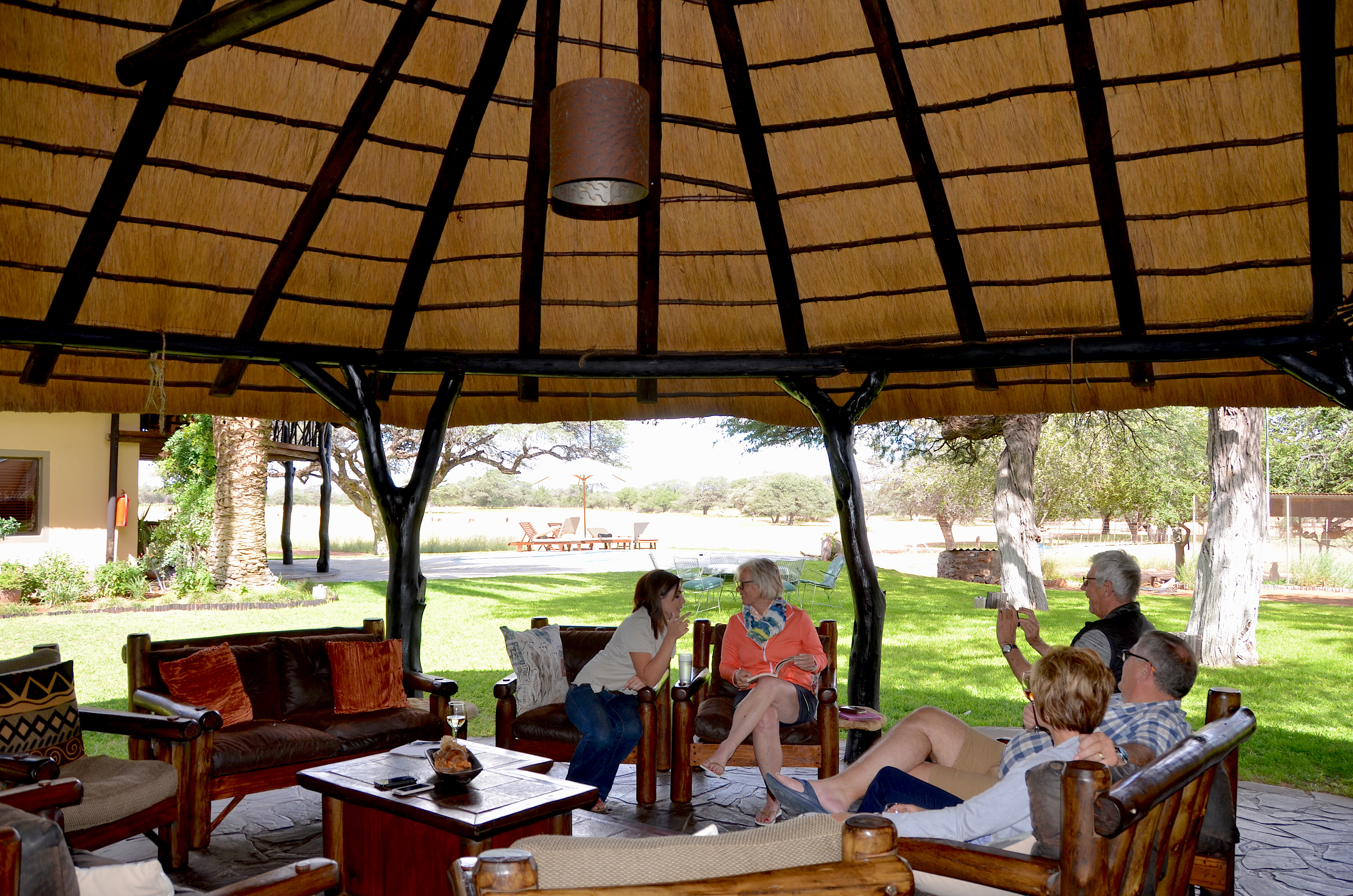
Inside of a lapa in Namibia

== See also ==
- Tswana
- Sotho
- South Africa
