= Vili language =

Bantu language spoken in Central Africa

Vili
- Civili
- Native to: Republic of the Congo, Gabon
- Native speakers: (100,000 cited 2000)
- Language family: Niger–Congo?: Atlantic–Congo; Benue–Congo; Bantoid; Bantu (Zone H); Kongo (Kikongo, H.10); Vili

Language codes
- ISO 639-3: vif
- Glottolog: vili1238
- Guthrie code: H.12

Vili (Civili, Tshivili) is one of the Zone H Bantu languages, grouped with the Kongo clade.

The language has a few thousand native speakers along the coast between southern Gabon and northern Cabinda, most of them in the Republic of the Congo's Kouilou, Pointe-Noire and Niari departments. The Vili people (singular Muvili, plural Bavili) were the population of the 17th- to 18th-century Kingdom of Loango in the same region.

== Phonology ==
=== Consonants ===
		Labial	Alveolar	Post-alv./ Palatal	Velar
Nasal		m	n	ɲ	
Plosive/ Affricate	voiceless	p	t	t͡ʃ	k
Plosive/ Affricate	voiced	b	d	d͡ʒ	ɡ
Plosive/ Affricate	prenasal vl.	ᵐp	ⁿt	ᶮt͡ʃ	ᵑk
Plosive/ Affricate	prenasal vd.	ᵐb	ⁿd	ᶮd͡ʒ	ᵑɡ
Fricative	voiceless	f	s		
Fricative	voiced	v	z		
Fricative	prenasal vl.	ᶬf	ⁿs		
Fricative	prenasal vd.	ᶬv	ⁿz		
Rhotic			r		
Approximant		w	l	j	

Consonants may also be labialized [ʷ] when preceding /w/.

=== Vowels ===
	Front	Central	Back
Close	i iː		u uː
Close-mid	e eː	ə	o oː
Open-mid	ɛ ɛː	ə	ɔ ɔː
Open		a aː	
