= List of festivals in Nigeria =

Festivals in Nigeria

Festivals in Nigeria reflect Nigeria's ethnic and cultural diversity with some traditions dating back to periods before the arrival of major religions. The Christian festivals and Islamic festivals are often celebrated in ways that are unique to Nigeria or unique to the people of a locality. The Nigerian Tourism Development Corporation works with state governments to promote traditional festivals, highlighting their potential as sources of tourism revenue. There are more than 365 festivals in Nigeria, according to the former Minister of Information and Culture, Lai Mohammed. The Nigerian Government is working to convert these festivals into a way of showcasing and boosting the country's diverse cultural output.

== List of festivals in Nigeria ==
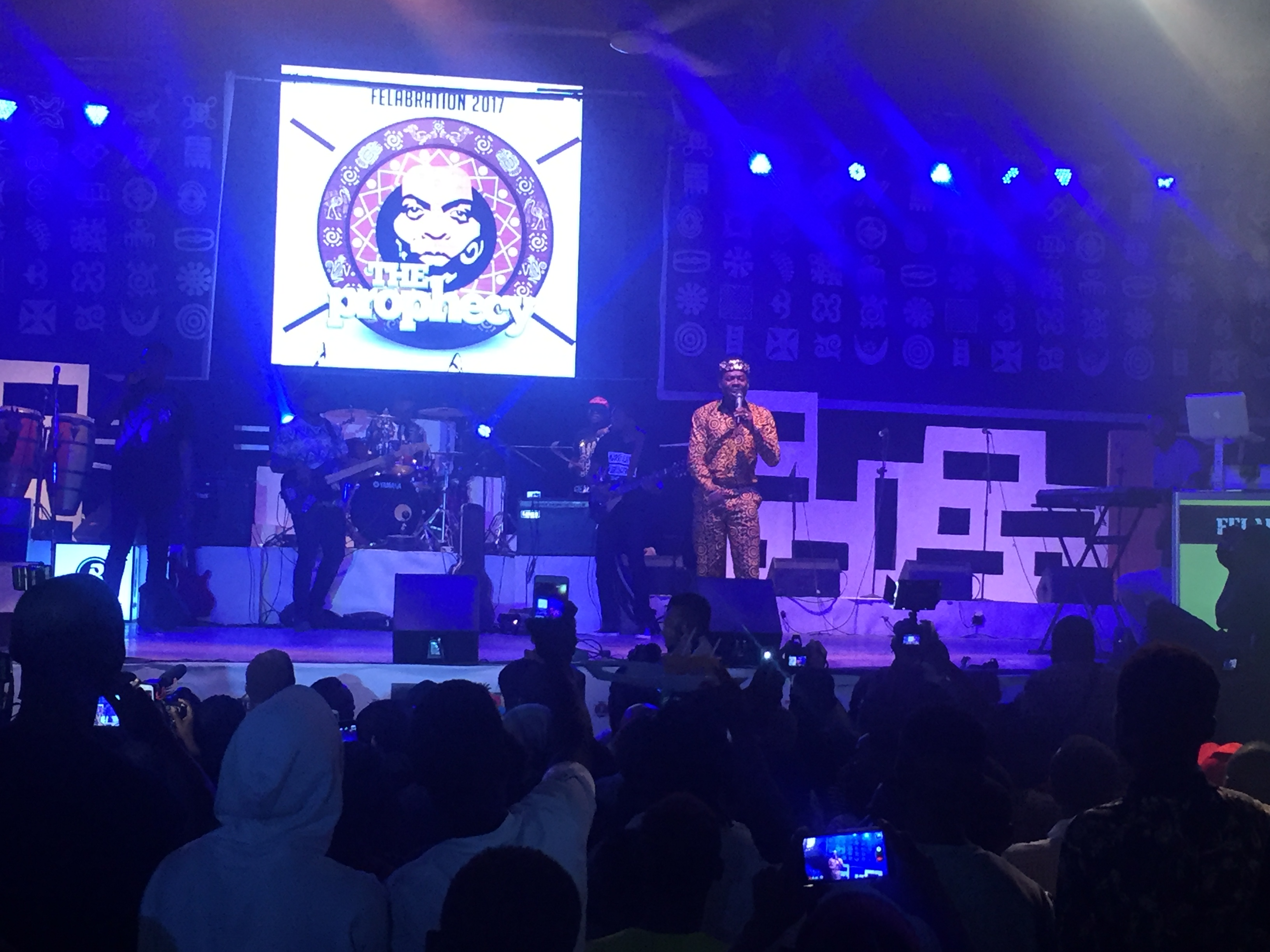
Adekunle Gold Performing at Felabration

=== Book festivals ===
- Port Harcourt Book Festival
- Lagos Book and Art Festival (LABAF)
- Kaduna Book And Art Festival (KABAFEST)
- Aké Arts and Book Festival
- Nigeria International Book Fair (NIBF)
- Chinua Achebe Literary Festival

=== Film festivals in Nigeria ===
- Abuja International Film Festival
- Africa International Film Festival (film)
- Eko International Film Festival (film)
- Kaduna International Film Festival (film)
- African Smartphone International Film Festival (film)
- Lights, Camera, Africa!
- Village Arts & Film Festival (VILLAFFEST)

=== Music festivals in Nigeria ===
- Baràà Ma Jalàm Festival
- Calabar Carnival
- Carniriv
- Felabration
- Gidi Culture Festival
- Kamti Festival
- Star Mega Jam
- Nupe Day Festival
- Rhythm Unplugged
- Lagos International Jazz Festival (LIJF)
- Livespot X Festival
- NATIONS RHYTHM FESTIVAL, Nigeria
- Mainland BlockParty

=== Art Festivals In Nigeria ===
- Life In My City Art Festival
- Things Fall Apart Festival

=== Cultural festivals in Nigeria ===
- Amaseikumor Festival
- Omabe Festival
- Afan National Festival
- The Afro Street Festival
- Njuwa Fishing Festival
- Nwonyo Fishing Festival
- Ikeji Arondizuogu Festival
- Agila Social and Economic Carnival
- Akata Benue Fishing Festival
- Annang Festival of Art and Culture
- Argungu Fishing Festival
- Ovia-Osese Festival
- Ayet Atyap annual cultural festival
- Ariginya Festival
- Aworoko Festival
- Badagry Festival
- Bala Baràà ma Jalàm cultural festival
- Bauchi State Festival of Arts and Culture
- Carniriv Festival
- Durbar festival
- Osun-Osogbo Festival
- Eyo festival
- Egwu Ogba
- FESTAC 77
- Golibe Festival
- Kaiama Gani Festival
- Gidi Culture Festival
- Igogo Festival
- Igue Festival
- Imo Carnival
- Sharo Festival
- Imo Awka festival
- Ikeji Arondizuogu
- Ijakadi Festival, common to the people of Offa town
- Iromo Festival in Igede Ekiti
- King Koko Festival
- Lagos Black Heritage Festival
- Leboku
- Machina Annual Cultural Festival (MACUF)
- Nibo Carnival
- Nchaka Festival
- Nollywood Cultural Heritage Festival
- Nupe Day Festival
- Kayo-Kayo Festival
- Opu Nembe Festival
- Opobo Nwaotam Festival
- Ofala Festival
- Ogwashi Ukwu Carnival
- Ojude Oba festival
- Olojo Festival
- Oro Festival
- Lagos Carnival
- Unyeada fishing festival
- Osori Osos
- Oronna Festival
- Sango Festival
- Songs of Nigeria Festival (SONIFES)
- Yam Festival
- New Yam Festivals in Nigeria
- Ocho Festival
- Ogani Festival Common to the Igala people of Kogi state, specifically those from the Ankpa axis
- Ito Ogbo festival
- Mmanwu Festival
- Ijele Festival
- Mbà Boli Festival Mambilla, Taraba State, Nigeria. Celebrated annually in November and serially across the Mambilla Plateau. It marks the completion of the maize harvest (kuum-ngwuoni) and Thanksgiving.
- Mbà Katii Festival, Mambilla, Taraba State, Nigeria. This is celebrated in December and goes around the Mambilla Plateau. All Mambilla Cultural festivals are serial festivals that move from one village to another on the minor Sabbath of the next village in the series.

=== Other ===
- Lagos Games Festival (LGF)
- Lagos Photo Festival
- Mr Hobby Appreciation Festival
- Potiskum Writers Association Schools Festival (POWASFEST)
- Tiger Street Food Festival
- Bole Festival

== Book festivals ==
=== Port Harcourt Book Festival ===
The Port Harcourt Book Festival is an annual literary event in Port Harcourt, Rivers State, organized by the Rainbow Book Club and endorsed by the Rivers State Government since 2008. The Garden City Literary Festival, which is currently known as the Port Harcourt Book Festival, was founded by Governor Amaechi of Rivers State, Hundreds of literary fans flock to the Garden City every year for this six-day event, which includes a book fair, writers' workshops, and a variety of other activities. In the past, the Festival has been attended by renowned authors and hosted celebrities.

Koko Kalango founded the festival as an initiative to increase tourism numbers and heighten literacy awareness in the city of Port Harcourt and its neighboring areas. Originally scheduled for 8 September each year, to coincide with United Nations' International Literacy Day, the festival has continued to expand and has been highly rated since its debut.

=== Lagos Book and Art Festival (LABAF) ===
The Lagos Book and Art Festival (LABAF) is an annual arts festival founded in 1999 by the Committee for Relevant Art (CORA), a Nigeria-based cultural organization. LABAF features pre-festival activities, including book treks, musical performances, book readings, film screenings, a publishers’ forum, book and art exhibitions, panel discussions, colloquia, symposia, book presentations, cultural exhibitions, book reviews, a green festival, and other events. The festival also encourages participation by students in primary and secondary schools and universities in Nigeria by introducing competitions and mentoring opportunities. LABAF selects different books yearly that are featured as Books of the Festival and form part of the festival's discourse for that year.

=== Kaduna Book And Art Festival (KABAFEST) ===
The Kaduna Book and Arts Festival (KABAFEST) is an annual literary, cultural, and art event in Kaduna State, that took place for the first time in July, 2017. It was organized by Book Buzz Foundation, which also organizes the annual Aké Arts and Book Festival, in collaboration with the Kaduna State Government and the Gusau Institute. It was also the first annual book festival in northern Nigeria. There is a perception about Northern Nigeria as a place that is too conservative for books and literature. KABAFEST was conceived - an initiative of the Kaduna State Government, as a way to address that misconception. Of that founding, Lola Shoneyin of Book Buzz says through the festival, she "aim[s] to create new and exciting opportunities for social and cultural interaction, the celebration and promotion of creatives in the Northern region of Nigeria and foster tolerance and understanding through dialogues about books, culture, the arts and society".

=== Aké Arts and Book Festival ===
The Aké Arts and Book Festival is an annual literary, cultural, and arts event founded in 2013 by the Nigerian writer Lola Shoneyin, taking place in Abeokuta. Although it has featured new and established writers from across the world, its focus has been on promoting, developing, and celebrating creativity on the African continent across diverse genres. In 2018, the festival was held for the first time in Lagos, from October 24 to October 27, with the theme being "Fantastical Futures". The Aké Arts and Book Festival has been described as the African continent's biggest annual gathering of literary writers, editors, critics, and readers. Shoneyin started the festival because, she said, she "wanted a place where intellectuals and thinkers can come together and talk about African issues on African soil." The festival is named after Aké, a town in Abeokuta, Ogun State, where Africa's first Nobel Laureate in Literature, Wole Soyinka, was born in 1934.

=== Nigeria International Book Fair ===
The Nigeria International Book Fair (NIBF) is an annual cultural event. It is known as the most-attended book fair in Africa, the only international book fair in Nigeria, and the second-largest international book fair in Africa. NIBF brings together book enthusiasts, including writers and poets, who are involved in the creation of print, audio, and digital books across the country at its annual fair.

The main aim of the festival is to promote and improve the reading culture among Nigerians and Africans as a whole. Every second week of May annually, the NIBF hosts publishers, booksellers, illustrators, authors, exhibitors, and readers who display and sell their books at discounted prices.

The Nigeria International Book Fair was inaugurated in 2001. The chairman of the event is also known to be the chairman of Nigerian Book Fair Trust, who currently is Gbadega Adedapo.

== Film festivals ==
=== Africa International Film Festival ===
The Africa International Film Festival (AFRIFF) is an annual film festival. It was founded in 2010 with its Inaugural edition in Port Harcourt, Rivers State. AFRIFF was founded by Chioma Ude, a passionate film buff and entrepreneur. The event spans a week, and it includes award shows and film training classes. Keith Shiri, the founder/director of Africa at the Pictures is the artistic director of the festival. AFRIFF gives out honors in categories such as Feature, Documentary, Short, Animation, and Student Short, as well as awards and prizes for Directing, Acting, and Screenplay. There are additional special awards for Audience Choice and an Outstanding Film Jury Award.

=== Eko International Film Festival ===
The annual Eko International Film Festival (EKOIFF) is an international film festival held in Lagos State. The Eko International Film Festival was founded and established in 2009 by Hope Obioma Opara, the CEO of Supple Communications Limited, under which the festival is held. He is also the publisher of Supple magazine, an African cinema and culture journal that features film previews, reviews, and interviews. The purpose of the Eko International Film Festival is to develop tourism in Nigeria by promoting appreciation of the arts and culture through the motion picture arts and sciences.

=== Lights, Camera, Africa! ===
Lights, Camera, Africa! is a film festival which has been held annually in Lagos since 2011. Ugoma Adegoke established the festival. Hosted by The Life House, the inaugural Lights, Camera, Africa! was supported by New York's African Film Festival, Inc. and ran for three days, from September 30 to October 2, 2011.

== Music festivals ==
=== Felabration ===
Felabration is an annual music festival conceived in 1998 by Yeni Anikulapo-Kuti in memory and celebration of her father Fela Kuti, a Nigerian musician and human rights activist known for pioneering the afrobeat genre of music. The one-week-long event which is held annually at the New Afrika Shrine in Ikeja, attracts visitors from different countries and has thus been considered as an official tourist destination by the Lagos State Government.

Felabration is held on the week of Fela Kuti's birthday. The event features musical performances by top acts from Nigeria and guest appearances by internationally acclaimed musicians and personalities. It also consists of street parades, symposia on social and topical issues, debates and photo exhibitions. The festival had performances from Star acts like Third World: an international reggae group, 2face, Femi Kuti, Ice Prince and a surprise performance by Majek Fashek.

=== Lagos International Jazz Festival ===
The Lagos International Jazz Festival (LIJF), also known as Lagos Jazz Fest, is an annual celebration of jazz music and culture that was founded by Ayoola Shadare of Inspiro Productions and takes place in Lagos.

This music festival is a three-day event. The 2016 edition was divided into a two-day standard edition which was held at the Freedom Park, Lagos and then a 0ne day luxury edition which took place at The Bay Lounge Waterfront.

=== Rhythm Unplugged ===
Rhythm Unplugged is a music concert in West Africa. CEO of the Flytime Group, Cecil Hammond, organised the first concert in 2004. The annual concert is organized by Flytime Promotions, a subsidiary of the Flytime Group. The 2011 Lagos edition of Rhythm Unplugged unveiled artists including Wizkid, Olamide, Davido, Tiwa Savage and Seyi Shay.

Rhythm Unplugged concerts featured dialogue co-hosts, notably, co-hosts Julius Agwu and Okey Bakassi, who hosted several Flytime Promotions events in the early years. Rhythm Unplugged also pioneered an extensive artist line-up for single-concert events in Nigeria. Rhythm Unplugged was first organized by Cecil Hammond in 2004 via his company Flytime Promotions. The entertainment event was designed to promote Nigerian musicians and comedians at a time when the Nigerian music industry was gaining recognition on the international music scene.

=== Nupe Cultural Day ===
The Nupe Day Celebration is a traditional cultural event on June 26. The event is ordinarily celebrated by the Nupe community yearly in the country. The Nupe day event is a traditional and festival celebration, which marks the day when a native African Army defeated the British Army on June 26, 1896, when the British Protectorate in Lokoja approached the Bida Military camp at Ogidi of present Kogi State which bring the resulting of the defeated of British Constabulary and the Union Jack was seized by the Nupe Cavalry. The annual celebration was the founding idea of the Nupe elders throughout the tribes. Unlike the Durbar festival and the Pategi Regatta Festival, which are also among Nupe events and traditional events in Northern Nigeria.

=== Star Mega Jam ===
The Star Mega Jam was a series of music concerts held annually from 2000 to 2010. Each year it was held in Lagos and Abuja. Acts that played included Awilo Logomba, Shaggy, Usher, Koffi Olumide, 50 Cent, Ja Rule and Kevin Lyttle, LL Cool J and Akon, Kanye West, T-Pain, Nelly, Nas, Busta Rhymes and Ludacris. Thus festival however was stopped in 2011, with the organisers stating that it was due to logistical challenges.

=== Gidi Culture Festival ===
The Gidi Culture Festival (often dubbed "Coachella in Lagos") is an annual one-day music and arts festival held in Lagos. Co-founded by Chinedu Okeke and Oriteme Banigo, it was created in response to a demand from the local youth culture for live, affordable, and accessible entertainment in Africa. The festival provides a venue for live bands, DJs, and musical acts to perform. It also features outdoor activities, local vendors, and artisans. The main show features a line-up of African acts from numerous countries, including Nigeria, Ghana, South Africa, Congo, Kenya, and the United Kingdom. The goal of the festival is to encourage the development of African talent and promote artists both within the continent and into overseas markets.

=== Livespot X Festival ===
Livespot X Festival is an annual music concert that launched in 2019 with its maiden edition in Lagos, Nigeria, and Accra, Ghana. The concert is organized by Livespot 360 owned by Deola Art Alade. The 2019 edition of Livespot X Festival unveiled artists including Cardi B, Teni, Burna Boy, Tiwa Savage, Seyi Shay, Joeboy, Ice Prince, DJ Cuppy, Reekado Banks, and Patoranking which was held in Lagos and Ghana.

== Life In My City Festival ==
The Life In My City Art Festival (LIMCAF) is an annual celebration that highlights the creative talents of Nigeria's emerging young artists. It was founded in 2007 by Chief Robert Orji. LIMCAF was formally registered as a trusteeship under the Life In My City Art Initiative in 2012. This festival showcases the artistic works of young Nigerian artists, including painters, textile artists, sculptors, graphic designers, and photographers. Through different themes, LIMCAF promotes artistry, innovation, environmental awareness, and social commentary.

The festival provides a platform for young people to express their thoughts on Nigeria's lived environment through art. It also empowers young artists by promoting and commercializing their works nationally and internationally.

A panel of judges carefully selects the best artworks from over 600 entries, showcased across 11 regional exhibition centers in Nigeria. The selected artworks are then featured in the grand finale, held annually in October at the International Conference Center, IMT, Enugu. Winners are celebrated and recognized during this event.

== Christian festivals ==
Christians account for roughly 50% of Nigeria's population and are found throughout the country, though they are concentrated in the south. The principal Christian festivals are Christmas and Easter. Their observance frequently incorporates elements drawn from pre-Christian folklore.

Christmas is observed on December 25 to mark the birth of Jesus Christ. It is recognized as a public holiday in Nigeria. In Igboland, celebrations often extend beyond church services and gift-giving to include Mmo (masquerade) dancing, in which men in their twenties or thirties wear elaborate costumes and masks—practices that predate Christianity and are associated with honoring ancestral spirits. In some areas, palm branches are displayed in and around homes as symbols of peace and as markers of the Christmas season. Easter commemorates the crucifixion of Jesus Christ on Good Friday and the belief in his resurrection three days later on Easter Sunday. It is also a public holiday in Nigeria. Easter typically falls in April. Easter Sunday is treated as a celebratory occasion, often marked by feasting, dancing, drumming, and, in some cases, public masquerades and performances. In many communities, a period of fasting known as Lent precedes the celebration, although adherence varies across denominations.

In some regions, these holidays coincide with periods of heightened tension between Christians and Muslims. On Christmas Eve in 2010, at least 38 people—including shoppers and church attendees—were killed in attacks attributed to the extremist group Boko Haram. Some reports placed the death toll as high as 80. In 2011, Easter occurred shortly after national elections in which Goodluck Jonathan, a southern Christian, was elected president. In the aftermath, churches were burned in parts of northern Nigeria, and some Christians were killed in post-election violence.

== Muslim festivals ==
Roughly half of Nigeria's population identifies as Muslim, with adherents distributed nationwide but concentrated in the north. Estimates place 39% of the population as Christian, 50% as Muslim, and 11% as adhering to other religions. The two principal Muslim festivals are Eid al-Fitr and Eid al-Adha, both recognized as national public holidays. These festivals are observed in broadly similar ways across the country.

The three-day festival of Eid al-Fitr marks the end of Ramadan, a month defined by fasting from dawn to dusk. The festival emphasizes charity toward people experiencing poverty and provides an occasion for communal celebration with family and friends.

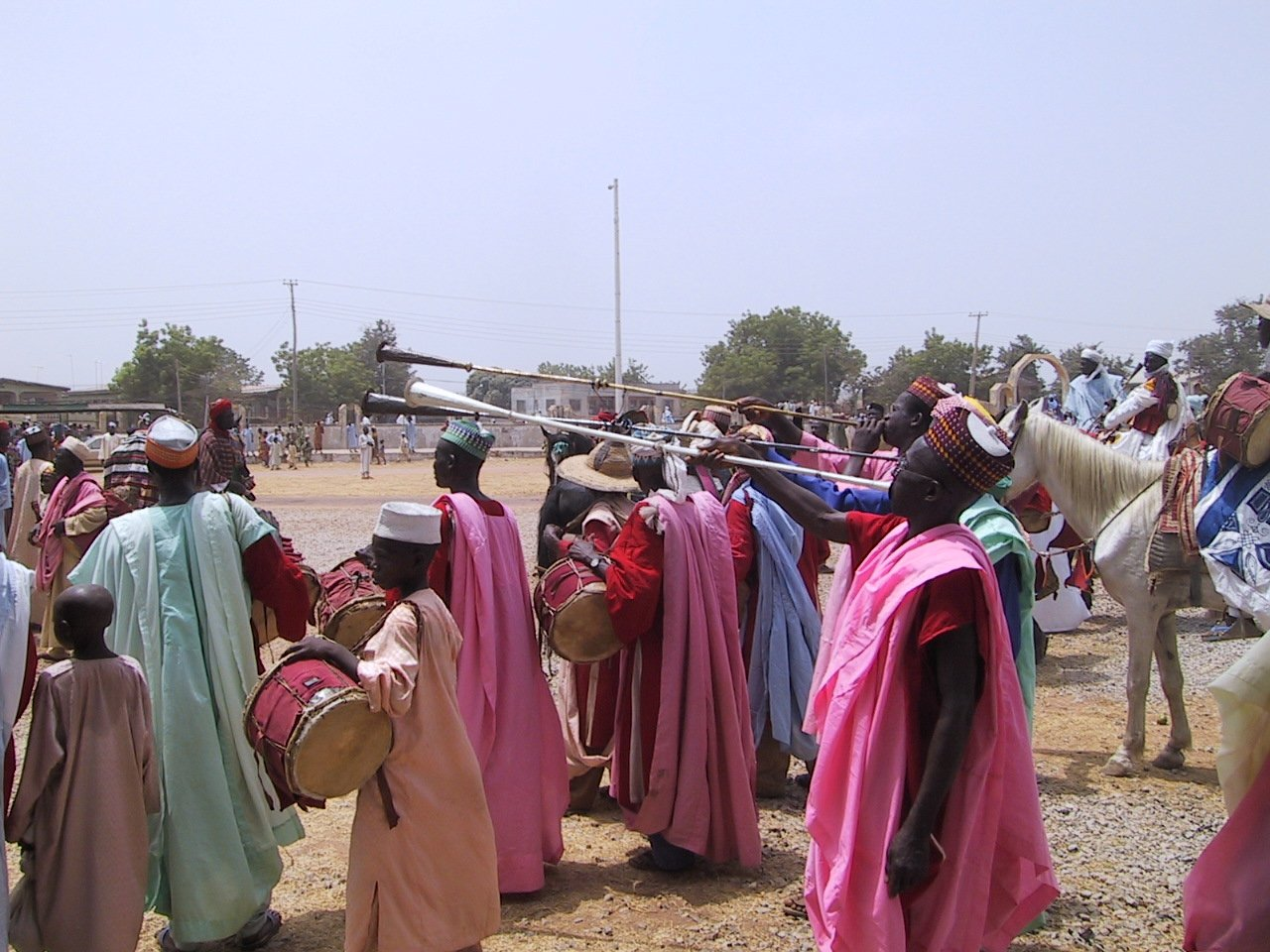
Bida Emirate durbar festival, 2001

Eid al-Adha, or the "Feast of the Sacrifice", commemorates the story in which Abraham (ʾIbrāhīm) is said to have been willing to sacrifice his son Ishmael (Ismā'īl) as an act of obedience to God. In practice, an animal—commonly a ram, goat, sheep, cow, or camel—is slaughtered, with part consumed by the family and the remainder distributed to people experiencing poverty. The festival takes place on the tenth day of Dhu al-Hijjah, the final month of the Islamic calendar.

Durbar festivals are held in conjunction with Eid al-Fitr and Eid al-Adha. These events have historical roots in northern emirates, notably the Daura Emirate, where they functioned in part as displays of military readiness, allowing mounted participants to demonstrate horsemanship and discipline. In contemporary settings, durbars are staged for ceremonial purposes, often in honor of visiting dignitaries, and include parades, performances, and competitions. Participants wear vividly colored attire and carry traditional weapons, accompanied by drummers and musicians. Modern durbars typically begin with prayers, followed by organized displays in public squares or near an emir's residence. Horsemanship remains central, with riders galloping at speed before halting to salute the emir. In recent years, durbar festivals have been promoted as tourist attractions. During the COVID-19 pandemic, some northern states suspended these gatherings due to the public health risks posed by large crowds and limited adherence to safety protocols.

=== Kayo-Kayo Festival ===
The Kayo-Kayo festival is a yearly religious and cultural state event held by the descendants of Oba Kosoko to commemorate King Kosoko's historic landing in Epe in 1851. The Epe community of Lagos State is known for Kayo-Kayo, which literally means "eating to satisfaction." The festival is commemorated on the 10th day of Muharram in the Islamic calendar, which is about a month after the Muslim celebration of Eid al-Adha; it is normally held in the first month of the Islamic calendar.

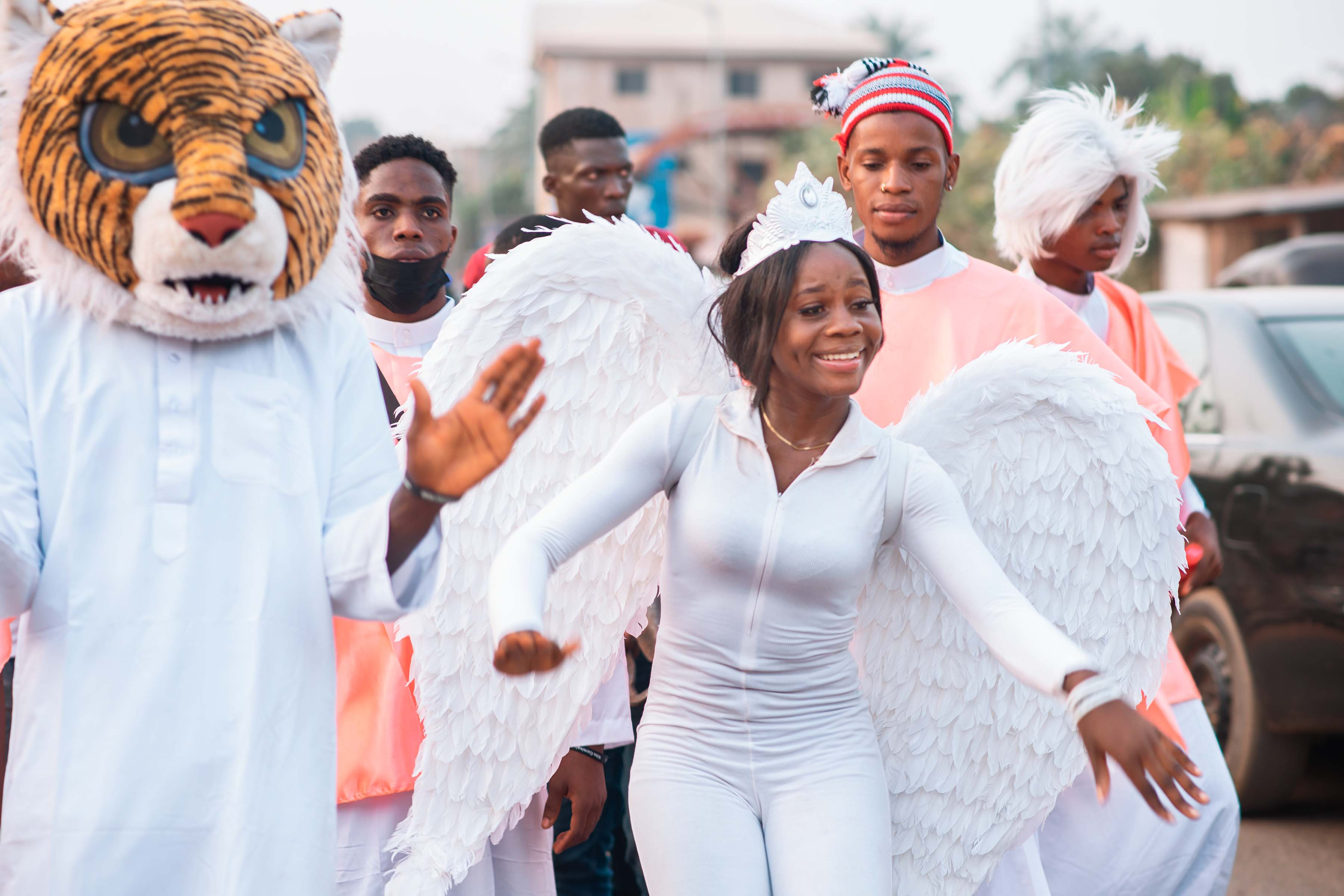
2021 Parade

== Other Important festivals ==
=== Afan National Festival ===
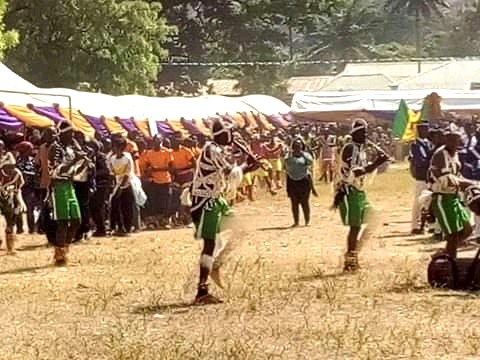
Sights of the Afan National Festival, 2020 edition: Afizere (Jarawa) dancers from Toro LGA, Bauchi State.

The Afan National Festival is annually held in the town of Kagoro in the southern part of Kaduna State on January 1 at the Chief of Kagoro's palace field with many cultural displays by troops from within the township, its vicinity, and across the Middle Belt of the country. It is said to have been active for over 400 years. The festival is always held as a celebration of the bravery and gallantry of a hunter named Katagwan who was said to be known for his great hunting skills and exploits.

=== Argungu Fishing Festival ===
The Argungu Fishing Festival is an annual four-day festival in the town of Argungu in the north-western Nigerian state of Kebbi. It began in 1934, marking the end of the centuries-old hostility between the Sokoto Caliphate and the Kebbi Kingdom. The festival is held on the Sokoto River in February or March. Thousands of fishermen equipped only with nets compete to catch the largest fish. Other attractions include dance and music, sporting competitions, and arts-and-crafts exhibits. People from various parts of the world come to see this festival. The festival is believed to have started after the historic peace visit by the then 16th Sultan of Sokoto, Alhaji Hassan Dan Mu'azu. It is believed that the Sultan's prayers during his visit, after he was served a large fish, made the waters of Argungu fertile and special, leading to the yearly commemoration of his visit.

=== Ikeji Arondizuogu ===
The Ikeji cultural festival in Arondizuogu, Imo State, is a widely attended event that brings together Igbo-speaking communities from Nigeria and the diaspora. Its origins are said to extend back more than five centuries, and it is often described as the largest pan-Igbo cultural festival. It draws thousands of attendees each year and is frequently characterized as one of the most prominent festivals in Igboland. In recent decades, the scale of performances, displays, and participation has expanded, reflecting both modernization and the incentives created by tourism and social visibility. The festival features elaborate masquerade performances—including Ogionu, Mgbadike, Nwaaburuja, and Ozoebune—that parade through public spaces and are widely appreciated as cultural spectacles. Its central theme is the celebration of the first yam harvest. It also serves to reinforce social ties among Aro communities dispersed across Igbo-speaking regions and into parts of Cross River State.

Ikeji is a four-day festival involving rituals of propitiation, thanksgiving, and feasting, held annually in March or April. According to the traditional Igbo calendar, these four days correspond to a full market week (Eke, Oye/Orie, Afo, and Nkwo). Each day holds symbolic significance within the festival's structure, which is known for large communal meals, performances, and music. Masquerades are accompanied by instruments such as the ekwe (wooden slit drum), ogene (metal gong), bells, maracas, and the oja (wooden flute). The flutist plays a central role, coordinating performances and signaling transitions. An additional feature is the raconteur known as ima mbem, who delivers stylized narratives that may be difficult for outsiders to interpret. The flutist's role is considered essential within the performance, shaping the rhythm and signaling cues that guide the masquerades' movements in ways that appear opaque to non-initiates.

On the final day of the festival, a ram is tied to a pole in a central market square. Participants attempt to reach and untie the ram while others symbolically attempt to obstruct them. Participation is limited to those willing to enter the contest, while others observe as spectators. Individuals take turns approaching the ram, advancing through the crowd in a highly ritualized performance. Others replace those who withdraw until a participant succeeds in untying the ram. The successful individual is celebrated publicly, receiving recognition and social prestige. This recognition is reinforced by visits from relatives bearing food and drink, thereby elevating both the individual's and their community's status. The event is commonly interpreted as demonstrating the relative strength of a participant's spiritual protection.

=== Calabar Carnival ===
The Calabar Carnival has been held in Calabar since 2006, including band competitions, a parade, food, and dancing. It has been called Nigeria's biggest street party. The carnival may have as many as 50,000 costumed participants and 2 million spectators, and is broadcast on television Stations across the country. It is the culmination of the month-long Calabar festival.

The Calabar Carnival is held at the end of the year, and, in keeping with tradition, carnival teams march through the streets, where they perform colorful displays and compete, with winners selected and awarded. Participating teams usually rehearse for months before the carnival date.

=== Carniriv ===
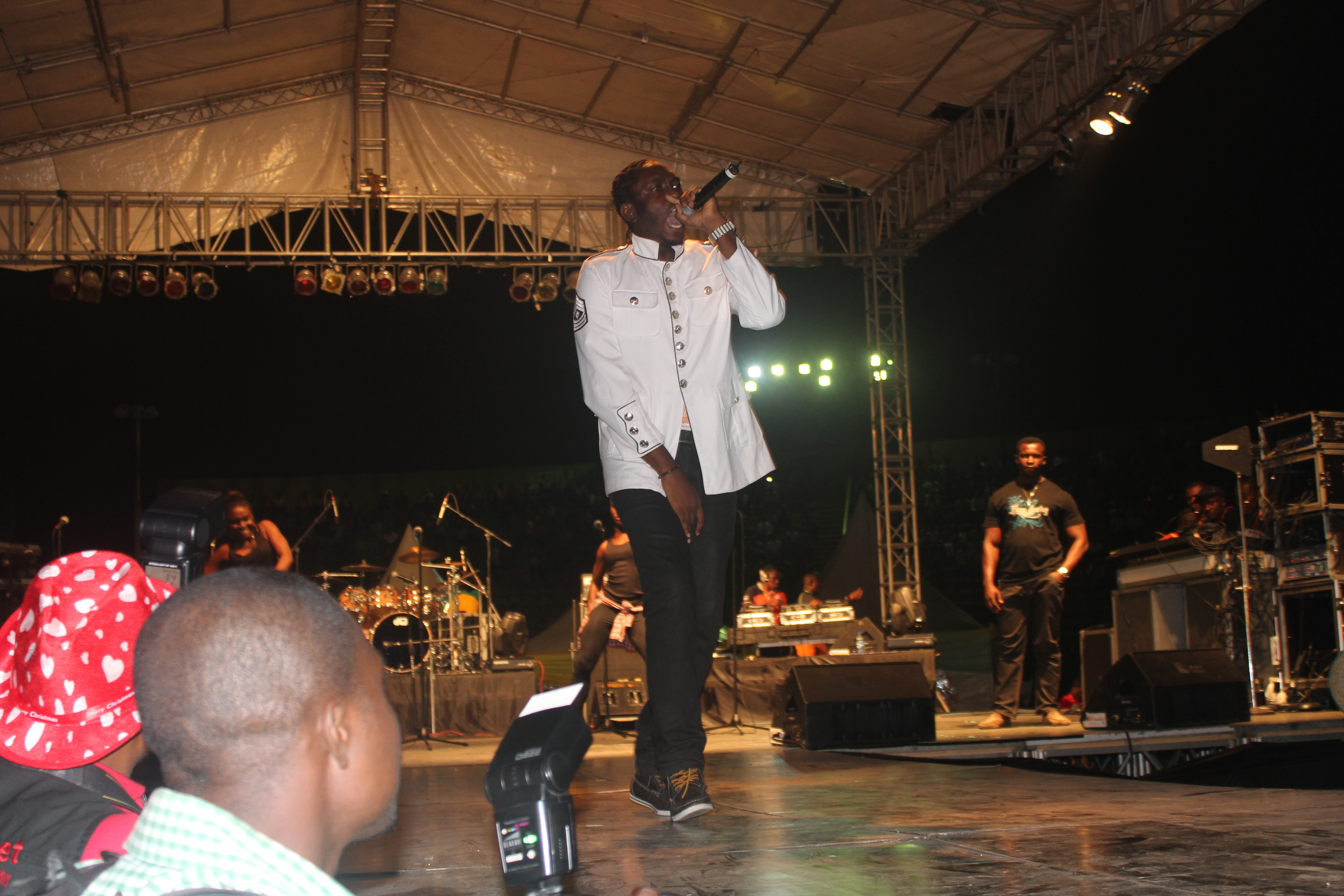
Young Stunna performing at Carniriv Opening Ceremony

The Carniriv (English: Car-nee-rev) is an annual festival, held in Port Harcourt. The Carnival starts few weeks before Christmas, and lasts for seven days. During this time, several ceremonial events are held, most of which have some cultural and/or sacred significance. The Port Harcourt Carnival bears a certain uniqueness as it combines two carnivals - a purely cultural carnival and a contemporary Caribbean style carnival- in one. This gives it an edge over all other regional and continental carnivals, and presents the principal advantage which must be consummately exploited. The Government of Rivers State recognizes Carniriv as its biggest tourism export. With economic interests increasingly recognizing tourism as a viable alternative to the fossil fuel economy–especially in these parts–the state government has demonstrated its commitment to developing this carnival into a regionally unrivaled and globally recognized tourist attraction. Thus, it has always made available the necessary monetary backing needed for the event to hold every year, and has also worked hard through the Ministry of Culture and Tourism to see that it is held.

=== Nibo Carnival ===
The Nibo Carnival commenced on March 27, 2016, and continued for four years, always coinciding with the Easter season during those years. However, a significant change took place in July 2019, during the annual Nibo Union Conventions held in Chicago, United States, when the event was rescheduled to December 23 to December 25. The adjustment was made to facilitate greater participation in the annual event by citizens of Nibo, especially those living abroad in the diaspora. The carnival kicks off on December 23 with a vibrant street parade featuring youths in colorful costumes, a tantalizing array of street food, and an evening music festival. Then, on the evening of December 24, carnival-goers gather for a "Tales by Moonlight" symposium that delves into the rich history of the Igbo people and emphasizes the significance of cultural heritage. This gathering also includes an indulgent all-you-can-eat buffet. The Ada Nibo beauty pageant competition marks the grand finale of the carnival, which aims to select the next female child ambassador. This ambassador is entrusted with the responsibility of carrying out various empowerment projects throughout the year until her tenure concludes.

=== Eyo festival ===
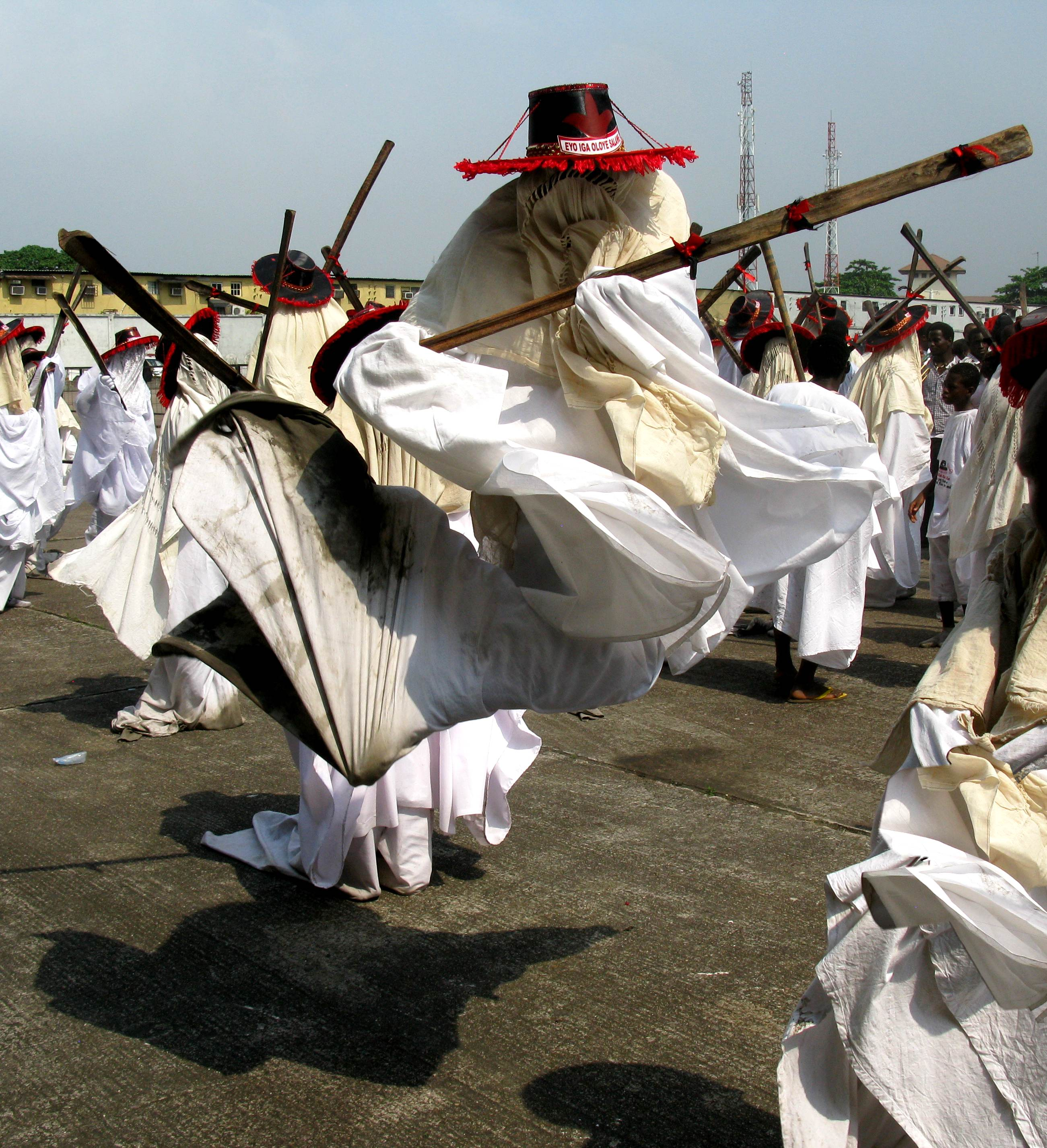
An Eyo Iga Olowe Salaye masquerade jumping

The Eyo Festival is held in Lagos. It is usually performed in Lagos Island. Eyo also refers to the masquerades that come out during the festival. It is widely believed that Eyo is the forerunner of the modern-day carnival in Brazil. No one is to wear hats during the festival

=== Olojo Festival ===
The Olojo Festival is an ancient event celebrated annually in Ife, Osun State. It is widely regarded as a prominent festival in Yorubaland, and has been described by Adeyeye Enitan Ogunwusi as a celebration of Black identity globally. The Yoruba term "Olojo", meaning "The Day of the First Dawn", conveys a symbolic expression of human gratitude for existence and creation. The festival occupies an established place in the cultural calendar of Ile-Ife, a city in southwestern Nigeria often regarded in Yoruba tradition as a place of origin. It commemorates Ogun, the deity associated with iron, who, in Yoruba mythology, is the first son of Oduduwa, the ancestral figure of the Yoruba people. The festival is held each year in October.

=== Igbo New Yam festival ===
The New Yam Festival of the Igbo people (Orureshi in the Idoma area, Iwa ji, Iri ji, or Ike ji, depending on dialect) is an annual cultural festival held at the end of the rainy season in early August.

=== Igogo Festival ===
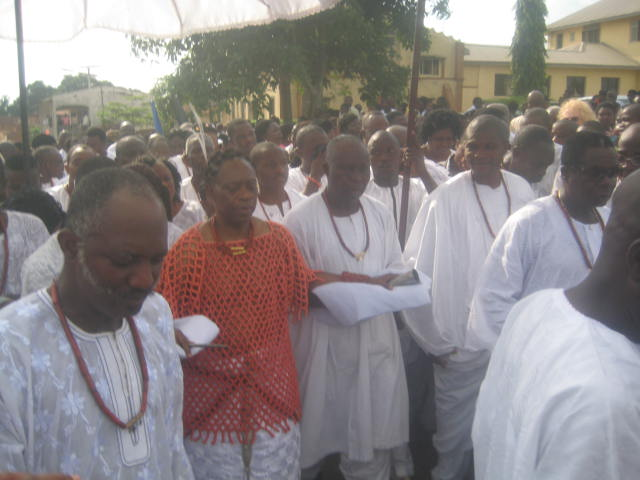
Portrait of Folagbade Olateru Olagbegi III, the incumbent Olowo of Owo during the 2013 Igogo festival

The Igogo Festival is an annual event held in Ondo State. It lasts approximately seventeen days, during which the Olowo of Owo and high chiefs of the Owo Kingdom dress in women's attire as part of a ritual performance intended to honor Queen Oronsen, a figure described in local tradition as the wife of Olowo Rerengejen.

=== Nnewi Afiaolu Festival ===
Afiaolu (New Yam Festival) is a traditional event held annually in Nnewi, Anambra State, typically around August. The festival begins on "Eke" day with activities referred to as "IWAJI" (the ritual presentation or "tasting" of new yam) and Ikpa Nku (wood gathering), marking the seasonal availability of new yam and expressing communal thanksgiving. The festival features various forms of entertainment, including ceremonial rites performed by the Igwe (king), cultural dances by girls, and masquerade performances.

=== Omabe Festival ===
The Omabe Festival is a traditional event observed in the Imufu community in the Nsukka region of Ezike, Enugu State, and is distinct from many Nigerian festivals in that it is held at five-year intervals rather than annually. It is regarded locally as an important cultural institution with long historical roots, often described as extending back several centuries. Within community narratives, the festival is said to symbolize purification and the removal of misfortune or "evil" from both the community's social and spiritual life. Participants in masquerade performances are understood within that framework as intermediaries between the physical and spiritual realms, with masquerades themselves interpreted by adherents as agents of cleansing when they appear, sometimes described in symbolic association with fire. The festival features numerous masquerade figures, including Eshiwe, Obele Monwu, Oshagenyi, Eji, Mgbedike, Mukwu Monwu, Ajulaka, Agbe-Eji, Ajija, and Agelle, among others. Community accounts sometimes estimate that there are hundreds of masquerade forms. In practice, access to masquerade performances is socially restricted, including prohibitions on women approaching certain masquerade activities.

=== Ofala Festival ===
The Ofala Festival, also called Ofala Nnewi, is an annual ceremony practiced by the indigenes of Onitsha in Anambra State. The term ofala (English: authority of the land) is derived from two Igbo words – ofo (English: authority) and ala (English: land). The festival which is described as the most important surviving traditional ceremony of Onitsha indigenes is celebrated within two days mostly in December and January in honour of the Obi (English: king). The Ofala festival, which means 'Authority of the land', can be traced back to the 16th century and is one of the most popular festivals in Igbo land. The king (Obi), during the festival, comes out three times to address the people and to perform a ritual which the chief priest leads. Some historians also believe the festival is associated with the New Yam Festival in Onitsha and the king's devotion to his people's safety.

=== Osun festival ===
Main Article: Osun festival

The Osun Festival is held at the end of the rainy season, typically in August, at the Osun-Osogbo, Osun State. It is a week-long event dedicated to Oshun, a Yoruba river deity, and draws thousands of participants and visitors each year. The festival includes ritual ceremonies conducted by priests who, within the framework of traditional belief, seek protection for their communities through offerings described as gifts and sacrifices to the deity. Practitioners also understand it as a symbolic cleansing of the city of Osogbo, a site recognized by UNESCO for its cultural significance, and attracts a large and diverse audience from different social backgrounds. A key ritual component of the festival is "Iwopopo", a ceremonial cleansing of the town.

=== Sango festival ===
The Sango Festival, also known as the World Sango Festival, is typically held in August at the palace of the Alaafin of Oyo in Oyo State. It is observed in multiple countries—reportedly over forty worldwide, and is dedicated to Shango, the Yoruba deity associated in tradition with thunder and fire.

The festival is often said to have origins extending back around 1,000 years, linked to narratives surrounding Sango as a prominent Yoruba Orisha and a foundational figure in the traditional account of the Oyo kingdom's origins.

The event, formally renamed in 2013, lasts approximately one week, takes place annually in August, and attracts more than 20,000 attendees from across the globe, including communities in Brazil, Cuba, Trinidad and Tobago and the wider Caribbean.

=== Sharo / Shadi Festival ===
The Sharo or Shadi flogging competition is a traditional rite of passage among Jafun Fulani men. In this practice, young men are escorted by women and led into a public arena, where they appear bare-chested and are subjected to flogging with whips in front of assembled spectators. Amid singing, drumming, and heightened crowd participation, each participant is expected to endure physical pain without visible distress. In some accounts, eligibility for marriage is tied to the successful completion of an ordeal administered by a peer of similar age and stature. While many participants are reported to complete the ordeal, it often results in lasting physical scars. Sharo is typically held during the dry-season guinea corn harvest and also coincides with the festival of Eid al-Adha. It generally lasts for about a week and is staged in marketplace settings. The event also includes dances, musical performances, and entertainment by tricksters, though flogging remains the festival's central and defining feature.

=== Yam Festivals ===
Yam festivals are widely observed seasonal celebrations, typically held at the beginning of August at the end of the rainy season, marking the harvest of yams, a major staple crop across many West African societies. They are named after the yam and function primarily as agricultural festivals tied to food security, seasonal cycles, and communal celebration. In some communities, dancers wear masks representing seasonal changes or natural forces. In certain accounts, yams are offered to deities and ancestors before being distributed among community members. Leboku is the name of the annual New Yam Festival celebrated in Ugep, one of the five settlements of the Yakurr people. The Iriji-Mmanwu festival takes place in Enugu state in August and features large-scale masquerade performances involving over two thousand participants from across Igboland and other parts of Nigeria. These masqueraders perform dances and acrobatic displays in elaborate and colorful costumes. Within Igbo tradition, masquerades are often interpreted as embodiments of ancestral spirits.

=== Ogun Festival ===
The Ogun Festival is an annual celebration observed by the Yoruba people of Ondo State, held in honor of Ogun, a figure described in tradition as a warrior spirit associated with metalwork and, in mythological accounts, one of the first deities to arrive on earth.

Preparations for the festival typically begin seventeen days in advance. The sighting of the new moon is formally announced by a chief priest using the "upe" (a local trumpet) over seven days. This lunar observation is treated as a necessary condition for the festival's commencement.

The festival intensifies over its final three days. On the first of these days, a dog is sacrificed as part of the central ritual. The animal is pulled in opposing directions by two participants, resulting in its prolonged suffering and death as part of the ceremonial process.

=== Ito Ogbo Festival ===
The Ito-Ogbo Obosi festival is a long-established cultural event, said to date back more than four centuries, and is specifically associated with the Obosi Kingdom in Anambra State. The festival is held every three years and recognizes individuals aged 80 and above in the community, regardless of gender.

Participants are formally honored and inducted into an age-grade category for octogenarians. In addition to its social function, the festival has increasingly been leveraged as a cultural tourism event, attracting visitors from diverse regions and contributing to the external visibility of the Obosi Kingdom.

=== Ariginya Festival ===
The Ariginya Festival is a cultural event celebrated in Ikare, a town in Ondo State, within the Yoruba cultural region. It is sometimes also referred to as Aringinya, depending on local pronunciation and dialect variation. The festival is described as one of the town's longstanding traditions, dating back to its origins. It is framed around the celebration and public valuation of female virginity and chastity, reflecting a social system in which sexual status is treated as a determinant of moral worth. The festival is further associated with promoting ideas of female "purity" and reserving sexual activity for marriage, reinforcing behavioral expectations tied to marital eligibility.

=== Tiger Street Food Festival ===
The Tiger Street Food Festival was developed out of the need to support the love of food, music, art and entrepreneurs in the street food business whilst celebrating the various flavours of the Tiger style through specially curated street food experiences over cold bottles of Tiger beer.

During the festival, food is abundant from various vendors. Also top Nigerian artists are invited to the festival to add entertainment to the atmosphere that is already filled with lots of street food and refreshments. And the art displays during the festivals are usually street art such as graffiti art.

=== Annang Festival of Arts and Culture ===
The Annage Festival of Art and Culture began in 2016, usually celebrated by the Ikot Ekpene people of Akwa Ibom State. They first edition was sponsored by Annang Heritage Preservation Inc. (AHPI). It is usually celebrated in the entire 8 local government area that make up Annang clan.

The festival was initiated in 2016 to preserve the Anaañ history, language, and culture. The festival aims to preserve the Annang tradition and cultural heritage from extinction. It showcases and promotes the rich natural endowments of Annang land in Akwa Ibom State. The 2019 edition of the Annang Festival of Arts and Culture was tagged: "Harnessing Annang Cultural Assets for Economic Gain".

=== Imo Awka Festival ===
The Imo Awka Festival is an annual cultural event celebrated in May in Awka, Anambra State. It is presented as a form of veneration of the Imoka deity, a religious construct through which the community expresses gratitude and petitions for favorable future conditions. The Imo-Oka shrine is regarded within local belief systems as symbolically significant, and white-bellied monkeys are traditionally treated as sacred animals associated with the shrine.

The festival is described as an ancient practice rooted in the worship of the Imoka deity, traditionally understood as a major male god within Awka folklore. The Imo Awka Festival spans approximately two weeks and begins with ritualized participation by women who perform homage to Imoka through the Opu Eke dance.

=== Ovia-Osese Festival ===
The Ovia-Osese Festival is an annual cultural event celebrated by the Ogori community in the Ogori-Magongo Local Government Area of Kogi State. The town lies near the boundary with Edo State and within a region influenced by the Yoruba culture.

At its core, the festival has functioned as an initiation rite for girls, typically beginning around age 15, marking their transition into what the community defines as adulthood. Eligibility has historically depended on whether a girl is judged to have preserved her virginity. The stated purpose of the rite is to promote "purity", "sanctity", and sexual restraint among young women. The festival is framed as encouraging discipline and deterring premarital relationships, doing so by linking a young woman's social recognition to her conformity with restrictive norms about sexuality and virginity. The festival has gained recognition beyond Nigeria as a notable expression of local heritage.

=== New Yam Festivals ===
Yam is a staple food in the West Africa and other regions, classified botanically as a tuber crop and it is cultivated as either an annual or perennial plant. It comprises multiple species within the genus Dioscorea. In Nigeria, yam has long been one of the most economically and culturally significant crops, grown across many states and serving as a marker of material wealth in traditional agrarian societies, where large yam barns historically signified higher social and economic status. It is also assigned cultural value beyond nutrition, in some communities being incorporated into marital transactions as part of bride price practices. Among the Igbo people, yam is central to seasonal festivals that mark the transition between harvest cycles. The New Yam Festival is held annually to mark the end of one agricultural cycle and the beginning of another, corresponding to the annual cultivation cycle of most yam varieties. ATraditional norms often prohibit consumption of new yam before the festival, a restriction framed as deference to ancestral or spiritual forces associated with fertility and harvest.

== Cities/Towns that celebrate New Yam Festival ==
- Igbo Community
- Okpe Kingdom
- Abuja City
- Ekinrin-Adde Community
- Ekinrin-Adde Community
- Egiland
- Ado Ekiti
- Ikere Ekiti

=== Ojude Oba Festival ===
The Ojude Oba Festival is an ancient festival celebrated by the Muslim people of Ijebu Ode, a town in Ogun State. The festival, which takes place annually, is usually witnessed on the third day after Eid al-Adha, to pay homage and show respect to the Royal Majesty, the Awujale of Ijebuland. It is one of the most spiritual and glamorous festivals celebrated in Ijebuland and, more generally, in Ogun State as a whole.

It is a one-day festival where different cultural age groups, known as regberegbe and indigenes, along with their friends and associates, far and near, parade before the king's palace on the third day of the Eid al-Adha festival, popularly referred to as "Ileya" in the Yoruba language. Oba Adetona was the one that brought back the age groups in the 18th century.
