= Nupe Cultural Day =

Annual cultural event in Nigeria

- Date: 26 June
- Location: Niger State
- Country: Nigeria
- People: Nupe people

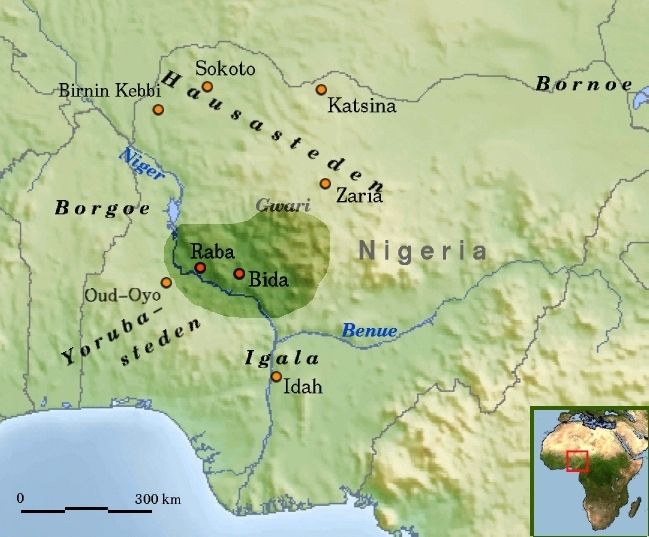
this is the map of Nupe region that participates in the yearly event

The Nupe Day Celebration is a traditional and cultural event or celebration observed in Nigeria on 26 June. The event is ordinarily celebrated by the Nupe community yearly in the country.

== History ==
The Nupe day event is a traditional and festival celebration, which marks the day when the British Army was defeated by a native African army on 26 June 1896, when the British Protectorate in Lokoja approached the Bida military camp at Ogidi of present Kogi State which brought about the defeat of the British Constabulary and the Union Jack was seized by the Nupe cavalry. The annual celebration was the founding idea of the Nupe elders through the tribes, Unlike the Durbar festival and the Pategi Ragatta boating festival which is also among Nupe event and Northern Nigeria traditional event.

The festival starts with prayers in both mosques and churches, respectively Sunday and Friday in the first and last day of the event. The leader of the occasion is the Etsu Nupe, Etsu Yahaya Abubakar who is the chairman Niger State Traditional council of rulers, the event discuss in the rich cultural heritage and to prevent the tribe encounter's total extinction. It also includes lectures on topic and issues concerning Nupe's history, background, culture and development. The Nupe festival presents merit awards in agriculture sector to promote agriculture in Nupeland.

== Nupe Day And Niger’s economic transformation ==
Niger State Governor Alhaji Abubakar Sani Bello opined; ‘the birth of the annual Nupe Day celebration, which showcases the rich cultural heritage of Nupe people and various crafts to the world, opened a new vista in the economic transformation of the state.’

The 9th Nupe Day celebration was held at the Etsu Nupe palace in Bida from 24 to 26 of November after the postponement from June 26 this year because of the Ramadan period

== See also ==
- Festivals in Nigeria
