= Gadar Tamburawa River =

River in Nigeria

The Gadar Tamburawa is a river in Nigeria, just south Kano. Gada means bridge in Hausa language.

Tamburawa is a town located a mile and a half mile from the river. A prominent town in Dawakin Kudu Local Government, Kano state. The inhabitants of Tamburawa are Hausa

== Source of water ==
Situated near the Gadar Tamburawa River, is a big water treatment plant that was built and constructed by the Kano state government. It is among the important source of water in Kano state to make the pipe borne water accessible to all the citizens and closer community. The water treatment plant is capable of generating 150ml of water per day.

== Water Treatment Plan ==
Kano and the neighboring areas can receive 150Ml of drinkable water per day from the Tamburawa Water Treatment Plant. The raw water is taken from the Kano River and treated using traditional methods to provide potable water that easily exceeds the minimum standards set by the World Health Organization for drinking water.

== Pollution ==
The river is contaminated with copper, iron, and manganese due to the flow of the river Chalawa river, which runs through an industrial area where industry released untreated waste.
