= Songs of Nigeria Festival =

Nigeria cultural music festival

Songs of Nigeria Festival (SONIFES)
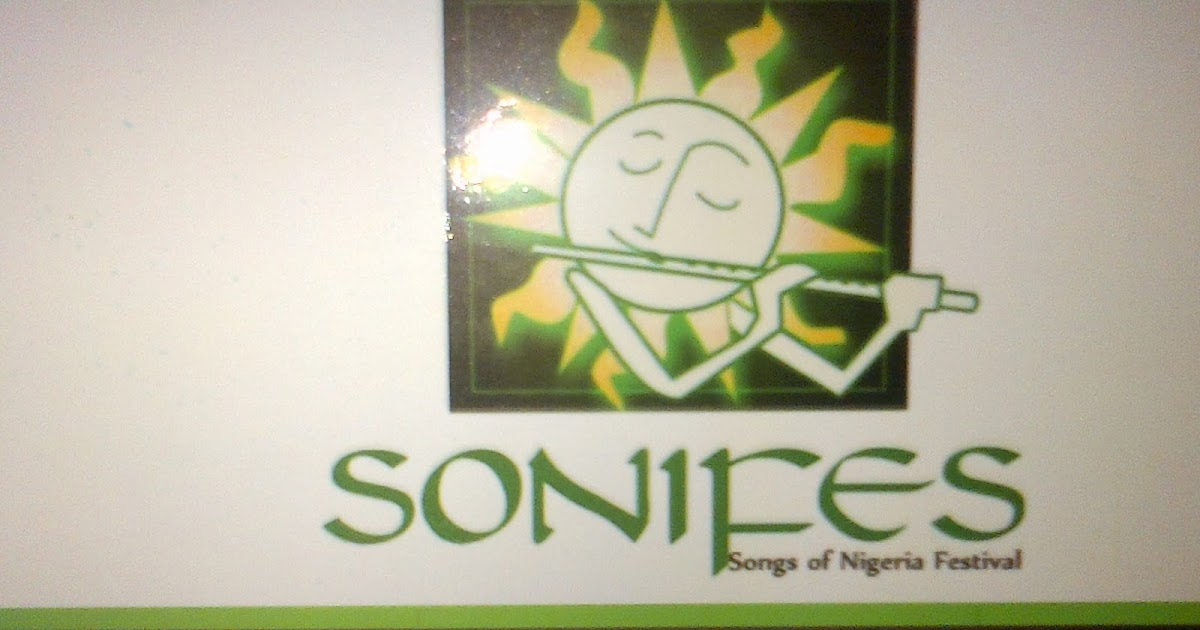
- Status: Active
- Genre: Festivals in Nigeria
- Frequency: Annually
- Country: Nigeria
- Inaugurated: 2009

Songs of Nigeria Festival (SONIFES) is a festival in Nigeria which aims to promote the diversity in Nigeria's cultural heritage hence promoting peaceful coexistence amongst Nigerians by means of art and other cultural performances.

== History ==
The Songs of Nigeria Festival (SONIFES) was launched in 2009 with the aim of bringing together cultural groups from different part of the country to come together in one accord to celebrate Nigerian songs. The Executive Secretary of the Songs of Nigeria Festival (SONIFES) is Chuks Akamadu. The 10th edition of the Songs of Nigeria Festival (SONIFES) was celebrated in grand style in 2018 with a lot of innovations brought in to further bring the festival to limelight.

== 2018 Edition of Songs of Nigeria Festival ==
The 2018 edition of Songs of Nigeria Festival (SONIFES) held on Thursday, November 15, 2018 at the Shehu Yar'Adua centre in Abuja, Nigeria. The festival featured a lot of notable individuals and government officials, some notable people who graced the festival event includes: the secretary to the government of the federation (SGF), Boss Mustapha and also the wife to the first military head of state, Victoria Aguiyi-Ironsi were present and scheduled to speak at the 2018 edition of the Festival. The Executive Secretary of the SONIFES, Chuks Akamadu also made it known that the 2018 edition of the festival aims to address unity in diversity and hence the theme was 'Harnessing the beauty of our diversity Seven Up Bottling company was also an official sponsor of the 2018 festival.

== See also ==
- Festivals in Nigeria
