= Tamburawa =

Tamburawa is a prominent town in Dawakin Kudu Local Government located 15 km from Kano City in Kano State, Nigeria. The inhabitant of Tamburawa are Hausa, mostly lecturers, farmers, union workers, and businessmen. Irrigation farming is widely practiced. Tamburawa which is also known as Tamburawa Yamma, is a unique and homogeneous town. In the 2006 population census, Tamburawa and its remote villages were marked with a number of approximately 13,453 inhabitants. It is also divided into four major zones i.e. Kofar Arewa, Kofar Gabas, Kofar Yamma, and lastly Kofar Kudu. The people of Tamburawa have great enthusiasm for the game of football. It has a particular team that normally stands for the town in competitions or leagues that is Tamburawa United. The geographical location of Tamburawa is 11,52W 17,50E and 8,32 15.55E. standing 1450 ft above sea level. Tamburawa people of course practice child marriage in the community although they are said to be doing it according to the Shariah Law. Tamburawa is the centre of a prosperous, densely populated, agricultural region in which millet, rice, peanuts, and beans are produced. It is an important market centre for peanuts, livestock, grains, and other foodstuffs from the surrounding area. The people of Tamburawa are mostly followers of one religion, which is Islam. About 99.9% of the people are Muslims.

== History ==
Under the Kingdom of Kano (and later the Kano Emirate), the sarki (king) appointed his Sarkin Tambari exclusively from Tamburawa (or Tambarawa), which was the source of the town's name. This official and his lineage lived in the town and were responsible for repairing, guarding, and playing the royal kettle-drums, which were beaten on Thursday nights during Ramadan, as well as whenever the sarki rode out for the Idi festivals or for war.

== Major developments ==
In 2007, the governor of Kano State announced the project of the Tamburawa Water treatment work, which supplies about 13 local governments with treated water. Tamburawa Water Treatment Plant has the capacity to deliver 150 million litres of potable water per day to the city of Kano and surrounding areas. The raw water is sourced from the Kano River, and treated using conventional treatment processes to produce potable water that readily exceeds World Health Organisation's minimum requirements for drinking water. The multi-billion project was accomplished by COSTAIN Construction Company, which provided employment opportunity to the people of Tamburawa because of the availability of labour.

Pfizer in 2009 reached a separate $75 million / N102 billion settlement with Kano State government to compensate victims of the experimental antibiotic Trovan on children during a meningitis outbreak without receiving adequate prior consent. Following the choice of the Kano State Government, and provision of land by the state government, the board commenced work on construction of a Diagnostic and Disease Control Centre in Tamburawa, Kano State in 2010. The over $25.5 million / N4.4 billion facility sits on 9.6 ha (1,030,000 ft^{2}) of land with a built-up area of approximately 2.9 ha (310,000 ft^{2}). The health facility, which has been completed and fully equipped, is already handed over to the Kano State government. The centre contains various facilities including: public health laboratory, micro biological reference laboratory, diagnostic centre, 100 beds patient ward facility, ultra-modern kitchen and dining facility, staff quarters and mortuary Gains for Kano. The state-of-the-art medical facility is a unique medical facility that has the potential to uplift health care in Kano in particular and Nigeria in general. It provides facilities for the training of medical doctors and other key health care professionals in the country. It houses special facilities for conducting research for infectious diseases such as malaria, cholera, poliomyelitis and meningitis among others. The DDCC has facilities to quarantine patients during epidemic outbreak just like the recent Ebola outbreak. Experts said the facility will assist medical personnel in tracking individual strains of causative agents and diseases so as to determine the required medication. The facility which has a functional public health laboratory to conduct research into other aspects of medicine bordering on public safety will as well boost research efforts in Nigeria. The Medical Centre currently employs security men, gardeners and artisans from the local population.

Though Tamburawa is in the Outskirt of Kano, it is highly connected to the Major city of Kano with a ranging distance of about 10–15 km away from the city with a good transportation Network. The history of Tamburawa's rise as a Hausa Community, and its emergence as a major remote town is documented in the Kano Chronicle, a richly detailed manuscript compiled in the 18th to 19th century from earlier sources.
