= Oronna Festival =

Festival in Ogun state, Nigeria

- Status: Active
- Genre: Festivals
- Date: November
- Frequency: Annually
- Location: Ilaro
- Country: Nigeria

The Oronna Festival is an ancient festival celebrated by the Ilaro Kingdom. Ilaro is a town in Ogun State, and the headquarter of YEWA southwest local government also known as the YEWALAND. The Ilaro people celebrate the Oronna festival annually to preserve, uphold, and celebrate the rich cultural heritage of Ilaro Kingdom. Oronna who was known by the Ilaro people to be a hero, a brave warrior who was said to have brought several victories to the land during war, mostly against the Dahomeans Army who constantly threatens the peace of the Land. He was a man who distinguishes, and committed himself to the safety, well-being of the land as he stood in war to defend the land against intruders.

== Festivity ==
The annual Oronna festival which always happen by November is one that last for just one week. Within this one week are lots events that features all of Ilaro cultural and social life such as: Street Carnival, Tourism activities, cultural beauty pageant, 50 kilometer race, Medical check-up programs.
