= Kayo-Kayo Festival =

Lagos State of Nigeria festival

Kayo-Kayo festival
- Language: Yoruba

Origin
- Meaning: Local Wrestling
- Region of origin: southern Region, Nigeria

Kayo-Kayo festival is an annual religious and cultural state festival celebrated by the descendants of Oba Kosoko for the historical arrival of King Kosoko to Epe in the year 1851. Kayo-Kayo which literary means “eating to satisfaction” is known with the Epe community of Lagos State.

The festival is usually observed during the first month of the Islamic calendar in commemoration of ‘Yaom-al Ashura’ the 10th day of Muharram in the Islamic calendar, which is about a month after the Muslim festival of Eid-El-Kabir.

The Kayo-Kayo festival has grown to become a veritable platform to advance, develop and promote the local economy, to discuss the socio-economic challenges of the community and most significantly, to propagate their rich cultural heritage.

== History ==
In 1851, King Kosoko arrived with 1500 people to lay the foundation of Eko-Epe. This brought about the yearly traditional kayo-kayo festival that is observed to commemorate his arrival. And the festival has been celebrated ever since then, to mimic how King Kosoko came to Epe.

=== Kayo-Kayo 2016 and 2017 ===
The 2016 edition of the festival featured the former governor of Lagos State, Governor Akinwunmi Ambode, who declared open the festival with other various top dignitaries. Also, the 2017 kayo-kayo festival was attended by the former Governor of Lagos State as well as the commissioner for physical planning in Lagos State, Biola Anifowoshe.

=== Kayo-Kayo 2018 ===
In 2018, over 50,000 indigenes and non-indigenes were expected to participate in the festival, it was recorded that over 20 hostels situated in Epe town was fully booked during the festival. The 2018 kayo-kayo festival hosted former governor of Lagos State, Governor Akinwunmi Ambode, Otunba Gani Adams, the Aare Oona Kakanfo of Yoruba; Dr. Abiola Dosunmu, Erelu of Lagos, traditional rulers in the state as well as music stars including Malaika, Queen Salawa Abeni and Sugar Boy.

=== Kayo-Kayo 2019 ===
The 2019 edition of the festival was more centered and focused on the economic well-being of the community through meaningful investment in the youth segment, aside the cultural and social values that makes up the annual feast. They launched a scholarship scheme to support the educational pursuit of 35 tertiary students.

Adeyemi Ikuforiji, a former Speaker, Lagos State House of Assembly was present in the 2019 edition where he urged Epe indigenes to pray for Mr Ambode's successful clinching of the All Progressives Congress’ ticket at the governorship direct primary election. Also, popular Fuji singer, Wasiu Alabi Pasuma drove the entertainment content of the 2019 kayo-kayo festival.

=== Kayo-Kayo 2020 ===
Despite the virulent COVID-19 pandemic, the ancient town of Epe still held its cultural festival of kayo kayo with strict compliance to COVID-19 safety protocols.

=== Kayo-Kayo 2023 ===
Activities lined up for the 7-day event include a religious competition, the annual Kayokayo festival prayer at the Palace of Olu of Epe, and a medical mission for people in the community. The paramount ruler of Epe, King Shefiu Olatunji Adewale highlighted the festival as an avenue to promote the rich culture of the Epe community.

== Festivity ==
The Kayo-Kayo festival is a week-long festival, which comprises three dimensions. The religious dimension which aims at heralding the New Islamic Year with 1st Hijra calendar Muharram, the cultural dimension which commemorates King Kosoko's landing in Epe and lastly, the social dimension which is about celebrating communal bonding by making and sharing abundant food to all.

The festival features several activities which includes a fashion parade show, heath awareness and screening, cultural displays, display of the best of Epe foods and youth parade. In order to display their culture at its best, they go to marina in boats to mimic how King Kosoko came to Epe in 1851.

In 2018, Several sites were visited during the festival, among sites visited is the house occupied by Divisional Officers (colonial masters), another site is King Kosoko's disembarking point and boat in 1851, where a giant Etufu (traditional torch) was lit and left for a period of seven days. The last day of 2019 festival was rounded off on Saturday with a boat ride that symbolizes Prophet Noah's ark.

The Day one of the festival begins with Juma’at prayers, followed by a press conference. Day two features a Royal visit to the Olu-Epe of Epe Kingdom in the morning and later in the evening, the Tahjud night is observed at the first Epe central mosque. A special Jummat service takes place on day three also at the first Epe central mosque.

The fourth and final day which is on a Saturday comprises three activities. The first is the annual Kayo-Kayo Prayer at the Palace of Olu-Epe of Epe Kingdom, the second activity is the Epe Kayo-Kayo festival drama display and performance at the Epe theatre, and the last activity is the lightening of Etufu by the Olu-Epe of Epe Kingdom.

Some various side activities include the Kayo-Kayo empowerment raffle draw, where a car and other consolatory prizes will be won, as well as a football competition, a quaranic competition, a youth rally, children's party, royal visit by the Oba to the districts of Epe founding fathers, Royal procession on the Lagoon beach and the Kayokayo Musical Night.
