= Opobo Nwaotam Festival =

Cultural festival celebrated by the people of Opobo kingdom

Opobo Nwaotam festival
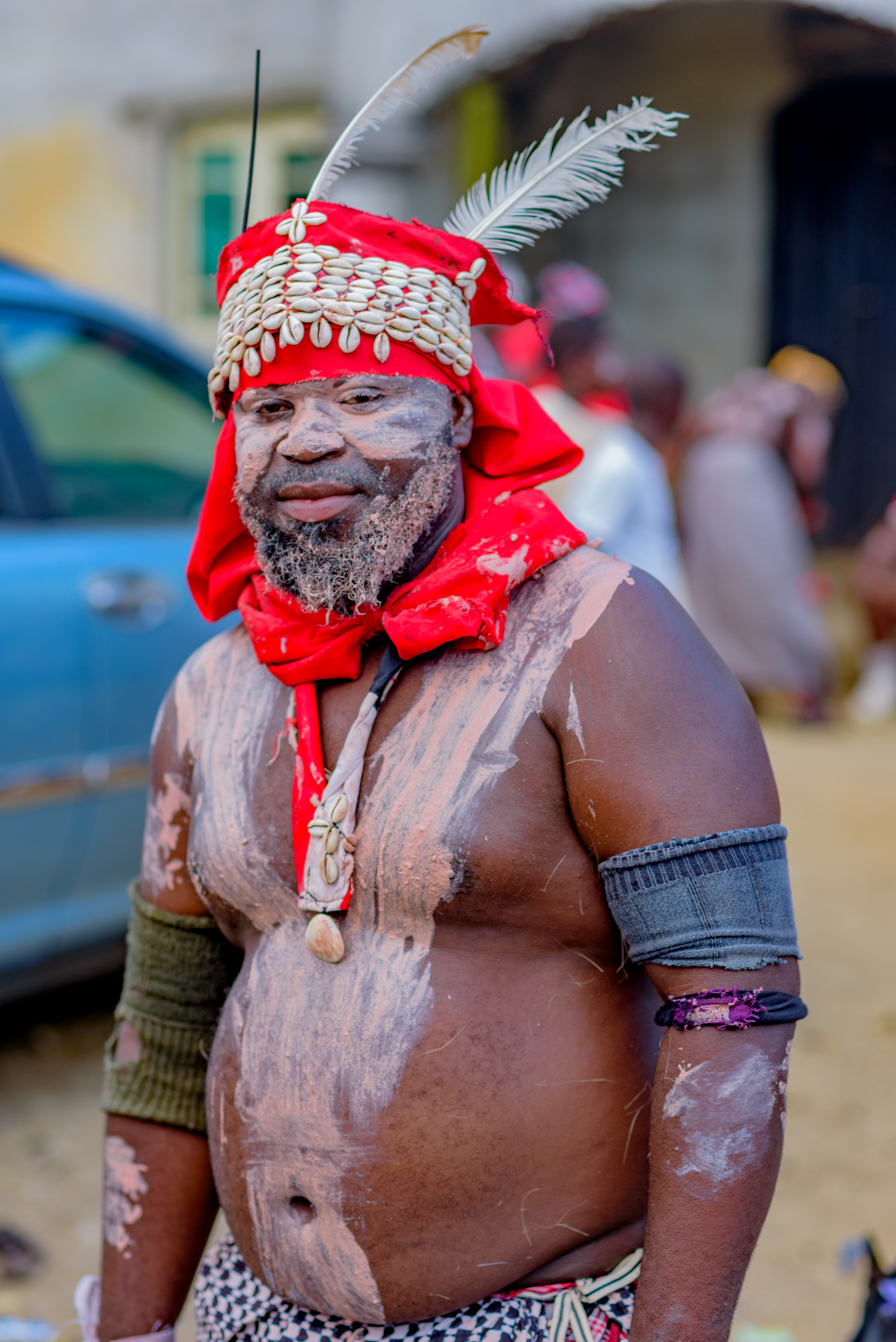
- Opobo Nwaotam festival
- Language: Ibani-Ijaw

Origin
- Meaning: Local Play
- Region of origin: South South, Nigeria

Opobo Nwaotam Festival is a cultural festival that is usually celebrated by the people of Opobo kingdom to unite the guest and the villagers. the Opobo Nwaotam Festival is usually celebrated every 25 December in Port Harcourt except on a Sunday of that day. The festival is also celebrated on the 31st of every December and 1st of January of every year to usher in the new year, this cultural festival is rooted in the heritage of the Ibani people. this cultural festival is played on the roof of the building no matter how high the building is.

== Origin ==
the Opobo Nwaotam Festival can be traced back to the Ndoki in Abia State. the people of Ndoki has once had a long termed relationship with the people of Ibani people of Bonny and the Opobo.

== Gallery ==
Uke Nwaotam festival

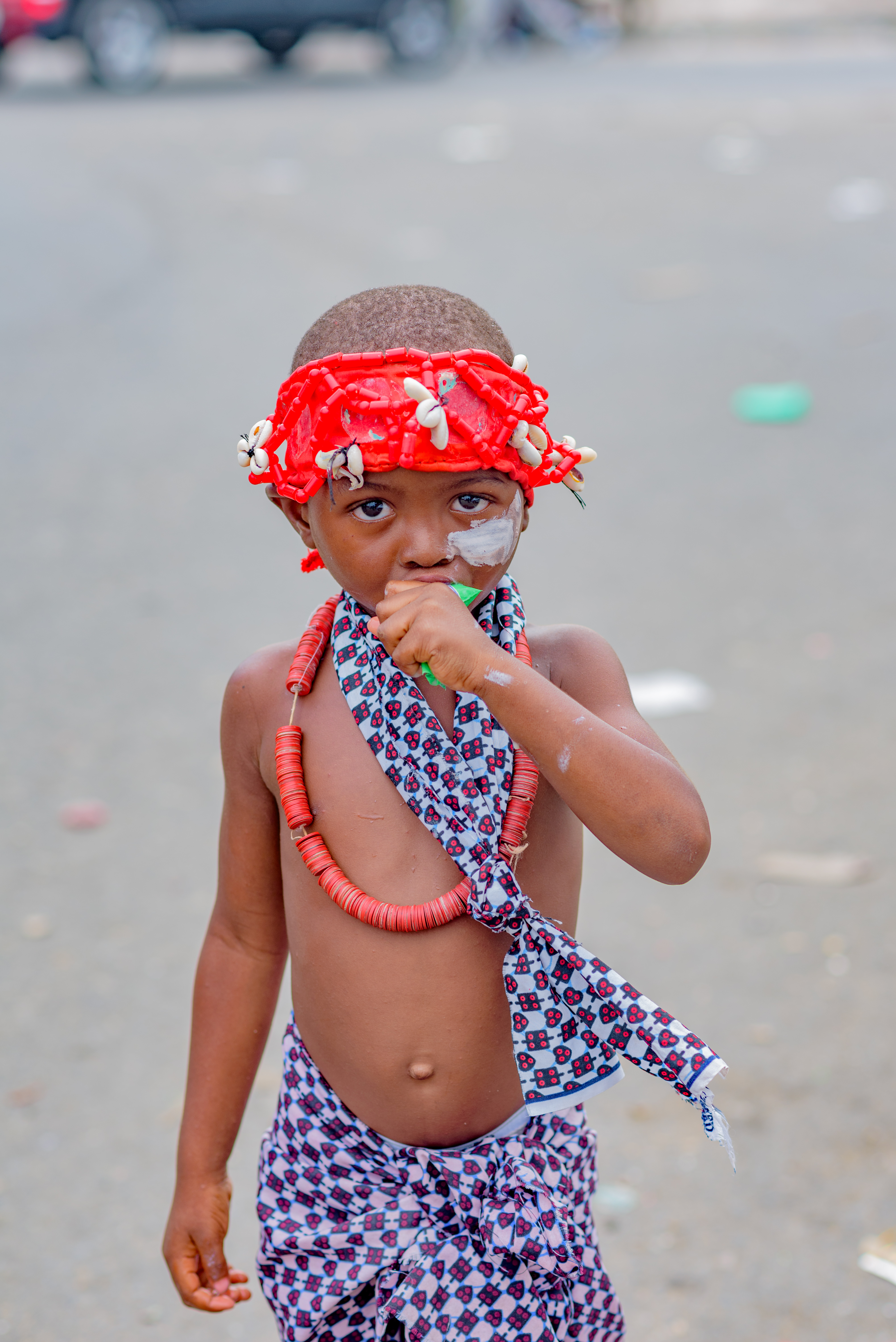

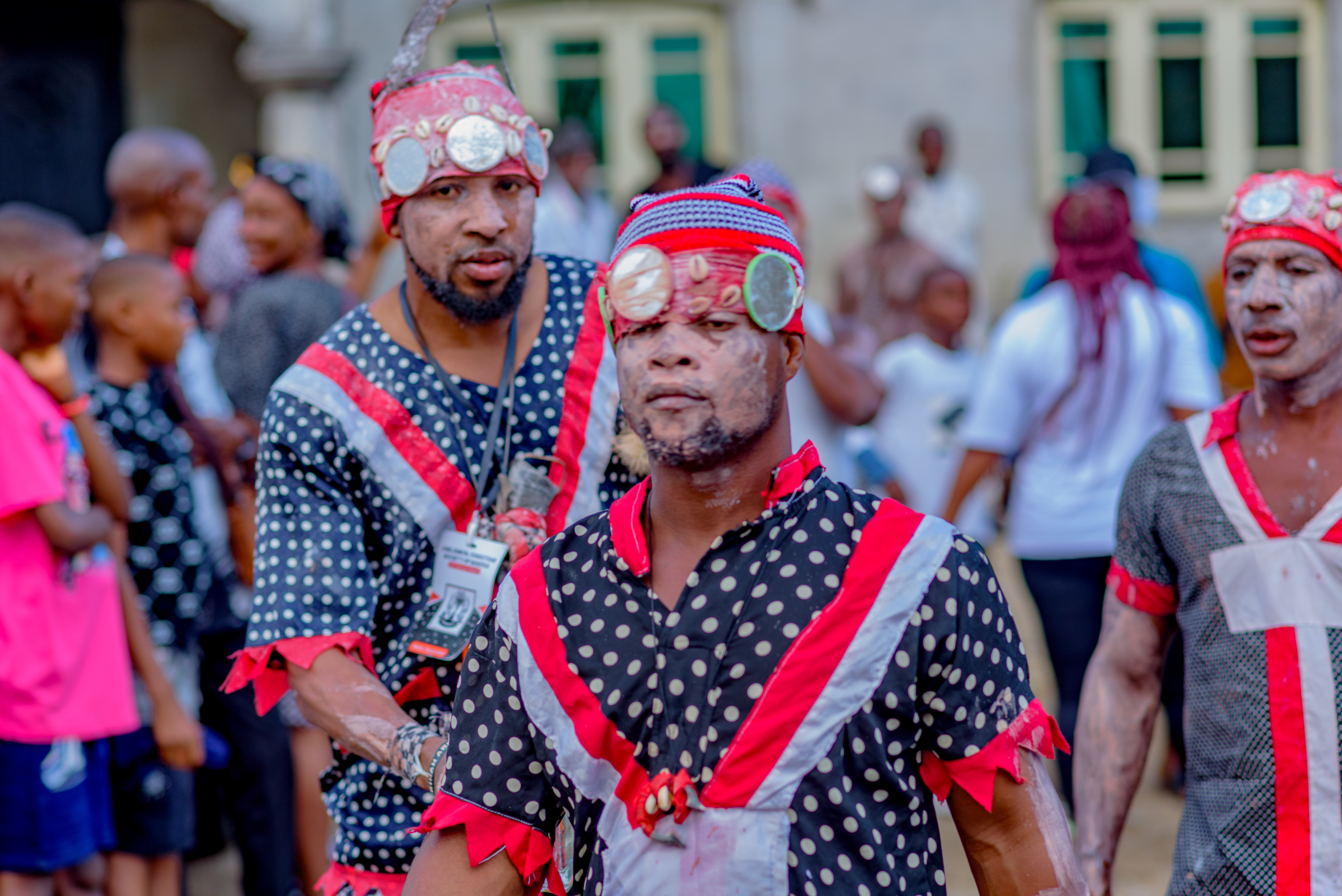

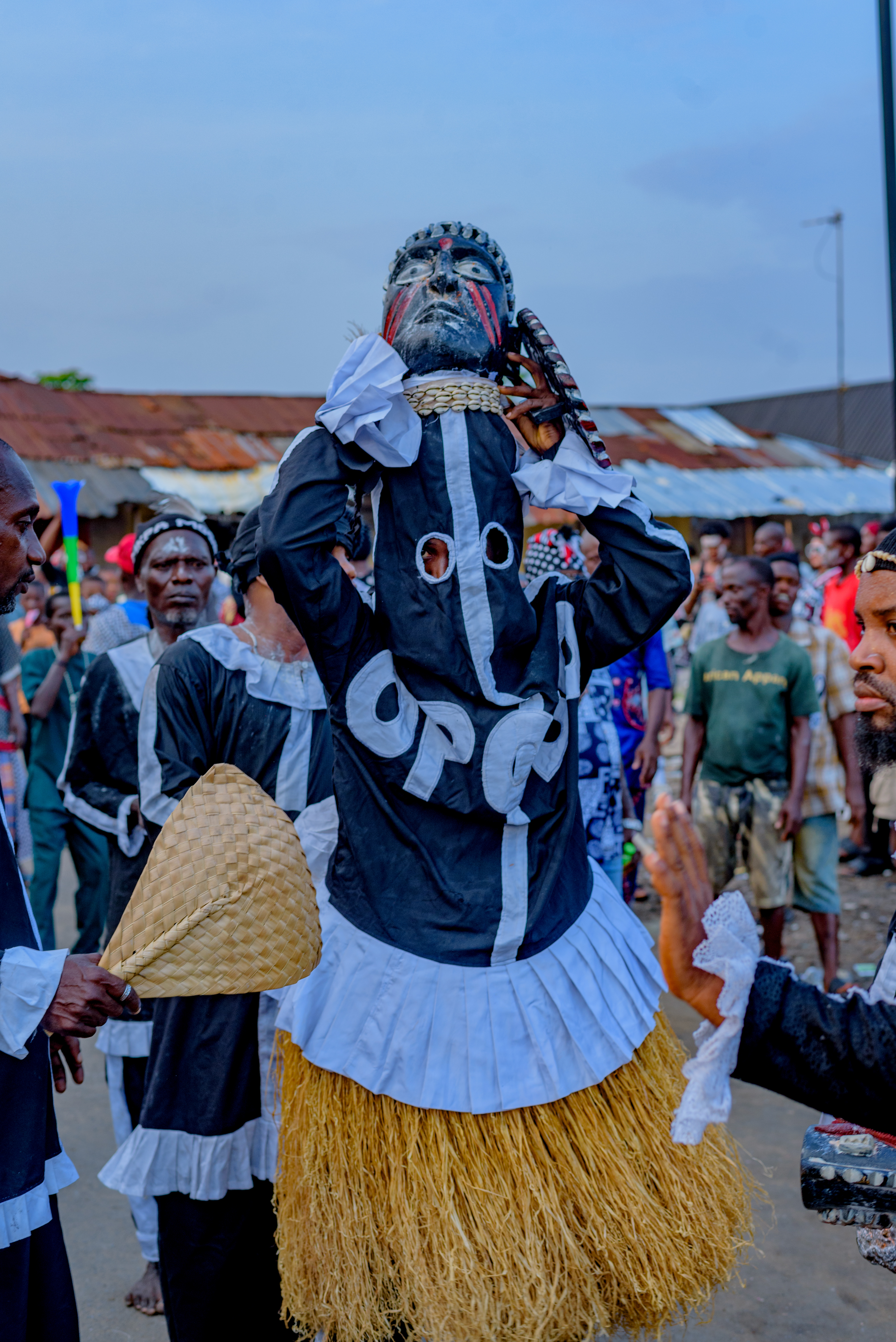

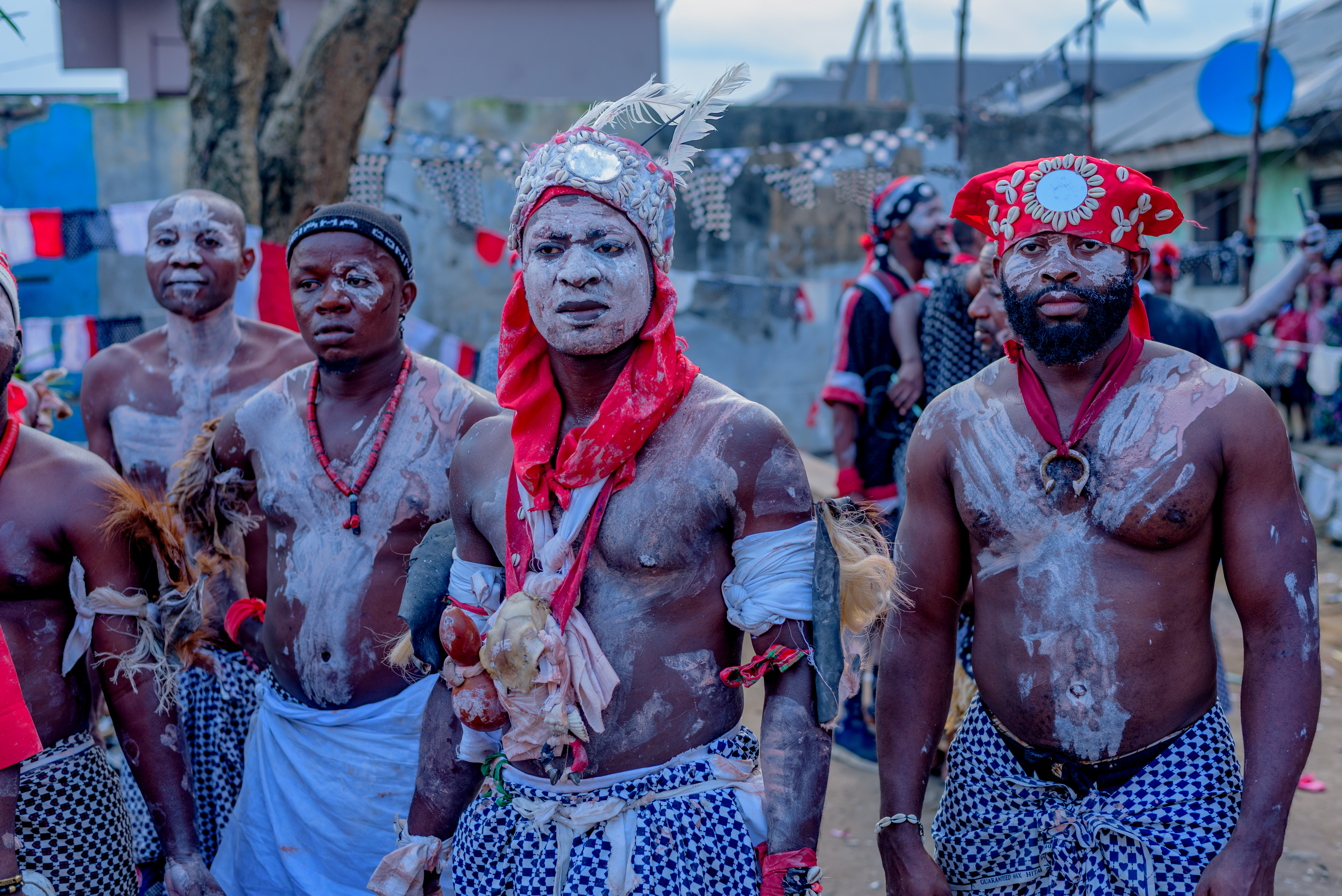

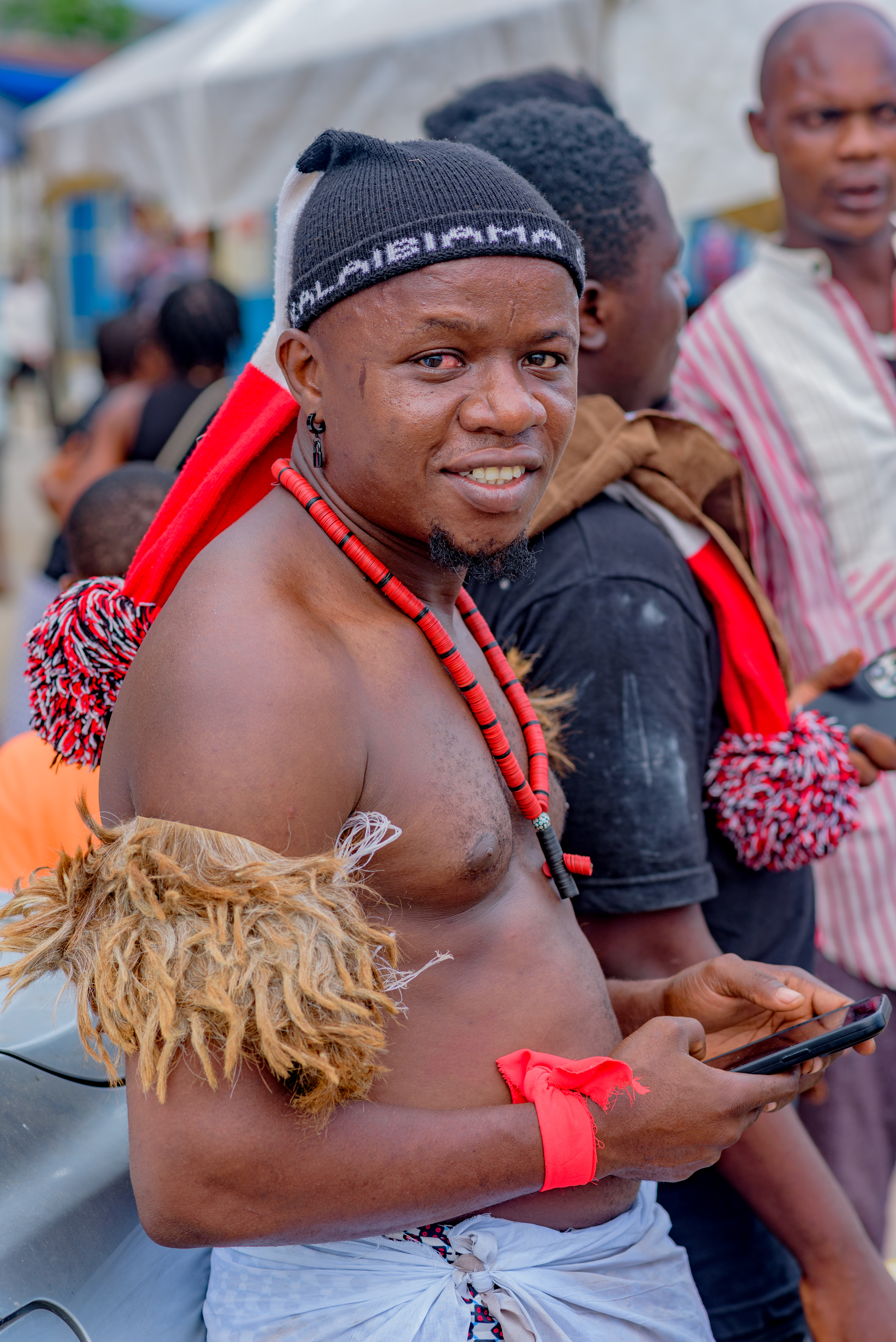
