= Mainland BlockParty =

Nigerian music festival

- Status: Active
- Genre: Afrobeats; house; amapiano; pop; hip hop; trap
- Date: Last Sunday's
- Frequency: Monthly
- Location: Lagos
- Country: Nigeria
- Years active: 2018–present
- Organiser: TopBoy Entertainment; Plug Live
- Website: www.mainlandblockparty.com

The BlockParty Series started in Lagos, Nigeria as Mainland BlockParty in 2018. Formed by Oluwatobi Mohammed, the party series comprises Island BlockParty, Capital BlockParty, Garden BlockParty, Premier BlockParty, Gold BlockParty, and a BlockParty pop-up at Afro Nation. The music festival is held monthly on the last Sunday of the month except for the anniversary edition on 1 January. It holds in various cities including Abuja, Port Harcourt, Ibadan, and Accra. The party series is produced by TopBoy Entertainment and Plug Live It is one of West Africa’s biggest monthly youth festivals by attendance drawing considerable media attention internationally.

== History ==
Mainland BlockParty is organized by Tobi Mohammed, Moyo Shomade, Bizzle Osikoya, and Asa Asika. It was created to celebrate youth culture and promote cross-cultural connections across several African cities. The event is held monthly at Secret Garden, Ikeja. It has partnered with MTV Base, Spotify, Jameson, Johnnie Walker, and A Whitespace Creative Agency. On 12 November 2016, BlockParty in partnership with A Whitespace Creative Agency, to launch the AWCA BlockParty.

== Discography ==
On 8 August 2020, Mainland BlockParty presented a collaborative single with Victony titled "Space & Time", as the first single off its collaborative extended play with Victony titled Saturn. On 8 April 2021, Mainland BlockParty released a compilation studio album titled Confluence Project in partnership with Jameson Irish Whiskey, featuring Alpha P, Fave, Naeto C, Ladipoe, Terry Apala, Bnxn, and Joeboy. Exclusively produced by Tobi Mohammed, with additional production from Sess The PRBLM Kid, SynX, and Adey.
