= Sharo Festival =

Nigerian test of a young man's manhood

- Status: Active
- Genre: Festivals
- Frequency: Twice a year
- Location: Northern Nigeria
- Country: Nigeria
- Major events: tricksters, minstrels,
- People: Fulani

The Sharo Festival is a festival common among the Fulanis. Sharo is a Fulani term used to express the test of young man's manhood by introducing flogging. The Fulanis are located at the Northern Region of Nigeria. The festival is held twice a year in the Fulani community, the first is held during dry season at the period of guinea corn harvesting preparation while the second festival in a year is performed during the Muslim Celebration Eid-el-Kabir. The essence of the festival is to test the bravery and endurance of boys who passing into manhood.

== Festivity ==
The Sharo festival is held for a week stretched, and always done in a public, open or market place. Many activities and events take place during the one week festival, part of this performance activities are; tricksters, minstrels, and maiden dancers. The primary and most awaited part of the festival starts as you see bare-chested, unmarried men who are accompanied to the center of the crowd by beautiful young girls. The bands cheers the crowd by introducing drumbeats and sounds as the contenders gazed into their challengers eyes to show that they are in fear of nothing. The families of the contenders watch and pray not to be disgraced by their sons, because a son who cannot endure the pain that comes with flogging brings disgrace to the family. To avoid shame and disgrace, most contenders prior to the Sharo festival day would have gone to fortify themselves by spiritual means in order not to or reduce the pain felt during the flogging period.

The flogging would leave scars on the proud contenders, who believe the scars are marks of courage and a successful transition to manhood. After the flogging, the brave boys become men and are given permission to marry the girl of their choice.

In some occasions, when an argument or rival ensue over a lady or two boys are contending to get a lady, to avoid more clash of words and fight they challenge themselves to the Sharo and whichever of them can endure or comes out as winner of the flogging takes the girl as the other who was defeated hands down.

During the festival there is a Referee who ensures that the rule of the game is strictly followed, he has the power to stop the flogging if he see any foul play by either party, any contender surrenders, the injury recorded by either contender is severe or anything he sees not right. Also, as the flogging starts contenders are expected to sing and dance which is a sign of bravery and strength and that they are not in pain and whoever can endure or wins the flogging is declared to have transited to manhood.
