= Ariginya Festival =

Nigerian customary celebration

- Language: Yoruba

Origin
- Meaning: Local Wrestling
- Region of origin: southern Region, Nigeria

Ariginya Festival is a commonly celebrated festival celebrated in one of the Ondo State town called Ikare Akoko. Depending on the dialect and mode of pronunciation, some call it Aringinya. This festival is said to be one of the foremost traditional festivals celebrated in this town since its inception. Ikare-Akoko is one of the towns located in the southwest region of Nigeria, and in the Yoruba area. The festival is one of many festivals that is set to celebrate virginity and chastity among female genders as the Yoruba land is known for her worth and high value pertaining to decency and purity. The festival is such that helps to improve the mindset of dignity and purity as well as the value of a woman staying pure and reserved until the wedding and only to her husband. This has helped to improve the rate of decency in the town as young girls understands the price and the worth and that one of the greatest virtue of a woman is her virginity and a media to stand against sexual abuse and harassment.

== History ==
Knowing from history through books, stories and other records of how princes migrated from ile-ife to settle in various locations and found different towns and cities that we have existing today, Ikare-Akoko wasn't left out. Ikare-Akoko is also said to have been founded by a prince who migrated from Ile-Ife with the name Owa Ale Agbaode. He was one of the Odudwa grandchildren. His settlement in Ikare was a result of the instructions given by Ifa (one of the Yoruba gods). On arriving in Ikare, he settled at a place now called ''Oke iba'' that is sited behind a hill and a brook called the ''omi Atan'' that does not run dry even in dry seasons.

This water is said to be the supernatural abode of a goddess. The goddess named Ariginya appears to the people of the land and blesses them every year in the month of May. Therefore, the community reserved this period when the goddess visited as a festive period, and since the appearance of the goddess as described by the people showcases purity, the festive season became a period to celebrate the purity of womanhood and any young woman who has lost her virginity is not allowed to move close to the brook. Though Aringinya is a festival celebrated by the whole community, it is said that only true maidens of the land participate in the festival.

The goddess is known as the goddess of chastity, fruitfulness, and harvest. The festival is celebrated prior to the planting season and it is said that it is taboo for rain to fall during this festive period. If such happens, it is an indication that one or more of the maidens that have gone to the brook have lost their virginity and this will lead to the consultation of the Ifa priest to bring out the offender.

== Festivity ==
It is said that the Ariginya festival is a week-long festival celebrated prior to the planting season as a way of procuring the blessing of the goddess for fruitfulness, harvest, and chastity. During the festive period, only the young maiden (virgin) can participate in the festival pertaining to the omi Atan. Most girls that visit the brook are naked, as only the waist beads are left with tattoos drawn on their faces and bodies drawn with chalk and white lime. They march to the brooks as they do the traditional dances while the sounds of drums, gongs and other traditional musical instruments are heard. The males help to clear the path to the brook as well as clean it. After a while, the goddess will come out of the river and bless the maidens and the community and married women who are seeking the fruit of the womb will now step out to receive the blessing of fruitfulness from the goddess. Post this activity, the masquerade called igede-oka appears and displays different styles.

At the end of the activities, the community will march and dance to the palace and receive blessings from the crown king.
