= Akata Benue Fishing Festival =

Fishing Festival in Benue State

- Language: Igbo

Origin
- Meaning: Local Wrestling
- Region of origin: Igbo Region, Nigeria

The Akata Festival is a fishing festival common among the Akata people. Akata is located at Katsina-Ala local government Area in Benue State, Nigeria. It is an annual festival celebration, and a fishing competition festival practiced among the Tiv, Etulo and Jukun fishermen where the fisherman with the highest catch is rewarded handsomely. This competition also reveals different fishing skills, as the competition is on-going, dances and drums with different practices by the community are performed.

The Festival is said to open the mind of individuals and organisations and widen their scopes and see streams of business opportunities to annex in Benue State. The festival stands as a medium to open families, Investors, companies, decision makers, and tourists to what the community can offer.

== Festivity ==
Yearly, the new festival tends to add more activities or details during the planning period by the committees, so as to improve the quality of the festival and the impart in the community life, yet some things are fixed such as the fishing and dancing activities. The Fishing event which is the main and primary focus of the festival helps to plant the love of fishing into young and growing ones, and also activate the burning desire of kids who have always wanted to go fishing but have no advantage or opportunity to do so, at this festival, they are provided with the advantage to join the fishing competition. This festival has always been an ignite to the passion of young men to Fishing.

Likewise, outside the Fishing events are more other educative events that takes place during this festival, some of this events are: Business Conference, Learning how to cook your catch professional cooking demonstration, Made in Benue Expo, Showcasing Fishing Tackle and Equipment Display, Hands-on-Fish focus.

The Entertainment events are: Wrestling, Power Bike Racing, Dancing, Boat Racing, Beauty Pageant, Arrow Shooting, Gala/Award Night, Cultural and Entertainment Night.
