= Ovia-Osese Festival =

Festival by the Ogori people

- Status: Active
- Genre: Festival
- Frequency: Annually
- Location: Kogi State
- Country: Nigeria
- Major events: Initiating teenage girls into adulthood
- People: Ogori

The Ovia-Osese Festival is an annual festival by the Ogori people in the Ogori-Magongo local government area of Kogi State, Nigeria. They share boundaries with Edo State and the Yoruba people. The festival annually initiate teenage girls who are at least 15 years old into adulthood. This initiation is only done for girls who have not been sexually active, and is meant to promote abstinence among younger girls and to discourage premarital sex.

== History ==
In the 1870s, each family of the Ogori community has a culture of initiating their daughters into adulthood. During this time the family, educates the daughter on subjects such as keeping a home and cooking. Later, this family culture became a community culture and is practised yearly as a festival to celebrate young girls having reaching adulthood without having sex. The festival is also an opportunity for single men to socialize with the eligible young women.

== Festivity ==
During the festival, the young girls (called ibusuke) and the maiden (Ivia) perform a traditional dance to entertain the community and visitors who came for the festival. The dancers wear traditional attire, with beads on their necks and wrist. The festival also features a cooking competition, talent hunt, free health programme, sporting events, school debate and quiz, and a beauty pageant.
