= Golibe Festival =

Festival in Onitsha, Nigeria

- Begins: Monday 25 December 2018
- Venue: Ime Obi Ezechima Palace, Onitsha, in Kings Courtyard.
- Location: Anambra State
- Country: Nigeria
- Founder: His Majesty, Nnaemeki Achebe, CFR, mni, Agbogidi and Onitsha's

Golibe Festival, which simply means 'To Rejoice’, is a festival in the City of Onitsha, that aims to demonstrate to the world the city's rich cultural history. It is an art, music, culture, family, and community event From Christmas Eve to New Year, Golibe brings together residents of Anambra and the whole of southeastern countries and visiting indigenous people from the Diaspora.

== History ==
The Festival was one of the outcomes of His Majesty, Nnaemeki Achebe, CFR, mni, Agbogidi and Onitsha's "Onitsha in the 21st Century" project in 2016 to attract Onitsha, Onitsha indigenous, Eastern Nigerian and other Nigerians, both at home and in the diaspora, to take advantage of the rich culture of Onitscha and its position as a center for commerce and the diaspora.

The first edition of the Golibe festival began on Monday 25 December 2018 with an opening ceremony at the Ime Obi Ezechima Palace, Onitsha, in Kings Courtyard. The event gave a forum for friends and relatives to gather together in arts, music, and other channels to celebrate their ancestry, identity, and roots. It provides a secure venue for the expression of the South-Eastern cultural heritage through 'culture, cooking and colors.' The Obi of Onitsha, Igwe Alfred Achebe, called the Festival a "cultural initiative aimed at revitalizing and repositioning Onitsha's culture and economy."

The festival also aimed at creating an opportunity to grow the local economy in the South East, since individuals, groups, small market companies, and corporations could use it for the purpose of growing their businesses and brands and also provide local people with the opportunity to take part in a way that would benefit them economically.

== Festivity ==
The festival features video documentaries, history, culture and traditions, cultural dances, the display of arts and crafts, master seminars on local cuisine and drinks, and many more.

=== Activities ===
The festival is packed with the events that follow;

1. 24 December, Opening Ceremony
2. Presentation of Drama on 25 December
3. Night of Comedy, December 25
4. Finals for Food Competition, 26 December
5. 26 December, Football Finals
6. Presentation of drama on 26 December
7. 26 December, Highlife/Senior Night
8. 27 December, Pageantry (Face of Golibe)
9. 28 December, Carnival Parade
10. 29 December, Carnival Masquerade
11. 29 December, DJ Party/Hip Hop Night
12. 30 December, Musical Concert
13. 31 December, DJ Party/Crossover Night and Fireworks
