= Tiger Street Food Festival =

Food festival in Nigeria

The Tiger Street Food Festival is a food ceremony in Nigeria. The festival was created to promote the street food experience and is sponsored by Tiger Beer, a product of Nigerian Breweries.

== History ==
The Tiger Street Food Festival debuted in December 2020 in the federal capital Abuja.

The first edition of the 2021 Tiger Street Food Festival was held in April at Cubana Lounge in New Owerri, Imo state. It was attended by Nigerian performers such as Bella Shmurda and Xbusta. The Tiger Street Food Festival held its second edition in July 2021 in IBB Square in Markudi, Benue State. Many Nigerian celebrities attended the festival, including Peruzzi, DJ Big N, DJ Tony, MC Smart, and Rapizo.

== Festivity ==
The Tiger Street Food Festival features food prepared by various vendors such as Zhie's Cuisine, Annie's Kitchen Events, Kitchen Chronicles, and Maozy Foods. Mobile restaurants, or food trucks, are present during the festival.
