= Nigeria International Book Fair =

Annual literary event held in Nigeria since 2001

Nigeria International Book Fair Festival
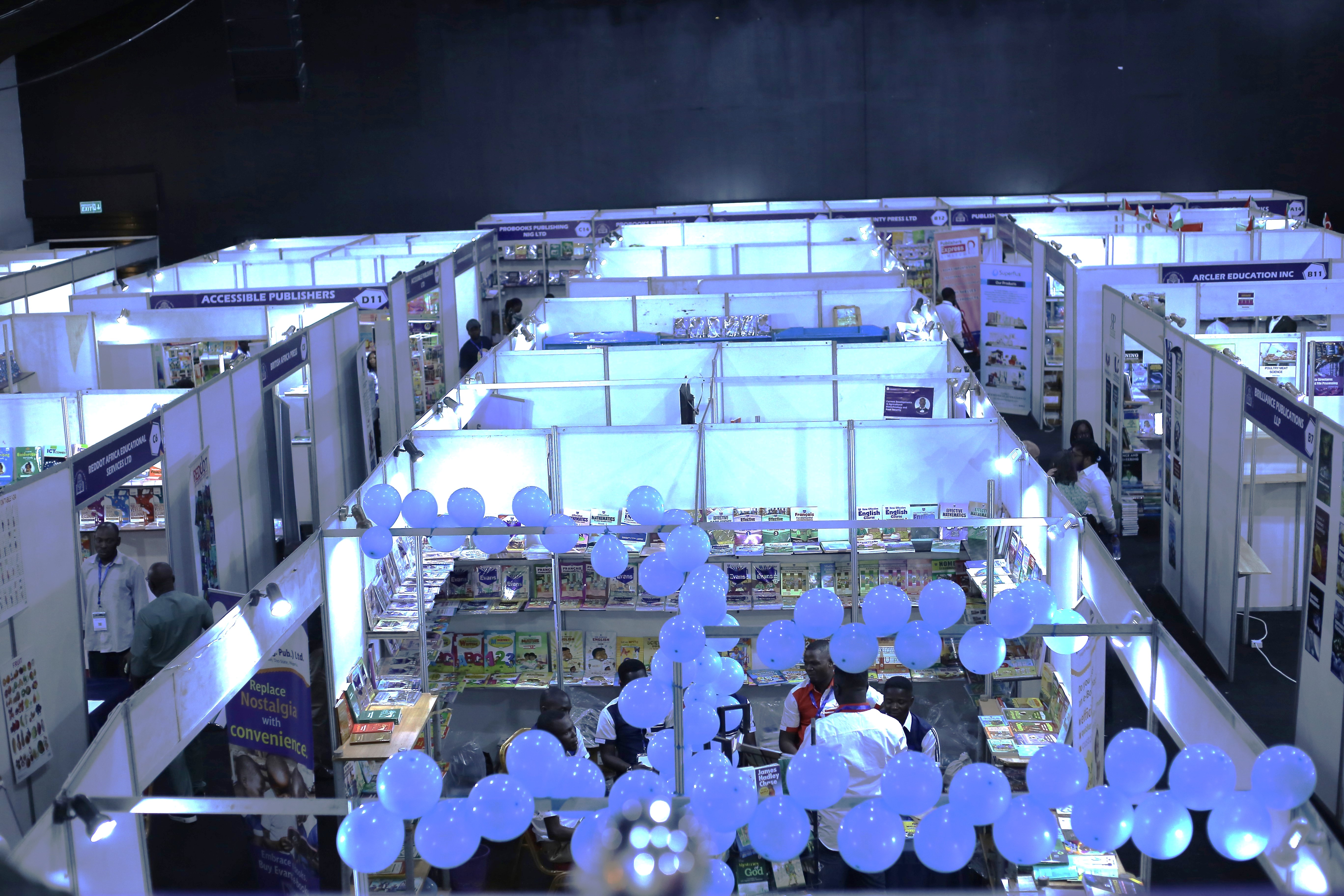
- 2025 Nigeria International Book Fair at the Balmoral Convention Centre, Sheraton, Ikeja, Lagos, Nigeria.
- Language: Yoruba

Origin
- Meaning: Local Wrestling
- Region of origin: southwestern Region, Nigeria

The Nigeria International Book Fair (NIBF) is an annual cultural event in Nigeria, established in 2001, and organised by the Nigeria Book Fair Trust (NBFT). Every second week of May, the NIBF brings together book enthusiasts such as writers, poets, booksellers, publishers, authors, illustrators, booksellers, printers, librarians, schools owners, government officials, and readers, from Nigeria and other parts of the world. The main aim of the festival is to promote and improve the reading culture among Nigerians and Africans as a whole.

== History ==
The Nigeria International Book Fair was inaugurated in 2001. The chairman of the event is also the chairman of Nigerian Book Fair Trust.

The 20th edition of the fair in 2021 hosted the president of the international Publisher Association (IPA), Geneva, Switzerland, Shiekha Bodour Al-Qasimi, as the keynote speaker, along with several prominent individuals including the Speaker of the Federal House of Representatives Rt. Hon. Femi Gbajabiamila as the Special Guest of Honour, First Lady of Ekiti State, Erelu Bisi Fayemi who was the chairperson of the event, and Africa's richest woman, Folorunso Alakija. The Governor of Lagos State, Babajide Sanwo-Olu, was the Chief Host.

This 20th edition of NIBF took place in Harbour Point, Victoria Island, 27–29 July 2021. The press conference was held in Protea Hotels Ikeja introducing the theme “Awakening the Giant in Women for the Growth of the Book Ecosystem” featured the physical showcasing of books. The fair was attended by book lovers from across the globe, including those who joined virtually.In 2022, after having been held in held in September and July in the previous two years because of the COVID-19 pandemic, the NIBF returned to its traditional month of May.

The 2023 NIBF was held on the Lagos mainland in Ikeja.

In 2024, Nigeria International book fair host the 23rd edition. The event was held at Yard 158, Kudirat Abiola Way, Oregun, Ikeja, Lagos. The theme of the conference was Universal Basic Education and the Book Ecosystem: Setting the Agenda.

In 2025, the event was held at Balmoral Convention Center, Sheraton, Ikeja, Lagos, from May 7 - 9, 2025. The for 2025 was Local Paper Production: Panacea to Affordable Book Production and Qualitative Education. Keynote address for the International Conference was delivered by Professor Abiodun Oluwafemi Oluwadare, of the department of Forest Production and Products, University of Ibadan.

The 2025 event which was hosted by Dare Oluwatuyi, Chairman of Nigeria Book Fair Trust, and Olugbemi Malomo, Vice-Chairman of Nigeria Book Fair Trust, featured important personalities including Tunji Alausa, Minister of Education, and John Owan Enoh, Minister of State for Industry, Trade and Investment.

== Festivity ==
The Nigeria International Book Fair festival majorly involves the display of several books for exhibition, providing a platform for the sale of these books to interested customers. The festival also features other programmes which includes; teachers training workshop, publishers workshop, a two-day programme for children, principal officers education summit, author's groove, printers seminar and others.

The summit of school owners and principal officers of schools in Nigeria was later introduced in the 2015 edition in bid to make the event a more memorable one for both the visitors and exhibitors.

The 2021 NIBF featured the launching of the book Madagali authored by Dr. Wale Okediran, Secretary General of the Pan African Writers' Association.

== Guest of honour and theme ==
Year	Theme of the Year	Venue	Focus of Interest	Guest of Honour
2002	Publishing for Peace	International Conference Centre, Abuja	Promoting peace	Wole Soyinka
2003	Women Empowerment Through Publishing	Le Meridien Eko Hotel, Lagos	Women Empowerment	
2004	Book Trade Across Boundaries	Multi-purpose Hall, University of Lagos	Trading	Dirk Koehler
2011	Technology and the Future of the Book: Implication for the African Book Industry	Afe Babalola Auditorium, University of Lagos	New Technology Application	Lateef Jakande and Oyewusi Ibidapo-Obe
2012	The State of Infrastructural Development in Africa and the Future of the Book Trade	Multi-purpose Hall, University of Lagos	Infrastructural Development	
2014	Emergence of E-book and the Survival of Physical Book in Africa	Multi-purpose Hall, University of Lagos	Promoting E-books	
2015	African Youth Empowerment through Book for sustainable National Development	Multi-purpose Hall, University of Lagos	Youth Empowerment	Prof. Ismail Junaidu
2018	Networking – A Sustainable Vehicle for Dynamism and Survival of Book Business in Africa.	Jelili Adebisi Omotola Hall, University of Lagos	Networking Application	Dr. Lola Akande
2019	Optimising New Technology in Book Development and Distribution for the Promotion of Book in Africa	Jelili Adebisi Omotola Hall, University of Lagos	Utilizing Technology Book Development and Distribution	Hameed Bobboyi
2020	Information Technology as a Panacea for the Book Industry Sustainability Amidst COVID-19 Pandemic	Virtual (Online )	Application of Information Technology	Huago Setzer
2021	Awakening the Giant in Women for the Growth of the Book Ecosystem	Harbour Point Event Centre, Victoria Island, Lagos	Women	Bodour Al-Qasimi

== Sponsors and supporters ==
The Nigeria International Book Fair is in collaboration with the Nigeria Book Fair Trust. The festival is also sponsored by several institutions and agencies such as:

- Nigerian Educational Research and Development Council
- Nigerian Copyright Commission
- Fidelity Bank
- Quarterfold Printabilities
- United Bank for Africa
- Association of Nigerian Authors (ANA)
- Nigerian Publishers Association
- Chartered Institutes of Professional Printers of Nigeria
- International Publishers Association
- Nigerian Library Association
