= Lagos Games Festival =

Festival in Lagos

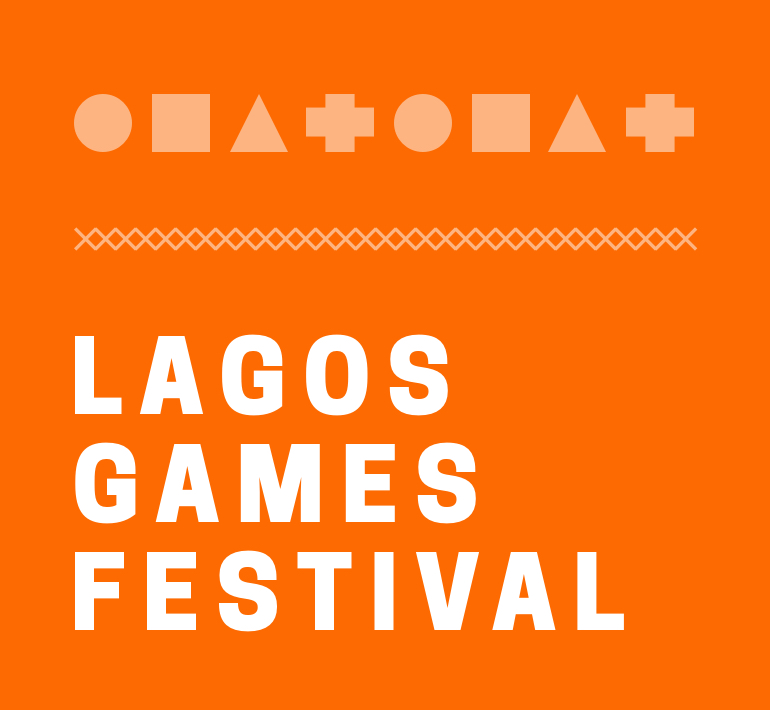
- Lagos Games Festival
- Status: Active
- Date: Easter weekend
- Frequency: Annual
- Location: Lagos, Nigeria
- Country: Nigeria
- Years active: 2019–present
- Founder: Shina Charles Memud
- Website: www.lagosgamesfestival.com

The Lagos Games Festival is an annual one-day games and arts festival that takes place in Lagos, Nigeria. Founded by Shina Charles Memud, it was created with the aim of promoting gaming culture, as well as building business opportunities for the gaming industry. The festival provides a venue where everyone can experience local and international games and for live tournaments, competitions and musical acts to perform. The festival (LGF) is kid-friendly and open to parent or group of people. There are outdoor activities, local vendors, and artisans to make the event very lively.

== History ==
The Lagos Games Festival is produced by DoingSoon. The maiden edition (2019) of the Lagos Games Festival took place at Tafawa Balewa Square (TBS), Lagos State. April 20th 2019.
