= Imo Awka Festival =

Ancient cultural event

Imo Awka festival
- Language: Igbo

Origin
- Meaning: Local Wrestling
- Region of origin: Igbo Region, Nigeria

Imo Awka festival (also known as the Imo Oka or Imoka festival) is an annual two-week festival celebrated in May by the people of Awka to venerate their gods. The Imo-Oka shrine is denoted by the special white-bellied monkey, widely respected and revered as the messengers of the shrine.

== History ==
The Imo Awka festival emerged from the worship of Imo or Imoka, the greatest female deity revered in Awka. The festival can be traced to ancient times, when the Awka people were frequently attacked and threatened by their neighbours. One of their oppressors was King Okoli Ijeoma of Ndikelionwu, who planned to invade their land. After learning of the planned invasion, the elders of Awka sent delegates to Akoto, a land known to be full of potent herbal doctors, to invite one of them to develop a charm that would fortify the Awka warriors. They returned with a renowned herbal doctor named Okoyeke. He prepared the charm to fortify their warriors but warned them that the charm must be venerated by the community to become effective. The Imoka is described as a protective medicine that aid them to fight their enemies. Monkeys were dedicated to the Imoka deity because when Nwafia people laid siege to attack the people of Awka, the Imoka gods sent his emissaries the monkeys in the forest to inform them of attack. They sense the danger and repelled the attack and defeated their enemies. Hence it became a taboo to kill or eat the meat of monkeys until date with severe consequences.

== Festivities ==
The Imo Awka festival is a two-week event that commence with the females paying homage to Imoka, dancing the Opu Eke dance. The first day of the festival is always on Avbo (Afor) market day and on the evening of the Oye market day preceding the feast, the trumpet is blown, the Abia drum beaten and Ikolo Imoka sounded to marshal in Egwu Imoka.

The festival features four major events: the Ede-Mmuo, Ogwu Oghugha, Eqwu Opu-Eke and Egwu Imo-Oka. The festival showcases several kinds of masquerades at the Imoka shrine.

One part of the festival, Nro-Nta, features beating of canes between two male groups. The men flog themselves until one refuses to beat back and surrenders. Although usually only men participate, women are allowed to watch. The event aims to test participants' strength and endurance of pain.

The festival concludes with visiting the Imo-Oka stream on the final day which is heralded by a heavy downpour of rain that falls in the late afternoon. In 2020, the festival was suspended due to the COVID-19 pandemic.
