= Nwonyo Fishing Festival =

Festival celebrated by the Ibi people in Taraba State, Nigeria

Nwoyo Fishing Festival
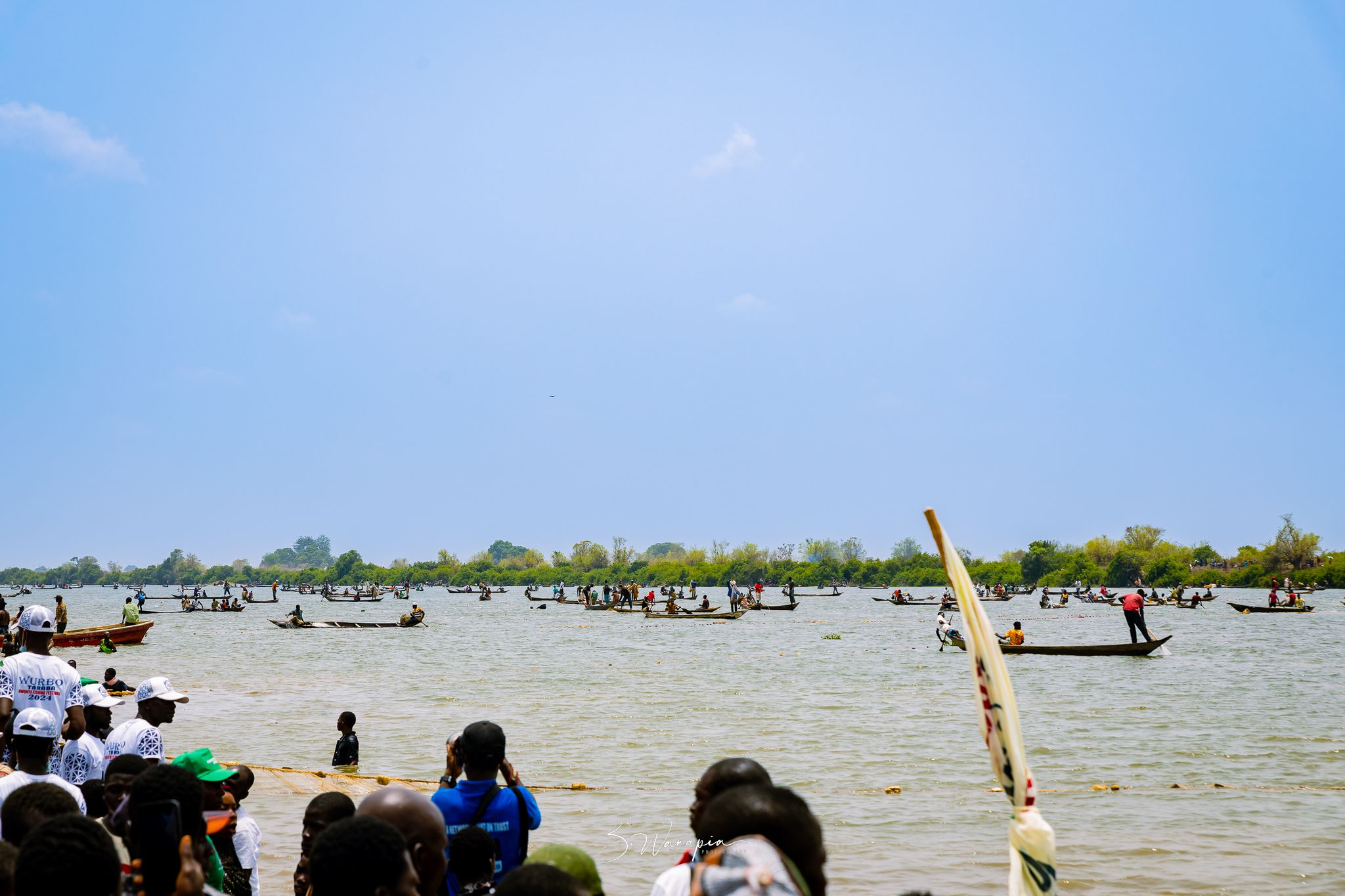
- Status: active
- Genre: festival
- Frequency: Annually
- Location: Ibi, Nigeria
- Coordinates: 08°10′52″N 09°44′39″E
- Country: Nigeria
- Organiser: Wukari Federation

The Nwonyo Fishing Festival is an annual festival celebrated by the Ibi people in Taraba State, Nigeria on a lake located five kilometres North of the Ibi community. During the festival, Ibi and its neighboring communities come together to fish and re-unite. The lake is said to be the largest in West Africa as it runs 15 kilometres to the Benue River.

== History ==
Nwonye Fishing Festival has been in existence for over 90 years and can be traced to Buba Wurbo in 1816, who founded Ibi community, The name Nwonyo means hide-out for huge and dangerous aquatic animals such as crocodiles, snakes, or hippopotamus. It is said that two myths describe the actual meaning of the word Nwonyo. The first myth means, “under the locust bean tree;” while the second says, “abode of the snake,” in Jukun language.

In the 1810s, the lake was primarily a source of fishing to the fishing/farming communities. Buba established a festival where neighboring communities come once a year to catch fish. The first public fishing festival was held during the reign of Agbumanu ll from (1903-1915) as the main participant are the Ibi themselves while Wukari and other neighboring communities came as spectators.

In 1943, the late Mallam Muhammadu Jikan Buba, Chief of Ibi appointed Mallam Muhammadu Sango as the custodian of the lake (Sarkin Ruwa) from (1931-1954), his duty was to secure the lake against any unauthorized fishing and to always declare the commencement of the yearly fishing festival, he patrol the lake regularly with his guards, this is done to allow the fishes grow well prior the next festival. as the years go by, in 1954 the level of participation increased.

In 1954, the festival had expanded and gained more recognition and spectators even from the Aku Uka of Wukari and his people, Mallam Adi Byewi, the Ukwe of Takum, Alhaji Ali Ibrahim, the Gara of Donga, Mallam Sambo Garbosa, and Mallam I. D. Muhammed who was the Officer-in-charge of the Wukari federation.

In 1973, the Wukari(no longer in existence) were the organizers of the festival with the help of the then Governor of Benue/Plateau State, Mr. D. Joseph Gomwalk. The festival this year was one of the best and a huge success that brought the festival to limelight, it was fully consisted of water and traditional sports. Important personnel were present, Governor of Benue/Plateau, Mr. Joseph Gomwalk and the then Col. Theophilus Danjuma, Col. M. D. Jega (1978), Brigadier A.R.A. Mahmud (1979) and the Governor of the defunct Gongola State Alhaji Abubakar Barde.

The festival at this point started to record some significant progress, from this time biggest fish catch were recorded and the biggest catch belong to “Sarkin Ruwa”. In 1970, the biggest catch weighed 60 pounds; in 1971 “Sarki ruwa” the biggest catch weighed 175 pounds; and in 1973, the biggest catch weighed 124 pounds.

By 2008, the festival was re-introduced as an International Fishing and Cultural Festival by Governor Danbaba Danfulani Suntai. In November the same year, the governor established the Taraba State Tourism Development Board (TSTDB), and the responsibility of staging and organizing the festival was automatically transferred to the Board.

In 2009, the festival was organised by the Board of the festival which it claimed was a successful outing that attracted dignitaries and tourists from far and near; and the event was capped with the biggest catch weighing 230kg. Notable participants included Sen. David Mark, Governor Danbaba D. Suntai and two of his colleagues: Admiral Murtala H. Nyako (rtd) of Adamawa State and Alhaji Aliyu Akwe Doma of Nasarawa State. Corporate Organizations like MTN and Zenith Bank supported the festival.

In 2024, the festival was reignited by the present Gov. Agbu Kefas where the man with the biggest catch went home with a refurbished Honda Hennessy as a grand prize. The key to the car was presented by Rtd. General TY Danjuma.

== Festivity ==
The Nwonyo festival is celebrated mostly in the dry season, when the lake will not be heavy. During the festival, other events besides fishing take places, such as swimming competitions, dancing, musical performances and singing competitions, a regatta, and masquerades. Canoes are used in the fish catch to prevent any attack from dangerous aquatic animals like crocodiles.
