= Durbar festival =

Annual festival in northern Nigeria

Gani Durbar festival
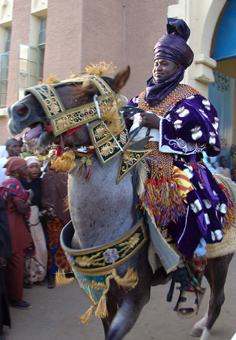
- Horseman at Kano Durbar (2006)
- Language: Hausa

Origin
- Meaning: Local Wrestling
- Region of origin: Northern Region, Nigeria

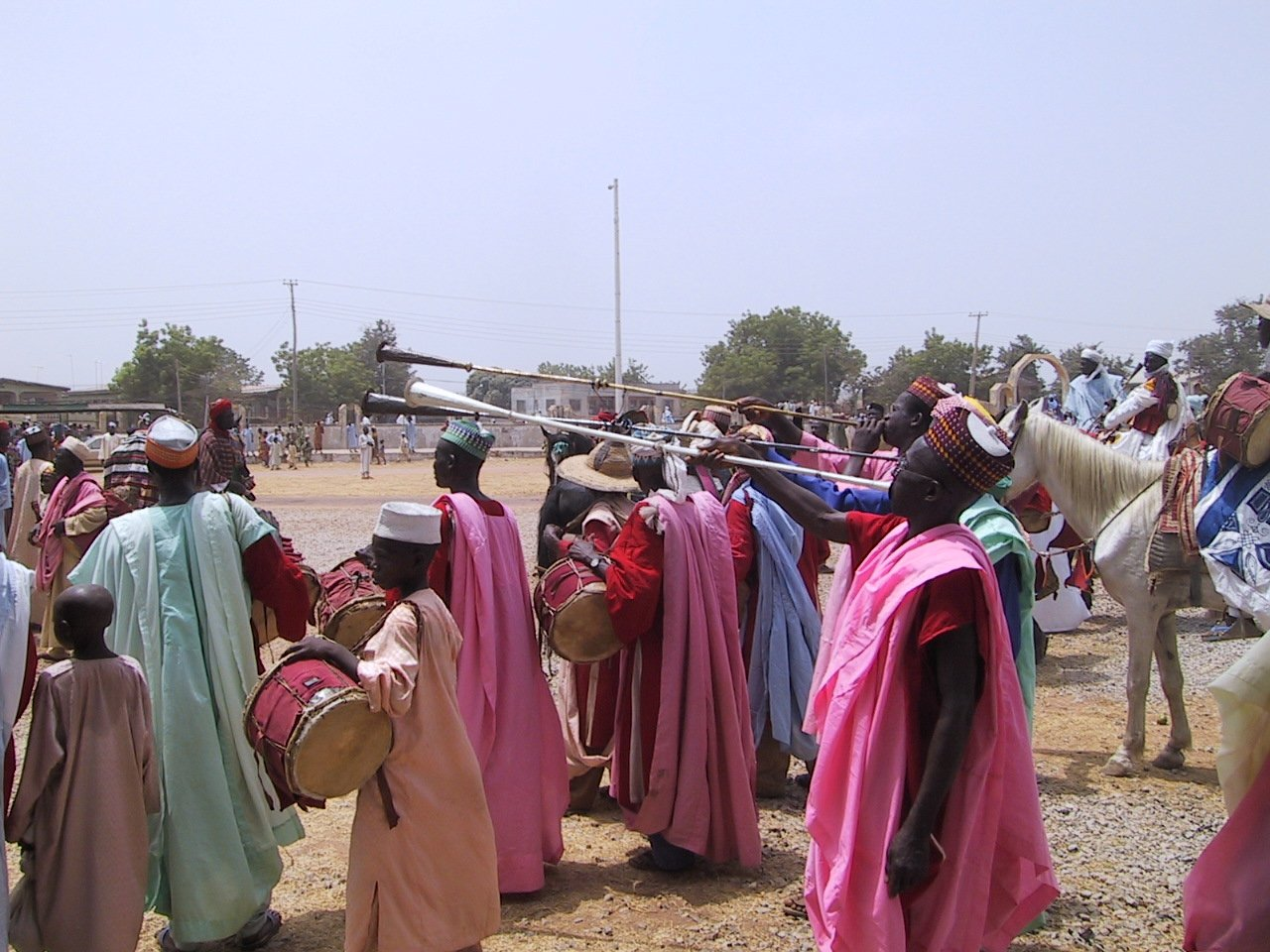
Bida Durbar (2001)

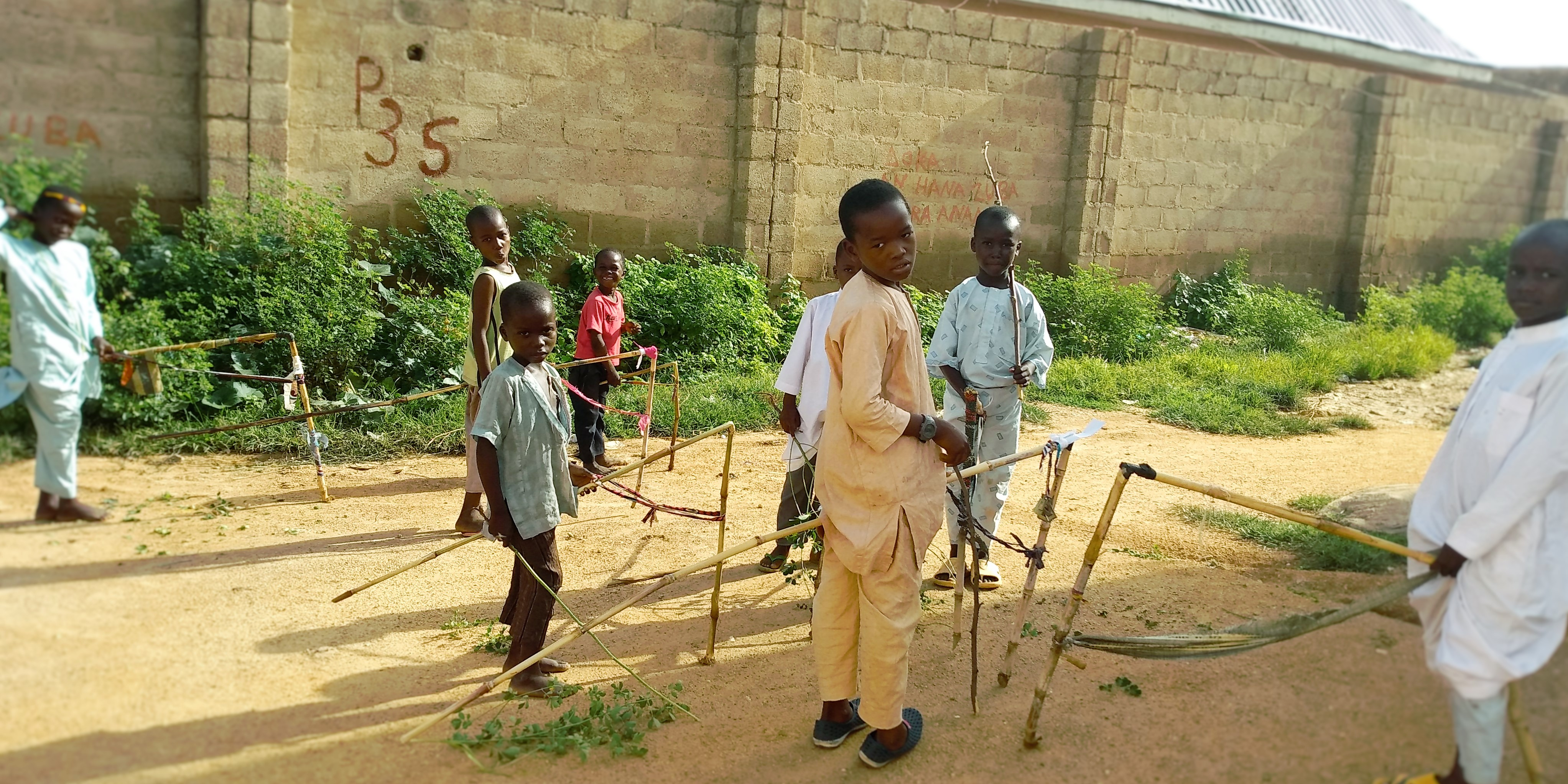
Children of Katsina mimicking the Durbar festival with sticks as horses.

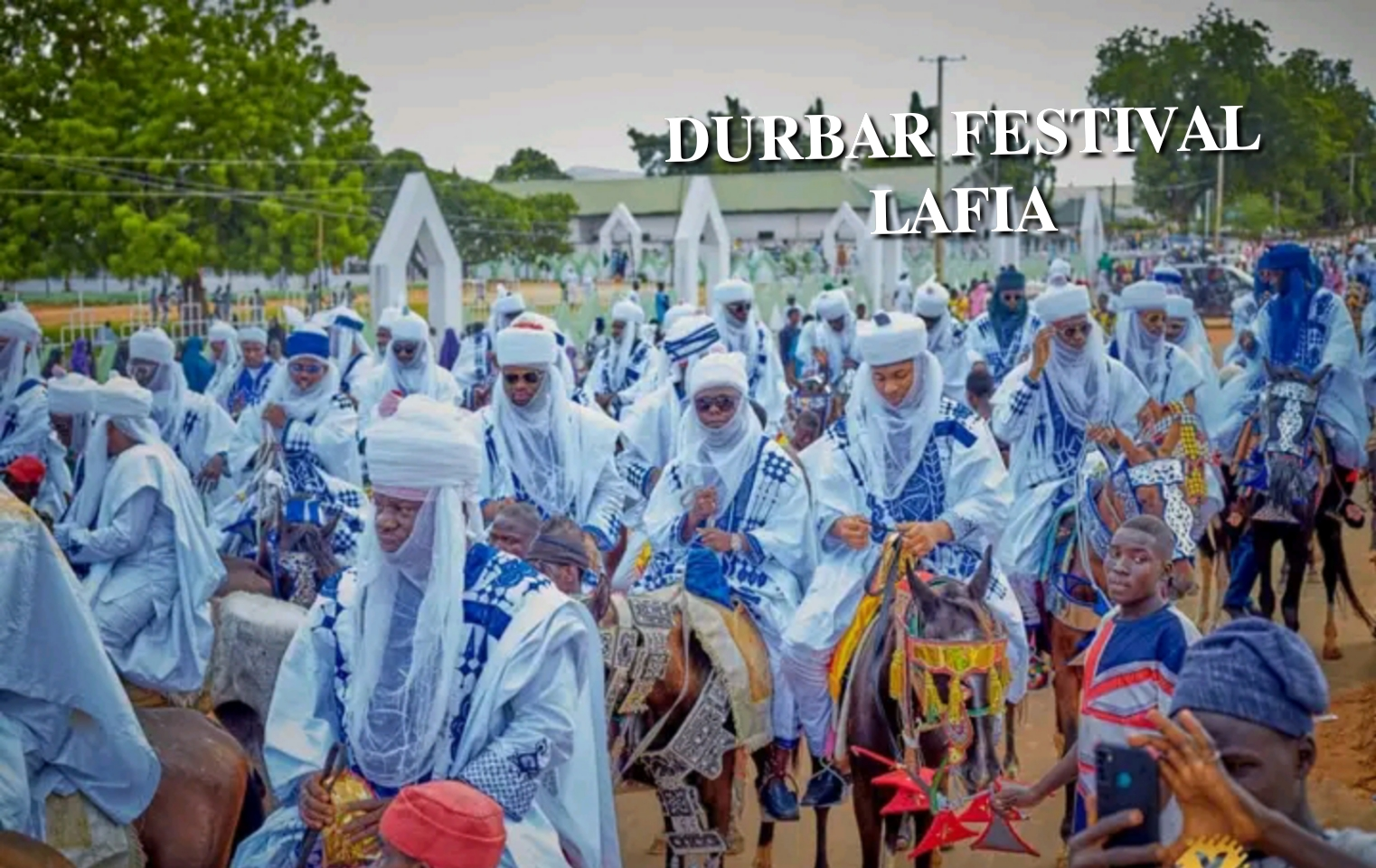
Durbar Festival Of Lafia during Salah celebrated 2022

The Durbar festival is an annual cultural, religious and equestrian festival, celebrated as a core part of Hausa culture in Arewa (Northern Nigeria). Durbar has existed for centuries in the Hausa Kingdoms, and is a paramount part of Hausa cultural rites, tradition, and history.

Durbar is performed in several northern cities of Nigeria, which include the original ancient Hausa Emirates are such as Kano, Katsina, Lafia, Gombe, Akko Emirate, Sokoto, Zazzau, Bauchi, Bida, and Ilorin. The festival is usually celebrated by these Emirates city following the end of Ramadan and also coincides with the Muslim festivities of Eid al-Adha and Eid al-Fitri.

It begins with prayers at dawn, followed by a colourful mounted parade of the Emir and his retinue of horsemen, musicians, and artillerymen. At the Durbar festivals noblemen travel to pay homage to the Emir and reaffirm their loyalty to their various emirates.

The festival dates back to over 200 years ago when horses were first used in warfare in Kano, the largest city in Northern Nigeria and former capital of the Kingdom of Kano. The Kano durbar festival is a four-day extravaganza of opulence, horsemanship, and street parades.

== History ==
=== Pre-colonial era ===
The Jahi race is the Durbar's centrepiece and the Hawan Daushe's final item on the programme. Several horse riders in the emirate charge full speed towards the emir, then abruptly stop when they approach him and wave their sword or flag before exiting. The Emir and his entourage ride through a number of quarters housing historically significant families before returning to the palace via the Kofar Kudu gate for the Jahi - the horsemen's salute. The Palace guards march into position after the Jahi and fire several gunshots into the air, signaling the end of the Hawan Daushe Durbar.

Hawan Sallah – the Festival Riding, followed by Hawan Daushe, Hawan Nassarawa, and Hawan Doriya. The most impressive aspect of the Durbar celebration is the Hawan Daushe, which also includes the "Jahi", which attracts viewers from all over the world.

The Hawan Daushe began as the Emir and his entourage ride out of Gidan Rumfa – the Emir's Palace, past Kofar Kwaru to Babban Daki – the palace of the Queen Mother, where he pays tribute to his mother.

In December 2024, the festival was recognized by UNESCO as an Intangible cultural heritage.

== See also ==
- Festivals in Nigeria
