= First Myanmar Investment =

- Traded as: YSX: FMI
- ISIN: MM0000100006
- Founded: 3 July 1992
- Founder: Serge Pun
- Headquarters: 380 Bogyoke Aung San Road, Pabedan Township, Yangon, Myanmar
- Key people: Linn Myaing (COO)
- Owner: Serge Pun
- Parent: Serge Pun & Associates
- Subsidiaries: Yoma Bank
- Website: fmi.com.mm

First Myanmar Investment (also abbreviated FMI) is a major Myanmar investment company founded in 1992 as one of Myanmar's first publicly traded companies. It is a subsidiary of Serge Pun & Associates. The company's headquarters are located in Pabedan Township, Yangon.

Real estate contributes to 87% of FMI's revenue. FMI owns 3 major properties in Yangon, namely FMI City, Star City, and FMI Center.

== Subsidiaries ==
- Yoma Bank
