= List of bank runs =

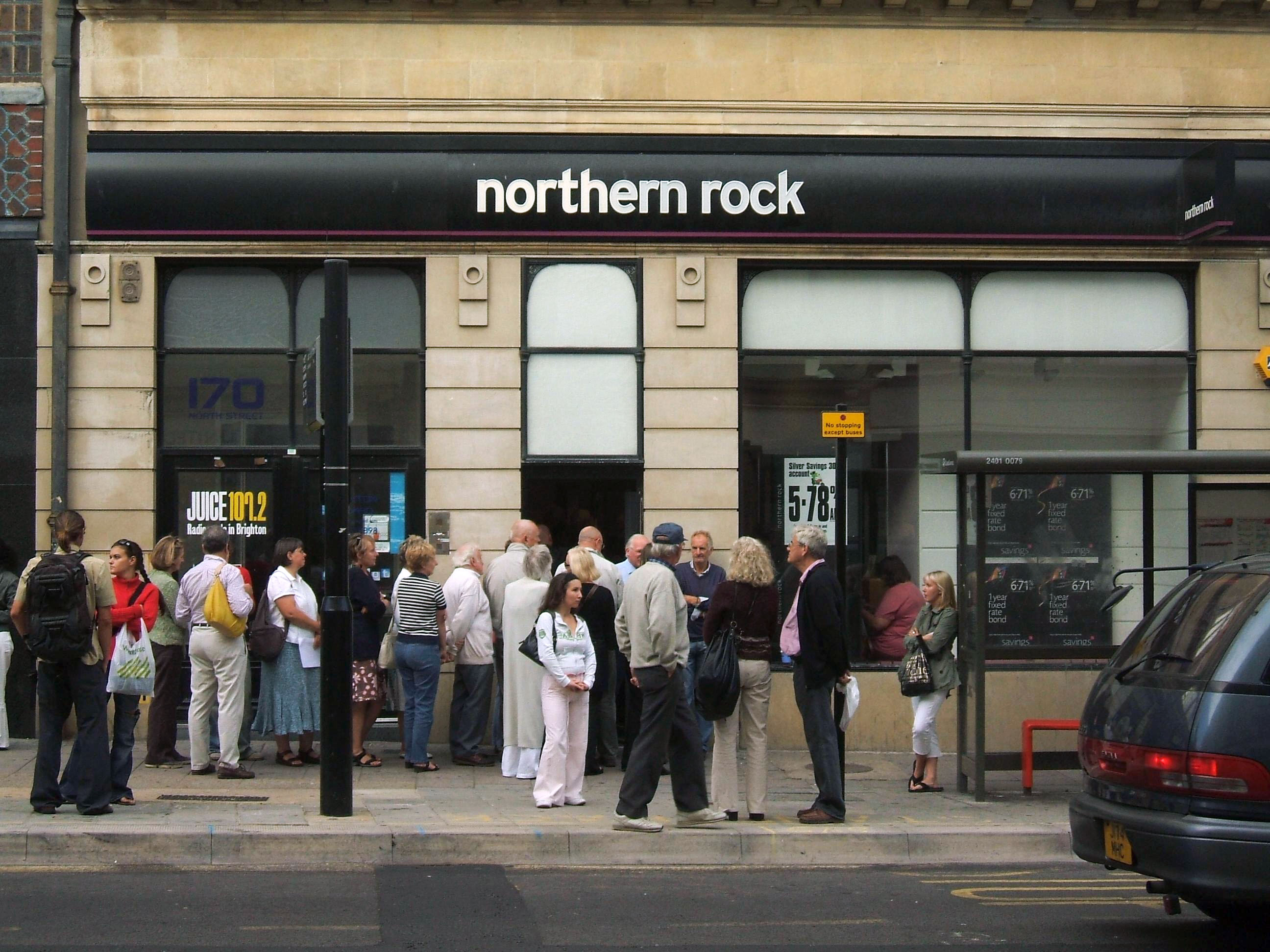
2007 run on Northern Rock, a UK bank

This is a list of bank runs. A bank run occurs when a large number of bank customers withdraw their deposits because they believe the bank might fail. As more people withdraw their deposits, the likelihood of default increases, and this encourages further withdrawals. This can destabilize the bank to the point where it faces bankruptcy.

== 17th century ==
- In 1635, the Nuremberg Banco Publico declared bankruptcy. The city council reorganized the bank later that year to restore payments and strengthen oversight.
- In 1664, Johan Palmstruch’s Stockholm Banco closed operations after being unable to give back customer money. Palmstruch had originally been granted permission by the Crown of Sweden to start the bank in 1656, and in 1661, it became the first in Europe to issue banknotes. As lending rose rapidly, the value of the notes fell, leading to the bank’s failure in 1664. Palmstruch was imprisoned, while the Crown took over the institution and reorganized it as Riksens Ständers Bank, the national bank of Sweden, operated by the parliament.

== 18th century ==
- In December 1704, the Bank of Scotland was hit by a severe run as rumors and the Darien aftermath drained its coin reserves. On December 18th, it suspended payments, but the Scottish government intervened to ensure interest payments were met. The Bank resumed payments in May 1705.

== 19th century ==
- During the 1832 Days of May, a deliberate campaign to derail the Duke of Wellington's attempts to block the Great Reform Bill saw the public drain 30% of the Bank of England's gold reserves under the rallying cry "Stop the Duke, go for gold!".
- In 1866, Overend, Gurney and Company suffered a bank run. It incorporated as a limited liability company in 1865, but with poor railway stock prices, it suffered losses. Assistance from the Bank of England was refused, and payments were suspended on 10 May 1866. A panic ensued. The town's people were disappointed that they couldn't get their money from the banks.
- Many bank runs occurred during the Panic of 1893.

== 1900s ==
- Many bank runs occurred during the Panic of 1907

== 1920s ==
- The Shōwa Financial Crisis was triggered in January 1927 when the Bank of Japan proposed to redeem discounted bonds it had issued to overextended banks in the wake of the Great Kantō earthquake. The news resulted in rumors that banks holding such bonds would go bankrupt. The ensuing bank runs led to the fall of 37 banks across the Empire of Japan and the resignation of Prime Minister Wakatsuki Reijirō.

== 1930s ==
Thousands of bank runs occurred during the Great Depression.

== 1970s ==
- In 1973, Toyokawa Shinkin Bank incident in Japan: in December of that year, a bank run occurred on Toyokawa Shinkin Bank because of a rumor that the bank will go into bankruptcy.

== 1990s ==
- In early 1994 thousands of clients rushed to Spain to withdraw their money. Banesto was taken into control by the Bank of Spain when they discovered a 450,000 million Pesetas (€2,704 million) equity hole in bank's finances.
- Between 1997 and 1999, several bank runs happened at MBf Finance Berhad in Malaysia, the biggest finance company in the country during that time. Many of the finance company's 120 branches saw runs on their deposits, totalling about 17 billion Ringgit (US$4.49 billion). Bank Negara Malaysia (the Malaysian central bank) took control of MBf Finance Berhad in 1999.

== 2000s ==
- In 2001, during the Argentine economic crisis (1999-2002), a bank run and corralito was experienced in Argentina. There are various theories into the cause. This contributed towards the bank runs in neighbouring Uruguay during the 2002 Uruguay banking crisis.
- In 2003, during the 2003 Myanmar banking crisis, bank runs on major private banks of Myanmar, such as Asia Wealth Bank and the Yoma Bank Ltd took place
- In early August 2007, the American firm Countrywide Financial suffered a bank run as a consequence of the subprime mortgage crisis.
- On 13 September 2007, the British bank Northern Rock arranged an emergency loan facility from the Bank of England, which it claimed was the result of short-term liquidity problems. The resulting bank run was not the traditional form, where depositors withdraw money in a snowball effect, leading to a liquidity crisis; instead, it occurred after news reports of a liquidity crisis that was not a bank run. The resulting financial crises ended with the nationalisation of Northern Rock.
- On Tuesday, 11 March 2008, a bank run began on the securities and banking firm Bear Stearns. While Bear Stearns was not an ordinary deposit-taking bank, it had financed huge long-term investments by selling short-maturity bonds (Asset Backed Commercial Paper), making it vulnerable to panic on the part of its bondholders. Credit officers of rival firms began to say that Bear Stearns would not be able to make good on its obligations. Within two days, Bear Stearns's capital base of $17 billion had dwindled to $2 billion in cash, and Bear Stearns told government officials that it saw little option other than to file for bankruptcy the next day. By 07:00 Friday, the Federal Reserve decided to lend Bear Stearns money, the first time since the Great Depression that it had lent to a nonbank. Stocks sank, and that day JPMorgan Chase began an effort to buy Bear Stearns as part of a government-sponsored bailout. The deal was arranged by Sunday in an effort to calm markets before overseas markets opened.
- On 11 July 2008, U.S. mortgage lender IndyMac Bank was seized by federal regulators. The bank relied heavily on higher cost, less stable, brokered deposits, as well as secured borrowings, to fund its operations and focused on stated income and other aggressively underwritten loans in areas with rapidly escalating home prices, particularly in California and Florida. A highly stressed institution, IndyMac's capital was being lost to downgrades as the poor quality of their book was revealed. Regulators at the Office of Thrift Supervision (OTS) had allowed the bank to misstate its financial condition, avoiding regulatory intervention. On June 26, Sen. Charles E. Schumer released to the media letters he sent to the regulators, which warned the bank might not be viable. In the days following the release, depositors pulled out approximately 7.5% of the bank's deposits. IndyMac and the OTS regulators who had allowed the bank backdate its books blamed Schumer's letters for the bank's demise. These regulators resigned or were fired amidst a Treasury Department investigation. IndyMac's failure is expected to cost the FDIC more about $9 billion. Uninsured depositors have lost an estimated $270 million.
- On September 15, 2008, Lehman Brothers, the 4th largest investment bank, filed for bankruptcy. The clients did a classic bank run, because the company had over $40 billion in assets in 2008.
- On 25 September 2008, the Office of Thrift Supervision was forced to shut down Washington Mutual, the largest savings and loan in the United States and the sixth-largest overall financial institution, on a Thursday due to a massive run. Over the previous 10 days, customers had withdrawn $16.7 billion in deposits. Normally, banks are seized on Fridays to allow the FDIC the weekend to prepare the failed bank for takeover by another bank. However, WaMu's size led regulators to shut it down on a Thursday.
- On 26 September 2008, Wachovia, the fourth-largest bank in the United States, lost $5 billion in deposits—about one percent of its total deposits—when several large customers (mostly businesses and institutional investors) drew down their accounts below the $100,000 limit for FDIC deposit insurance. This practice is known in banking circles as a "silent run". The Office of the Comptroller of the Currency and the FDIC were both concerned that Wachovia wouldn't have enough short-term funding to open for business on 29 September—which would have resulted in a failure dwarfing that of WaMu just a day earlier. They pressured Wachovia to put itself up for sale over the weekend. Initially, Wachovia was to sell its commercial banking operations to Citigroup, but eventually the entire company was sold to Wells Fargo.
- On 6 October 2008, Landsbanki, Iceland's second largest bank, was put into government receivership. The Icelandic government used emergency powers to dismiss the board of directors of Landsbanki and took control of the failed institution. Prime Minister Geir Haarde also rushed measures through parliament to give the country's largest bank, Kaupthing, a £400m loan. In addition, Iceland pleaded with Russia to extend 3bn in credit as western countries refused to help. With over 5bn in savings held by Britons in Landsbanki, the Icelandic collapse threatened private citizens in the United Kingdom as well as companies in Iceland.
- October 2009 bank run on DSB Bank in the Netherlands after bank run caused by Pieter Lakeman.

== 2010s ==
- On 11 December 2011, a rumor was spread via Twitter that the Swedish banks Swedbank and SEB were having "problems" and there was a lesser hysteria in Latvia. People emptied their accounts, and according to local media there were long lines of people at the automated teller machines. On December 12 the authorities started an investigation to locate the cause of the rumors, and the spokesman for Swedbank said that the situation seemed to be calming down.
- On 24 March 2014, Jiangsu Sheyang Rural Commercial Bank in Yancheng, China suffered a three-day bank run after rumors of the bank turning down a cash withdrawal transaction emerged. Supposedly, some branches remained open for 24 hours for the duration of the bank run, and tellers stacked cash behind teller windows to calm and reassure depositors.
- On 20 June 2014, Corporate Commercial Bank in Bulgaria has been put under special surveillance by the central bank after one-week bank run, triggered by accusation of 3 far-rеlated to the bank persons for attempted murder of Delyan Peevski, a media mogul and politician. The accusation for attempted murder had been withdrawn shortly after by the prosecution. The bank stayed closed until November 6 when the Bulgarian central bank (BNB) announced that Corporate Commercial Bank has accumulated massive losses which brought the capital to a negative value and automatically revoked its banking license. One week later (June 27), First Investment Bank suffered a one-day bank run after TV interviews by several politicians that triggered panic among the population. However, the government delivered financial aid to First Investment Bank in the next days, and the bank resumed its operations.
- Starting on 19 April 2017, Home Capital Group in Canada started to suffer a bank-run on its deposits after an Ontario Securities Commission report was filed that had accused the subprime lender of deceiving its investors in 2015 with its lending practices. As of early May 2017, the bank-run was ongoing. In order to attempt to allay investor, customer, and overall market fears, Home Capital Group had begun to sell off separate business units of its company. As a result of the long lasting bank runs, the company had lost more than 90% of its high-interest savings deposits. Home Capital Group had also lost more than 10% of its workforce during this long lasting bank-run, which was originally caused from the report by the Ontario Securities Commission in regard to the company's lending practices.
- On 13 May 2019, a false rumour spread via a WhatsApp post led to a run on the bank at Metro Bank branches in the United Kingdom. The rumour falsely claimed that Metro Bank was going out of business due to the real falling share prices and a false claim that the bank was going to appropriate all funds and safety deposit box contents which led to big queues to withdraw funds at their London branches. As of October 2019, the bank has resumed normal operations, but has lost up to 24% of its retail banking customers.

== 2020s ==
- On 25 February 2022, Russian Sberbank's branch in the Czech Republic experienced a bank run immediately following the Russian invasion of Ukraine as depositors sought to withdraw their funds over fears of instability and as a show of support for Ukraine. The Czech National Bank subsequently removed the bank's license to operate in the country, effectively shutting it down. The Czech Financial Market Guarantee System's deposit insurance fund, backed by the full faith and credit of the government of the Czech Republic, guaranteed refunds on deposits up to €100,000 (2.5 million Czech crowns) per account.
- On 27 February 2022, the sanctions against Russia during the 2022 Russian invasion of Ukraine and the removal of Russian banks from the SWIFT system led to a banking panic across multiple Russian banks.
- On March 8, 2023, Silvergate Bank announced liquidation, the first in the 2023 United States banking crisis.
- On 9 March 2023, a US$42 billion bank run on Silicon Valley Bank led to the closure of the bank by California and United States regulators, with FDIC-insured deposits assumed by the Deposit Insurance National Bank of Santa Clara. This is currently the biggest bank run in history.
- On March 12, 2023, regulators closed Signature Bank with over $110 billion in assets.
- On May 1, 2023, the FDIC announced the closure of First Republic Bank. Over $100 billion in uninsured deposits had been withdrawn.
- On 17 June 2025, Iran's IRGC and state-owned Bank Sepah suffered a destructive cyber-attack claimed by the Israel-linked hacktivist group Predatory Sparrow, which said it had destroyed the bank's data. Online banking, payment processing, and ATMs went offline nationwide, and some branches closed altogether; Iranian media reported customers locked out of their accounts and card transactions failing. As news spread, long queues formed at ATMs and branches while panicked depositors tried to withdraw cash; many machines quickly ran out of banknotes, promoting ad-hoc withdrawal caps and a three-day bank shutdown. This event may be classified as a first-of-a-kind cyber run.

== See also ==
- List of banking crises
- List of economic crises
- Bank failure (includes list)
