= Aik Htun =

Burmese businessman (born 1948)

- အိုက်ထွန်း
- Born: 21 October 1948 (age 78); Mongkai, Shan State, Burma
- Other names: Patrick Linn; Aik Htun, Aik Htun; Aik Tun
- Occupations: Managing Director and Chairman of Shwe Taung Development Co. Ltd, Vice Chairman of Asia Wealth Bank
- Children: Sandar Htun; Mi Mi Khaing; Aung Zaw Naing

Aik Htun (Burmese: အိုက်ထွန်း pronounced [aiʔ tʰʊ́ɰ̃]; Chinese: 李松枝; pinyin: Lǐ Sōngzhī; variously spelt Eik Tun, Eike Htun, and Aik Tun) is a Burmese businessman who is the managing director and vice chairman of the sister company of Olympic Construction Company, the Asia Wealth Bank, which was Burma's largest private bank until the banking crisis of 2003.

Aik Htun was born on 10 October 1948 in Mongkai in the Southern Shan States, Burma, the eldest of six children. He moved to Rangoon in 1970 and secured a job as a driver working for Nyunt Tin, a green tea wholesaler and operating the Shan Brothers tea shop. In 1972, he bought a biscuit shop on 16th Street and had expanded into the border business by 1984. Aik Htun established Olympic Company in 1991 with 3 other investors. The company now has interests in automobiles, marine products, timber, real estate, property development and finance.

Aik Htun also runs one of the country's largest construction businesses, the Olympic Construction Company, established in 1990 and primarily focuses on residential and hotel development in Yangon. He and his immediate family members are subject to European Union sanctions, from benefiting from close ties to the previous junta, the State Peace and Development Council. Olympic Construction company is renamed as Shwe Taung Group in 2004 after the money laundering accusation and drug links by the US department of Treasury against the affiliate Asia Wealth Bank. As of 2013 from now on, Aik Htun remain as the chairman of business group Shwe Taung group of companies that also include Shwe Taung construction co.ltd.

The US Secretary of Treasury also designated Asia Wealth Bank as financial institutions of primary money laundering concern and the department report notes that the Asia Wealth bank have been linked to narcotics trafficking organizations in Southeast Asia. These findings by the US treasury were only rescinded after the revocation of the bank licenses by the government of Myanmar, and not because of remedial actions by the bank.

== See also ==
- Shwe Taung Group
- Asia Wealth Bank
