= Serge Pun & Associates =

- Founded: 1983; 43 years ago
- Founder: Serge Pun
- Headquarters: Yangon, Myanmar
- Owner: Serge Pun
- Subsidiaries: First Myanmar Investment; Yoma Strategic Holdings; Yoma Bank

Serge Pun & Associates (also SPA Group) is a major Myanmar-based conglomerate, engaged in 8 core sectors with 25 subsidiaries, involved in automobiles, real estate, retail, luxury tourism, agriculture and financial services. Its flagship company, First Myanmar International (FMI), was established in 1992 as one of Myanmar's first publicly traded companies.

SPA Group was founded by Serge Pun, a Sino-Burmese, in Hong Kong in 1983 as an investment holding and operating company. The company was registered in Myanmar in 1991.

== Subsidiaries ==
- First Myanmar Investment
- Yoma Bank
- FMI Air
- SPA Motors
- Successful Goal Trading
- Convenience Prosperity Company
- Yoma Yarza Manufacturing
- Pun Hlaing International Hospital
- Pun Hlaing International School
- JJ-PUN Trading Company Limited
