= 2003 Myanmar banking crisis =

Burmese financial crisis

The 2003 banking crisis of Myanmar was a major bank run in private banking that hit Myanmar (Burma) in February 2003. It started with a decline in the trust for private financial institutions following the collapse of small financial enterprises and proliferating rumors about the liquidity of major private banks. Leading to a bank run on the Asia Wealth Bank, the crisis quickly spread to all major private banks in the country. It led to severe liquidity problems for private banks and scarcity of the kyat. Though exact data is not available, it is believed that the crisis caused major economic hardship for many in Myanmar.

== Background ==
Myanmar's banking system had been in a process of transition in the period leading up to the crisis. From the 1962 overthrow of the government by General Ne Win until 1990, state institutions dominated the financial sector in Myanmar. Only with the adoption of the Financial Institutions of Myanmar law by the State Peace and Development Council in 1990 were private banks allowed to form and operate in the country. By early 2003, there were 20 private banks in the country. However, many of these banks were relatively small. Five private banks dominated the field: Asia Wealth Bank, Yoma Bank, Kanbawza Bank, Myanmar Mayflower Bank and the Myanmar Oriental Bank. Though not all private banks grew considerably by international standards, the growth of the private banking sector and the share of the deposits in private banks increased in the 1990s and early 2000s. While private banks accounted for only about 10% of savings in 1994, by 2003, the amount increased to about 66%. Though state owned Myanmar Economic Bank had the most number of branches, in all other metrics private banks started to overshadow public banks.

However, while the importance of private banks in Myanmar did increase in this period, there were multiple indicators that suggested the private banks did not truly perform optimally. For example, outside of certain urban centres such as Yangon and Mandalay, the banking system did not penetrate the lives of the populace. For the majority of the population, keeping wealth in form tangibles (such as gold or other precious metals) and borrowing from private moneylenders were still the norm. Also, though entrance to the market was available after 1990, the banks still had to work under wide-ranging regulations, including ceilings on interest rates. The fact that these ceilings were below the inflation rate of Myanmar led to “schemes (especially in real estate) whose principle promise was to act as an inflation hedge,” which ultimately resulted in real estate price bubbles and financial instability even before the 2003 crises.

== Origins of the crisis ==
In the second half of 2002, many informal finance enterprises in the country started to go under. These enterprises were not authorized deposit taking institutions under the Financial Institutions of Myanmar Law, but nevertheless accepted deposits by using the loophole of naming the depositors “shareholders.” They promised investors considerably higher interest rates than what private banks were offering (usually around 10% per year). While these high rates, regularly reaching 3-4% per month, seemed hardly possible to return on a sustainable basis, large amount of investors used these entities nevertheless. More often than not, the enterprises depended on either highly speculative investments for the promised rate of return or even sometimes turned out to be not much more than ponzi schemes. Nevertheless, the collapse of the informal finance companies is considered one of the early triggers of the crises. Not only did some of the authorized banks experience direct financial loss because of exposure to these enterprises through lending and share investments, it also brought about distrust in the newly liberalized financial sector.

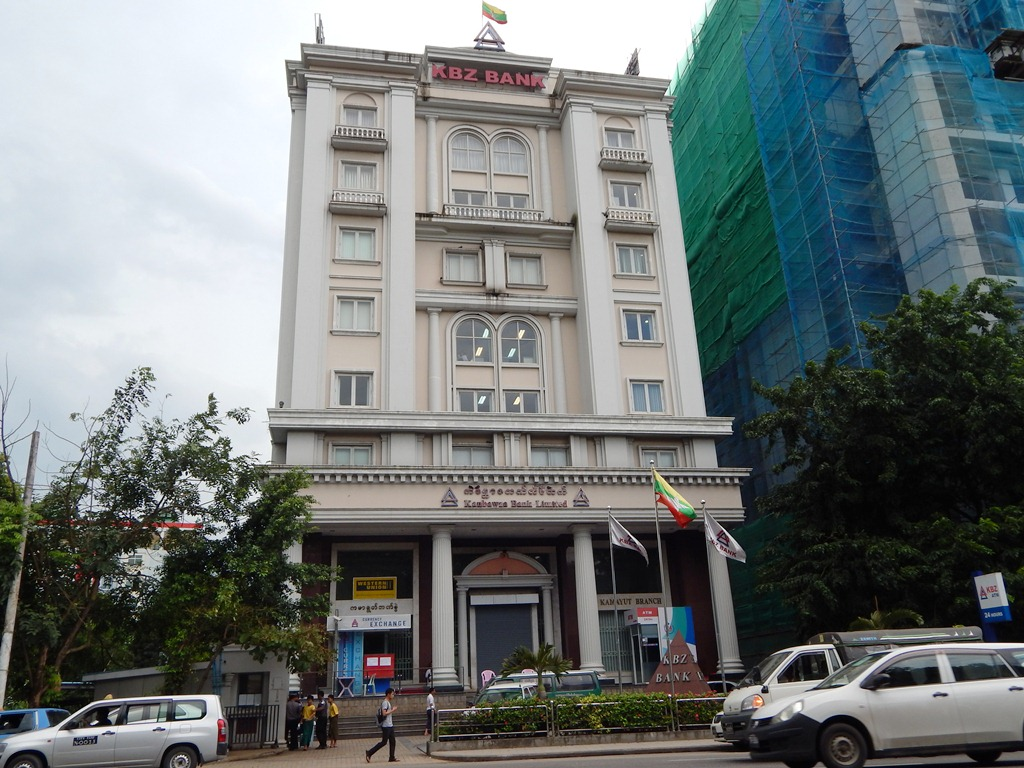
Kanbawza Bank

Another source of rumors and distrust that laid at the origins of the 2003 crises were allegations of money laundering against Myanmar banks. With the September 2001 terrorist attacks on the United States, the issue of money laundering gained prominence. In response to this, in May 2002, Myanmar adopted the Law to Control Money and Property Obtained by Illegal Means. This law addressed many concerns of the US State Department and initially lead to a flight of funds from banks in Myanmar. In fact, the situation got serious enough that the government had to assure the banks that they should not be threatened by the new law. Yet, even though the flight of funds did seem to decrease, rumors of large-scale withdrawals persisted. These rumors furthermore undermined the trust to the financial system and brought about fears regarding liquidity of the banks in the face of withdrawn funds.

Finally, on 1 February 2003, Finance and Revenue Minister Khin Maung Thein was permitted to retire without any additional explanation from the government. This incident coincided with the peak of fears regarding the independent finance companies’ instability. The Yangon-based business magazine Living Color also ran a report in its February edition that private banks are also giving out loans well beyond their existing capital. Article specifically alleged that Asia Wealth Bank, the largest private bank in the country, has 50 times more outstanding loans than its capital while Yoma Bank has about 30 times more than its revenues. Similarly, a rumor indicating that Asia Wealth Bank lost a significant amount of its investments in deals with a Chinese company also started circulating. All these issues led to rumors that major banks are on the verge of collapse and created the ground for the crises.

== Timeline ==
On February 6, fears about the private banks collapsing led to bank runs by customers to withdraw their funds. Starting with Asia Wealth Bank, the runs quickly spread to other private banks. As early as February 10, the situation got dire enough that Kyaw Kyaw Maung, the governor of Myanmar's Central Bank, held a press conference assuring that all 20 banks are in firm financial standing and have the backing of the Central Bank. However, this attempt was not enough to quell the consumer unrest. Different banks started to begin denying withdrawal requests and asked account holders to return after February 18. By February 12, reserves of Asia Wealth Bank dwindled to a point where the bank asked the Central Bank a security bond of 30 billion kyats (US$30 million.) Finally, on 15 February, Yoma Bank, one of the three banks in the country that have credit card services, suspended such services in the face of the crises.

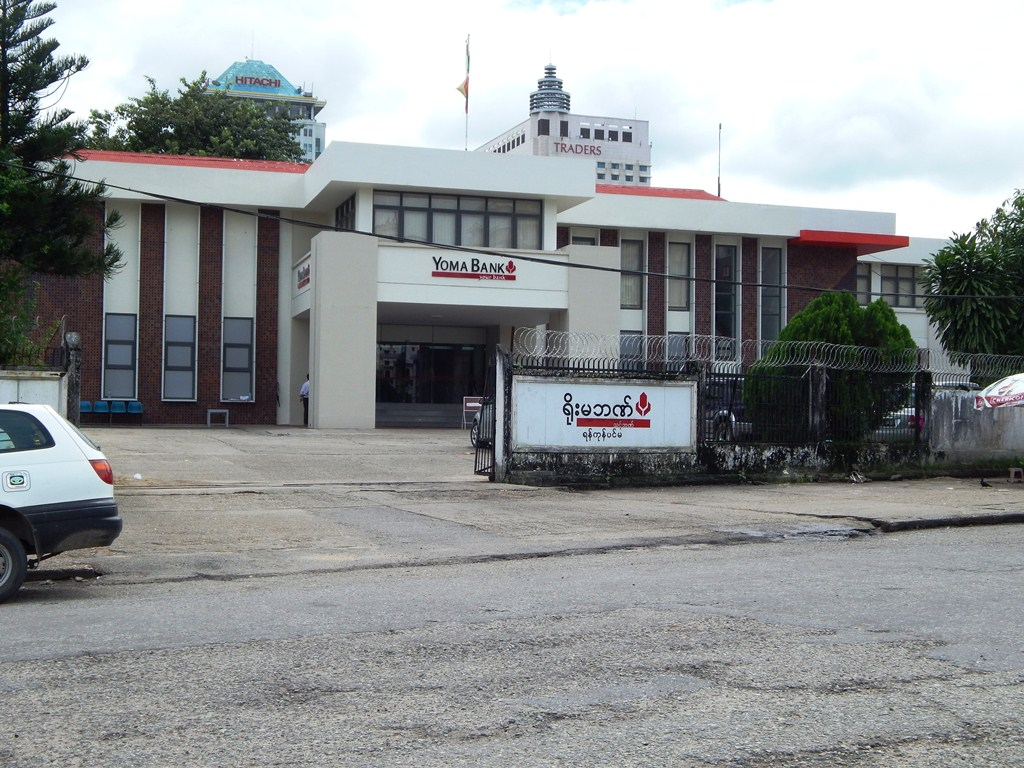
Yoma Bank, one of the three banks that had credit card services in 2003

With the financial situation getting worse, there were reports that the ruling party got increasingly sensitive about business reporting in the country, imposing a news blackout in an effort to stop the spread of panic among the public. The state-owned Kyemon newspaper ran a story that blamed the destructive elements abroad, such as the exiles, for the banking crises.

By February 17, all private banks started to impose a withdrawal limit of 500,000 kyat ($500) per customer per week in order to tackle the liquidity problem. Within a week, this limit got further tightened to 200,000 and 100,00 kyat for some banks. Universal Bank decreased this limit to 50,000 kyat per week by February 21. In response to the limits, large crowds began gathering in front banks demanding withdrawals. After a bank in Yangon's Thingangyun area was stoned by account holders, riot police was called upon to guard banks, while the traffic police tried to disperse the huge crowds outside of the Olympic Tower branch of Asia Wealth Bank. Soon, Asia Wealth Bank posted signs saying their branches are working in normal conditions, even though the restrictions were still in place.

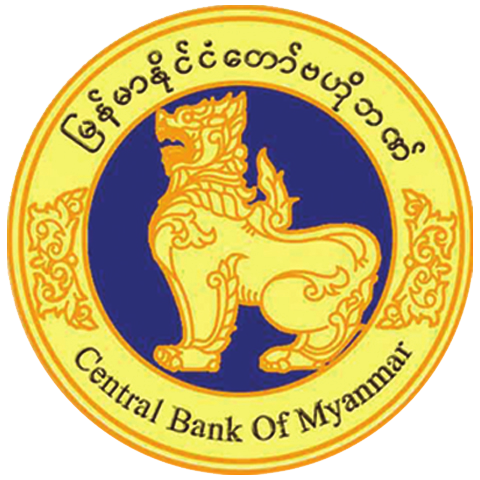
Central Bank of Myanmar seal

On February 20, several banks ordered their investors to repay about 20% to 25% of their loans to the bank within a few days. By some accounts, this was asked by the Central Bank of Myanmar. This led to further hardship for customers, where, in one geographic division, people who borrowed for purchasing homes were asked to return 25% of their loans back. Though there is no exact data on what followed, there is contemporary reporting that suggests people had to "sell assets or downgrade their business and lifestyles” in order to meet these loan calls. By February 25, some banks revised their earlier demands for 25% of the outstanding loans repayments to 50%. The Central Bank of Myanmar’s timetable initially required that all required repayments were to be paid by the end of March 2003. General Khin Nyunt, on March 29 said in a press conference that he “would like to urge those who have taken loans from the banks to strive to repay their debts speedily in consideration of those who have deposited money in the banks, and to ensure the long term interest of the banks and strengthen the national economy". However, the deadline later got pushed back to May 2003 as a lot of the recalled debt was not paid back. Even by the end of May, there were still repayment orders that were not fulfilled.

On February 21, the Central Bank pledged to assist private banks with a 25 billion kyat ($25 million) bailout, at 4% interest rate. The money was going to be shared between the three largest private banks: Asia Wealth Bank, Kanbawza Bank and Yoma Bank. This liquidity support represented about 3.5% of all deposits in these banks. However, according to the Irrawaddy Newspaper, this money have never actually arrived to these banks.

Though the reports on the crises have been limited outside of the country due to the media blackout, by the end of February, a Singapore-based business magazine wrote that they are watching the crises with concern and one firm has already closed down operations in Yangon. Yet, on February 24, Zaw Win Naing, the managing director of Kanbawza Bank said: “the problem we face can be worked out soon, and it is a temporary problem.” Yet, even by May 2003, the crises did not seem to dwindle and depositors had no greater ability to access their accounts. Three month into the banking crises, all three biggest banks were facing severe cash shortages. Yoma bank was reportedly selling its capital assets in order to raise liquidity.

== Outcomes ==
=== Value of the kyat ===
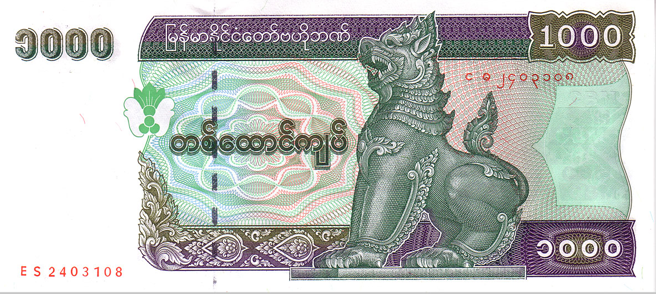
1000 kyat bill

Though in many instances banking and currency crises coincide, the value of the kyat appreciated during the banking crisis. With the currency losing value against the dollar before the crisis, reaching a low of 1100 kyat to $1, by February 20 the value of the kyat increased to 900 kyat per dollar (the black market rate). On March 18, moneychangers in Yangon reported that trading was happening at as low as 850 kyat

As the kyat was indispensable for everyday transactions for the people in Myanmar, there was a steady demand for it even before the crisis. With the crisis making kyat-denominated bank deposits overly risky and virtually worthless (due to frozen accounts and illiquidity of the banks), demand for kyat increased and supply of kyat decreased. The kyat increased in price as it became scarcer. Economist Elliot Turner also notes that this scarcity of kyat was indicative of systemic illiquidity in the entire system due to the banking crisis.

=== Economic hardship ===
With the withdrawal limits in place, and the other means of exchange used by banks such as cheques, remittance facilities, credit cards and electronic transfers of funds severely disrupted, the crisis had harmful effects on the real economy. On February 26, the Central Bank ordered all banks to cease any account transfers, further exacerbating the issue. Though the majority of people in Myanmar did not have bank accounts, almost all businesses had and used these funds to pay their employees. From the outset of the crisis, many workers and employers in Myanmar in market-related activities such as factories, fisheries and construction faced severe cuts in payments. There are reports that suggest many workers went unpaid for weeks or got laid off due to the crises. Similarly, contractors, transport providers for goods, suppliers and distributors were all affected by the crisis. On February 28, some traders were saying they were unable to make due payments to other merchants since their money remained tied in bank accounts. Even though some business account holders were allowed to make larger withdrawals to pay salaries in late February, small accounts and personal investments were still disrupted.

The Mizzima News Service reported on March 2 that bank closures in Tamu, close to the India-Burma border, had resulted in losses for the traders and the failure of payments in the area. This led to a meeting by border traders on March 13 in Tamu, discussing solutions to the ongoing problem. Burmese traders with India demanded that the government should deal with the crisis. Day-to-day operations of agricultural trading firms were also harmed, as the firms could not pay their current debt obligations. In mid-March, people in Yangon started to sell luxury items to meet their due payments to the banks. However, with the crisis ongoing, demand for goods was low and the prices of certain goods had to fall down as much as 50 per cent. According to the newspaper Irawaddy, the number of robberies in the area also increased due to the crisis. By May 2003, a secondary market of frozen bank accounts started to emerge, where account holders were selling their frozen accounts for about 60% to 80% of their face value, further increasing the financial losses for account owners.

== See also ==
- Economy of Burma
- List of banking crises
- List of bank runs
