= Telephone game =

Children's game

Telephone · Broken Telephone · Chinese Whispers
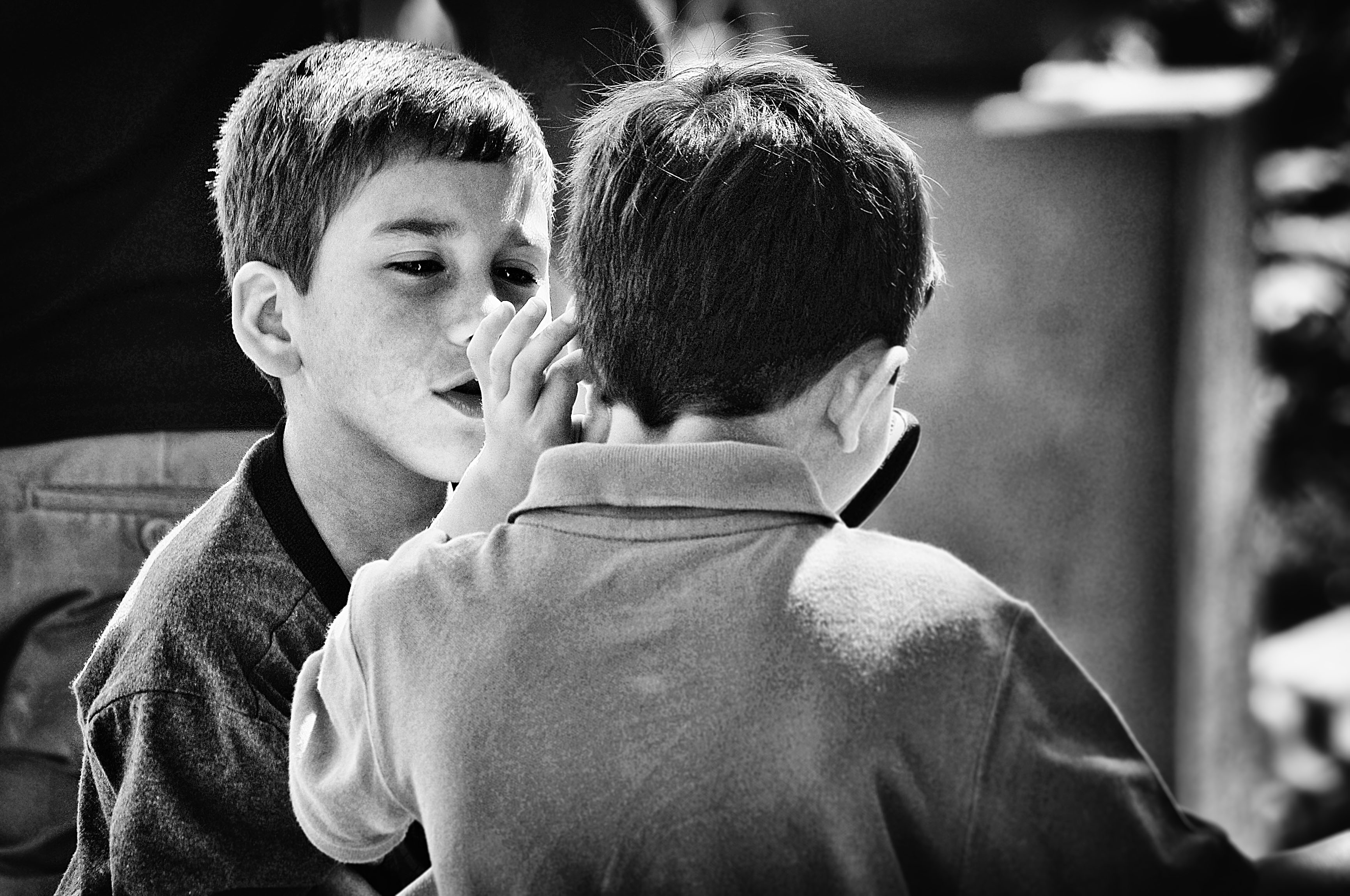
- Genres: Children's game, verbal game, party game
- Players: Three or more
- Setup time: None
- Playing time: User determined
- Chance: Medium
- Skills: Speaking, listening

Telephone (American English), Broken Telephone (Canadian English), or Chinese Whispers (some Commonwealth English), is an internationally popular children's game in which messages are whispered from person to person and then the original and final messages are compared. This sequential modification of information is called transmission chaining in the context of cultural evolution research, and is primarily used to identify the type of information that is more easily passed on from one person to another.

In a game of Telephone, players form a line or circle, and the first player comes up with a message and whispers it to the ear of the second person in the line. The second player repeats the message to the third player, and so on. When the last player is reached, they announce the message they just heard, to the entire group. The first person then compares the original message with the final version. Although the objective is to pass around the message without it becoming garbled along the way, part of the enjoyment is that, regardless, this usually ends up happening. Errors typically accumulate in the retellings, so the statement announced by the last player differs significantly from that of the first player, usually with amusing or humorous effect. Reasons for changes include anxiousness or impatience, erroneous corrections, or the difficult-to-understand mechanism of whispering.

The game is often played by children as a party game or on the playground. It is often invoked as a metaphor for cumulative error, especially the inaccuracies as rumours or gossip spread, or, more generally, for the unreliability of typical human recollection.

The telephone game has also been simulated using large language models (LLMs). Research indicates that AI systems exhibit a similar phenomenon: information gradually distorts as it passes through a chain of LLMs. This occurs when the same content is continuously refined, paraphrased, or reprocessed, with each output becoming the input for the next iteration.

== Etymology ==
=== United Kingdom, Ireland, Australia, and New Zealand usage ===
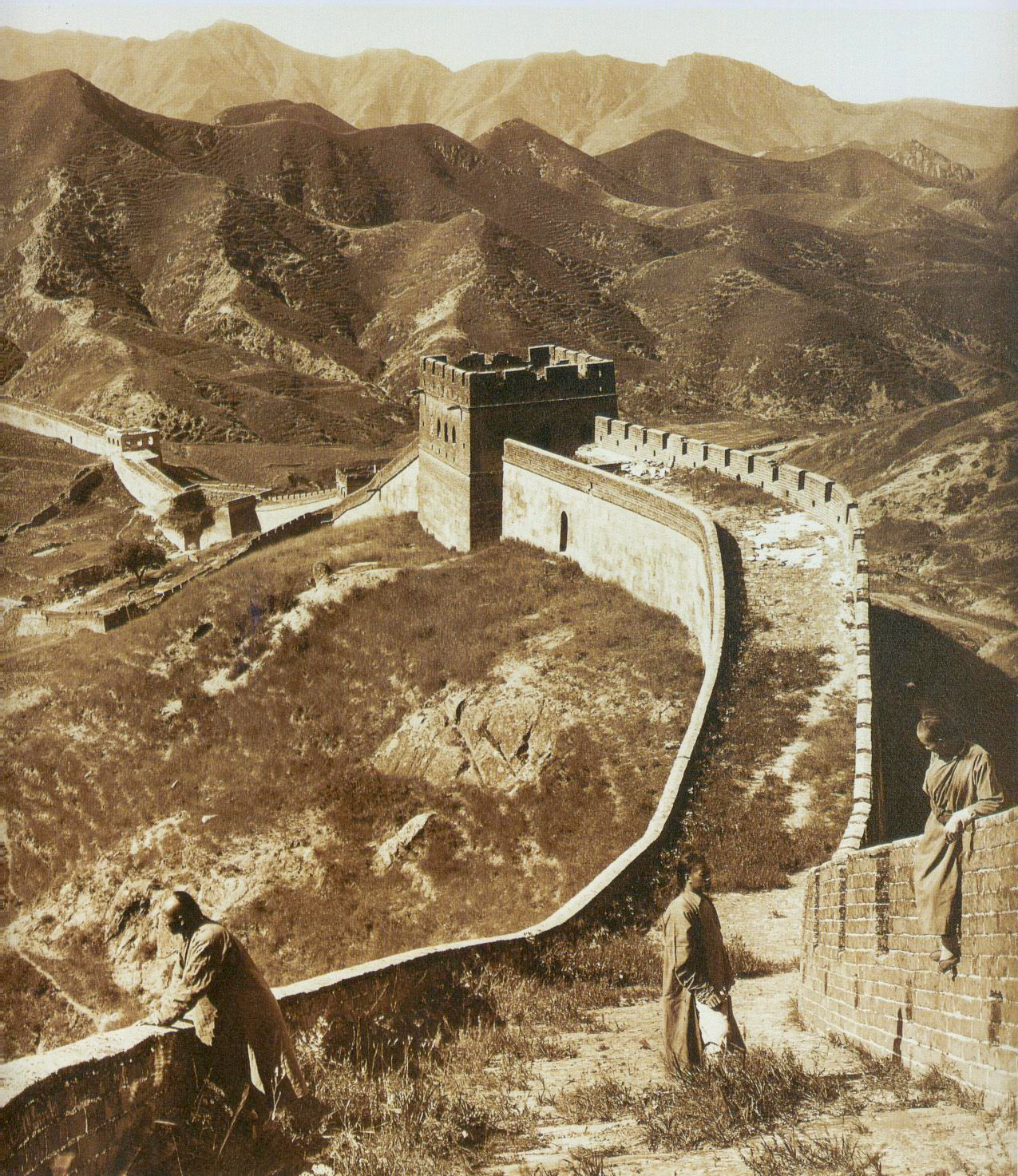
The Great Wall, one potential origin of the name "Chinese whispers"

In the UK, Ireland, Australia and New Zealand, the game is typically called "Chinese whispers"; in the UK, this is documented from 1964.

Various accounts have been suggested for naming the game after the Chinese, but there is no concrete explanation. One suggested account is a widespread British fascination with Chinese culture in the 18th and 19th centuries during the Enlightenment. Another account posits that the game's name stems from the supposed confused messages created when a message was passed verbally from tower to tower along the Great Wall of China.

Critics who focus on Western use of the word Chinese as denoting "confusion" and "incomprehensibility" look to the earliest contacts between Europeans and Chinese people in the 17th century, attributing it to a supposed inability on the part of Europeans to understand China's culture and worldview. In this view, using the phrase "Chinese whispers" is taken as evidence of a belief that the Chinese language itself is not understandable. Yunte Huang, a professor of English at the University of California, Santa Barbara, has said that: "Indicating inaccurately transmitted information, the expression 'Chinese Whispers' carries with it a sense of paranoia caused by espionage, counterespionage, Red Scare, and other war games, real or imaginary, cold or hot." Usage of the term has been defended as being similar to other expressions such as "It's all Greek to me" and "Double Dutch".

=== Alternative names ===
As the game is popular among children worldwide, it is also known under various other names depending on locality, such as Russian scandal, Russian gossip, Russian telephone, whisper down the lane, broken telephone, operator, grapevine, gossip, secret message, the messenger game, and pass the message, among others. In Turkey, this game is called kulaktan kulağa, which means "from (one) ear to (another) ear". In France, it is called téléphone arabe ("Arabic telephone") or téléphone sans fil ("wireless telephone"). In Germany the game is known as Stille Post ("quiet mail"). In Czechia, it is known as tichá pošta, also meaning "quiet mail". In Poland it is called głuchy telefon, meaning "silent call" or literally "deaf telephone (call)". In Medici-era Florence it was called the "game of the ear".

In North America, the game is known under the name telephone. Alternative names used in the United States include broken telephone, gossip, and rumors.

== Game ==
The game has no winner: the entertainment comes from comparing the original and final messages. Intermediate messages may also be compared; some messages will become unrecognizable after only a few steps.

As well as providing amusement, the game can have educational value. It shows how easily information can become corrupted by indirect communication. The game has been used in schools to simulate the spread of gossip and its possible harmful effects. It can also be used to teach young children to moderate the volume of their voice, and how to listen attentively; in this case, a game is a success if the message is transmitted accurately with each child whispering rather than shouting. It can also be used for older or adult learners of a foreign language, where the challenge of speaking comprehensibly, and understanding, is more difficult because of the low volume, and hence a greater mastery of the fine points of pronunciation is required.

== Notable games ==
In 2008, 1,330 children and celebrities set a world record for the game of Telephone involving the most people. The game was held at the Emirates Stadium in London and lasted two hours and four minutes. Starting with "together we will make a world of difference", the phrase morphed into "we're setting a record" part way down the chain, and by the end had become simply "haaaaa". The previous record, set in 2006 by the Cycling Club of Chengdu, China, had involved 1,083 people.

In 2017 a new world record was set for the largest game of Telephone in terms of the number of participants by schoolchildren in Tauranga, New Zealand. The chain involved 1,763 school children and other individuals and was held as part of Hearing Week 2017. The starting phrase was "Turn it down". As of 2022 this remained the world record for the largest game of Telephone by number of participants according to the Guinness Book of Records.

In 2012 a global game of Telephone was played spanning 237 individuals speaking seven different languages. Beginning in St Kilda Library in Melbourne, Australia, the starting phrase "Life must be lived as play" (a paraphrase of Plato) had become "He bites snails" by the time the game reached its end in Alaska 26 hours later. In 2013, the Global Gossip Game had 840 participants and travelled to all 7 continents.

== Telephone Pictionary ==
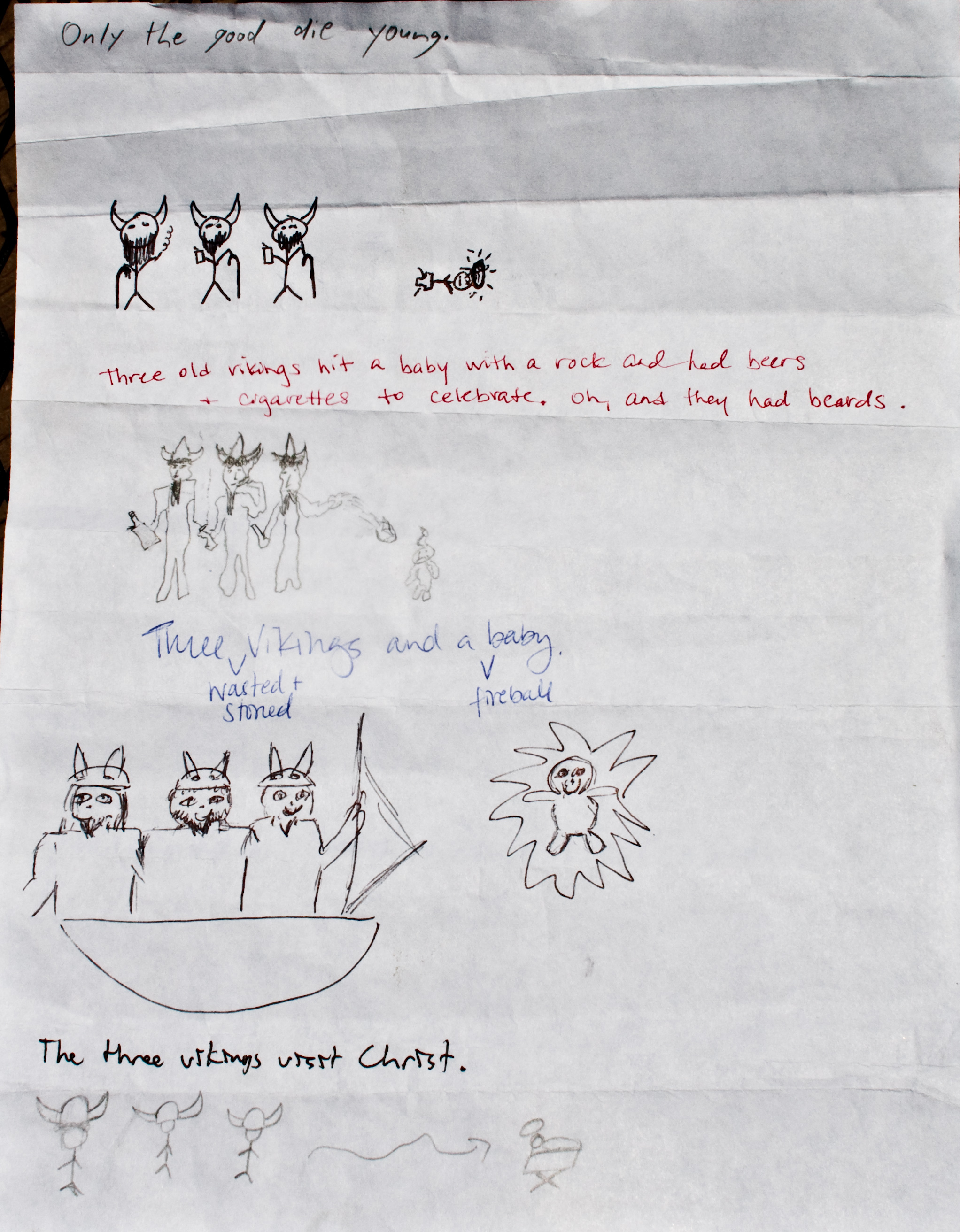
A game of Eat Poop You Cat, starting with "Only the good die young" and ending with "The three vikings visit Christ"

The pen-and-paper game Telephone Pictionary (also known as Eat Poop You Cat) is played by alternately writing and illustrating captions, the paper being folded so that each player can only see the previous participant's contribution.

=== Broken Picture Telephone ===
Broken Picture Telephone
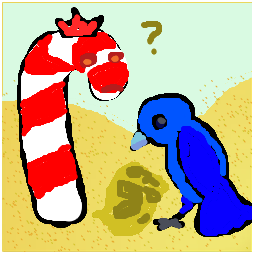
- Screenshot of a drawing round
- Developer: Alishah Novin
- Platform: Android, Browser, iOS
- Type: Cooperative, Drawing, Multiplayer, Text-based
- Website: brokenpicturetelephone.com

The previous player's text is presented side-by-side with the drawing interface (post-2013 version shown) in drawing rounds.

The game was first implemented online by Broken Picture Telephone (BPT), a collaborative multiplayer online drawing and writing game, in early 2007 by American indie developer Alishah Novin. It consists of at least 11 rounds in which players alternate between writing descriptions and creating drawings based on previous contributions. It had rave reviews and many server issues due to the amount of players trying to play.

Like Telephone, Broken Picture Telephone relies on the breakdown of communications for entertainment value. Broken Picture Telephone's gameplay involves a series of 11 or more rounds per game, in which each player can participate in only one round per game. The first and last rounds always require a text contribution; written-contribution turns alternate with drawing-contribution rounds. Whichever player is randomly selected to play round two creates a drawing based on the text provided in round one; the next randomly selected player writes a description of the drawing from round two; the round four player draws whatever the round three player described; and so on. For writing rounds, there is a character limit constraining possible submissions. For drawing rounds, the tools provided are rudimentary, consisting of eleven colors and a few brush sizes in the 2009 edition of the game. Each player has a maximum of ten minutes to submit their description or drawing. Games persist on the BrokenPictureTelephone.com site until finished, so that players can join a game hours or even days after it was begun. Until each game is concluded by the submission of its final text round, the full sequence of rounds is not visible to any site visitor, and when playing a round, players can see only the round immediately preceding their own. In order to deter inappropriate user behavior, players must register using a valid email address. Games with mature content are flagged as such by users—either the player who added the mature content, or any other user who views the game—and users can opt not to be shown any games with content flagged as mature.

Broken Picture Telephone was rated #62 in PC Magazine's list of the Top 100 Web Sites of 2009, and #5 in Jay Is Games's top ten games of 2009 in the Simple Idea category. Gamezebo praised the way its gameplay "tends to rapidly degenerate into hilarious misunderstandings" and called it "maybe one of the greatest online games ever." Appszoom magazine called the Android release "insanely-addicting", and Jay Is Games noted that site visitors "can spend a lot of time just browsing through the archives of completed games and laughing at the results." Academic analysis has identified BPT with the New Games movement, due to its goal being "a shared fun experience, rather than one team winning and one losing."

After Jay Is Games published a review of the game in June of that year, the influx of new players temporarily overwhelmed the BrokenPictureTelephone.com servers even though the game had been migrated to new servers in anticipation of such an increase in site visitors. Problems with server load continued, along with some bugs in the game's code and issues with malicious users trolling games; Novin took the game offline in 2010; the website's content was replaced with a message saying that development was continuing to address the problems with the game's functionality. An Android app version of the game was released 13 October 2012, with the first bugfix release, numbered 1.01, following on 16 October. The browser version of the game remained defunct for several years until it was relaunched in 2013.

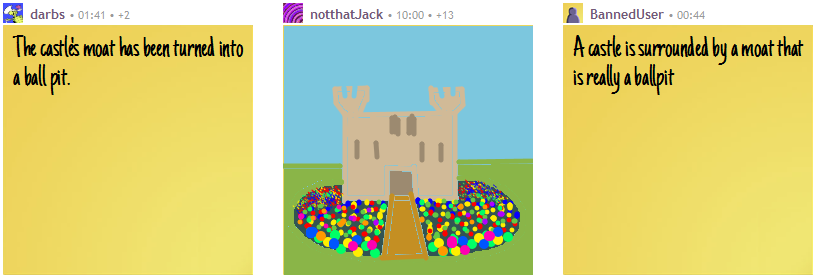
A cropped screenshot showing three rounds of Broken Picture Telephone, depicting gameplay in which each player has drawn or described the preceding player's contribution accurately. See ball pit.

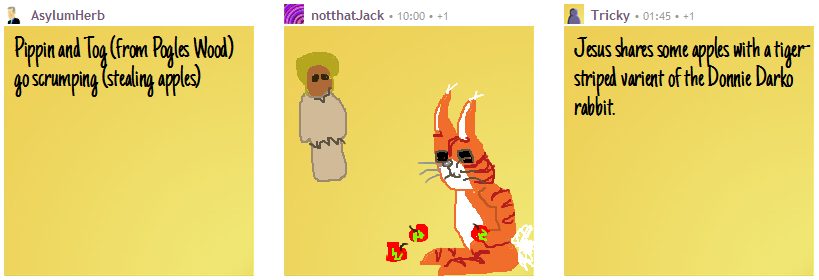
A cropped screenshot showing three rounds of Broken Picture Telephone, depicting gameplay in which each player has misinterpreted or misrepresented the preceding player's contribution, and changed the message conveyed as a result. See Pogles' Wood and Donnie Darko.

=== Further implementations ===
Following the success of Broken Picture Telephone, commercial boardgame versions Telestrations and Cranium Scribblish were released two years later in 2009. Drawception, Gartic Phone, Broken Phone, DoodleOrDie, DrawGuess, Interference, Teledraw, and other websites, also arrived in 2012.

Commercial board game versions such as Telestrations and Cranium Scribblish existed by 2009.

Cards Against Humanity (2011) is an edgier game similar to BPT.

==== Gartic Phone ====
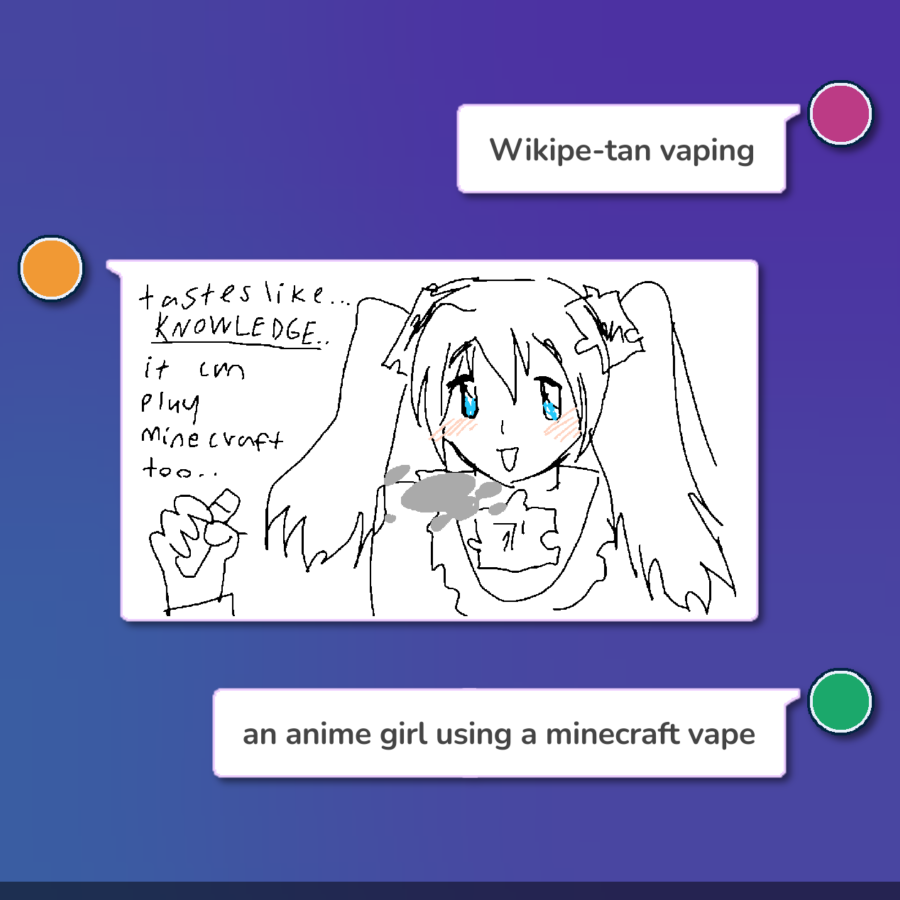
A cropped screenshot showing three rounds of Gartic Phone

While Onrizon Social Games' Gartic.io website launched in 2017, the company found massive success upon launching Gartic Phone in December 2020. Like BPT and similar games, it combines elements of Pictionary and Telephone. In Gartic Phone, players sketch a word or phrase and pass it to the next player, who must guess what the drawing represents. The game continues in a loop until the final player compares the last sentence with the original starting sentence. It offers various game modes, including: Normal, Knock-Off, Animation, Crowd, and introduced several new modes in early 2023. Gartic Phone is accessible through its website and supports multiple languages, making it available on PCs, tablets, and smartphones with an internet connection. Similar to Jackbox Games' party video games, Gartic Phone's "Crowd" mode allows for audience voting via invite links. Since Gartic Phone's success, Onrizon has developed spin-off games Gartic.TV and Gartic Show! In 2023, Gartic Phone was released as a free game on the Discord social platform.

== As a metaphor ==
The game of telephone is used as a metaphor for imperfect data transmission over multiple iterations. For example, the British zoologist Mark Ridley in his book Mendel's demon used the game as an analogy for the imperfect transmission of genetic information across multiple generations. In another example, Richard Dawkins used the game as a metaphor for infidelity in memetic replication, referring specifically to children trying to reproduce drawing of a Chinese junk in his essay Chinese Junk and Chinese Whispers. It was used in the movie Tár to represent gossip circling within an orchestra.

== See also ==
- Drawception
- Exquisite corpse
- Generation loss
- Mondegreen
- Pavement radio
- Snowball effect
- Round-trip translation
- Toyokawa Shinkin Bank incident
