= Drawception =

Web-based game

- The game's mascot, known as Drawception D, D, DC D, or Big D.
- Website type: Web Game
- Available in: English
- Owner: Blue Flame Labs
- Website: www.drawception.com
- Registration: Required, Free
- Launched: March 26, 2012
- Current status: Active
- Written in: HTML and JavaScript

Drawception is a multiplayer web-based drawing and guessing game. Considered similar to the telephone game, it was created by Jeremiah Freyholtz (aka "Reed") and released as an early beta on March 26, 2012.

== Gameplay ==
Drawception combines drawing with telephone game rules played by 12, 15, or 24 random players, with some exceptions. (With specific settings, a player can create 6-player games; in the past, there used to be glitched games with hundreds of players.) A game begins with a phrase, which a player then draws. Another player then describes that drawing. This process repeats until all players have taken their turn. Players are notified once a game has been completed and can view the resulting chain of drawings and descriptions. Games typically transform unexpectedly and end completely differently from where they began.

Players can optionally purchase cosmetic color palettes and tools from the game's virtual store. They can purchase with ducks, a virtual currency that they get from other players, or with microtransactions, which, once made, gives the player access to Drawception Gold, which offers the ability to award ducks to others as a way to reward helpful players.

== Reception ==
Drawception has often been compared to games like Draw Something or Draw My Thing and is noted to "combine the weird Pictionary-style guessing of Draw Something with the weird-to-weirder design of a game of Telephone." It has also been compared to Broken Picture Telephone, an earlier online game.

The game has been recommended by publications such as Rock Paper Shotgun, Kotaku, PC Gamer and personalities such as Felicia Day, Harry Partridge and Jazza.

It received an honorable mention by Rock Paper Shotgun in its yearly roundup of video games in 2012.
