= Pun Hlaing International School =

International school in Yangon, Myanmar

Coordinates: 16°50′37.4″N 96°05′12.8″E

Location
- Pun Hlaing Golf Estate Avenue; Hlaing Thayar Township; Yangon, Yangon Region; Myanmar

Information
- Type: British International School
- Established: 2014
- Headmaster: Derek Llewellyn
- Website: http://www.punhlaingschool.com

Pun Hlaing International School was an international school using the British Curriculum on the Pun Hlaing Golf Estate in Hlaingthaya Township, Yangon, Burma.

The school was founded in 2014 by Serge Pun & Associates (SPA group) and was managed by Harrow International Management Services, advised by Harrow School in London, England.

In August 2015, the academic and operational management of the school was handed over to Dulwich College International, advised by Dulwich College in London, England.

In August 2016, the school re-opened as a campus of Dulwich College Yangon. Dulwich College Yangon is spread over two campuses in Pun Hlaing and Star City, and educates children from age 2 – 14 years.

The site of the school was originally used by Yangon International School (YIS) as an early years centre.
