= Pavement radio =

Informal communication networks, primarily in urban African settings

Pavement radio, an expression first popularised by historian Stephen Ellis in referring to the grassroots, informal communication networks that relay information, primarily in urban African settings.

== Etymology ==
Pavement radio is the literal English translation of the French phrase radio trottoir which in US English would usually be rendered sidewalk radio.

== Significance ==
Particularly interesting to Ellis is the blurred distinction between broadcaster and listener, and the essentially democratic nature of the system (in that a how long-lasting a story is, and how widespread it becomes, and the form it eventually takes, are down to the predominant preferences of the recounters of the story). Pavement radio is mistrusted by a number of academics, journalists and politicians, citing its anonymous nature, and the propensity of the genre to include tales of witchcraft and other ludicrous notions. Ellis, however, argues that pavement radio is a modern continuation of the African oral tradition, and that such ostensibly inconceivable stories are metaphors or are indicative of historic or cultural beliefs, and as such not to be confused with factual news.

Why it might in this way be regarded as distinct from say, Western cultural beliefs, urban legend, rumours and metaphors such as propagated by gossip, Internet social networking services or informal actuality media, Ellis omitted to express definitively, either in the 1995 book or in later works.

== See also ==
- Chinese whispers
- Grapevine (gossip)
