= Shwe Taung Group =

Myanmar business conglomerate

Shwe Taung Group of Companies
- Formerly: Olympic Construction Group
- Type: Private
- Industry: Conglomerate
- Predecessor: Olympic Construction Company
- Founded: 1990; 36 years ago
- Headquarters: Myanmar
- Key people: Eike Htun (Chairman); Aung Zaw Naing (Managing Director)
- Products: Real estate, Construction & Engineering, Cement & Construction Materials, Energy & Infrastructure, Trading and Retail
- Website: www.shwetaunggroup.com

Shwe Taung Group of Companies (Burmese: ရွှေတောင်ကုမ္ပဏီအုပ်စု; Shwe Taung Group) is a Myanmar conglomerate. It has a large construction and engineering arm and is the parent company of a cement business in Myanmar. It also own Octagon International Service Trading which is the importer of machinery and construction vehicles.

Shwe Taung Group was formerly known as Olympic Construction Company, and was renamed Shwe Taung Group in 2004 after the banking scandal, money laundering accusation and drug links against the affiliated Asia Wealth Bank by the US department of Treasury and the bank's subsequent sanction in 2003 by the US Government and closure by the Government of Myanmar.

== Suspected money laundering and drug links ==
As recent as 2007, the US continue to suspect Shwe Taung Group (formerly Olympic Construction Group) of laundering drug money, as evident by the leaked US embassy cable exposed by wiki-leaks. Law enforcement agencies continue to suspect Shwe Taung group chairman, Aik Htun, close ties to the drug traffickers and the "rich investors" behind Shwe Taung Group is questionable with some claiming Aik Htun is just a "front man" for various parties.

== Key figures ==
The Chairman of Shwe Taung Group is Aik Htun, also spelt Eike Htun, while his son, Aung Zaw Naing, is Managing Director.

(Burmese: အိုက်ထွန်း IPA: [aiʔ tʰʊ́ɴ]; variously spelt Eik Tun, Eike Htun, and Aik Tun) is a prominent Burmese businessman, best known as the managing director and vice chairman of the sister company of Olympic Construction company, the Asia Wealth Bank, which was Burma's largest private bank until the banking crisis of 2003. The US Secretary of Treasury also designated Asia Wealth Bank as financial institutions of primary money laundering concern and the department report notes that the Asia Wealth bank have been linked to narcotics trafficking organizations in Southeast Asia. These findings by the US treasury were only rescinded after the revocation of the bank licenses by the government of Myanmar, and not because of remedial actions by the bank.

== See also ==
- Asia Wealth Bank
- Eike Htun
