= Toyokawa Shinkin Bank incident =

1973 bank run in Aichi Prefecture, Japan

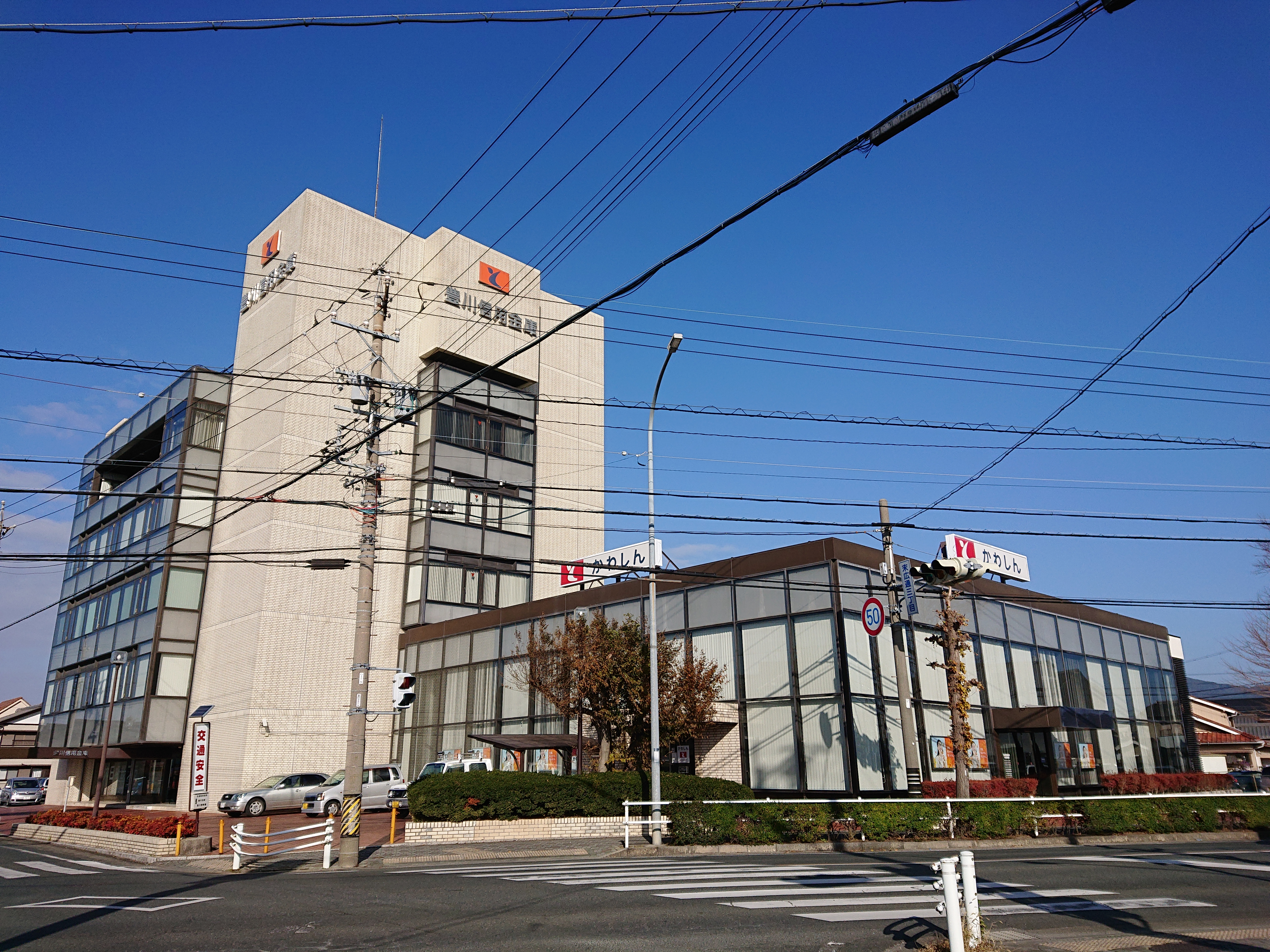
Toyokawa Shinkin Bank headquarters in Toyokawa, Aichi

The Toyokawa Shinkin Bank incident (豊川信用金庫事件, Toyokawa Shin'yō Kinko Jiken) was a bank run on Toyokawa Shinkin Bank (豊川信用金庫, Toyokawa Shin'yō Kinko) in what was then Kozakai, Aichi Prefecture, Japan in December 1973.

In December 1973, about 2 billion yen was withdrawn because of a rumor that "Toyokawa Shinkin Bank will go into bankruptcy" in Kozakai (currently, Toyokawa, Aichi) and its surrounding area. The National Police of Japan investigated the case and determined that the incident was not a crime. Their investigation revealed that the bank run was caused by a spontaneous rumor that originated from a conversation between three high school students. In Japan, this incident is sometimes cited as a case study in psychology or sociology, due to the rare detail in which the cause and progress of the bank run was documented.

== Sequence ==
On the morning of December 8, 1973, three female high school students talked about their jobs after graduating, in a car on the Iida Line, Japanese National Railways. Two of them (B, C) mocked A, who had been promised a job at Toyokawa Shinkin bank, remarking "that is dangerous". This remark was not a statement about the financial security of Toyokawa Shinkin bank, but rather that an armed robbery might target the bank. This was intended as a joke but A took it seriously. That night, A asked a relative of hers, D, "Is Shinkin Bank dangerous?" D assumed that she referred to Toyokawa Shinkin Bank, and asked another relative, E, who lived near the main branch of Toyokawa Shinkin Bank "Is Toyokawa Shinkin Bank dangerous?"

On December 9, E spoke to F who was the owner of a beauty salon, whether "Toyokawa Shinkin Bank might be in danger (of bankruptcy?)"

On December 10, a cleaning service shop owner H, and his wife I, who happened to be present there heard the rumor when F talked about it to relative G.

On December 11, the rumor was a topic of conversation among housewives in Kozakai. The rumor had taken on an assertive form such as, "Toyokawa Shinkin is in danger" at that moment.

On December 13, J who had borrowed the telephone in H's shop, ordered the person at the end of the line to withdraw 1.2 million yen from Toyokawa Shinkin Bank. J had not heard the rumor, and just requested the withdrawal in order to make payment. Person I, who overheard the ordered withdrawal, assumed that Toyokawa Shinkin Bank really was going into bankruptcy. She also withdrew 1.8 million yen. H and I then spread the rumor. Amateur radio operator K also spread it widely. Following this, 59 depositors came into Toyokawa Shinkin Bank and withdrew 50 million yen in total.

According to the testimony of a taxi driver who carried customers to the Kozakai branch of the bank, the rumor gradually worsened.

- "Toyokawa Shinkin Bank might be in danger." –A customer who got in the taxi in the afternoon
- "It is in danger." –A customer in around 2:30 PM
- "It will go into bankruptcy." –A customer in around 4:30 PM
- "Its shutter will never be lifted up tomorrow morning." –A customer at the night

On December 14, the panic escalated. A statement from Toyokawa Shinkin Bank released to settle the panic was misconstrued:

- "Odd money under ten thousand yen will be rounded down."
- "Their business condition is suspicious after all because they won't pay interest." – The bank repaid principal at first in an attempt to speed up the repayment process, as the calculation of interest took a long time.
- "Police is investigating the bank." – On seeing police officers who had arrived on the scene to control the crowd.
- A depositor made an inquiry that "I heard that a briefing session for bankruptcy is taking place."
- A depositor who was handed a numbered ticket for crowd control shouted angrily: "Such stuff is meaningless!"

In addition, new rumors arose: "Embezzlement of a banker is the cause of bankruptcy", "A banker got away with five thousand million yen", or "The chairman of the Toyokawa Shinkin Bank committed suicide" and so on.

From the evening of the 14th to the morning of the 15th, some media who were present by request from Toyokawa Shinkin Bank reported that the bank run was caused by a false rumor. The major newspaper headlines read:

- "5000人、デマに踊る(5000 People, Manipulated by False Rumor)" - Asahi Shimbun
- "デマに踊らされ信金、取り付け騒ぎ(Manipulated by False Rumor, Bank Run on Shinkin Bank)" - Yomiuri Shimbun
- "デマにつられて走る(Run by False Rumor)" - Mainichi Shimbun and so on.

The Bank of Japan held a press conference and stated that Toyokawa Shinkin Bank's business condition was fine. The Bank supplied cash to Toyokawa Shinkin Bank through Bank of Japan Nagoya branch to avoid confusion. The cash was piled up to a height of 1 meter, with a width of 5 meters in front of the vault of the main branch of Toyokawa Shinkin Bank to demonstrate their financial soundness.

On December 15, posters which said that there was no problem at Toyokawa Shinkin Bank under the joint signature of Shinkin Central Bank and National Association of Shinkin Banks were put up in Toyokawa Shinkin Bank's branches. The chairman of Toyokawa Shinkin Bank who had been rumored to have committed suicide started to persuade his customers at one branch. Depositors started to calm down because of these countermeasures. However, some agitated depositors still came into the bank.

On December 16, police revealed and released the propagation route of the false rumor, with the NHK reporting the police statement that night.

On December 17, major newspapers reported the police statement. However, the false rumor persisted. The rumor died over the following several days.

== Factors ==
The following factors escalated the situation:

- At that time in 1973, the conditions were right for spreading rumors easily due to social anxiety caused by the 1973 oil crisis. For instance, a toilet paper panic occurred in November 1973.
- Information was transformed by each participant, as in a game of telephone.
- Seven years prior to the incident, a financial institute in Toyohashi, a neighborhood of Kozakai went into bankruptcy, damaging the assets of its investors severely. H and I had spread the rumor in good faith because they were victims of this bankruptcy.
- When J ordered the withdrawal of a large amount of money in front of I, the rumor took on a decisive reality to I.
- In the small local society, people heard the rumor about Toyokawa Shinkin Bank multiple times, which reinforced their belief that it was true.
- In Japan, Deposit Insurance up to 1 million yen had already been effected based on the endorsement of Deposit Insurance Corporation of Japan, by the Deposit Insurance Act of 1971. However, it had not been introduced to the general public well enough. As a result, almost all of the depositors fell into panic.

== In popular culture ==
A short story Bank Run (銀行取付, Ginkō Torituke) written by Japanese novelist Ikko Shimizu (ja) is based on this incident. The storyline is that the stingy chairman of a bank spread rumors about his bank purposely to force the Bank of Japan to advertise his company without charge.

== See also ==
- Rumor
- Panic
- Reputational risk
- Chinese whispers
- Bank run

== Sources ==
The original article was created as a translation of a corresponding article in Japanese Wikipedia.

- Yōichi Itō; Kōichi Ogawa; Hirobumi Sakaki (1974-07-01). "デマの研究：愛知県豊川信用金庫"取り付け"騒ぎの現地調査". Journalism Quarterly Review (69). Tokyosha: 70–80.
- Yōichi Itō; Kōichi Ogawa; Hirobumi Sakaki (1974-10-01). "デマの研究：愛知県豊川信用金庫"取り付け"騒ぎの現地調査". Journalism Quarterly Review (70). Tokyosha: 100–111.
- Kenya Numata (1989-03-20). "流言の社会心理学" (PDF). St. Andrew's University Sociological Review. 22 (2): 97–117. ISSN 0287-6647.
- Tokumei Research 200X [in Japanese] (December 6, 1998). "デマ・パニックの正体を追え！" (in Japanese). Archived from the original on 2006-10-05.
- Naoya Sekiya [in Japanese] (2011-05-17). 風評被害 そのメカニズムを考える. Kobunsha Shinsyo (in Japanese). Kobunsha.
