= Telestrations =

2009 board game

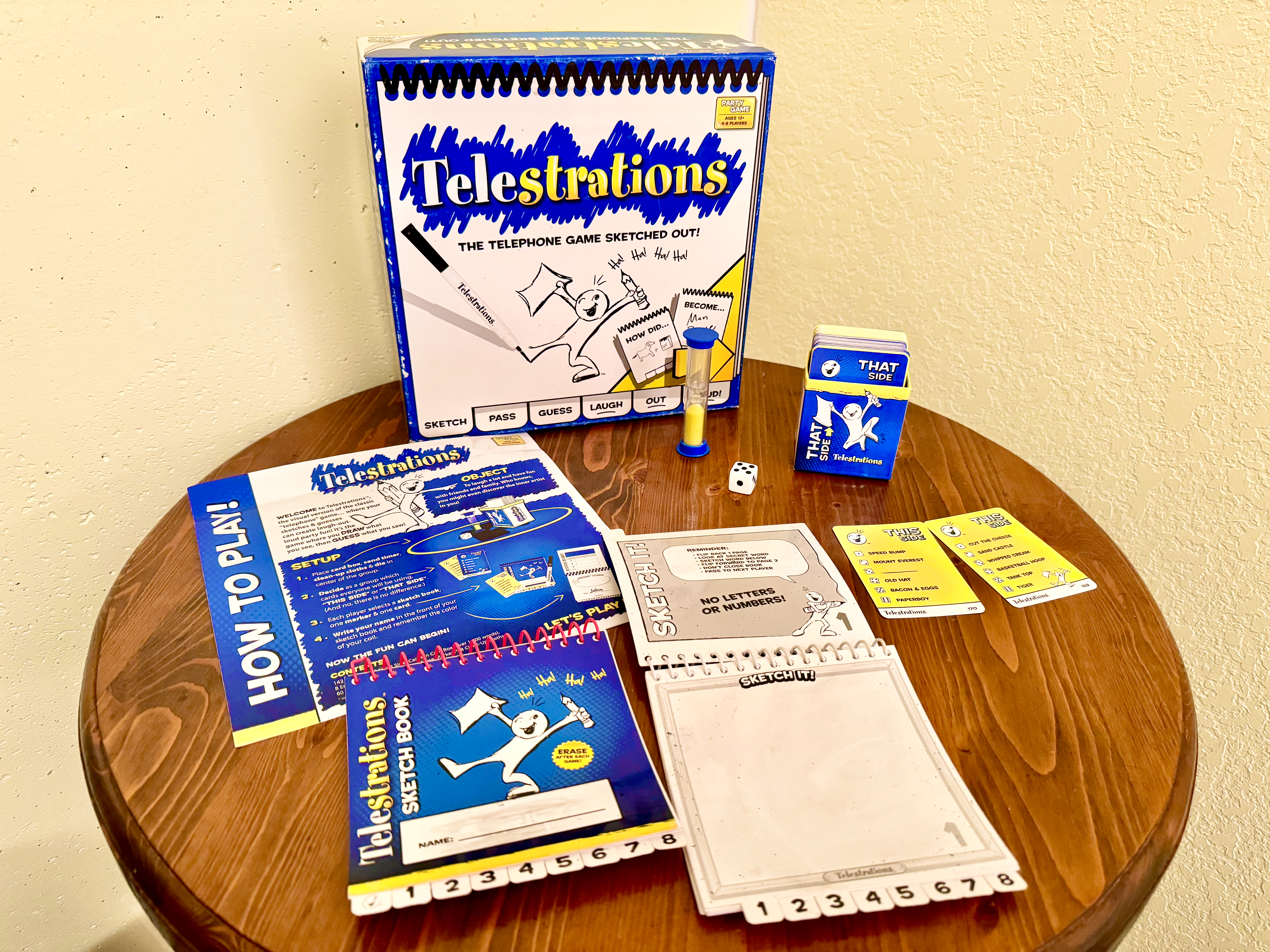
- Publishers: The Op
- Genres: Party game; Guessing game
- Players: 4–8
- Playing time: 30 minutes
- Age range: 12 and up
- Skills: Drawing

Telestrations is a party game in which players are prompted to sketch a word listed on a card, then guess what the other players have drawn. The game is produced by The Op (USAopoly).

== Gameplay ==
Each player is given a drawing book and a marker. At the start of each round, every player is given a card with a list of secret words, each with a number between one and six. One player rolls a die to determine which word each player will draw. The players then have sixty seconds to draw their word or phrase on page one of their drawing book.

Once the sixty seconds have passed, the players pass their books to the player on their left. On page two, the players guess what has been drawn on page one of the book which was passed to them. Once all players have written their guesses, they turn their books to page three and again pass their books to the left. Players continue to draw and guess until they have their original books back in hand.

Next, the players take turns revealing what was drawn and guessed in their books, then award points. At the end of each round, points are awarded:

- One point to "the sketcher": the player who had drawn their favorite sketch in their book
- One point to "the guesser": the player who had made their favorite guess in their book
- One point is awarded to the player who had begun the round if the final guess is the same as the secret word.

The player with the most points after three rounds wins the game.

== Reception ==
Gaming website BoardGameGeek named Telestrations the "Best Party Game" of 2010.

== Variations ==
Since the game's initial success, an adult version called "Telestrations: After Dark"; a party edition supporting up to 12 players; and an 80s- and 90s-themed expansion have been released.

A video game version of Telestrations has been announced with a release exclusively for Intellivision Amico.
