= Asia Wealth Bank =

Bank in Myanmar

- Native name: အာရှဓနဘဏ်
- Industry: Banking
- Founded: 1994
- Founder: Eike Htun
- Defunct: 2005
- Fate: Dissolved
- Headquarters: Yangon, Myanmar
- Parent: Olympic Construction Group

Asia Wealth Bank (Burmese: အာရှဓနဘဏ်) was a Myanmar bank that was found to be of primary money laundering concern by the US Secretary of Treasury. The bank license was subsequently revoked by the Government of Myanmar in the banking crisis in 2003. The bank is a sister company of the former Olympic Construction Group which is renamed as Shwe Taung Group in 2004 after the banking scandal.

The US Secretary of Treasury designated Asia Wealth Bank as financial institutions of primary money laundering concern and the department report notes that the Asia Wealth bank have been linked to narcotics trafficking organizations in Southeast Asia. These findings by the US treasury were only rescinded after the revocation of the bank licenses by the government of Myanmar, and not because of remedial actions by the bank.

== Directors ==
Aik Htun (Burmese: အိုက်ထွန်း IPA: [aiʔ tʰʊ́ɴ]; variously spelt Eik Tun, Eike Htun, and Aik Tun) is a prominent Burmese businessman, best known as the managing director and vice chairman of the sister company of Olympic Construction company, the Asia Wealth Bank, which was Burma's largest private bank until the banking crisis of 2003.

Aik Htun also runs one of the country's largest construction businesses, the Olympic Construction Company, established in 1990 and primarily focuses on residential and hotel development in Yangon He and his immediate family members are subject to European Union sanctions, from benefiting from close ties to the previous junta, the State Peace and Development Council. Olympic Construction company is renamed as Shwe Taung group in 2004 after the money laundering accusation and drug links by the US department of Treasury against the affiliate Asia Wealth Bank. As of 2013, Aik Htun remain as the chairman of business group Shwe Taung Group of companies.
