= Serge Pun =

Burmese businessman

- {ထန်ပီး}
- Born: 1953 (age 72–73); Rangoon, Burma
- Other name: Than Pi
- Education: St. Paul's English High School
- Children: Melvyn Pun; Cyrus Pun; Ivan Pun; Sebastian Pun

Serge Pun (Burmese: ထန်ပီး, Than Pi; Chinese: 潘繼澤; pinyin: Pān Jìzé; born 1953 in Rangoon, Burma) is a Burmese businessman of Sino-Burmese descent. He is the founder of Serge Pun & Associates (SPA) in Myanmar and Hong Kong, First Myanmar Investment (FMI), and FMI Air. He previously served as the chairman of Serge Pun & Associates Group (SPA Group), a multinational real estate firm, and Yoma Bank, a Burma-based bank.

== Early life ==
Pun was born in 1953 in Rangoon, Burma (now Myanmar). Pun belonged to an upper middle class family; his father worked for a Chinese bank. He attended Saint Paul's High School (now BEHS No. 6 Botataung) in Rangoon until 1962. Following the 1962 Burmese coup d'état by Ne Win, Pun's father relocated the family to Beijing in 1965. With the outbreak of the Cultural Revolution in 1966, Pun was separated from his family, and relocated to a state-owned farm in Yunnan with 1,500 other children.

== Career ==
In 1973, Pun left China for Hong Kong, where he began a career in real estate. In 1983, he founded Serge Pun & Associates.

Pun returned to Burma in 1991 to establish SPA (Serge Pun & Associates) Myanmar, which is a conglomerate with interests in automobile manufacturing, financial services, real estate development, technology, construction and healthcare. He became Executive Chairman of First Myanmar Investment (FMI) in 1992.

Pun was ranked #38 in Singapore's Richest 50 in the August 2013 issue of Forbes Asia, with a net worth of USD $500 million.

In November 2022, the military junta, the State Administration Council, awarded Pun with the Thiri Pyanchi title.

In June 2024, Pun was detained along with other Yoma executives for violating financial lending regulations in Myanmar. In July 2024, he vacated his leadership in 105 Yoma firms, and Yoma Strategic appointed his eldest son, Melvyn, as its chair. Between July and August 2024, the Burmese military government charged Pun with money laundering, illegal transactions, misuse of public funds, and use of criminal proceeds from online scam centers to expand Star City in Yangon's Thanlyin Township.

== Personal life ==
Pun married a Hongkonger, and has four sons, including Melvyn, Cyrus, Ivan, and Sebastian. Pun's brother, Martin Pun, is the vice chairman of SPA Group.

== See also ==
- Yoma Bank
