= Yoma Bank =

Largest commercial banks of Myanmar

Yoma Bank Limited
- Company type: Private
- Industry: Banking; Financial services
- Founded: May 1993
- Founder: Serge Pun
- Headquarters: Yangon, Myanmar
- Key people: Serge Pun (Chairman) (Chief executive officer)
- Products: Retail banking Corporate banking Foreign currency accounts Foreign exchange services
- Total assets: MMK 4.5 billion
- Number of employees: > 3100
- Website: www.yomabank.com

Yoma Bank Limited (Burmese: ရိုးမဘဏ်; Chinese: 祐瑪銀行; pinyin: Yòumǎ Yínháng) is one of Myanmar's largest commercial banks. As ‘the Responsible Bank’ for 30 years, Yoma Bank has been the fastest developing private bank in Myanmar. The bank has 81 branches across Myanmar.

== Foundation and first years ==
Yoma Bank was founded in May 1993 by entrepreneur Serge Pun of the First Myanmar Investment Company (FMI). After receiving a full commercial banking license, Yoma Bank opened its first branch in August 1993. Since 1996, Yoma Bank expanded and has become one of the largest private banks in Myanmar. In 1999, Yoma became Myanmar's first bank with a computerized accounting system and started using wireless communication to connect to all of its branches via satellite. In 2001, Yoma Bank operated 41 branches in 24 cities.

== Banking crisis ==
After the Myanmar banking crisis in 2003, Yoma Bank's license was limited, stopping the bank from accepting deposits or issuing loans. Yoma Bank focused on fee-based services such as remittances.

== Full operations ==
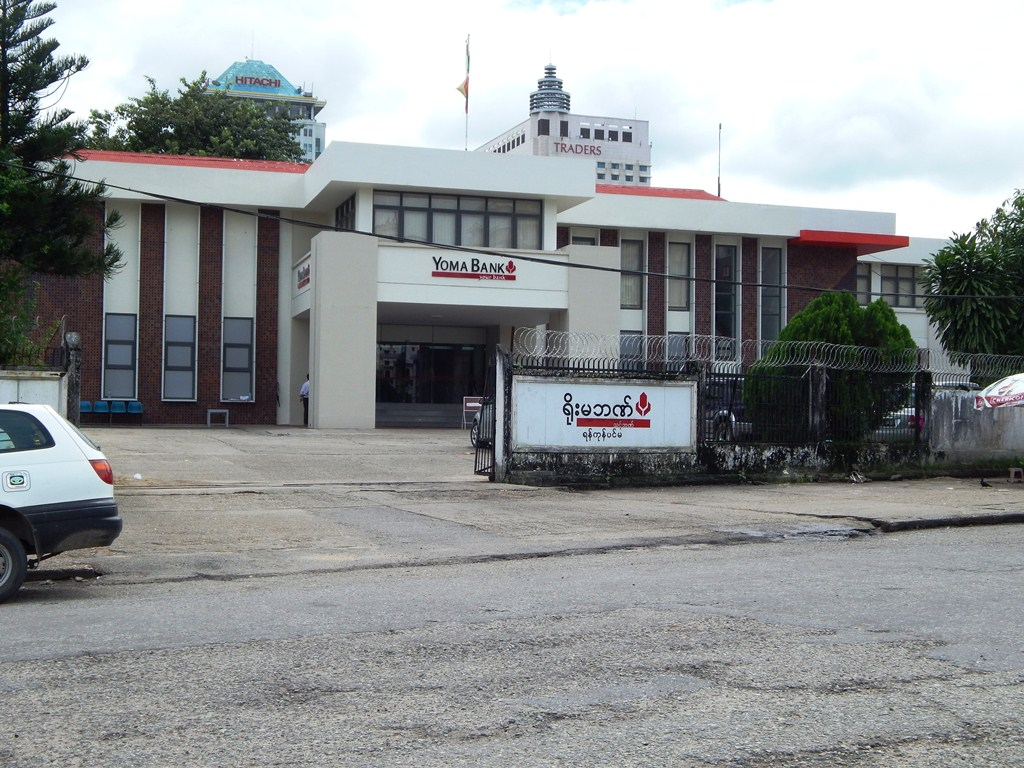
Yoma Bank, Yangon

In August 2012, the Central Bank of Myanmar reinstated Yoma Bank with a full banking license. Yoma Bank Chairman Pun stated the goal for the future development of the bank is "to be of international standard [yet a] local bank." To accomplish this, Yoma Bank began employing foreign managers and returning Burmese from abroad and focusing its service on small and medium-sized enterprises (SMEs). The International Finance Corporation (IFC), member of the World Bank Group, announced in May 2014 the long-term plan to promote the Yoma Bank in its SME lending program with a loan of over $30 million.

In August 2014, Yoma Bank employed more than 2,200 employees in 51 branches. After signing the contract with the IFC, the bank received the first $5 million for its SME program in September 2014. Additionally, the IFC agreed to assist Yoma Bank with installing a new core banking system and improving the bank's risk management and corporate governance.

In November 2014, Yoma Bank and the telecommunications firm Telenor Myanmar announced their cooperation to provide mobile banking to Myanmar. The aim of the cooperation is to provide the non-banked access to financial services.

For the transformation of their core banking system, Yoma Bank decided in March 2015, to utilize "FusionBanking Essence" software from the British provider Misys.

Because of Yoma Bank's access to SMEs and international banking standards, the German development agency GIZ selected Yoma Bank in May 2015 as a partner for its program to promote SMEs in Myanmar.

In 2018, Yoma Bank introduced a new bank account service named JZü. JZü is a prize-linked account to encourage the habit of depositing money into bank accounts among the public. On top of a 3% annual interest rate, which is calculated daily and paid monthly, each account is included in a monthly draw for a chance to earn double the monthly minimum balance. To qualify for the monthly draw, JZü account holders will need to maintain a MMK 200,000 minimum balance in their account.

As of 2023, Yoma Bank has over 3,100 employees in its operations with over 81 branches nationwide.

== See also ==
- Economy of Myanmar
- Kanbawza Bank Ltd
- Myanmar May Flower Bank
- List of banks in Myanmar
- 2003 Myanmar banking crisis
