= Bank run =

Mass withdrawal of money from banks

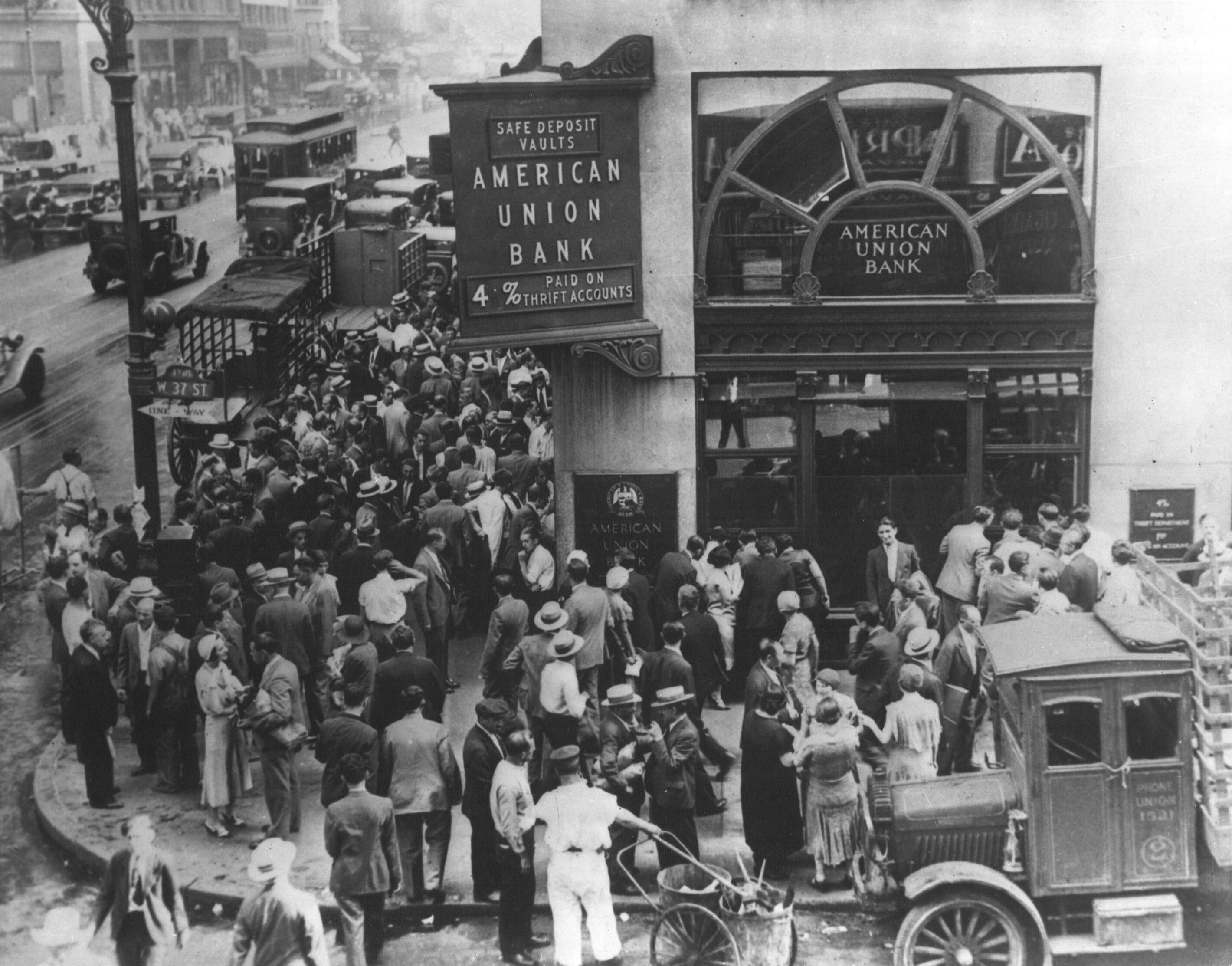
American Union Bank, New York City, April 26, 1932

A bank run or run on the bank occurs when many clients withdraw their money from a bank, because they believe the bank may fail in the near future. It may occur when, in a fractional-reserve banking system (where banks normally only keep a small proportion of their assets as cash), a large volume of customers seek to withdraw a greater amount of cash from deposit accounts with a financial institution in a short space of time than the institution has cash on-hand, because the customers believe that the institution is, or might become, insolvent. When they transfer funds to another institution, it may be characterized as a capital flight. As a bank run progresses, it may become a self-fulfilling prophecy: as more people withdraw cash, the likelihood of default increases, triggering further withdrawals. This can destabilize the bank to the point where it runs out of cash and thus faces sudden bankruptcy. To combat a bank run, a bank may acquire more cash from other banks or from the central bank, or limit the amount of cash customers may withdraw, either by imposing a hard limit or by scheduling quick deliveries of cash, encouraging high-return term deposits to reduce on-demand withdrawals, or suspending withdrawals altogether.

A banking panic or bank panic is a financial crisis that occurs when many banks suffer runs at the same time, as people suddenly try to convert their threatened deposits into cash or try to get out of their domestic banking system altogether. A systemic banking crisis is one where all or almost all of the banking capital in a country is wiped out. The resulting chain of bankruptcies can cause a long economic recession as domestic businesses and consumers are starved of capital as the domestic banking system shuts down. According to former U.S. Federal Reserve chairman Ben Bernanke, the Great Depression was caused by the failure of the Federal Reserve System to prevent deflation, and much of the economic damage was caused directly by bank runs. The cost of cleaning up a systemic banking crisis can be huge, with fiscal costs averaging 13% of GDP and economic output losses averaging 20% of GDP for important crises from 1970 to 2007.

Several techniques have been used to try to prevent bank runs or mitigate their effects. They have included a higher reserve requirement (requiring banks to keep more of their reserves as cash), government bailouts of banks, supervision and regulation of commercial banks, the organization of central banks that act as a lender of last resort, the protection of deposit insurance systems such as the U.S. Federal Deposit Insurance Corporation, and after a run has started, a temporary suspension of withdrawals. These techniques do not always work: for example, even with deposit insurance, depositors may still be motivated by beliefs they may lack immediate access to deposits during a bank reorganization.

== History ==
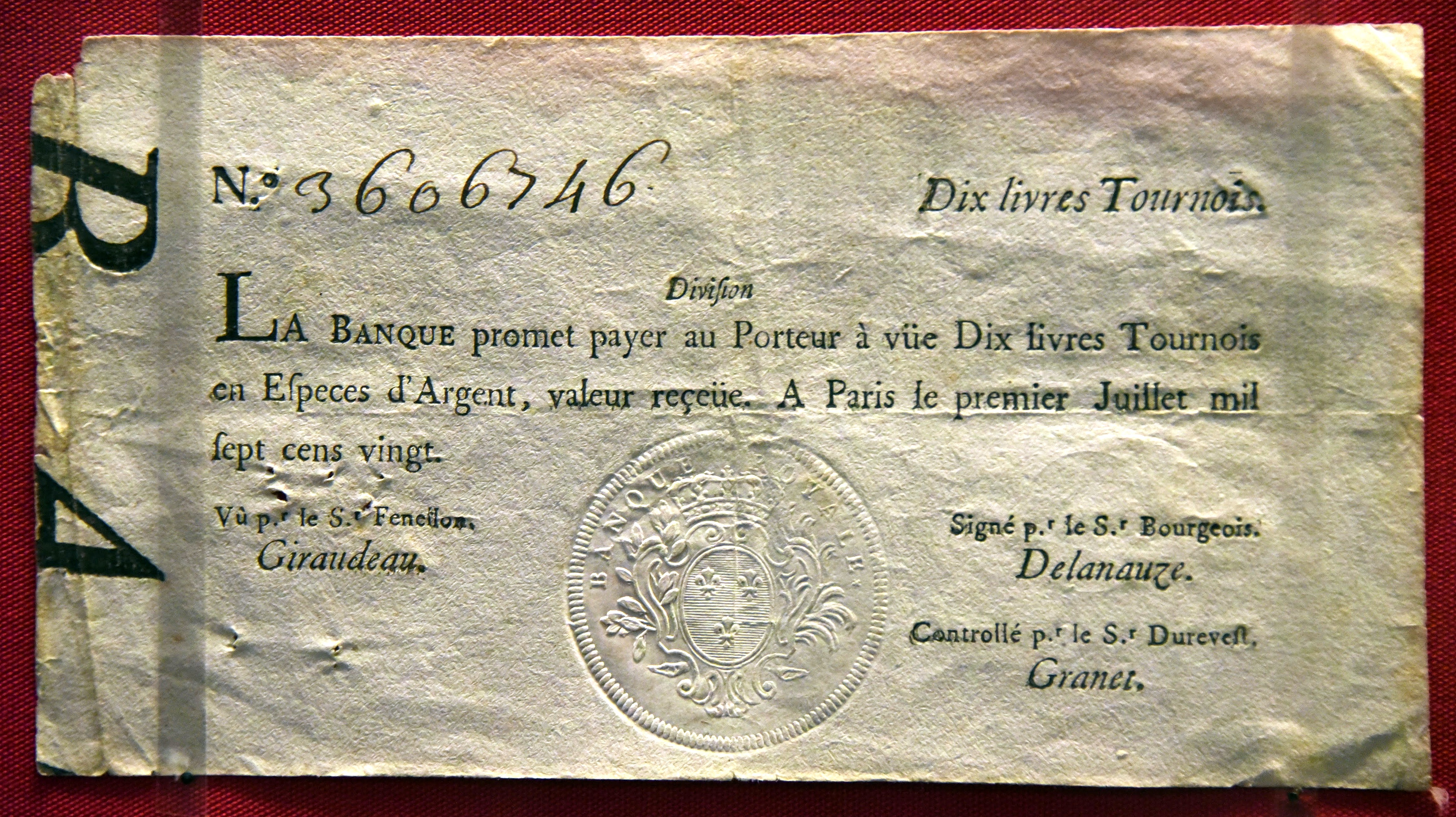
10 livres tournois banknote issued by Banque Royale, France, 1720. In 1720, shareholders demanded cash payment, leading to a run on the bank and financial chaos in France. On display at the British Museum.

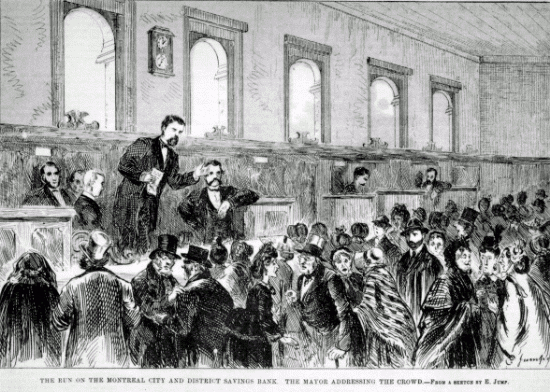
The run on the Montreal City and District Savings Bank, with the mayor addressing the crowd. Printed in 1872 in the Canadian Illustrated News.

Bank runs first appeared as a part of cycles of credit expansion and its subsequent contraction. From the 16th century onwards, English goldsmiths issuing promissory notes suffered severe failures due to bad harvests, plummeting parts of the country into famine and unrest. Other examples are the Dutch tulip manias (1634–37), the British South Sea Bubble (1717–19), the French Mississippi Company (1717–20), the post-Napoleonic depression (1815–30), and the Great Depression (1929–39).

Bank runs have also been used to secure much-needed political reforms. In 1832, for example, the British government under the Duke of Wellington overturned a majority government on the orders of the king, William IV, to prevent reform (the later Reform Act 1832 (2 & 3 Will. 4. c. 45)). Wellington's actions angered reformers, and they began a run on the banks under the rallying cry "Stop the Duke, go for gold!". After the cancellation of $25M of deposits, the government yielded and stopped blocking passage of the reform bill.

Many of the recessions in the United States were caused by banking panics. The Great Depression contained several banking crises consisting of runs on multiple banks from 1929 to 1933; some of these were specific to regions of the U.S. Bank runs were most common in states whose laws allowed banks to operate only a single branch, dramatically increasing risk compared to banks with multiple branches particularly when single-branch banks were located in areas economically dependent on a single industry.

Banking panics began in the Southern United States in November 1930, one year after the stock market crash, triggered by the collapse of a string of banks in Tennessee and Kentucky, which brought down their correspondent networks. In December, New York City experienced massive bank runs that were contained to the many branches of a single bank. Philadelphia was hit a week later by bank runs that affected several banks, but were successfully contained by quick action by the leading city banks and the Federal Reserve Bank. Withdrawals became worse after financial conglomerates in New York and Los Angeles failed in prominently-covered scandals. Much of the U.S. Depression's economic damage was caused directly by bank runs, though Canada had no bank runs during this same era due to different banking regulations.

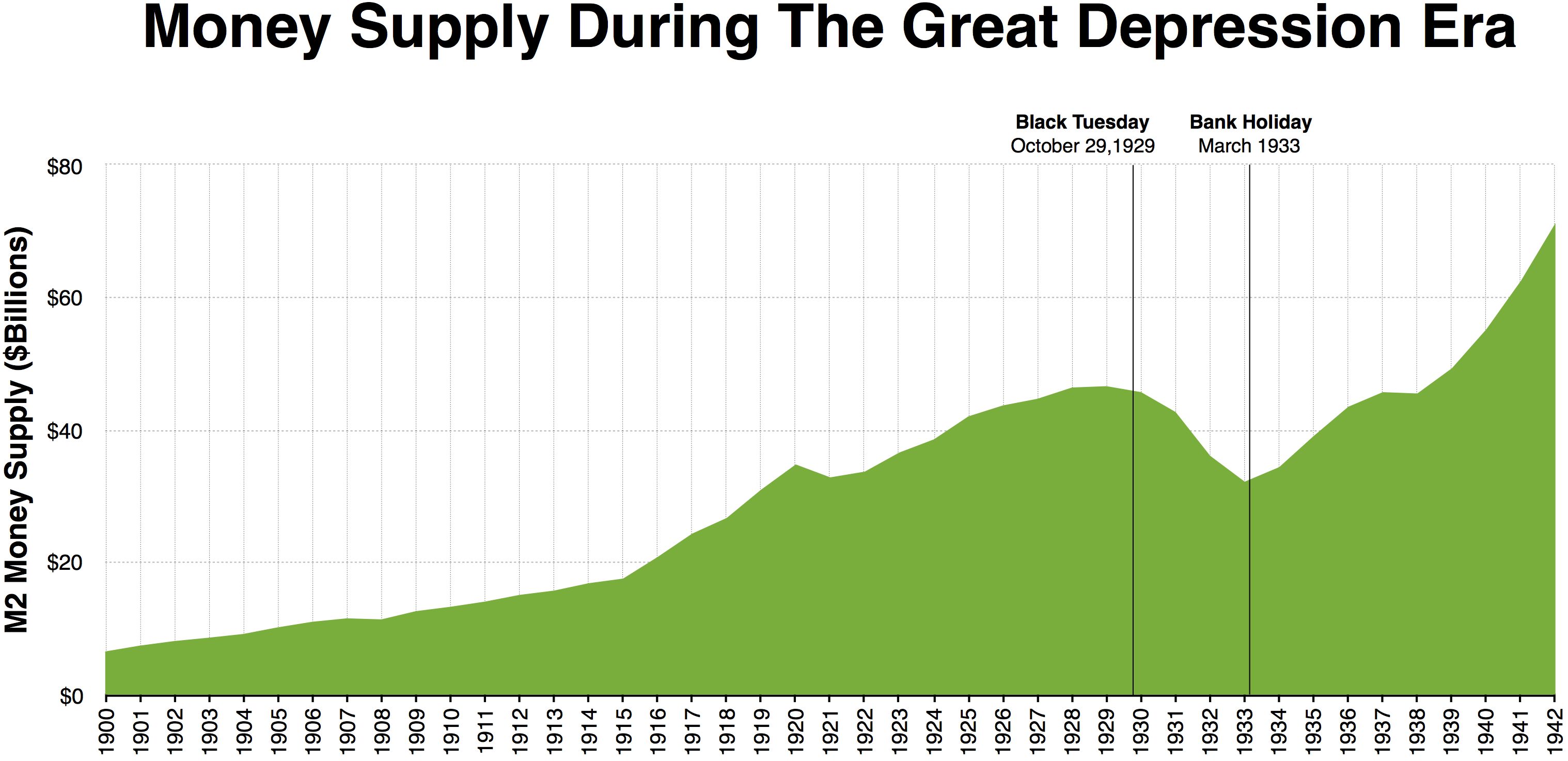
Money supply decreased substantially between Black Tuesday and the Bank Holiday in March 1933 when there were massive bank runs across the United States.

Milton Friedman and Anna Schwartz argued that steady withdrawals from banks by nervous depositors ("hoarding") were inspired by news of the fall 1930 bank runs and forced banks to liquidate loans, which directly caused a decrease in the money supply, shrinking the economy. Bank runs continued to plague the United States for the next several years. Citywide runs hit Boston (December 1931), Chicago (June 1931 and June 1932), Toledo (June 1931), and St. Louis (January 1933), among others. Institutions put into place during the Depression have prevented runs on U.S. commercial banks since the 1930s, even under conditions such as the U.S. savings and loan crisis of the 1980s and 1990s.

The 2008 financial crisis was centered around market-liquidity failures that were comparable to a bank run. The crisis contained a wave of bank nationalizations, including those associated with Northern Rock of the U.K. and IndyMac of the U.S. This crisis was caused by low real interest rates stimulating an asset price bubble fuelled by new financial products that were not stress tested and that failed in the downturn.

== Theory ==
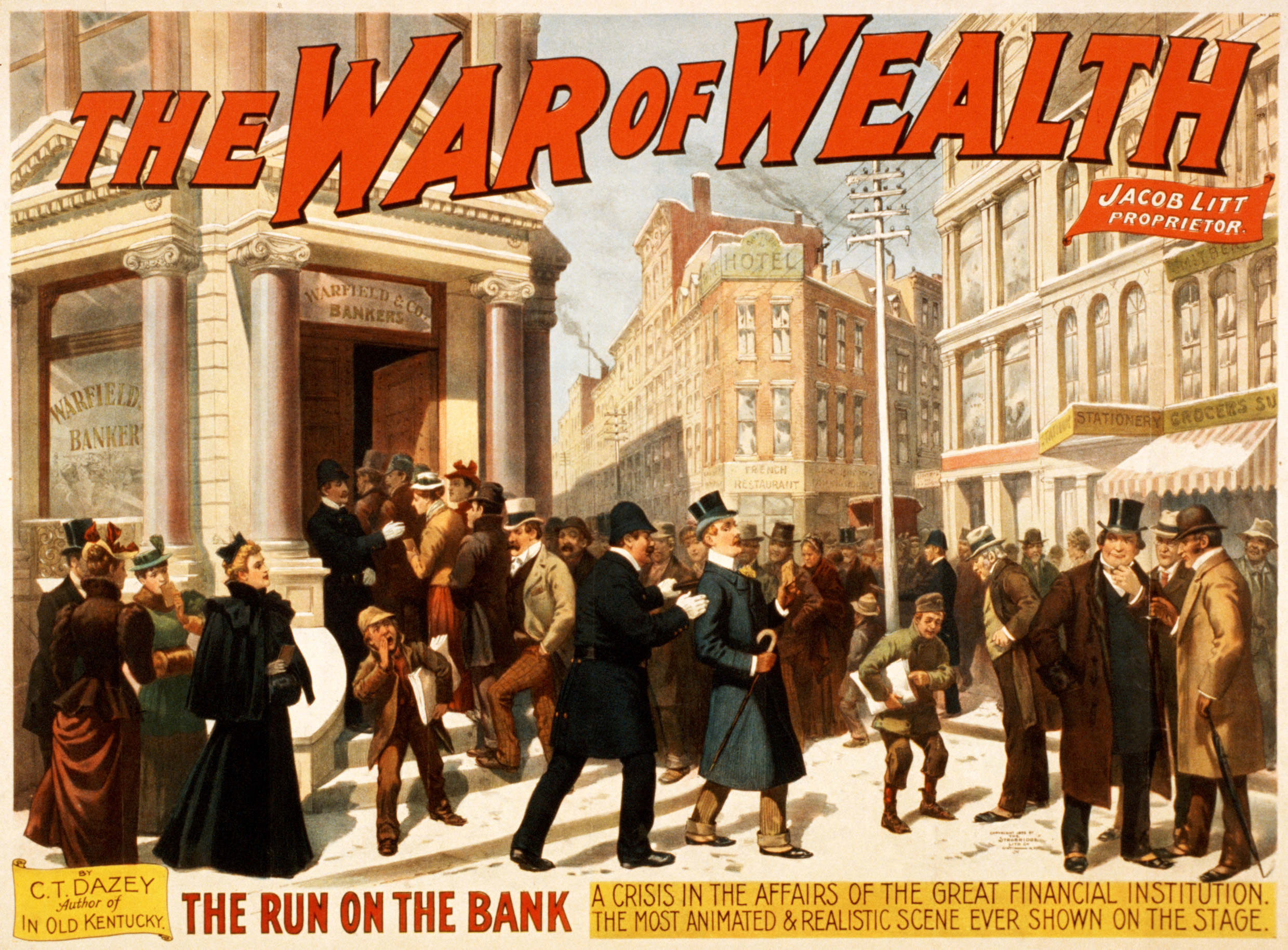
A poster for the 1896 Broadway melodrama The War of Wealth depicts a 19th-century bank run in the U.S.

Under fractional-reserve banking, the type of banking currently used in most developed countries, banks retain only a fraction of their demand deposits as cash. The remainder is invested in securities and loans, whose terms are typically longer than the demand deposits, resulting in an asset–liability mismatch. No bank has enough reserves on hand to cope with all deposits being taken out at once.

Diamond and Dybvig developed an influential model to explain why bank runs occur and why banks issue deposits that are more liquid than their assets. According to the model, the bank acts as an intermediary between borrowers who prefer long-maturity loans and depositors who prefer liquid accounts. The Diamond–Dybvig model provides an example of an economic game with more than one Nash equilibrium, where it is logical for individual depositors to engage in a bank run once they suspect one might start, even though that run will cause the bank to collapse.

In the model, business investment requires expenditures in the present to obtain returns that take time in coming, for example, spending on machines and buildings now for production in future years. A business or entrepreneur that needs to borrow to finance investment will want to give their investments a long time to generate returns before full repayment, and will prefer long maturity loans, which offer little liquidity to the lender. The same principle applies to individuals and households seeking financing to purchase large-ticket items such as housing or automobiles. The households and firms who have the money to lend to these businesses may have sudden, unpredictable needs for cash, so they are often willing to lend only on the condition of being guaranteed immediate access to their money in the form of liquid demand deposit accounts, that is, accounts with shortest possible maturity. Since borrowers need money and depositors fear to make these loans individually, banks provide a valuable service by aggregating funds from many individual deposits, portioning them into loans for borrowers, and spreading the risks both of default and sudden demands for cash. Banks can charge much higher interest on their long-term loans than they pay out on demand deposits, allowing them to earn a profit.

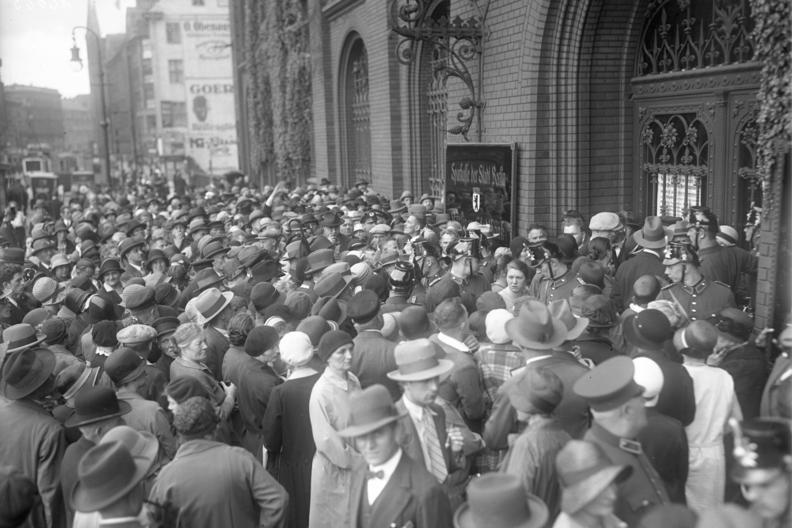
Depositors clamor to withdraw their savings from a bank in Berlin, 13 July 1931

If only a few depositors withdraw at any given time, this arrangement works well. Barring some major emergency on a scale matching or exceeding the bank's geographical area of operation, depositors' unpredictable needs for cash are unlikely to occur at the same time; that is, by the law of large numbers, banks can expect only a small percentage of accounts withdrawn on any one day because individual expenditure needs are largely uncorrelated. A bank can make loans over a long horizon, while keeping only relatively small amounts of cash on hand to pay any depositors who may demand withdrawals.

However, if many depositors withdraw all at once, the bank itself (as opposed to individual investors) may run short of liquidity, and depositors will rush to withdraw their money, forcing the bank to liquidate many of its assets at a loss, and eventually to fail. If such a bank were to attempt to call in its loans early, businesses might be forced to disrupt their production while individuals might need to sell their homes and/or vehicles, causing further losses to the larger economy. Even so, many, if not most, debtors would be unable to pay the bank in full on demand and would be forced to declare bankruptcy, possibly affecting other creditors in the process.

A bank run can occur even when started by a false story. Even depositors who know the story is false will have an incentive to withdraw, if they suspect other depositors will believe the story. The story becomes a self-fulfilling prophecy. Indeed, Robert K. Merton, who coined the term self-fulfilling prophecy, mentioned bank runs as a prime example of the concept in his book Social Theory and Social Structure. Mervyn King, governor of the Bank of England, once noted that it may not be rational to start a bank run, but it is rational to participate in one once it had started.

== Systemic banking crisis ==
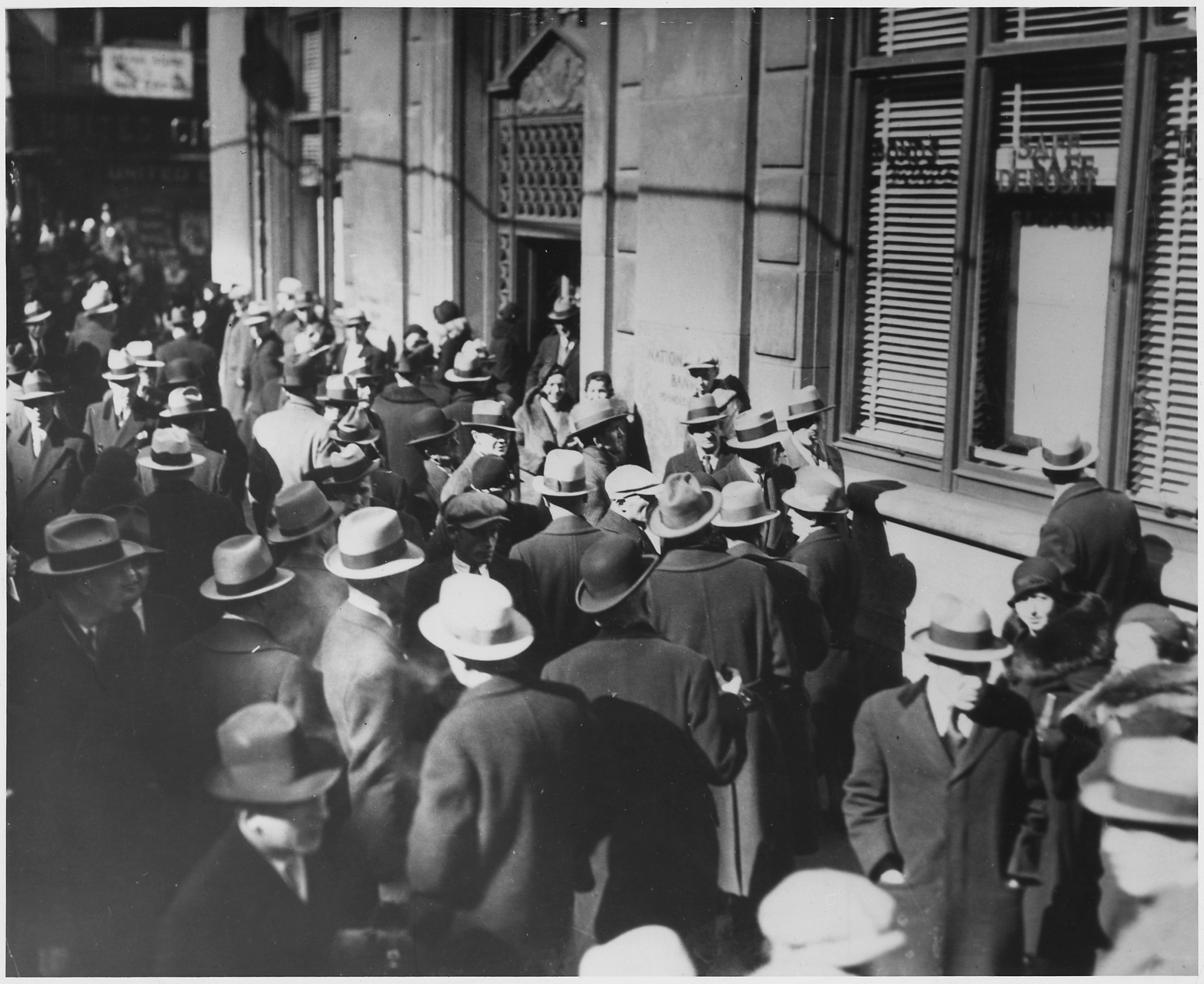
Bank run during the Great Depression in the United States, February 1933

A bank run is the sudden withdrawal of deposits of just one bank. A banking panic or bank panic is a financial crisis that occurs when many banks suffer runs at the same time, as a cascading failure. In a systemic banking crisis, all or almost all of the banking capital in a country is wiped out; this can result when regulators ignore systemic risks and spillover effects.

Systemic banking crises are associated with substantial fiscal costs and large output losses. Frequently, emergency liquidity support and blanket guarantees have been used to contain these crises, not always successfully. Although fiscal tightening may help contain market pressures if a crisis is triggered by unsustainable fiscal policies, expansionary fiscal policies are typically used. In crises of liquidity and solvency, central banks can provide liquidity to support illiquid banks. Depositor protection can help restore confidence, although it tends to be costly and does not necessarily speed up economic recovery. Intervention is often delayed in the hope that recovery will occur, and this delay increases the stress on the economy.

Some measures are more effective than others in containing economic fallout and restoring the banking system after a systemic crisis. These include establishing the scale of the problem, targeted debt relief programs to distressed borrowers, corporate restructuring programs, recognizing bank losses, and adequately capitalizing banks. Speed of intervention appears to be crucial; intervention is often delayed in the hope that insolvent banks will recover if given liquidity support and relaxation of regulations, and in the end this delay increases stress on the economy. Programs that are targeted, that specify clear quantifiable rules that limit access to preferred assistance, and that contain meaningful standards for capital regulation, appear to be more successful. According to IMF, government-owned asset management companies (bad banks) are largely ineffective due to political constraints.

A silent run occurs when the implicit fiscal deficit from a government's unbooked loss exposure to zombie banks is large enough to deter depositors of those banks. As more depositors and investors begin to doubt whether a government can support a country's banking system, the silent run on the system can gather steam, causing the zombie banks' funding costs to increase. If a zombie bank sells some assets at market value, its remaining assets contain a larger fraction of unbooked losses; if it rolls over its liabilities at increased interest rates, it squeezes its profits along with the profits of healthier competitors. The longer the silent run goes on, the more benefits are transferred from healthy banks and taxpayers to the zombie banks. The term is also used when many depositors in countries with deposit insurance draw down their balances below the limit for deposit insurance.

The cost of cleaning up after a crisis can be huge. In systemically important banking crises in the world from 1970 to 2007, the average net recapitalization cost to the government was 6% of GDP, fiscal costs associated with crisis management averaged 13% of GDP (16% of GDP if expense recoveries are ignored), and economic output losses averaged about 20% of GDP during the first four years of the crisis.

According to Copelovitch and Singer, states with larger foreign capital inflows and large securities markets are more vulnerable banking crises.

== Prevention and mitigation ==
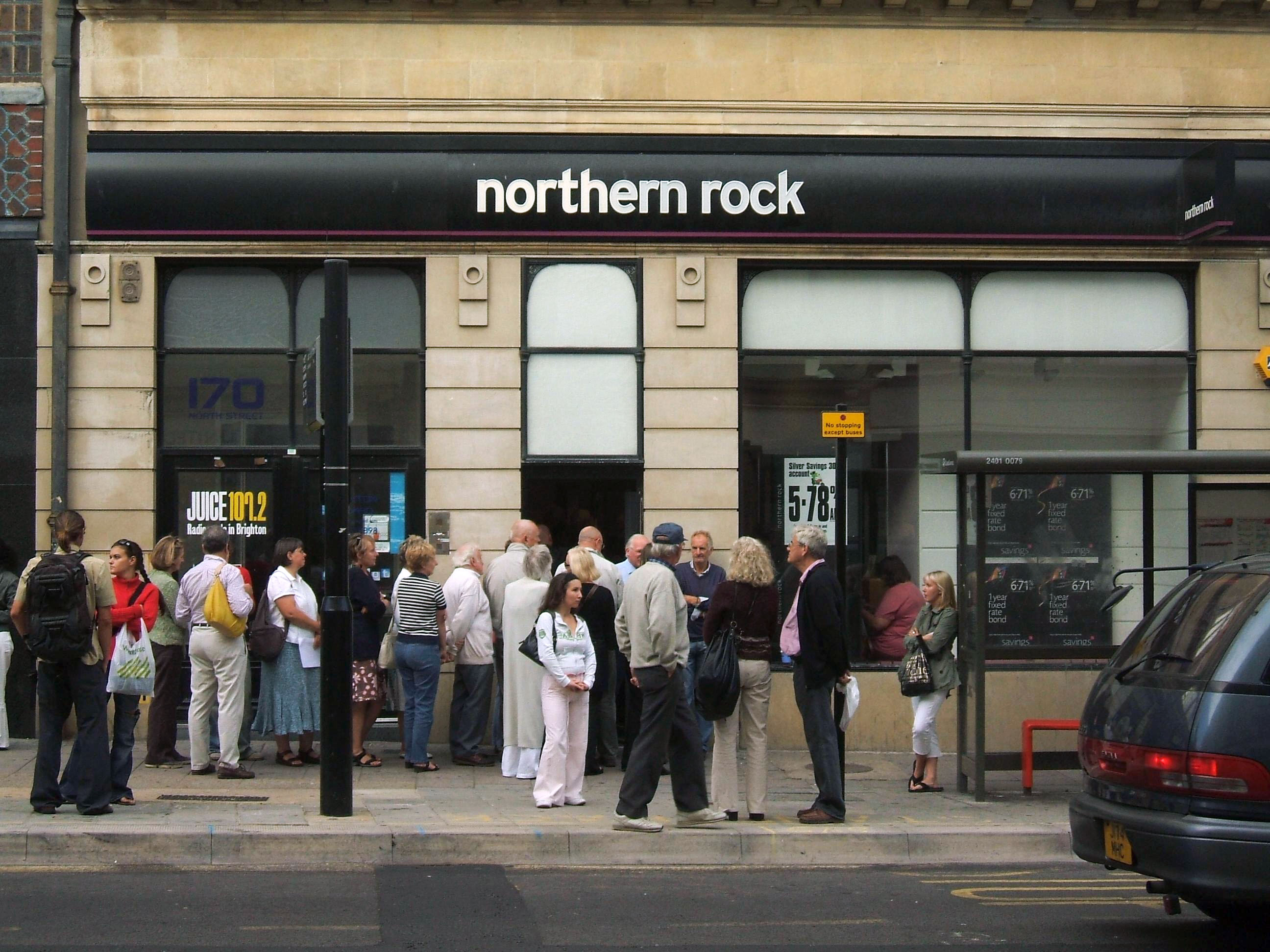
2007 run on Northern Rock, a U.K. bank, during the 2008 financial crisis

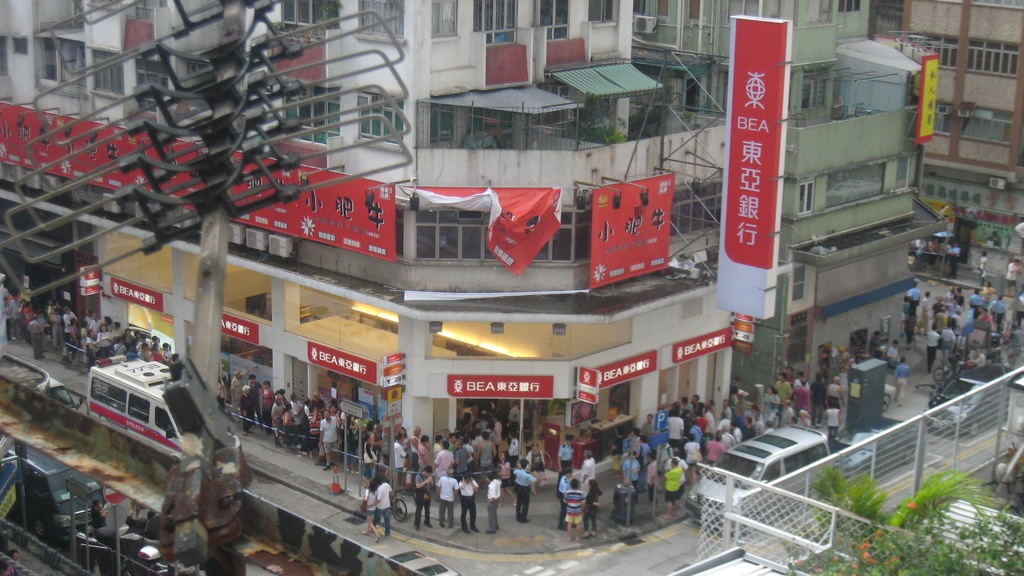
A run on a Bank of East Asia branch in Hong Kong, caused by "malicious rumours" in 2008

Several techniques have been developed to help prevent or mitigate bank runs.

=== Individual banks ===
Some prevention techniques apply to individual banks, independently of the rest of the economy.

- Banks often project an appearance of stability, with solid architecture and conservative dress.
- A bank may try to hide information that might spark a run. For example, in the days before deposit insurance, it made sense for a bank to have a large lobby and fast service, to prevent the formation of a line of depositors extending out into the street which might cause passers-by to infer a bank run.
- A bank may try to slow down the bank run by artificially slowing the process. One technique is to get a large number of friends and relatives of bank employees to stand in line and make many small, slow transactions.
- Scheduling prominent deliveries of cash can convince participants in a bank run that there is no need to withdraw deposits hastily.
- Banks can encourage customers to make term deposits that cannot be withdrawn on demand. If term deposits form a high enough percentage of a bank's liabilities, its vulnerability to bank runs will be reduced considerably. The drawback is that banks have to pay a higher interest rate on term deposits.
- A bank can temporarily suspend withdrawals to stop a run; this is called suspension of convertibility. In many cases, the threat of suspension prevents the run, which means the threat need not be carried out.
- Emergency acquisition of a vulnerable bank by another institution with stronger capital reserves. This technique is commonly used by the U.S. Federal Deposit Insurance Corporation to dispose of insolvent banks, rather than paying depositors directly from its own funds.
- If there is no immediate prospective buyer for a failing institution, a regulator or deposit insurer may set up a bridge bank which operates temporarily until the business can be liquidated or sold.
- To clean up after a bank failure, the government may set up a "bad bank", which is a new government-run asset management corporation that buys individual nonperforming assets from one or more private banks, reducing the proportion of junk bonds in their asset pools, and then acts as the creditor in the insolvency cases that follow. This, however, creates a moral hazard problem, essentially subsidizing bankruptcy: temporarily underperforming debtors can be forced to file for bankruptcy in order to make them eligible to be sold to the bad bank.

=== Systemic techniques ===
Some prevention techniques apply across the whole economy, though they may still allow individual institutions to fail.

- Deposit insurance systems insure each depositor up to a certain amount, so that depositors' savings are protected even if the bank fails. This removes the incentive to withdraw one's deposits simply because others are withdrawing theirs. However, depositors may still be motivated by fears they may lack immediate access to deposits during a bank reorganization. To avoid such fears triggering a run, the U.S. FDIC keeps its takeover operations secret, and re-opens branches under new ownership on the next business day. Government deposit insurance programs can be ineffective if the government itself is perceived to be running short of cash.
- Bank capital requirements reduces the possibility that a bank becomes insolvent. The Basel III agreement strengthens bank capital requirements and introduces new regulatory requirements on bank liquidity and bank leverage.
  - Full-reserve banking is the hypothetical case where the reserve ratio is set to 100%, and funds deposited are not lent out by the bank as long as the depositor retains the legal right to withdraw the funds on demand. Under this monetary reform, banks would be forced to match maturities of loans and deposits, thus greatly reducing the risk of bank runs.
  - A less severe alternative to full-reserve banking is a reserve ratio requirement, which limits the proportion of deposits which a bank can lend out, making it less likely for a bank run to start, as more reserves will be available to satisfy the demands of depositors. This practice sets a limit on the fraction in fractional-reserve banking.
- Transparency may help prevent crises from spreading through the banking system. In the context of the 2007-2010 subprime mortgage crisis, the extreme complexity of certain types of assets made it difficult for market participants to assess which financial institutions would survive, which amplified the crisis by making most institutions very reluctant to lend to one another.
- Central banks act as a lender of last resort. To prevent a bank run, the central bank guarantees that it will make short-term loans to banks, to ensure that, if they remain economically viable, they will always have enough liquidity to honor their deposits. Walter Bagehot's book Lombard Street provides an influential early analysis of the role of the lender of last resort.

The role of the lender of last resort, and the existence of deposit insurance, both create moral hazard, since they reduce banks' incentive to avoid making risky loans. They are nonetheless standard practice, as the benefits of collective prevention are commonly believed to outweigh the costs of excessive risk-taking.

To mitigate the moral hazard associated with external interventions and the systemic risk of bank runs, withdrawal fees can be used. Although never implemented in commercial banks, cryptocurrencies and money market funds have adopted similar techniques to price liquidity, thereby making each transaction (or redemption) internalize the liquidity externality. In the bank run theory, withdrawal fees can be modelled as a function of how many depositors withdraw at a given time, or based on overall liquidity depletion; the fee is a percentage value that the bank levies on the successful withdrawal, hence increasing also in the deposit amount, making it a Pigouvian device to disincentivize run-type behaviors. Therefore, withdrawal fees are an endogenous tool to reinforce other mechanisms, for instance, deposit insurance, providing protection against the uninsured depositors who, as demonstrated by the collapse of Silicon Valley Bank, are the main cause of runs, as their incentive to run escapes the deposit guarantee. With withdrawal fees in place, running is no longer the most obvious strategy, thus making the self-fulfilling equilibrium less trivial.

Techniques to deal with a banking panic when prevention have failed:

- Declaring an emergency bank holiday
- Government or central bank announcements of increased lines of credit, loans, or bailouts for vulnerable banks

== Cyber runs ==
A 'cyber run' is a rapid withdrawal of wholesale or institutional deposits that is precipitated by a cyber-attack on a bank's deposit platform.

In contrast to a credit-driven bank run, the trigger is operational: depositors fear losing timely access to their funds or the ability to settle payments, rather than doubting the bank's solvency. Research by Duffie and Younger simulated adverse and severe cyber-run scenarios for twelve systemically important U.S. banking groups. Although those banks held enough high-quality liquid assets to meet even a 75% 30-day outflow, the study cautions that cyber-run outflows could arrive much faster than the Liquidity Coverage Ratio (LCR) assumptions that underpin current prudential rules.

Because a major cyber incident could simultaneously disable key payment-system nodes, the paper argues that liquidity shortfalls might spill over to the real economy even if individual banks remain liquid. As a safeguard, the authors propose an 'emergency payment node', a narrow, pre-authorized payment bank that would lie dormant in normal times and be activated only to process wholesale payments between critical financial firms during a systemic operational outage. The same study recommends that regulator incorporate cyber-run scenarios into supervisory stress tests and explore additional tools (for example, temporary central-bank accounts or central-bank digital currencies for non-banks) to preserve payment-system continuity.

A real-world example of a cyber run occurred in March 2023, when customers withdrew $42 billion - nearly a quarter of Silicon Valley Bank's total deposits - within a day.

Another real example occurred in June 2025, when Iran's state-owned Bank Sepah was hit by a destructive cyber-attack attributed to the hacktivist group Predatory Sparrow. The incident disabled online banking, card payments, and many ATMs. Within hours, long queues formed as depositors rushed to withdraw cash, promoting ad-hoc withdrawal limits and a three-day branch closure. Within days, a sharp increase in withdrawals spread to multiple banks in Iran, triggering additional withdrawal limits and declared 50% increase in liquidity supplied to banks by the Central Bank of Iran. Behavior analysts described this incident as a classic bank run triggered by an operational shock.

== Depictions in fiction ==
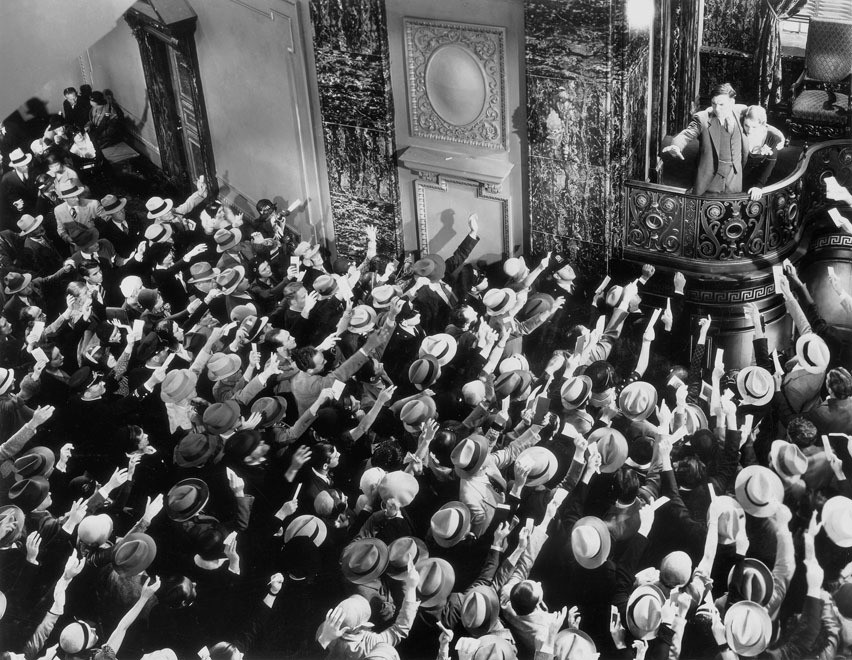
Bank president Walter Huston faces a crowd of frantic depositors in the Frank Capra film American Madness (1932).

The bank panic of 1933 is the setting of Archibald MacLeish's 1935 play, Panic. Motion picture depictions of bank runs include those in American Madness (1932), It's a Wonderful Life (1946, set in 1932), Silver River (1948), Mary Poppins (1964, set in 1910 London), Rollover (1981), Noble House (1988) and The Pope Must Die (1991).

Arthur Hailey's novel The Moneychangers includes a potentially fatal run on a fictional American bank.

A run on a bank is one of the many causes of the characters' suffering in Upton Sinclair's The Jungle.

In The Simpsons episode "The PTA Disbands", Bart Simpson starts a whispering campaign at the Bank of Springfield as a prank to instigate a bank run. The episode spoofs It's a Wonderful Life.

== See also ==
- List of bank runs
- Federal Deposit Insurance Corporation FDIC 1933
  - Leo Crowley, head FDIC
- Market run
- Altman Z-score
- Financial crisis
- Ponzi scheme – A Ponzi scheme can collapse due to a large and rapid withdrawal, in a similar manner to a bank run
