= Myanmar Mayflower Bank =

Former Myanmar bank

Coordinates: 16°46′25″N 96°09′42″E

- Industry: Banking
- Founded: 1994
- Founder: Kyaw Myint
- Defunct: 2005
- Fate: Dissolved
- Headquarters: Yangon, Myanmar

Myanmar Mayflower Bank was a bank of Myanmar. Founded in 1994 by Kyaw Myint, it was formerly the third largest bank in the country with ten branches. It has, like Banco Delta Asia, been designated as a "primary money laundering concern" by the United States Treasury and thus is subject to very strict regulations in its dealings with American banks. The bank's license was revoked by government authorities in March 2005 following a money laundering investigation.
