= Government Bank Insurance Fund (Norway) =

The Government Bank Insurance Fund (Norwegian: Statens Banksikringsfond) is a Norwegian fund for deposit insurance.

It was established on 15 March 1991 (34 years ago) in a situation where the Commercial Banks' Guarantee Fund and the Savings Banks' Guarantee Fund (now merged into the Banks' Guarantee Fund) both struggled during the financial crisis in the years around 1990.
