= Ikot Ekpene =

Town in Akwa Ibom state, Nigeria

- Town
- Nickname: I.K
- Motto: The Raffia City
- Interactive map of Ikot Ekpene
- Location in Nigeria
- Coordinates: 5°11′N 7°43′E
- Country: Nigeria
- State: Akwa Ibom

Government
  - Chairman: Mr. Aniefiok Nkom

Area
  - Total: 116 km^{2} (45 sq mi)

Population (2006 census)
  - Total: 143,077
  - Estimate (2022): 180,500
  - Density: 1,230/km^{2} (3,190/sq mi)

GDP (PPP, 2015 int. Dollar)
  - Year: 2023
  - Total: $3.5 billion
  - Per capita: $8,100
- Time zone: UTC+1 (WAT)
- Climate: Am
- Website: www.annangheritage.org https://www.raffiacityhub.com.ng

Ikot Ekpene,(audio) also known as The Raffia City, or IK in short form is a historic town in the south-southern state of Akwa Ibom, Nigeria. It is the political and cultural capital of the Annang ethnic group in Nigeria. The town is located on the A342 highway that parallels the coast, between Calabar to the southeast and Aba to the west, with the state capital, Uyo, on this road just to the east. Umuahia is the next major town to the north. The population of the Ikot Ekpene Local government area was estimated to be 180,500 in 2022.

Kannan Nair, the noted historian described the town as a cultural and political capital of the Annangs and the Ibibios. The Ibibios live to the east and most of the Annangs live to the south of the town.

Ikot Ekpene is known as a regional centre of commerce, with notable exports of palm products, especially palm oil, kernels, raffia products including raffia fibers and its wine, and ground crops of yams, cassava, taro, and corn. The population is made up primarily of the Annang people with a small number of Igbo traders and Hausa Suya vendors. Significant exports also include basket weaving, sculpture, and, most notably, raffia cane furniture (hence the colloquial name of the town).

Ikot Ekpene is also known for its technological innovations due to the emergence of FutureLabs an innovation hub dedicated to training young technical talents and helping entrepreneurs build tech startups in Ikot Ekpene in partnership with organizations like NITDA and JICA. The Raffia City Entrepreneurs Scheme committee was inaugurated by Hon. John Cleton Etim.

Ikot Ekpene is also the headquarters of some notable seminaries and the Catholic Diocese in the south-south region of Nigeria. The Akwa Ibom State Polytechnic, Ikot Osurua, and Ritman University is located in the city. The city houses the notable mini stadium at GRA road, Nteps Super Markets, Four Point by Sheraton Hotels etc.

== History ==
Oral history indicates that the Annangs first settled the area in the 16th century.

=== British era ===
Though most inhabitants of the area did not have direct contact with European traders who they called Mbakara until early in the twentieth century, it is believed that European articles of trade reached the people beginning in the 17th century.

In November 1903, British troops arrived in the area from Calabar and the following year established a garrison there in January 1904, putting Umoren Eyenobong (known as swordwearer by the Europeans) from Ukana in charge of the immediate Annang people. From Ikot Ekpene the troops marched to Uyo and from there to Abak and Opobo (now Ikot Abasi). Between 1904 and 1910, Ikot Ekpene became part of the Enyong District. In 1914 Enyong District was broken up into two: Enyong and Ikot Ekpene Districts. The new Ikot Ekpene District included Uyo and Abak with the headquarters in Ikot Ekpene town.

By 1919, trade with Europeans opened up as the town became an administrative centre. The following companies had posts and stores in the town: John Holt's, Cooperative Wholesale Society, Paterson Zochonis (PZ), G. B. Ollivant and the Compagnie Francaise de L'Afrique Occidentale. The establishment of these companies resulted in an exodus from the surrounding areas and made Ikot Ekpene a vibrant metropolis. In 1937, the colonial administration built the main market and separated those who sold imported European goods from indigenous articles. A slaughterhouse was added to allow for the inspection of meat.

In 1903, the British sent in troops and a garrison was stationed there at the main entrance to the town known as Control Post. The town was so important to the British that when a proposed road linking Owerri and Calabar in the late 1920s was to bypass the town, the British administrators abandoned the idea in favour of one linking Eket and Owerri in order to bring the town into the loop. It became the site of the experiment in local self-governance by the British in 1951. It was also the birthplace of the famous Ibibio Welfare Union when James Udo Eka teamed up with Udosen Obot at a Methodist school in Ikot Obong Edong.

Under the British, the town became the seat of both the (Annang) Division and (Ikot Ekpene) County Council. Today it is a municipal centre in the state of Akwa Ibom.

=== Independence era ===
Ikot Ekpene, probably more than any other town, was seriously impacted in the Biafrian civil war. It had strategic military and political importance to both the Biafrans and Nigerians. The town and the area changed hands at least 3 times in this bitter conflict. Following the war, the new reorganization and state structure led to policies that did not recognize the historic importance of the town as most of the Annang leaders were massacred during the war.

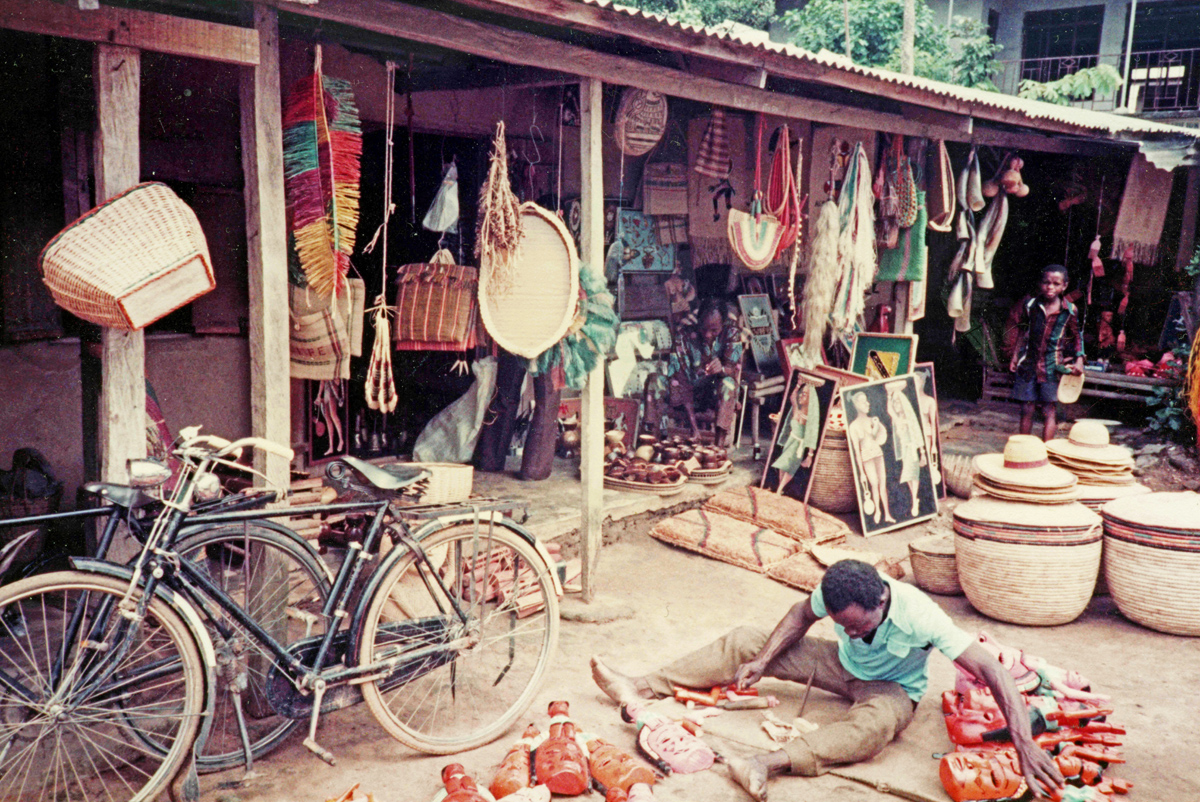
Section of Ikot Ekpene craft market showing woven raffia products for sale

Like most Annang communities, Ikot Ekpene has a tradition of self-improvement from its sons and daughters, both near and far. Several groups are working together to recapture and rebuild what they fondly call "The Raffia City". Ikot Ekpene has a long history of transforming the raffia fibre into cloth used in shoes, hats, handbags, mats and with distinctive cultural carvings made out of wood. These unique arts and crafts trades have continued alongside traditional agriculture.

Many foreign organizations and churches are present in the area. Four institutions of higher learning have added richness to the town: the Akwa Ibom State Polytechnic, Ikot Osurua, the School of Nursing, the St. Joseph Major Theological Seminary and Ritman University.

Notable places in Ikot Ekpene include: Four Points by Sheraton, Ikot Ekpene Township stadium and plaza, and the Akwaibom State polytechnic.

== Villages ==
Villages in the local government area include:

- Abak Ifia
- Abak Oko
- Abiakpo Edem Idim
- Abiakpo Ikot Essien
- Abiakpo Ikot Irem
- Abiakpo Ikot Obionting
- Abiakpo Ntak-Iyang
- Adaratak
- Akanaan
- Ata Essien Mbiaso
- Ibiakpan
- Ibiakpan Ikot
- Ibiakpan Nto Akan
- Ibiakpo Edem Idim
- Ibong Nto Akan
- Ifuho
- Ikot Abia Idem
- Ikot Idem
- Ikot Inyang
- Ikot Obong Edong
- Ikot Otu
- Ikot-Ekpene-Village
- Ikot Enwang
- Ikotobio Okpon
- Ikot Ubo
- Itak Ikot Udo-Okop
- Mbiaso
- Ndem Ekpot
- Nkap Ikot Obio Ebok
- Nsiak
- Obioekere
- Uruk Uso
- Utu Edem Usung
- Utu Ikot Ekrenyong
- Utu Ikot Essien
- Utu Ikpe

== Climate ==
It is more sunny from December to February. Rainfall is prevalent from May to October and least prevalent from December to February.

Muggy conditions are most common in May and least common in January. The best time of year for hot-weather activities is from late November to early February.

== Sports ==
The Ikot Ekpene Township Stadium is located in Ikot Ekpene.

The Ikot Ekpene stadium is now the host to The Nigerian National League team Ibom Youth FC. It was also a former ground for Akwa Starlet, now Dakkadda FC. It has several football teams such as Mashal Rock FC, Raffia City FC, Ituen FC, Police Academy, Ibom Stars etc.

Great players have come from this city, such as Etok Aniekan (Esperanza of Tunisia), Isaac George (Akwa United), Imoh Obot (Nassarawa United), and Vincent Enyeama (Marshall Rock to Lille of France, Super Eagles of Nigeria).

== Notable people ==
- Solomon Udo, professional footballer playing for the Armenia national football team.
- Mmekutmfon Essien, photographer

== Political Wards ==
Wards	Ward Centers
Ikot Ekpene 1	Primary School, Anwa Udo Akai
Ikot Ekpene 2	Holy Child Primary School, Sani Ogun
Ikot Ekpene 3	Methodist Primary School, Ibiakpan
Ikot Ekpene 4	St. Anne Primary School, Ikot Essien
Ikot Ekpene 5	Primary School, Abak Oko
Ikot Ekpene 6	Primary School Ekoi
Ikot Ekpene 7	Methodist Primary School, Ikot Inyang
Ikot Ekpene 8	Methodist Primary School, Ikot Abia Idem/ Ikot Enwang
Ikot Ekpene 9	Primary School, Ikot Osurua
Ikot Ekpene 10	Methodist Primary School, Amanyam
Ikot Ekpene 11	Primary School, Nto Obio Ekong
Ikot Ekpene 12	Primary School, Abak Ifia

== See also ==
- Annang Festival of Arts and Culture

== Bibliography ==
- Akpan, N. U. (1967). Epitaph to Indirect Rule: A Discourse on Local Government in Africa. London: Frank Cass & Co Ltd.
- Ekanem, J. B. (2002). Clashing Cultures: Annang Not(with)standing Christianity – An Ethnography. Brussels: Peter Lang.
- Ette, E. (2020). Acculturative Stress and Change in Nigerian Society. Landham, Maryland: Lexington Books.
- Ette, E. (2010). Annang Wisdom: Tools for Post Modern Living. Bloomington: Indiana Xlibris.
- Nair, Kaanan K. (1972). Politics and Society in South Eastern Nigeria, 1841 – 1906. London: Frank Cass.
- Noah, Effiong (1988). Minutes of the Ibibio State Union. Uyo: Modern Business Press.
- Nwaka, G. I. (1986). "The 'Leopard' Killings of Southern Annang, Nigeria, 1943–48". Africa. 56 (4): 417–440.
- Udo, E. U. (1983). The History of the Annang People, Cross River State, Nigeria. Calabar, Nigeria: Apcon Press Ltd.
