= Atakpo Festival =

Festival in Nigeria

Gani Atakpo Festival
- Language: Ibibio

Origin
- Region of origin: Akwa Ibom, Nigeria

Atakpo Festival is an annual festival celebrated by the people of Akwa-Ibom specifically by the Uruan clan in honour of their god The aim of this celebration is to reinforce the proliferation of Uruan cultural heritage This annual festival is being organised in Uruan Local Government, one of the local government in Akwa-Ibom State, Nigeria
