= Buckra =

Derogatory term for white people

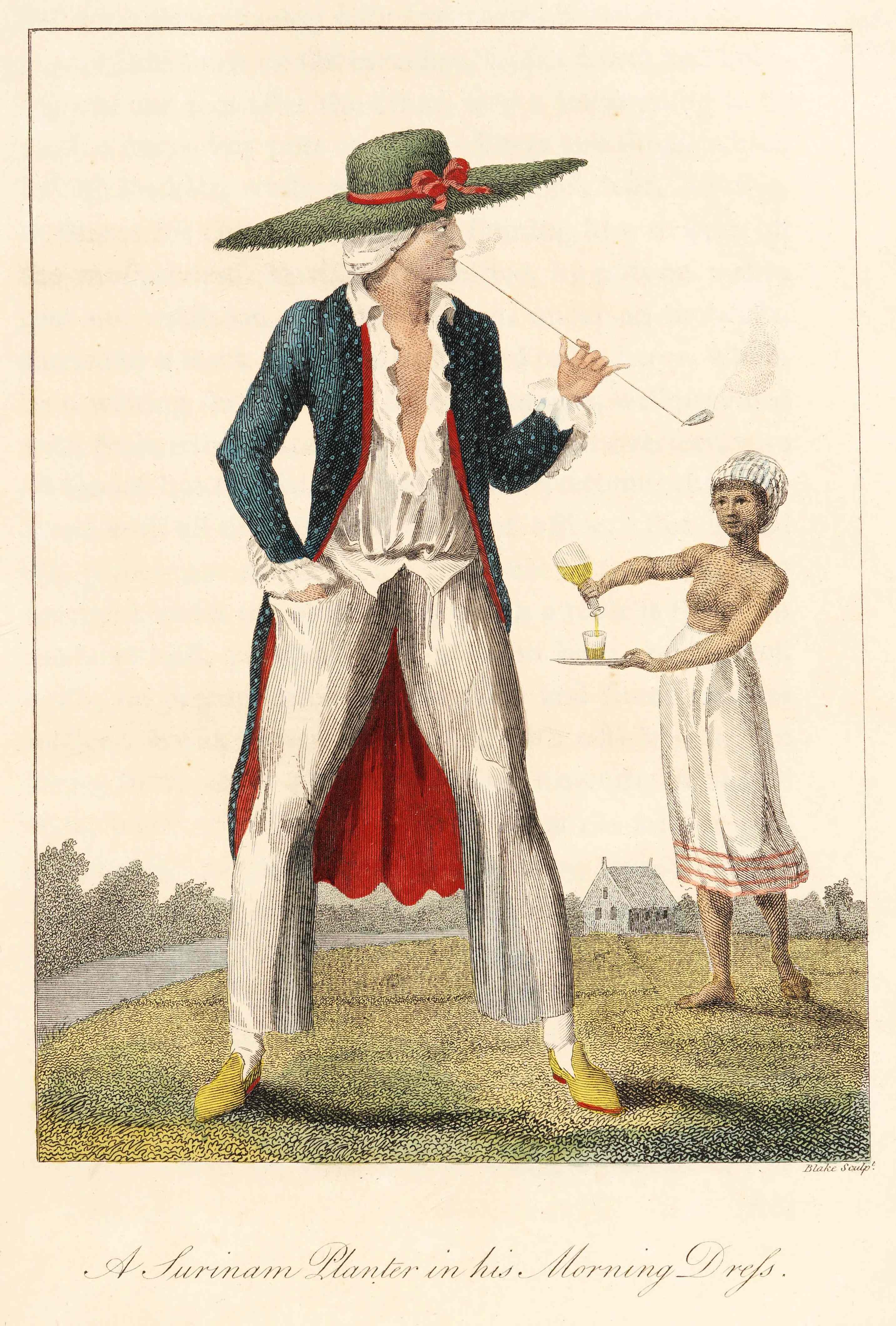
A Surinam Planter in his Morning Dress, 1796

Buckra or Backra is a term of West African origin. It is mainly used in the Caribbean and the Southeast United States. Originally, it was used by slaves to address their white owners. Later, the meaning was broadened to generally describe white people.

== Etymology ==
"Buckra" has been found in many variants, successively bacceroe, bochara, backra, baccra, bakra, buckera, buckra, bockra, and more. It probably derives from the Ibibio and Efik Annang word mbakara, meaning (white) European or master. It is thought to have emerged during the 17th or 18th century colonial period of slavery, when enslaved people were transported from West Africa and Central Africa to plantations in the Caribbean owned by European colonizers.

Initially, it was used by enslaved people to address their white owners and their overseers. Later, the meaning was broadened to generally describe white people. After the abolition of slavery, the word survived to refer to white people, usually used by black people in the US in derogatory meaning.

== In the Caribbean ==
From about the 16th century, enslaved West Africans, notably Igbo and Ibibio, were shipped to Jamaica to work on plantations. A book by Allen Eric about Jamaica, published in 1896, is titled "Buckra" Land — Two Weeks in Jamaica. It mentions the word buckra, "meaning man", used by Jamaican black people to greet strangers. In Jamaican Patois, both Bakra and Backra are translated as (white) enslaver. In Jamaica, the written form and educated pronunciation is "buckra"; in folk pronunciation, "backra" similar to the source "mbakara". In the French West Indies island of Martinique, descendants of white settlers and slave owners are until today called "békés" (pronounced "baykay"), which is also thought to be derived from mbakara.

In Sranan Tongo, a creole language in the former Dutch colony Suriname, the term occurs as bakra, originally referring to the white slave-owner on a plantation, or a white master in general. Nowadays, it primarily refers to a Dutch white person but may also generally mean a white person.

Also in Guyana, the original meaning was white plantation owner, later a white person, or even an important non-white.

== Poor buckras ==
Barbados has a history of colonization and slavery, too. From the 1630s, when Barbados had become an English colony, large numbers of poor indentured Irish people were brought to Barbados to work on sugar plantations. Other whites, such as military prisoners, widows, and orphans, brought to plantation owners to work in the fields were shipped to the Caribbean, effectively as poorly paid and treated servants and workers. In Barbados, these endogamous poor, white-skinned people were also called "poor backras" or "buckras".

== Use in the United States ==
In the second half of the 17th century, tens of thousands of indentured settlers of Barbados migrated to the other colonies when they did not receive the property that they were indentured to earn. Many moved on to the North American mainland. South Carolina, particularly, was founded by settlers from Barbados who brought many enslaved Africans with them. These slaves spoke an English-based Creole language that later became known as Gullah. This Creole developed because enslaved Africans in coastal South Carolina had limited contact with Whites or Blacks from other areas of the South. This Creole is still spoken today by descendants of the Gullah people in the South Carolina and Georgia low-country region.

Today, "buckra" is still used in the Southeast United States by descendants of slaves, most notably the Gullah people, referring to white people. It refers especially to the poor, although the buckras were, in the eyes of the enslaved black people, the wealthy class in former times:

"De nigger was de right arm of de buckra class. The buckra was de horn of plenty for de nigger. Both suffer in consequence of freedom."...(Moses Lyles, a former slave in South Carolina, speaking in the 1930s). As noted in this 1916 publication, there was also the poor white level of buckra, referred to by both Southern races as "poor buckras"...locally pronounced "po' buckras".

== See also ==
- List of English words of Niger-Congo origin
