= Békés (disambiguation) =

Békés may refer to:

- the town Békés
- Békés County
- the historical comitatus Békés County (former)
- "békés", plural of the Creole term for descendants of European colonialists (especially in the Antilles)
