= Singapore Savings Bonds =

Singapore Savings Bonds (SSBs) are a type of Singapore Government Securities that are issued for investors who want to participate in the Singapore Government Securities (SGS) market but in smaller denominations.

== Features ==
SSBs can be purchased in multiples of $500 and mature after 10 years. Unlike an ordinary 10-year bond, however, SSBs can be redeemed in any month for the face value of the bond plus accrued interest. Interest on SSBs comes with a step-up component each year, calculated in such a way that holding an SSB for N years (N <= 10) generates very nearly the same return as an ordinary bond with a remaining maturity of N years bought at the same time and held to maturity. In this way, interest-rate risk is eliminated. Investors are restricted to a maximum holding of S$200,000 worth of SSBs at any point of time.Monetary Authority of Singapore

== Risk-Free Investment ==
SSBs are not transferable, but the fact that they can be redeemed in any month for the face value of the bond plus accrued interest eliminates the interest-rate risk which is inherent in an ordinary bond (if interest rates rise, an ordinary bond loses value). The bonds are guaranteed by the government of Singapore.

== Alternative to Singapore Fixed Deposits ==
SSBs are seen as alternatives to Singapore fixed deposits which are offered by banks or finance companies. This is due to the fact that before SSBs were issued, most Singaporeans had no access to the SGS market due to the high minimum denominations and preference for institutional investors. Hence, fixed deposits became the preferred choice for Singaporeans to store their savings as they offer relatively higher interest rates as compared to an average savings account and yet are covered by Singapore's deposit insurance up to a maximum of $100,000 for each bank or finance company. SSBs are completely covered by government guarantee, limited only by the maximum amount of SSBs an individual may hold (currently S$200,000).
