= Crédit Martiniquais =

Former bank in Martinique, France

- Company type: Private company
- Industry: Financial services
- Founded: 1922
- Defunct: 1996
- Fate: Collapsed
- Headquarters: Fort-de-France, Martinique
- Area served: Martinique
- Products: Banking services

The Crédit Martiniquais was a commercial bank based in Fort-de-France, Martinique, France. It was founded in 1922 and collapsed in the late 1990s.

== History ==
The Crédit Martiniquais was colloquially known as the "bank of the békés" for its links with the local establishment of white merchant families who collectively held three-quarters of its capital. It was the only bank providing financial services in some parts of Martinique.

Its expansion to Guadeloupe, Guyane and Paris was associated with financial overextension and ultimately collapse. The bank was liquidated with financial support from the French Fonds de Garantie des Dépôts (FGD) which was created on that occasion. At the end of 1999, its banking operations were taken over by BRED Banque populaire.

By the time of its collapse in 1996, the Crédit Martiniquais held 14 percent of savings and provided 20 percent of loans on the island.

The FGD sued the former management of Crédit Martiniquais for liability in the failure, but eventually lost the case in 2014.

== See also ==
- Banque de la Martinique
- List of banks in France
