= Korea Deposit Insurance Corporation =

South Korean deposit insurer

- 예금보험공사

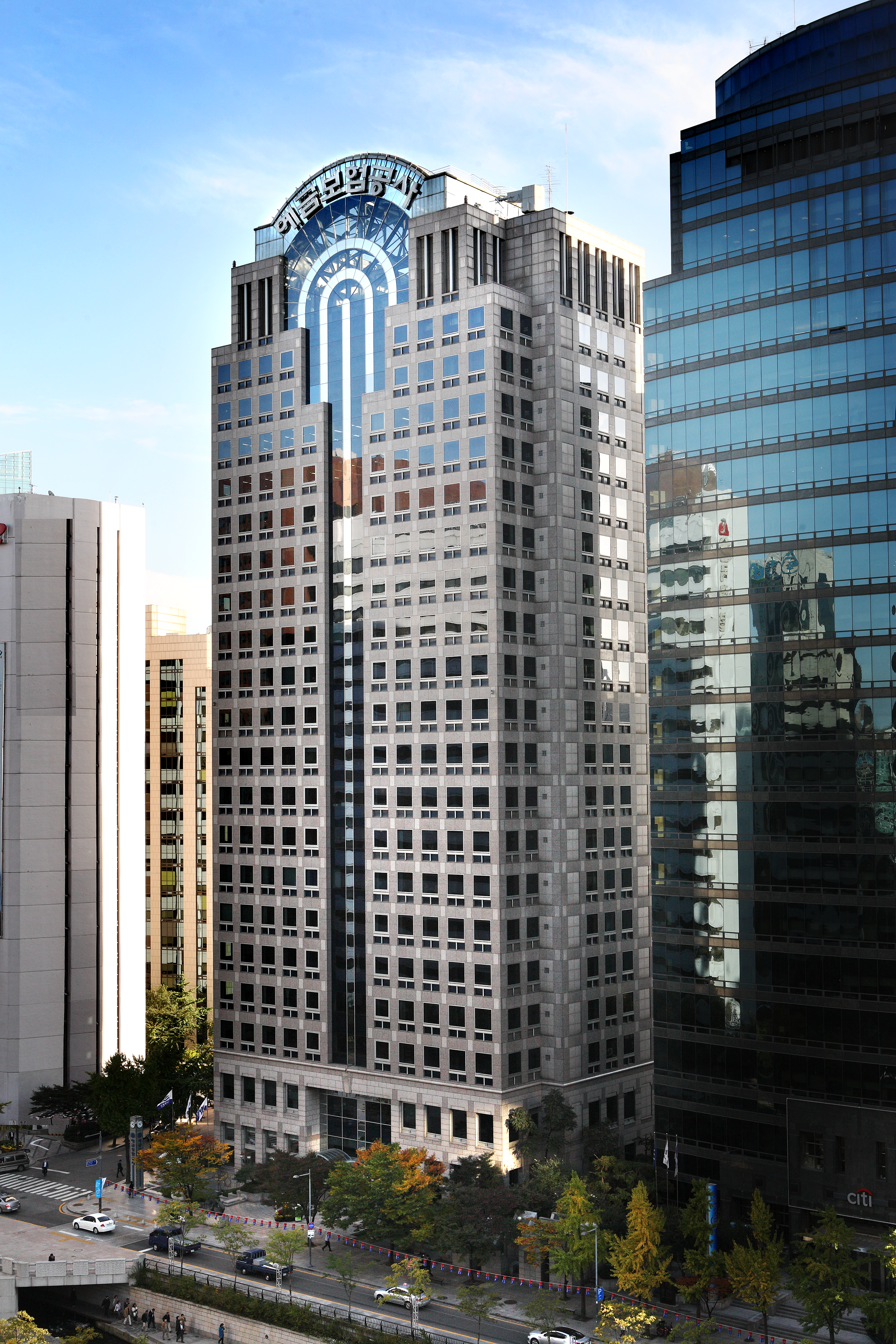
- KDIC headquarter along Cheonggyecheon in Downtown Seoul

Agency overview
- Formed: June 1, 1996; 30 years ago
- Headquarters: Jung District, Seoul, South Korea; 37.5685087°N 126.9807429°E
- Agency executive: Kim Seong-Sik, President
- Parent agency: Financial Services Commission
- Website: www.kdic.or.kr/english/index.jsp

Korean name
- Hangul: 예금보험공사
- Hanja: 預金保險公社
- RR: Yegeum boheom gongsa
- MR: Yegŭm pohŏm kongsa

The Korea Deposit Insurance Corporation (KDIC) is a South Korean deposit insurance corporation, established in 1996 to protect depositors and maintain the stability of the financial system. The main functions of KDIC are insurance management, risk surveillance, resolution, recovery, and investigation.

== Historical highlights ==
The Depositor Protection Act was enacted on December 29, 1995, and the KDIC established on June 1, 1996. The KDIC began its operations as a deposit insurer on January 1, 1997, collecting The first deposit insurance premiums on April 30 that year.

The first Deposit Insurance Fund Bond was issued on January 3, 1998, and on April 1 deposit insurance funds were consolidated under the management of the KDIC. The Resolution Finance Corporation (RFC) was established on December 27, 1999.

=== 2001 ===
- Jan. 01 Limited Coverage System was reinstated.
- Dec. 24 The Special Investigation Mission began its operations.

=== 2002 ===
- May. 06 The KDIC Joined the International Association of Deposit Insurers (IADI) as a founding member.

=== 2003 ===
- Jan. 01 The New Deposit Insurance Fund was created.
- Mar. 25 MOU with the Central Deposit Insurance Corporation (CDIC) was signed.
- Sep. 04 MOU for joint examination of financial institutions with the Financial Supervisory Service (FSS) was signed.

=== 2004 ===
- Jan. 01 Credit Unions were excluded from deposit insurance coverage.

=== 2006 ===
- Jun. 14 The KDIC hosted the International Open House 2006.
- Jun. 16 Letter of Intent (LOI) for mutual cooperation with the Deposit Insurance Corporation of Japan (DICJ) was signed.
- Oct. 31 MOU with the Deposit Insurance of Vietnam (DIV) was signed.
- Dec. 18 Agreement with the Financial Services Compensation Scheme (FSCS) for mutual cooperation and communication was signed.

=== 2007 ===
- Nov. 16 MOU with the United States Federal Deposit Insurance Corporation (FDIC) was signed.

=== 2008 ===
- Nov. 23 Foreign currency denominated deposits were included in the coverage.

=== 2009 ===
- Jan. 01 The Target Fund System came into force.
- Mar. 24 MOU with the Deposit Insurance Agency (DIA) of Russian Federation was signed.
- May. 27 Mr. Lee Seung-Woo was appointed as the 7th Chairman & President.
- Jun. 06 Retirement Pension products were included in the coverage.
- Nov. 11 The Resolution Finance Corporation (RFC) was closed.

=== 2010 ===
- May. 28 MOU with the Deposit Insurance of Vietnam (DIV) was renewed.
- Nov. 19 MOU with the Indonesia Deposit Insurance Corporation (IDIC) was signed.

=== 2012 ===
- Oct. 9 KDIC sold around $550 million worth of shares in Korea Electric Power Corporation.

=== 2014 ===
- Jan. Risk-based deposit insurance premiums came into force.
- May. KDIC obtained authority of joint examination of financial institutions and right to order for corrective measures.

=== 2015 ===
- Feb. Deposits in DC (Defined Contribution) retirement pension and IRP (Individual Retirement Pension) are separately protected, coverage up to KRW 50 million.

== The Basis for the KDIC's Mandates and Powers ==
=== The Depositor Protection Act ===
The KDIC's mandates and powers come from the Deposit Protection Act (DPA) which was enacted in Dec. 1995. The purpose of this Act is to contribute to the protection of depositors and maintenance of the stability of the financial system by efficiently operating a deposit insurance system, etc. in order to prevent a situation in which a failed institution is unable to reimburse its depositors. The DPA has an Enforcement Decree as a supporting legislation. The Decree is designed to provide for matters delegated by the DPA and those necessary for its enforcement.

=== The Special Act on the Management of Public Funds ===
To ensure efficient use of public funds as well as to minimize the financial burden on citizens, the Special Act on the Management of Public Funds was enacted in Dec. 2000. The Act lays out how to enhance the objectivity, fairness and transparency of fund raising and management.

=== Other Acts ===
Other laws that provide the basis for the KDIC's mandates and powers include the Act on the Structural Improvement of the Financial Industry, and the Act on the Fund for Repayment of Public Funds.

== The Execution of Mandates and Powers ==
=== The Deposit Insurance Committee ===
The Deposit Insurance Committee is the highest decision-making body of the KDIC. As such, it deliberates and renders decisions on key matters. It is composed of seven individuals including the President of the KDIC (Chairman), the Vice Chairman of the Financial Services Commission, the Vice Minister of the Ministry of Strategy and Finance and the Senior Deputy Governor of the Bank of Korea. The three remaining committee members are appointees commissioned directly by the Financial Services Commission and the other two are recommended by the Minister of the Ministry of Strategy and Finance and the Governor of the Bank of Korea.

=== The Board of Directors ===
The Board of Directors, as the highest executive body of the KDIC, is composed of one President, one Executive Vice President, four internal Executive Directors, and seven non-Executive Directors. The auditor may express opinions at Board meetings, but cannot participate in the Board's voting process.

=== Organizational structure ===
As of the end of Sep. 2010, the KDIC is composed of ten departments, five offices and one bureau. The total number of employees stands at 563. This number included general employees, and special employees such as attorneys, doctoral researchers, conservators, bankruptcy estate trustees, examiners, etc.

== Main roles ==
=== Policy and fund management ===
The KDIC implements deposit insurance policies and manages funds. The funds in the KDIC are divided into the Deposit Insurance Fund Bond Redemption Fund and the (New) Deposit Insurance Fund (DIF). The Redemption Fund was established to complete the financial restructuring and recover public funds injected during the first and second rounds of financial assistance following the 1997 East Asian financial crisis. The new DIF could start with a clean state from then. The annual premium revenue of the DIF in 2009 was KRW 1.24 trillion.

=== Ongoing risk surveillance ===
The KDIC identifies troubled financial institutions through on and off-site monitoring and requests financial institutions or supervisory authorities to take appropriate actions to prevent failure.

=== Support of insolvent financial institutions ===
The KDIC supports an insolvent financial institution in accordance with the following four principles: Least Cost Principle, Loss-Sharing Principle, Self-Help Effort Principle and Transparency/Objectivity Principle. And the KDIC usually uses one of two methods: deposit payoff and financial assistance. Financial assistance includes loan extension and fund deposit, purchase of assets and assumption of liabilities, equity investment and contributions.

=== Resolution of failed financial institutions ===
The KDIC resolves a failed financial institution in the least costly manner. Employing a variety of measures from deposit payoff, to purchase & assumption, to the establishment of a bridge bank and to an open bank assistance, the KDIC tries to make the resolution process as orderly and timely as possible. The total number of insured institutions stood at 320, and the amount of insured deposits totaled KRW 2,037,830 billion. (Figures as of June 2009) The coverage limit is KRW 50 million, which is almost USD 45,000, including the principal and interest.

=== Recovery of public funds ===
For efficient recovery of public funds injected in insolvent financial institutions, the KDIC can have its staff act as a manager or a trustee of such institutions. Also, the KDIC has the authority to file a liability suit or a damage claim on behalf of insolvent financial institutions.

=== Investigation ===
The KDIC pursues liability claims against former/incumbent employees of insolvent financial institutions for their role in the failure. It also conducts investigations of owners, employees, etc. of default debtor corporations who failed to pay back the money they owed and thus are partially responsible for the insolvency. In addition, the KDIC conducts thorough investigations of concealed properties of insolvency-implicated parties to secure the assets for damage claims against them.

== Protection of Deposits ==
=== Types of Insured Institutions ===
The KDIC insures banks, financial investment companies, life and non-life insurance companies, merchant banks and mutual savings banks. As of the end of 2009, 321 financial institutions' products were under the protection of the KDIC.

=== Insurance Coverage ===
The KDIC insures bank deposits, customer's deposits for securities trading, individual insurance policies, etc. On the other hand, the KDIC does not insure CDs, RPs, securities, CPs, etc. Also, the deposit insurance excludes deposits by government and insured financial institutions, etc. from its insured products.

=== Coverage Limit ===
The KDIC covers up to 50 million won ($42,823) per depositor. It is 2.5 times of Korea's per capita GDP ($17,074) (Statistics are as of the end of 2009.)

=== Insurance Premium ===
The premium rates are determined on the basis of the average annual balance of deposits in each sector. The rates are 0.08% for banks, 0.15% for financial investment companies, insurance companies and merchant banks and 0.35% for mutual savings banks.

== International Cooperation ==
=== MOUs ===
The KDIC currently has MOUs on Information Sharing and Mutual Cooperation with nine deposit insurers worldwide.

== Seoul Guarantee Insurance Company ==
Seoul Guarantee Insurance Company (SGIC, 서울보증보험) is a financial services company incorporated in South Korea. Headquartered in Seoul, SGIC is the largest provider of surety and trade credit insurance. It is fully owned by Korea Deposit Insurance Corporation, a government institution that insures bank deposits. The company was formed after the merger between Hankuk and Korea Fidelity and Surety Corporation during the economic crisis that hit Korea in 1998. A mass layoff and restructuring followed.

== Gallery ==
Original logo of KDIC (1996–2016)

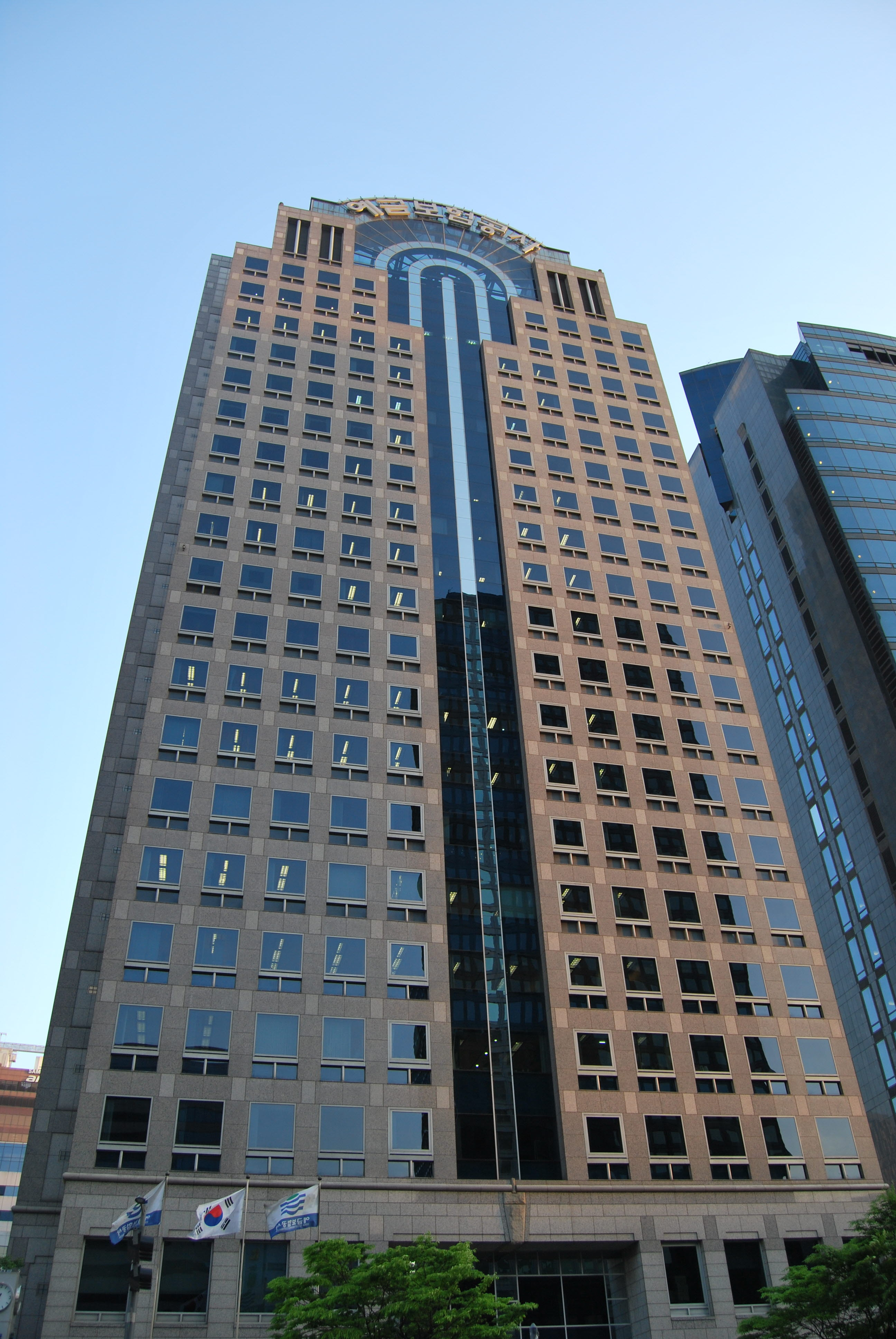
Look of the KDIC building with old logo

== See also ==
- List of financial supervisory authorities by country
