= CDIC =

CDIC can refer to:

- Canada Deposit Insurance Corporation
- China Deposit Insurance Corporation
- Central Deposit Insurance Corporation in Taiwan
- Chaland de débarquement d'infanterie et de chars

== See also ==
- Canada Development Investment Corporation, initialed as CDEV
- Central Commission for Discipline Inspection
