= Spar- und Leihkasse Thun =

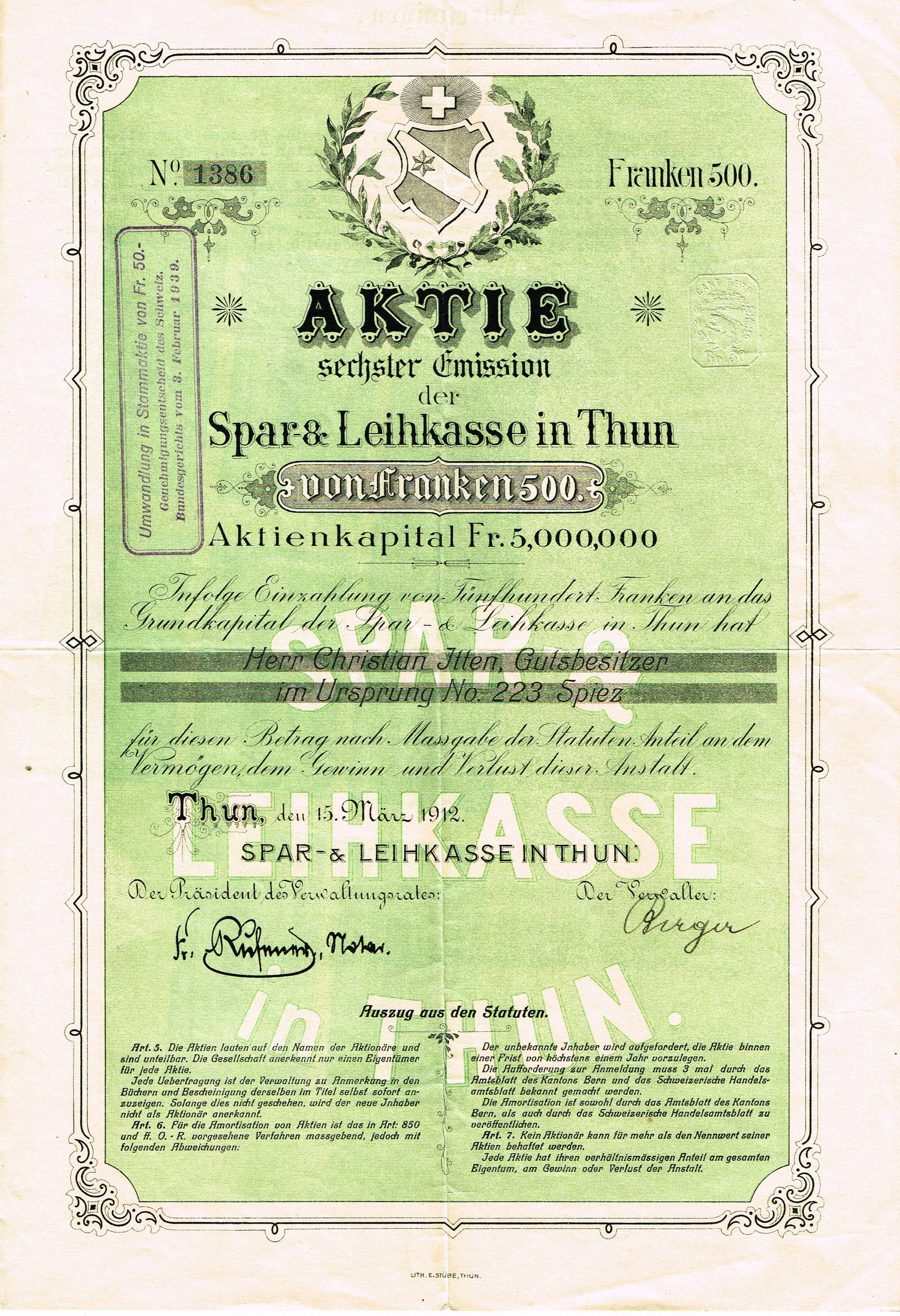
- A 500 Swiss francs share of the Spar- und Leihkasse Thun (1912), 6th issue
- Company type: Savings and loan bank
- Industry: Financial services
- Founded: 1866
- Defunct: 1993
- Headquarters: Thun, Switzerland

The Spar- und Leihkasse Thun (SLT) was a Swiss regional savings and loan bank located in Thun, Switzerland. It collapsed in the autumn of 1991 and was the first notable bank run in that country. The failure of SLT eclipsed all previous troubles of Swiss banks. Though some Swiss banks experienced troubles in the 1970s, the Swiss deposit insurance only had to pay out a total of 700,000 Swiss francs in two bank failures before the collapse of the Spar- und Leihkasse Thun.

== History ==
During the late 1980s, the Swiss economy overheated and real estate prices skyrocketed. The SLT, whose portfolio contained an oversized amount of mortgages, was not prepared for a burst of the real-estate bubble.

After local media reported on the bank's financial situation on October 3, 1991, throngs of people converged on the SLT main office, and an SLT customer suffered a deadly cardiac infarction. After a few days, the customers were allowed to withdraw 500 Swiss francs each (639 CHF in 2023, adjusted for inflation).

In the end, more than 6300 persons lost more than a third of their wealth, and the collapse destroyed more than 220 million Swiss francs of savings and investing funds. After the bank's assets were legally liquidated in January 1993, the Swiss deposit insurance paid out the then-time maximum sum of 30,000 Swiss francs per account. Following the SLT debacle, the payouts were then lowered to 30,000 Swiss francs per bank customer, and raised to 100,000 CHF per bank customer in 2008.

== Literature ==
- Juker, Werner (1966). Geschichte der Spar- und Leihkasse Thun - 1866-1966 : Festschrift zu ihrem 100jährigen Bestehen [History of the Spar- und Leihkasse Thun - 1866-1966: Festschrift for its 100-year Existence] (in German). Spar- und Leihkasse Thun.
- Ainouz, Amir Alain (2022). The regulation of deposit guarantee schemes in Switzerland and the United States - a tale of two systems. doi:10.3256/978-3-03929-015-4. ISBN 978-3-03891-383-2. S2CID 246317484., pp. 72-73
