= Agency of Deposit Compensation of Belarus =

Belarusian organization

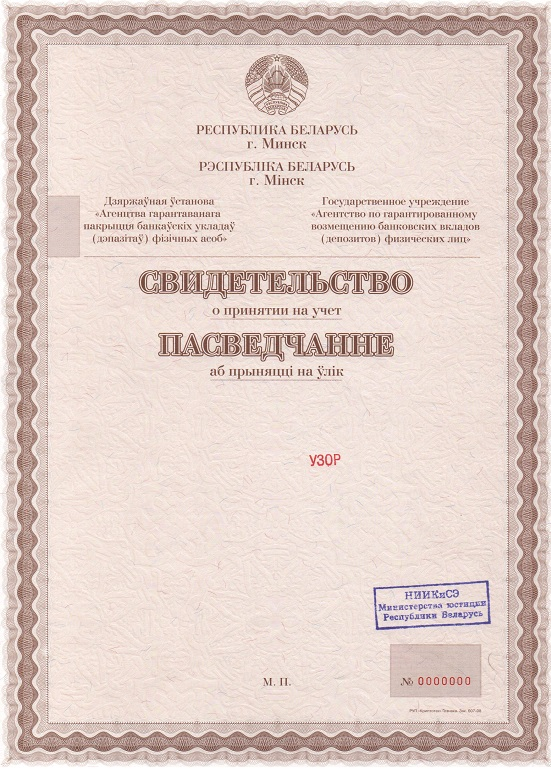
Certificate of Registration

The Agency of Deposit Compensation, ADC (Belarusian: Агенцтва гарантаванага пакрыцьця банкаўскіх укладаў (дэпазытаў) фізычных асобаў, АГПБУ, romanized: Ahienctva harantavanaha pakryćcia bankaŭskich ukladaŭ (depazytaŭ) fizyčnych asobaŭ, AHPBU) is a Belarusian government agency providing deposit insurance for the deposits of natural persons. It was established in December 2008 in compliance with Belarusian laws. Yauhen Yawlashkin was appointed as its general director.

Each deposit-taking financial institution in Belarus, is required to be registered with the ADC.

An unlimited state guarantee was announced on 31 July 2008 (excluding deposits belonging to individuals registered as sole traders). Interest yields insurance is not guaranteed by the law.

The Agency of Deposit Compensation is a public institution and is accountable to the Council of Ministers of Belarus and to National Bank of Belarus.
