= Annang Festival of Arts and Culture =

Festival celebrated in South Southern Nigeria

- Language: Annang

Origin
- Region of origin: Akwa Ibom, Nigeria

The Annang Festival of Arts and Culture is celebrated in Ikot Ekpene, Akwa Ibom, a region located in South Southern Nigeria. The festival was initiated in 2016, in order to preserve the Anaañ history, language and culture. The festival aims at preventing the Annang tradition and its cultural heritage from undergoing extinction. It showcase and promote the rich natural endowments of Annang land in Akwa Ibom State. The festival also has a registered foundation referred to as the Annang Festival of Arts and Culture Foundation.

== History ==
The festival was organised in 2016 by Annang Heritage Preservation and has since then grown, attracting tourists and fun seekers from beyond Nigeria. It is usually celebrated in the entire 8 local government areas that make up Annang clan. The first edition was held at Ikot-Ekpene local government area, the raffia city, which is the capital of the Annang people. It took place from the 12th of December 2016 to the 19th of December, 2016. They hosted over 10,000 people daily in the 2016 edition of the festival.

The 2017 edition of the festival was held for four days, starting from 14 December 2017 to 17 December 2017. It was held at Ikot-Ekpene township Stadium, Ikot Ekpene, Awka-Ibom State.

In November 2018, they incorporated the Annang Festival of Arts and Culture Foundation. This foundation is located at Ikot, Epene, Akwa-Ibom.

The Annang Festival of Arts and Culture held in 2019, the third festival of its sort to be held, was hosted in both the Township stadium of Ikot Ekpene and the Unit Ekpene Plaza in Akwa State. The 2019 festival abided by the tagline "Harnessing Annang Cultural Assets for Economic Gain" and was held from December 20 to 22, 2019. Annang Organizations, such as the Nto Annang Foundation (NAF), joined together in hosting the festival in 2019.

The Nigerian Tourism Development Corporation (NTDC), the National Council for Arts and Culture (NCAC), and the Akwa Ibom State Ministry of Culture and Tourism all supported the 2019 festival.

Some of the activities held at the event included an Ujai beauty pageant, a masquerade dance showcase, an arts and crafts exhibition, an Annang warrior parade, and a drum-based orchestra.

== Festivity ==
The Annang Festival of Arts and Culture is a three day festival that features many cultural activities. These include: 800 spectacular masquerades display; Annang warriors trek, drum ensemble of over 5, 000 extinct African drums; art exhibition and colloquium/cocktail party for VIP and foreign envoys. The Annang people have great tradition in music and are renowned in arts and sculpture. Other Side attraction of the festival includes;

The popular tradition Ekpo Masquerade, Annang Language competition, the unveiling of the Annang hall of fame, the display of Annang food in their varieties, the Unek Annang dance and cultural procession. Also some other activities engaged in are Ujai Annang beauty pageant; Annang language essay competition; Annang hall of fame induction ceremonies; inauguration of children royal troupe; and festival theme song/Annang ballad.
