= Delphine Fawundu =

American artist

Adama Delphine Fawundu
- Born: 1971 (age 54–55); Brooklyn, NY
- Education: Stony Brook University - BA., Columbia University - MFA.
- Known for: Photography, Interdisciplinarity
- Spouse: Howard Buford

Adama Delphine Fawundu (born 1971) Adama Delphine Fawundu is an artist born in Brooklyn, NY the ancestral space of the Lenni-Lanape. She is a descendant of the Mende, Krim, Bamileke, and Bubi peoples. Her multi-sensory artistic language centers around themes of indigenization and ancestral memory. Fawundu co-published the critically acclaimed book MFON: Women Photographers of the African Diaspora with photographer Laylah Amatullah Barrayn. – MFON is a book featuring the diverse works of women and non-binary photographers of African descent. Her works have been presented in numerous exhibitions worldwide. She is a Professor of Visual Arts at Columbia University.

== Biography ==
Adama Delphine Fawundu was born in Brooklyn, NY, US, in a family with an Equatorial Guinean Bubi mother and Sierra Leonean Krim father. She was the first child in the family born in the United States. She grew up in Prospect Park, New York and lived in Flatbush, New York during her career.

Fawundu graduated from the Stony Brook University with a Bachelor of Arts in Liberal Studies/Mass Communications, African American Studies. During her study she contributed to the bi-weekly student newspaper "Blackworld". Later she studied at New York University, where received a Master of Arts in Media Ecology. She completed her MFA in Visual Arts from Columbia University in 2018.

Fawundu is married to Howard Buford and has three sons with him: Amal Buford, Che Ali Buford (alumna of the New York Philharmonic, composer) and Ras Kofi Buford.

== Work ==
Fawundu started her artistic path as a photographer, working in this field since 1993. As her work developed, the range of media she worked in expanded until it embraced new artistic techniques – printmaking, video, sound and assemblage. Fawundu incorporates elements of biography and geography, philosophy and mythology, as well as individual and collective experience, to reflect on different social issues, mostly concentrating on the history and reality of the African Diaspora.

A significant part of Fawundu's early career is her hip hop photography work. She started out working with The Source, Vibe and Beat Down Magazines, work that extended into a 10-year journey documenting hip-hop culture and urban music of the African Continent. In 1995, on assignment for Beat Down magazine, Fawundu photographed Prodigy and Havoc of Mobb Deep for their second album The Infamous.

Beginning in 2008, Fawundu documented hip hop, Afro-pop, and urban youth culture in Accra (Ghana), Bamako (Mali), Dakar (Senegal), Addis Abbaba (Ethiopia), Johannesburg (South Africa), Nairobi (Kenya), Freetown (Sierra Leone), and Lagos (Nigeria).

In 2015, Fawundu participated in the LagosPhoto Festival with the project "Deconstructing She," using herself as the subject to address stereotypes and prejudice over remnants of slavery.

In 2016–17, along with eight other artists, Fawundu presented her work as part of the exhibition "Black Magic: AfroPasts/AfroFutures." Her installation "In the Face of History" is a wall of documents showing the oppression of various social groups, among them women and African Americans. The installation was also shown as a part of the exhibition "In Plain Sight/Site" in 2019, and was highly acclaimed by many reviewers.

In 2017, along with Laylah Amatullah Barrayan, she independently published a book and a journal titled "MFON: Women Photographers of the African Diaspora," representing works of over a hundred female photographers of African descent from all over the world. It was named in honor of the late photographer Mmekutmfon "Mfon" Essien.

The critically acclaimed book resulted in Fawundu going on a book tour which included events at the Tate Modern, Schomburg Center for Research in Black Culture, International Center of Photography, Harvard University and other institutions. In 2019 the co-authors were invited to a talk at a photographic festival in Los Angeles, Photoville, organized by the nonprofit organization United Photo Industries. The book can be found in many libraries around the world, including the Victoria & Albert Museum, Columbia University, the New York Public Library and Harvard University.

In 2019, Fawundu presented her show "The sacred star of Isis and other stories". She used mixed media photographic works to explore the relationship between traditional Mende beliefs from Sierra Leone and modern world values. The work was exhibited at two locations nationwide – at the African American Museum in Philadelphia and Crush Curatorial gallery in Chelsea, New York City. It is currently to be seen at the Museum of African Diaspora.

Fawundu's latest solo exhibit – "No Wahala, It's All Good: A Spiritual Cypher within the Hip-Hop Diaspora" – combines her early hip hop works with recent documentation of hip hop and urban music on the African continent, representing the cultural connection between Africa and its diaspora.

Fawundu's photography and art works are exhibited in numerous private and public collections including the Brooklyn Museum of Art, New York; the Brooklyn Historical Society, New York; Corridor Gallery, New York; the Museum of Contemporary Photography, Chicago; David C. Driskell Center at the University of Maryland; the Museum of Contemporary Art at the University of São Paulo, Brazil; the Norton Museum of Art in Villa La Pietra, Italy; the Brighton Photo Biennial, United Kingdom, and others.

== Awards and recognition ==
Adama Delphine Fawundu has received numerous awards, including:

- Photography Fellowship from the New York Foundation for the Arts (2016)
- Emerging Artist Award from the Rema Hort Mann Foundation (2018)
- BRIC Workspace artist-in-residence (2018)
- Center for Book Arts artist-in-residence (2019)
- Anonymous Was A Woman Award (2021)
- Brooklyn Historical Society Community Initiative Grant

She was also on the list of the following rankings:

- OkayAfrica’s 100 Women making an impact on Africa and its Diaspora (2018)
- Royal Photographic Society’s (UK) Hundred Heroines (2018)
