= Fondo de Garantía de Depósitos =

Spanish government deposit guarantee scheme

Deposit Guarantee Fund of Credit Institutions
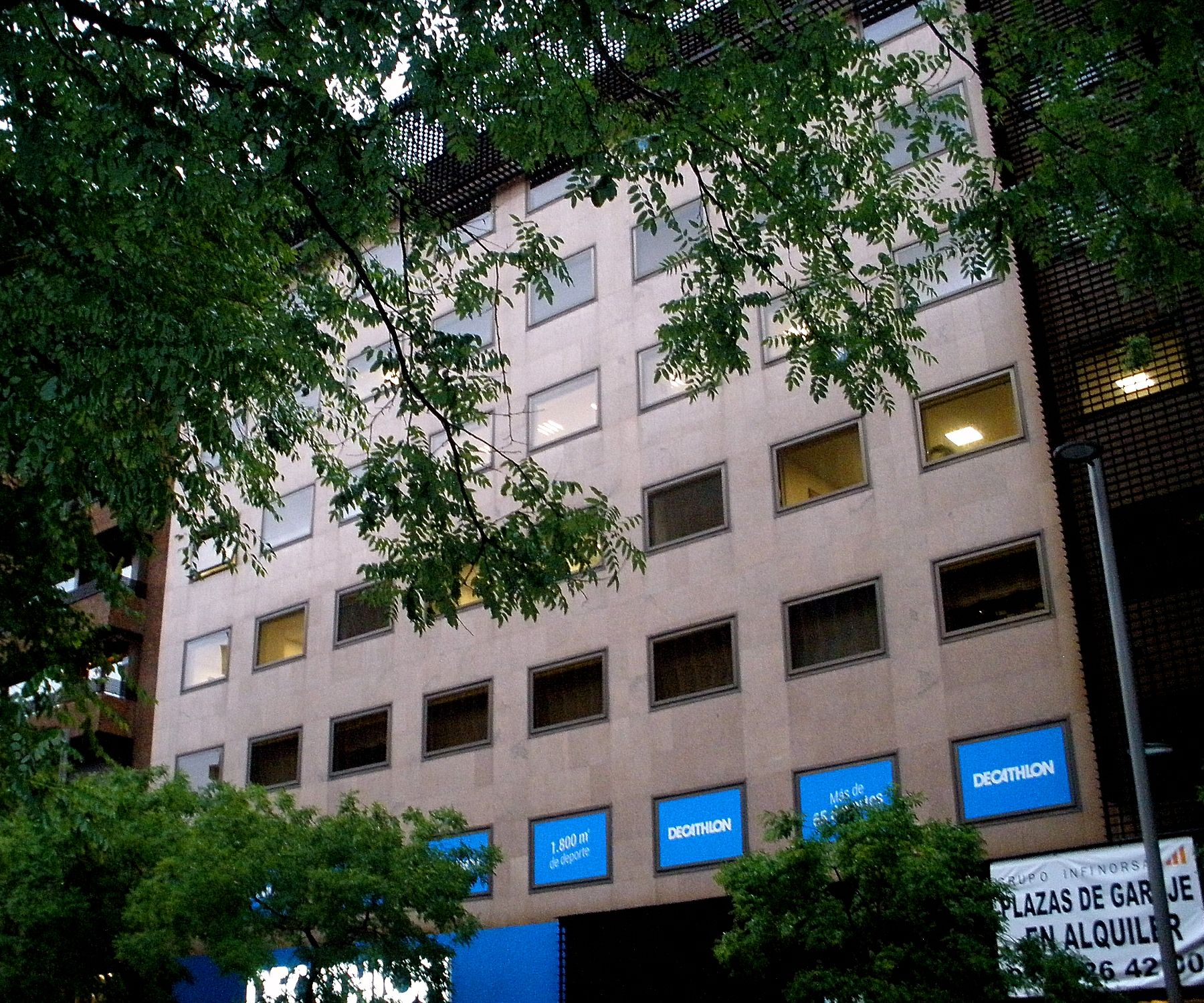
- FGD Office in Madrid
- Native name: Fondo de Garantía de Depósitos de Entidades de Crédito
- Company type: State-owned
- Industry: Finance industry
- Founded: 1977; 48 years ago
- Headquarters: Madrid, Spain
- Key people: Soledad Nunez Ramos (President)
- Services: Deposit insurance
- Owner: Government of Spain
- Website: www.fgd.es

The Deposit Guarantee Fund of Credit Institutions (Spanish: Fondo de Garantía de Depósitos de Entidades de Crédito, FGD) is a Spanish deposit guarantee fund financed by retail, cooperative, and savings banks (Spanish: cajas de ahorros) as well as the Spanish central bank covering deposits in Spanish banks.

== History ==
First set up in 1977, it originally guaranteed deposits up to the equivalent of 15,000 euros per account and account holder. Since 2010, it also plays a crucial role in the management of the FROB.

== Characteristics ==
The FGD is a private legal entity which guarantees the deposits in Spanish banks based in Spain and the European Union. The Fund guarantees up to 100,000 euros (since 10 October 2008). It is financed by an annual 2.5% levy on bank assets. The levies are deposited in three separate funds depending on whether the bank is a retail, cooperative or a savings bank. The Bank of Spain together with the Ministry of Finance may reduce the levy if the total assets of the funds reach 1% of the deposits of the respective banks.

=== Resources ===
==== Retail Bank deposit Guarantee Fund (FGDEB) ====
At close 2009 the total assets stood at 2.962 billion euros.

==== Savings Bank Deposit Guarantee Fund (FGDCA) ====
At close 2009 the total assets stood at 4.367 billion euros. Savings banks pay 0.1% per year (approx. 500 million euros). In 2009 the fund contributed 1.3 billion euros due to the bankruptcy of CCM, 1.27 billion euros to the FROB and set aside 2.252 billion euros to guarantee depositors funds in CajaSur.

==== Cooperative Banks Deposit Guarantee Fund (FGDCC) ====
At close 2009 the total assets stood at 0.675 billion euros.

== Other Schemes ==
Another similar scheme called FOGAIN exists to cover losses in investment instruments not considered as deposits.
