= Mmekutmfon Essien =

Nigerian-American photographer (1967–2001)

- Born: 1967; Ikot Ekpene
- Died: February 14, 2001 (aged 33–34); New York City
- Alma mater: Morgan State University
- Occupation: Photographer

Mmekutmfon "Mfon" Essien (1967 – February 14, 2001) was a Nigerian-American photographer.

Mmekutmfon Essien was born in 1967 in Ikot Ekpene, Nigeria, the daughter of Adiaha Essien. Her family emigrated to the United States when she was two years old and she was raised in Baltimore, Maryland. She graduated with a BA from Morgan State University.

In the early 1990s, Essien moved to New York City to work as a fashion photographer for outlets including Vibe and People. She had her art gallery debut at Rush Arts in Chelsea in 1996.

Essien was diagnosed with terminal breast cancer in 1998 and had a radical mastectomy. In response, she created a series of nude self-portraits called The Amazon's New Clothes. This work was featured at the 2000 Dakar Biennale and two of the photos were part of the exhibit Committed to the Image: Contemporary Black Photographers, which opened the day after her death at the Brooklyn Museum of Art.

Essien died on 14 February 2001 in New York City.

== Legacy ==
In 2018, Laylah Amatullah Barrayn and Adama Delphine Fawundu launched the biannual journal Mfon: Women Photographers of the African Diaspora, which was named in honor of Essien.
