= Yury Isaev =

Russian politician (born 1972)

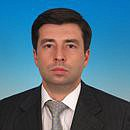
- Yury Olegovich Isaev

Personal details
- Born: 1 January 1972 (age 54) Moscow, Russian SFSR, Soviet Union
- Education: Moscow Aviation Institute
- Profession: Attorney, statesman, financier

Yury Olegovich Isaev (Russian: Ю́рий Оле́гович Иса́ев) is a Russian statesman and financier. He was deputy chairman of the Central Bank of Russia from January 26 to August 1, 2022, and president of the International Association of Deposit Insurers from 2020 to 2022.

== Life ==
Isaev was born in Moscow on January 1, 1972. In 1994, he graduated from the Faculty of Economics of the Moscow State Aviation Institute (MAI). Isaev holds a PhD in economics. He speaks French and English.

== Career ==
Isaev occupied high-profile posts in the Russian business and financial institutions as well as government organisations in 2000-2020-s.

In 1992 – 1995, Isaev worked in various positions in the Russian Credit Bank.

In 1995 – 1999, he was head of the Regional Development Department of the Russian Credit Bank.

From July 1999 to December 2000, Isaev served as the first deputy chairman and from 2000 to 2001 as chairman of the board of directors of the Russian Credit Bank.

From May 2001 to July 2002, he was chairman of the board of directors at Impexbank.

From July 2002 to April 2004, he was appointed deputy minister of economic development and trade.

From August 2003 to June 2004, Isaev served as chairman of the board of directors of Sheremetyevo International Airport.

From June to December 2004, he held a position of advisor to the first deputy director of the Federal Security Service of the Russian Federation (FSB).

From December 2004 to December 2005, he was director for government relations for the United Company RUSAL.

From December 2005 to June 2006, Isaev worked as chairman of the board for Russian Development Bank.

In 2006-2007, he has been first deputy chairman of the Dynamo Sports Club.

From 2009 to 2012, he was president of Dynamo Moscow Football Club.

In December 2011, Isaev was elected to the Sixth State Duma from the Voronezh Region. He was nominated by United Russia and served as a member of the United Russia faction. Isaev was deputy chairman of the State Duma Committee on the Financial Market. In January 2013, he resigned from the Duma before his term expired to work at the Deposit Insurance Agency of Russia.

From December 2012 to January 26, 2022, Isaev was executive director of the Deposit Insurance Agency of Russia.

From December 2020 to January 2022, he headed the International Association of Deposit Insurers.

From January 26, 2022 to August 1, 2022, Isaev served as deputy chairman of the Central Bank of the Russian Federation headed by Elvira Nabiullina.

== Personal life ==
Isaev is married and has five children.

== Awards ==
- Order of Alexander Nevsky (July 21, 2020) for accomplishments in the field of economics and finance and many years of diligent service.
- Order of Friendship (May 14, 2016) for work achievements and many years of diligent service.
- Commendation from the President of the Russian Federation (November 15, 2013) for successful job performance, many years of diligent work, and active public service.
