= Deposit Insurance Corporation of Japan =

- Native name: 預金保険機構
- Romanized name: Yokinhokenkikō
- Industry: Deposit insurance
- Founded: 1971; 55 years ago in Tokyo, Japan
- Headquarters: Tokyo, Japan
- Website: dic.go.jp

The Deposit Insurance Corporation of Japan (預金保険機構, Yokinhokenkikō) is the national deposit insurance authority of Japan. It was established in 1971 and is headquartered in Tokyo. Masanori Tanabe has been chair of the organization since 2010. Due to the 1990s' Japanese banking rescue, the company has preferred shares of 29 banks through The Restoration and Collection Company, its subsidiary. New Scientist named it as one of the 147 "superconnected" organizations "with disproportionate power over the global economy."
