= Kim Seong-Sik =

South Korean politician

President of the Korea Deposit Insurance Corporation
- Incumbent
- Assumed office January 7, 2026

Personal details
- Born: May 10, 1965 (age 61) Seoul, South Korea
- Education: Seoul National University; Harvard Law School

Kim Seong-Sik (born May 10, 1965) is a South Korean politician. Kim is the President of the Korea Deposit Insurance Corporation.

== Biography ==
Kim was born on May 10, 1965, in Seoul, South Korea. Kim graduated from Sorabol High School. He earned a degree from Seoul National University, and a Master of Laws degree from Harvard Law School. Kim passed the bar examination, and graduated from the Judicial Research and Training Institute.

From 1990 to 1993, Kim was a legal officer for the South Korean Navy. In 1993, Kim became a judge in the Incheon District Court. From 1995 to 1997, Kim was a judge in the Northern Branch of the Seoul District Court. From 1997 to 1999, Kim was a judge in the Gongju Branch of the Daejon District Court.

From 1999 to 2025, Kim was a lawyer. From 2000 to 2002, Kim was a member of the Korea Fair Trade Association´s Subcontract Dispute Mediation Committee. From 2006 to 2010, Kim a member of the Statutory Interpretation Review Committee of the Ministry of Government Legislation. When Lee Jae Myung was prosecuted for abuse of power during Lee´s gubanatorialship of Gyeonggi-do, Kim supported Lee.

From 2019 to 2025, Kim was a member of the Administration Appeals Commission of Seoul. Kim became a member of the Local Appeals Review Committee of Seoul in 2025. On January 7, 2026, Kim became the President of the Korea Deposit Insurance Corporation. Chairman of the Financial Service Commission Lee Eog-won had recommended Kim for the position. On June 1, 2026, Kim gave a address for the 30th anniversary of the Korea Deposit Insurance Corporation. In an audit by the Political Affairs Committee of the National Assembly on October 19, 2026, Kim answered the questions of Chairman Yoo Dong-soo regarding the possibility of the extension of the Korea Deposit Insurance Corporation´s special account not happening.

== Personal life ==
Kim is married and has two daughters and one son.
