= China Deposit Insurance Corporation =

Deposit guarantee scheme in China

- Deposit Insurance Fund Management Corporation
- 中国存款保险基金管理公司
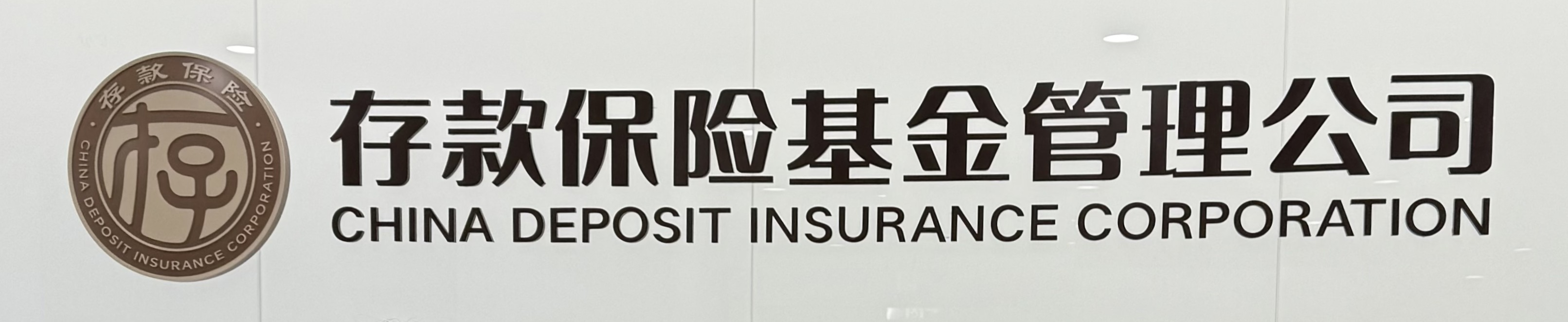
- Corporate identity displayed at the CDIC office on Beijing Financial Street
- Abbreviation: CDIC
- Formation: 2019; 7 years ago
- Purpose: Deposit guarantee scheme for the Chinese banking system
- Location: Beijing, China
- Region served: China
- Parent organization: People's Bank of China (PBC)

The China Deposit Insurance Corporation (Chinese: 中国存款保险基金管理公司), occasionally referred to as Deposit Insurance Fund Management Corporation, is the deposit guarantee scheme of the Chinese banking system established in 2019 under the People's Bank of China (PBC).

== History ==
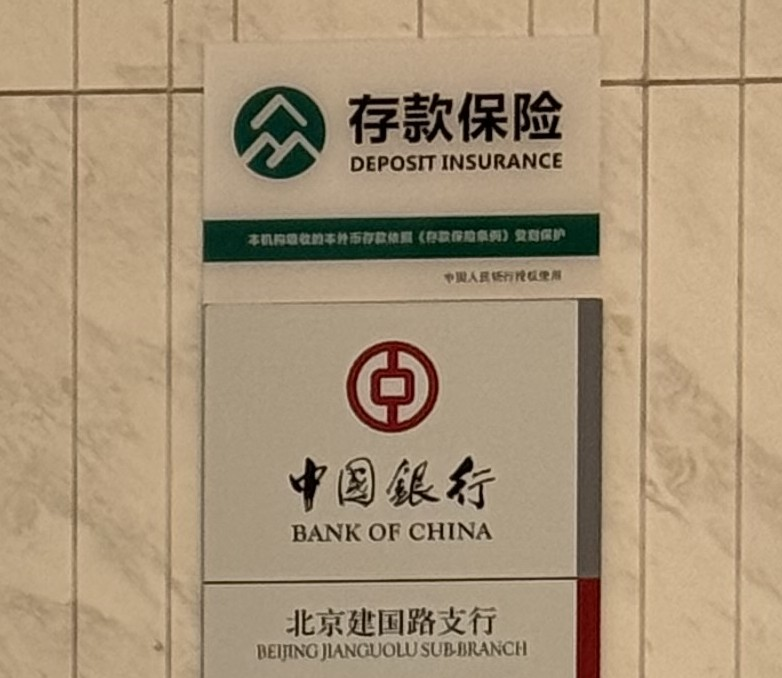
Deposit insurance logo at a branch of Bank of China in Beijing

The CDIC was established in 2019 as a fully-owned subsidiary of the PBC. It followed the enactment of China's Deposit Insurance Regulation in 2015, which established a deposit insurance limit at 500,000 renminbi per insured account.

In November 2020, the PBC mandated the use of a Deposit Insurance logo in all bank branches throughout the country. That logo is kept separate from the corporate identity of the CDIC, illustrating the lead role retained by the PBC over its CDIC subsidiary in defining deposit insurance arrangements in China.

In 2025, the International Monetary Fund and World Bank recommended that the CDIC increase the banking industry's contributions to its deposit insurance fund. They also called for clarification of the respective roles of the CDIC, PBC, National Financial Regulatory Administration and Central Financial Commission for bank resolution in China.

== See also ==
- International Association of Deposit Insurers
