= Depositors Insurance Fund =

Deposit insurance scheme in Massachusetts, USA

The Depositors Insurance Fund is a deposit insurance scheme that protects depositors at member savings banks in Massachusetts. It was created in 1934 by the state government of Massachusetts in response to the large number of Massachusetts bank failures during the Great Depression of the 1930s. This fund was the inspiration for the formation of the Federal Deposit Insurance Corporation (FDIC). After the FDIC was created, the state fund was modified to cover all amounts not covered by the FDIC. Typically the FDIC covers the first $250,000; the Massachusetts fund will cover any amount above that. As a result, account holders in Massachusetts savings banks (and Massachusetts co-operative banks, whose excess deposits are similarly insured by the Share Insurance Fund of The Co-operative Central Bank) generally have all of their deposits insured by the combination of the state fund and the FDIC.
