= Fonds de Garantie des Dépôts et de Résolution =

French deposit insurance fund

The Fonds de Garantie des Dépôts et de Résolution (FGDR, English: Deposit Guarantee and Resolution Fund) is a French deposit insurance fund. It was established on 25 June 1999 under the name of Fonds de Garantie des Dépôts (FGD), in the context of the failure of Crédit Martiniquais. In accordance with applicable EU legislation, it guarantees deposits up to €100,000.

== History of interventions ==
Since its creation in 1999, the FGDR has intervened four times:

- 1999: Crédit Martiniquais
- 1999: Mutua Equipement
- 2010: EGP
- 2013: Dubus SA

== See also ==
- Deposit Guarantee Scheme Directive
