= US SEC registration by the Commonwealth of Australia =

Form 18 registration "Commonwealth of Australia"

The Commonwealth of Australia has registered with the US Securities and Exchange Commission (SEC) to allow the Australian Government to issue securities in the US market. Registration requires entities that wish to issue securities to provide certain information to allow investors to make informed decisions and avoid fraud.

This registration has been subject to various conspiracy theories. Most relate to the idea that Australia ceased being a sovereign nation following the formation of a "Corporate" entity, or that a new entity was created that violates the Australian constitution. These conspiracies are baseless, as SEC registration does not create a new corporate entity. In this case, the Commonwealth was registered using form 18, which does not create a corporation. This is also the case for US companies, which are created by registration with state regulatory bodies and must exist before registering with the SEC. The registration does not affect the operation of Australian laws, with US regulations and laws only applying to operations done in the US. i.e only securities issued in the US would be subject to US regulations.

Although digitally available filings date back to 2002, attention was brought to it following the 2008 financial crisis and the subsequent introduction of the deposit guarantee scheme under the Rudd government. If an institution covered by the scheme were to collapse, the Australian Government would, at its discretion, issue debt securities that would be subject to US laws and financial regulations. As of 2020, Australia has yet to issue any securities related to the deposit guarantee scheme into the US market.
