= Ibibio language =

Native language of the Ibibio People

Ibibio
- Ùsèm Ìbìbìò
- Native to: Nigeria
- Region: Abia State, Akwa Ibom State, Rivers State, Cross River State
- Ethnicity: Ibibio
- Speakers: L1: 6.3 million (2020); L2: 4.5 million (2013)
- Language family: Niger–Congo?: Atlantic–Congo; Volta–Congo; Benue–Congo; Cross River; Lower Cross; Ibibio-Efik; Ibibio
- Writing system: Latin

Language codes
- ISO 639-3: ibb
- Glottolog: ibib1240

- Person: Ówó Ìbìbìò
- People: Mbon Ìbìbìò
- Language: Ùsèm Ìbìbìò
- Country: Ibibioland

An Ibibio speaker, recorded in the United Kingdom.

Ibibio (Standardized Ibibio: Ùsèm Ìbìbìò) is the native language of the Ibibio people of Nigeria, belonging to the Ibibio-Efik dialect cluster of the Cross River languages also known as Ibibioid in the Niger-Congo language family. The name Ibibio is sometimes used for the entire dialect cluster. In pre-colonial times, the Ibibio used Nsibidi ideograms, as did the Igbo, Efik, Anaang, and Ejagham. Ibibio has influenced Afro-American diasporic languages. For example, the AAVE word buckra and Afro-Cuban abakua come from the Ibibio word mbakara.

== Geographic distribution ==
The Ibibio people are found in the South-South region of Nigeria in Akwa Ibom State, Cross River State, and Eastern Abia State (Arochukwu and Ukwa East LGAs). Ibibio communities in Opobo Nkoro and Oyigbo LGA's of Rivers State are largely unknown.

Some Ibibios are also found in other neighboring countries (western Cameroon, Bioko — central Guinea, and Ghana).

== Phonology ==
=== Consonants ===
Ibibio consonant phonemes
		Labial	Coronal	Palatal	Velar	Labial-velar
Nasal		m	n	ɲ	ŋ	
Plosive	voiceless	b	t		k	k͡p
Plosive	voiced	b	d			
Fricative	voiceless	f	s			
Approximant				j		w

- /m, b/ are bilabial, whereas /f/ is labiodental.
  - /b/ has two allophones, which occur in complementary distribution: voiceless [p] and voiced [b].
- /n, d, s/ are alveolar [n, d, s], whereas /t/ is dental [t̪].
- Stem-initial /ŋ/ is realized as [ŋ͡w].

Intervocalic plosives are lenited:

- /b/ → [β]
- /t, d/ → [ɾ]
- /k/ → [ɢ̆] or [ɰ]

=== Vowels ===
Ranges for Ibibio monophthongs, from Urua (2004:106)

Ibibio vowel phonemes
	Front	Back	
	unrounded	unrounded	rounded
Close	i		u
Mid	e	ʌ	o
Open	a		ɔ

- /i, u/ are phonetically near-close [ɪ, ʊ].
- /e, ʌ, o/ are phonetically true-mid; /ʌ/ is also strongly centralized: [e̞, ʌ̝̈, o̞].
- /a, ɔ/ are phonetically near-open; /a/ is central rather than front: [ɐ, ɔ̞].

Between consonants, /i, u, o/ have allophones that are transcribed [ɪ, ʉ, ə], respectively. At least in case of [ɪ, ə], the realization is probably somewhat different (e.g. close-mid [e, ɘ]), because the default IPA values of the symbols [ɪ, ə] are very similar to the normal realizations of the Ibibio vowels /i, ʌ/. Similarly, [ʉ] may actually be near-close [ʉ̞], rather than close [ʉ].

In some dialects (e.g. Ibiono), /ɪ, ʉ, ə/ occur as phonemes distinct from /i, u, o/.

=== Tones ===
Ibibio has five phonemic tones: high, mid, rising, falling and low.

== Orthography ==
Ibibio alphabet
Letter	IPA
a	a
b	b
d	d
e	e
ǝ	ə
f	f
gh	ɣ
h	x
i	i
ị	ɨ
k	k
kp	kp
m	m
n	n
n̄	ŋ
n̄w	ŋʷ
ny	ɲ
o	o
ọ	ɔ
ʌ	ʌ
p	p
s	s
t	t
u	u
ụ	ʉ
w	w
y	j

An earlier version of the alphabet used ⟨ñ⟩ for ⟨n̄⟩.

== Grammar ==
Ibibio a tonal language with Subject-Verb-Object (SVO) word order, rich pronoun markers, and complex verb conjugations for tense/aspect.

Ibibio Subject, Object, Possession, and Morphemes

Number	Subject	Subject Morpheme	Object	Object Morpheme	Possession
Keed (singular)	Ami [àmì] (I)	ń	Mien/Miin [míèn](me)	n	Mmi [m̀mì] (mine)
Keed (singular)	Afo [àfò] (you)	à/ú	Fien [fíèn] (you)	u	Mfo [m̀fò] (yours)
Keed (singular)	Anye [ànyé] (He/She/It)	á	Anye [ànyé] (Him/Her)	Ø	Amọ [ámọ̀] (his/hers)
Uwak (Plural)	Nnyin [ǹnyị̀n] (we)	ì	Nnyin [ǹnyị̀n] (us)	i	Nnyin (ours)
Uwak (Plural)	Ndufo/Mbufo [ǹdùfò] (you guys/y'all)	è	Ndufo/Mbufo [ǹdùfò] (you guys/y'all)	i	Ndufo [ǹdùfò] (you guys'/y'all's)
Uwak (Plural)	Ammọ [àmmọ́] (they)	é	Ammọ [àmmọ́] (them)	Ø	Ammọ [àmmọ́] (theirs)

Ibibio uses an array of equivalent coordinators for NP/DP coordination.

Ékpê yè/ǹdò/m̀mè Àkpán è-mà é-ŋ wɔ́ŋ úkɔ́tńsʌ̀ŋ.
Ekpe and Akpan 3PL-PST 3PL- drink palmwine
Ekpe and Akpan drank palmwine.

These are, however, illicit when coordinating verbs and larger verbal constructions. Instead, nyʌ́ŋ (and) is used, which surfaces to the left of the main verb in the second conjunct.

Ìmá á-kpón á-nyʌ́ŋ/*yè/*ǹdò/*m̀mè á-yáíyá.
Ima 3SG-become.big 3SG-and 3SG-be.beautiful
Ima grew up and became beautiful

Single Tense Test

Serial verb constructions (SVCs) (e.g., nyʌ́ŋ) maximally contain a single tense marker. This property is seen in Ibibio.

Ékpê á-mà á-dí (*á-mà) í-sé úfɔ̂k m̀mì
Ekpe 3SG-PST 3SG-come 3SG-PST I-see house 1SG-POSS
Ekpe came and saw my house

Òkôn á-mà á-dùwɔ́ Àkpán á-dʌ́k àdùbè.
Okon 3SG-PST 3SG-fall Akpan 3SG-enter pit
Okon fell (and) Akpan entered a pit

Single Negation Test

SVCs commonly allow for only one instance of negation (Hiraiwa & Bodomo 2008), and this holds for Ibibio, as well. In Ibibio, negation scopes over V1 and V2, but only V1 gets negated (Major 2015). Below are 3 different intended ways of saying "Eno didn't arise" using negation.

Ènɔ̀ í-ké í-dàká-ké í-dá.
Eno I-PST.FOC I-rise-NEG I-stand
Eno didn't arise

Ènɔ̀ á-mà/í-ké á-/í-dàká í-dá-há.
Eno 3SG-PST/I-PST.FOC 3SG/I-rise I-stand-NEG
Eno didn't arise

Ènɔ̀ í-ké í-dàká-ké í-dá-há.
Eno I-PST.FOC I-rise-NEG I-stand-NEG
Eno didn't arise

== Numerals ==
Ibibio cardinal and ordinal numbers from zero to ten:

No.	English	Ibibio	Ordinal
0	Zero	Ikpoikpo	N/A
1	One	Kèèd	Àkpá (1st)
2	Two	Íbà	Udiana (2nd)
3	Three	Ítá	Ọyọhọ Ítá (3rd)
4	Four	Ínàañ	Ọyọhọ Ínàañ (4th)
5	Five	Ítíòn	Ọyọhọ Ítíòn (5th)
6	Six	Ítíòkèèd	Ọyọhọ Ítíòkèèd (6th)
7	Seven	Ítíábà	Ọyọhọ Ítíábà (7th)
8	Eight	Ítíáìtà	Ọyọhọ Ítíáìtà (8th)
9	Nine	Úsúk-kèèd	Ọyọhọ Úsúk-kèèd (9th)
10	Ten	Dúòp	Ọyọhọ Dúòp (10th)
11	Eleven	Dúòp ye/mme Kèèd	Ọyọhọ Dúòp ye/mme Kèèd (11th)
12	Twelve	Dúòp ye/mme Íbà	Ọyọhọ Dúòp ye/mme Íbà (12th)
13	Thirteen	Dúòp ye/mme Ítá	Ọyọhọ Dúòp ye/mme Ítá (13th)
14	Fourteen	Dúòp ye/mme Ínàañ	Ọyọhọ Dúòp ye/mme Ínàañ (14th)
15	Fifteen	Èfịd	Ọyọhọ Èfịd (15th)

Base System

The Ibibio language uses a unique base-20 system for number up to 100

No.	English	Ibibio	Ordinal
20	Twenty	Edíp	Ọyọhọ Edíp (20th)
30	Thirty	Edíp ye/mme Dúòp	Ọyọhọ Edíp ye/mme Dúòp (30th)
40	Forty	Ábà	Ọyọhọ Edíp ye/mme Dúòp (40th)
50	Fifty	Ábà ye/mme Dúòp	Ọyọhọ Ábà ye/mme Dúòp (50th)
60	Sixty	Atà	Ọyọhọ Atà (60yj)
70	Seventy	Atà ye/mme Dúòp	Ọyọhọ Atà ye/mme Dúòp (70th)
80	Eighty	Anàñ	Ọyọhọ Anàñ (80th)
90	Ninety	Anàñ ye/mme Dúòp	Ọyọhọ Anàñ ye/mme Dúòp (90th)
100	One Hundred	Íkíè	Ọyọhọ Íkíè (100th)
1000	One Thousand	Tosin Kèèd	Ọyọhọ Tosin [Kèèd] (1000th)
2000	Two Thousand	Tosin Íbà	Ọyọhọ Tosin Íbà (2000th)

If the number isn't divisible by 20 or can have 15 added to the base number (ex. 35 - Edíp mme Èfịd [20 + 15]), then the number will be built off the base-20 system (ex. 34 - Edíp mme Dúòp ye/mme Ínàañ [20 + 10 + 4]).

== Ibibio names ==
Ibibio names are traditionally significant, often carrying deep meanings and cultural relevance. These names are typically given for various reasons, including the circumstances of birth, family history, and the spiritual or moral qualities parents hope to impart to their children. Below are some notable Ibibio names and their meanings.

Family Positions:

- Akpan: "First son"
- Udo: "Second son"
- Etukudo: "Third son"
- Udọsen: "Fourth son"
- Adiaha/Adiaba: "First daughter"
- Ññwa: "Second daughter"
- Ete: "Father"
- Eka: "Mother"
- Eka- Ete- /eka: eka-ete (mother of father/paternal grandmother) ete-ete (father of father/paternal grandfather)
- Ekam: Grandmother (general)
- Etebom: Grandfather (general)
- Eyen/Ayin- eka Owoden: Brother
- Eyen/Ayin -eka Owowan: Sister
- Ebe: Husand
- Anwan: Wife
- Eyin Eyen Eka - Niece/Nephew
- Eyin ette/eka - Step brother/sister
- Eyeyin - Grand child

More familiar names can be built on common root words. (e.g. eyin-eka/ayin-eka ekam [child of mother (sibling) of grandmother (general) = grand-uncle/aunty]).

Common names:

- Idoreyin: "Hope"
- Ukeme: "Ability"
- Ayanime: "Long-lasting patience"
- Itohowo: "Not of human"
- Imoh: "Rich, wealthy"
- Abasiakan: "God forbid"
- Abasi-akara: "God is in control"
- Mmedăra: "I rejoice"
- Utomobong: "the handiwork of God"/ "God's work"
- Ekom: "Thanksgiving"
- Bāk Abàsi: "Fear God"
- Idaraobong: "God's Joy"
- Idọñesid/Idongesit: "Comfort"
- Itooro/Itoro: "Praise"
- Mfon - Grace
- Mfoniso - Favour
- Mbọdidem/Mboutidem: "Faith"
- Uduak-Abasi: "God's Will"
- Edikan - Victory
- Nsikak-Abasi: What is hard for God?
- Toiyo-Abasi - "Remember God"
- Inemesit - "Happiness"

== Proverbs ==
The following Ibibio proverbs with English translations come from The Sayings of the Wise: Ibibio Proverbs and Idioms by Anietie Akpabio, published in 1899.

- "Ekpo ufɔk ɔkɔbɔ owo." "Trouble often begins at home."
- "Eto keet isikabake akai." "One tree does not make a forest."
- "Ikpat eka unen isiwotdo nditɔ." "A hen's feet cannot kill the chickens (i.e. the mother's actions are never meant to be harmful to the children)."
- "Ekpo atua ekpo". "One who mocks another may hide their own troubles."
- "Idop, idop ewa, enye ata ɔkpɔ unam." "It is a quiet dog that eats the fattest bone."
- "Ofum ese ekpep eto unek." "The wind teaches the tree how to dance (i.e. someone's action that generates good will in another person)."

== Bibliography ==
- Urua, Eno-Abasi E. (2004), "Ibibio", Journal of the International Phonetic Association, 34 (1): 105–109, doi:10.1017/S0025100304001550
