= Norwegian Banks' Guarantee Fund =

The Norwegian Banks' Guarantee Fund (Norwegian: Bankenes sikringsfond) administers the country's deposit guarantee scheme, which guarantees deposits in Norwegian banks. The Norwegian Banks' Guarantee Fund is regulated by the Act on the Norwegian Banks’ Guarantee Fund of 23 March 2018 and the Financial Institutions Act of 10 April 2015, Chapter 19 and Chapter 20. The fund was established on 1 July 2004 following a merger of the Commercial Banks' Guarantee Fund and the Savings Banks' Guarantee Fund. The Savings Banks' Guarantee Fund has a history dating back to 1921, when the guarantee scheme was a voluntary scheme.

All banks holding a Norwegian banking license are compulsory members of the Norwegian Banks' Guarantee Fund, while membership is optional for branches of foreign banks. The deposit guarantee covers deposits up to 2 million Norwegian kroner per depositor per member bank. If a client has deposits in several banks, the limit of 2 million Norwegian kroner applies to each of the banks. Whether the depositor is a private person, or a legal person is nonessential. The guarantee amount is paid to the customer within seven working days after the Ministry of Finance has decided that the bank shall be liquidated.

The deposit guarantee has some exceptions, including deposits from other credit institutions and from public authorities. Deposits deriving from dividends in transactions which, according to a final judgment, are in breach of the legislation on money laundering or financing of terrorist activities are also not covered by the deposit guarantee.

All banks domiciled in the EEA area have schemes that secure the deposits. From 1 January 2011, the deposit coverage level in the EU was harmonized to 100,000 euros.
