= Béké =

Antillean Creole term for descendant of European settlers

A Béké are the white Creoles descended from the first European, usually French, settlers and planters mainly in Martinique, but also in Guadeloupe. The Békés are less than one percent of the population on both islands, numbering 3,000 on Martinique and 2,000 on Guadeloupe, yet they control much of the local industry.

== Etymology ==
The term is possibly derived from Martinican Creole, originally from an African language. Berbice Dutch had a similar word (bɛkɛ) which also referred to a white person. The origin of the term is unclear, although it is attested in colonial documents from as early as the first decade of the eighteenth century. Possible origins for the word include Kalabari ̣bekín ̣bọ ("white person" ) and Ashanti m’béké ("man in power").

It may also derive from Igbo phrases that describe Europeans. One Caribbean tradition holds that it originated from the question « eh bé qué ? » (« eh bien quoi ? », similar to "well what?"), an expression picked up from the French settlers. Another explanation is that its origin lies in the term « blanc des quais » ("a white person from the quay") as the white colonists and merchants controlled the ports.

William Balfour Baikie explored most of south east Nigeria and parts of Cross River and Benue States. The Igede people in these states also refer to a white person as ubekee.

In Guadeloupe one theory is that it originated as an abbreviation (BK) of Blan Kréyol (Blanc Créole).

== Identity ==
The term Béké doesn't refer to all white people in the Antilles. In Guadeloupe the term Blan Péyi (Blancs-Pays in French) is more commonly used, but is much broader because it includes both the Békés and the white people born in the Antilles that have adapted to the Creole life but are not descendants of the first settlers. Blancs-créole is another similar term. Béke goyave refers to a non-rich Béké and originated from a time when guava was considered a less lucrative crop to bananas. Métro (from métropolitain), Blancs-France and Béké-France (in Martinique) are neutral terms used to describe white people from mainland France. Zoreille (also z'oreille and zorey) is a more mocking term for the mainland French that either live on or visit the island.

A separate group of whites known as Blancs-Matignons live in the Grands Fonds of Guadeloupe and are descended from a mix of impoverished settlers, indentured laborers, and refugee aristocrats that fled during the Revolution. They number around 400 people and are a shrinking community that has become increasingly mixed-race.

The Îles des Saintes has a population that is primarily European, but they are distinct from Békés as they descend from poorer settlers (petit-blancs) and have a seafaring culture that developed in isolation.

== History ==
The first White settlers arrived to the Antilles in 1635 with Pierre Belain d'Esnambuc. Though Békés are known for being descended from nobility, the early settlers were a diverse group with nobility making up a small minority. Of the nobility that did come, they were the youngest sons from noble and bourgeois families who under the laws of the Ancien régime could not benefit from their father's wealth. This lesser nobility mainly started arriving between 1655 and 1665 and were granted 100 to 300 hectares of land.

The next group were the engagés, indentured servants who signed contracts to be transported and work on the islands. Most of them were rural workers and artisans. Another group were ex-convicts, who had nothing to lose by moving to the Antilles, as well as judicial exiles, people who were forcibly shipped out usually either because they had debts they couldn't pay off or they were beggars who were convicted of vagrancy. French women didn't start arriving in large numbers until 1680. These women were called envoyées du Roi and they were orphans mainly recruited from Paris. Larger groups of French aristocracy began to immigrate between 1751 and 1764 to invest in the plantations and set up sugar refineries. Though a majority of early settlers were French, other Europeans arrived as well, noticeably Madeirans and Dutch.

In 1794, when the French Revolution had abolished slavery and aristocracy, planters from Martinique and Guadeloupe signed the Whitehall Accord with the British to maintain slavery on the islands in exchange for accepting British occupation. Guadeloupe was invaded that year, but the British were defeated by the French led by Victor Hugues, who had the royalists and planters executed. 867 of them were shot and another 27 were guillotined.

The British were more successful on Martinique, which was under British occupation until 1802. Because of this, slavery survived on the island and the white population remained, with some refugees from Guadeloupe settling on Martinique. Today the Béke families on Guadeloupe are related to those on Martinique due to migration, especially after the 1902 eruption of Mount Pelée.

== See also ==
- Buckra
- Redleg
- Zoreilles
