= Deposit insurance =

Measure protecting bank depositors from losses caused by a bank default

Deposit insurance, deposit protection or deposit guarantee is a measure implemented in many countries to protect bank depositors, in full or in part, from losses caused by a bank's inability to pay its debts when due. Deposit insurance or deposit guarantee systems are one component of a financial system safety net that promotes financial stability, and are typically integrated with bank regulation and supervision.

== History in the United States ==
The first deposit insurance system in the United States, which also protected holders of banknotes, was established by New York State in 1829 under the leadership of governor Martin Van Buren. Its promoter was Joshua Forman, a businessman from Syracuse, who took inspiration for it from arrangements established among the Hong merchant community of Guangzhou. Deposit and banknote insurance schemes were subsequently created in Vermont in 1831, Indiana in 1834, Michigan in 1836, Ohio in 1845, and Iowa in 1858. The Michigan scheme only lasted until 1842, but the five others operated successfully until the National Bank Act made them obsolete in the 1860s.

A second wave of state-level deposit insurance schemes were established in Oklahoma in 1908, Kansas, Nebraska and Texas in 1909, Mississippi in 1914, South Dakota in 1915, and North Dakota and Washington in 1917. All of these, however, had become insolvent by early 1930 at the start of the Great Depression.

The establishment of the Federal Deposit Insurance Corporation by the 1933 Banking Act brought a lasting solution to the challenge of deposit insurance in the United States. It was subsequently emulated by many other jurisdictions, as illustrated by the names of the Philippine Deposit Insurance Corporation (est. 1963), Canada Deposit Insurance Corporation (est. 1967), Deposit Insurance Corporation of Japan (est. 1971), Nigeria Deposit Insurance Corporation (est. 1988), Korea Deposit Insurance Corporation (est. 1996), Kenya Deposit Insurance Corporation (est. 2012), and China Deposit Insurance Corporation (est. 2019).

== Process ==
Banks are allowed (and usually encouraged) to lend or invest most of the money deposited with them instead of safe-keeping the full amounts (see fractional-reserve banking). If many of a bank's borrowers fail to repay their loans when due, the bank's creditors, including its depositors, risk loss. Because they rely on customer deposits that can be withdrawn on little or no notice, banks in financial trouble are prone to bank runs, where depositors seek to withdraw funds quickly ahead of a possible bank insolvency. Because banking institution failures have the potential to trigger a broad spectrum of harmful events, including economic recessions, policy makers maintain deposit insurance schemes to protect depositors and to give them comfort that their funds are not at risk.

Deposit insurance institutions are for the most part government run or established, and may or may not be a part of a country's central bank, while some are private entities with government backing or completely private entities. There are a number of countries with more than one deposit insurance system in operation, including Austria, Canada (Ontario and Quebec), Germany, Italy, and the United States.

== By country ==
According to the International Association of Deposit Insurers (IADI), as of 31 January 2014, 113 countries have instituted some form of explicit deposit insurance, up from 12 in 1974. Another 41 countries are considering the implementation of an explicit deposit insurance system.

=== Africa ===
==== Central Africa ====
Banks in the Economic Community of Central African States are eligible for an international system called the Deposit Guarantee Fund in Central Africa (FOGADAC). Although the system is well capitalized, details of its failure response process remain to be determined.

==== South Africa ====
The Corporation for Deposit Insurance (CODI), a subsidiary of the South African Reserve Bank, was launched in April 2024. It insures up to R100,000 per depositor in the event of a bank failure.

==== Nigeria ====
The Nigeria Deposit Insurance Corporation (NDIC) is an independent Nigerian government agency established in 1989 to insure bank deposits, supervise financial institutions, and help resolve failing banks in order to maintain stability in Nigeria’s financial system. It protects depositors by guaranteeing insured funds up to a specified limit and ensures prompt payment when banks fail. Under its deposit insurance scheme, the NDIC guarantees payment of deposits up to ₦5,000,000 for Deposit Money Banks and Mobile Money Operators, and ₦2,000,000 for Microfinance Banks, Primary Mortgage Banks, and Payment Service Banks, in the event of a bank failure..

=== Americas ===
==== Brazil ====
In Brazil, the creation of deposit insurance was authorized by Resolution 2197 of 1995, the National Monetary Council. This standard mandated the creation of a protection mechanism for credit holders against financial institutions, called "Credit Guarantee Fund" (FGC). Currently, the FGC is regulated by Resolution 4222 of 2013. The Fiscal Responsibility Act prohibits the use of public funds to finance the losses, so it is formed exclusively by compulsory contributions from the participating institutions. The warranty is limited to R$250,000 per depositor. The Guarantor Credit Union Fund (FGCoop) was created in order to protect depositors of credit unions and cooperative banks. As the FGC, the FGCoop guarantees up to R$250,000 and consists of compulsory contributions of cooperatives and cooperative banks.

==== Canada ====
Canada created the Canada Deposit Insurance Corporation (CDIC) in 1967. It is similar to the Federal Deposit Insurance Corporation in the United States. Since 1967, 43 financial institutions have failed in Canada and all were members of CDIC. There have been no failures since 1996. Information on the Canadian system can be found at www.cdic.ca. Insurance is restricted to registered member institutions, and covers only the first C$100,000 in very specific categories of accounts. Credit unions and Quebec's caisse populaire system are not insured federally because they are created under provincial charters and backed by provincial insurance plans, which generally follow the federal model. Funds in a foreign currency and guaranteed investment certificates with a term of longer than five years held in a CDIC-registered financial institution are insured as of 30 April 2020. Funds in foreign banks operating in Canada may or may not be covered depending on whether they are members of CDIC. Some funds in the Registered Retirement Savings Plan or registered retirement income fund at their bank may not be covered if they are invested in mutual funds or held in specific instruments like debentures issued by government or corporations. The general principle is to cover reasonable deposits and savings, but not deposits deliberately positioned to take risks for gain, such as mutual funds or stocks.

The roots of this reform can be traced back to the 19th century, such as Upper Canada's financial problems of 1866, the North American panic of 1872, and the 1923 failure of Toronto's Home Bank, symbolized today by Casa Loma. Historically, in Canada, regional risk has always been spread nationally within each large bank, unlike the uneven geography of US unit banking, layered with savings & loans of regional or national size, which in turn disperse their risk through investors. Generally speaking, the Canadian banking system is well regulated, in part by the Office of the Superintendent of Financial Institutions (Canada), which can in an extreme case close a financial institution. That and Canada's tight mortgage rules mean bank failures similar to the US are much less likely.

==== Mexico ====
In Mexico, the Instituto para la Protección al Ahorro Bancario (IPAB) is the deposit insurance set up by the country for account holders in Mexico. It insures up to 400,000 UDIs (Unidad de Inversión), the equivalent of $2,743,209.20 pesos for each account (as of July 2021). In 1981, the General Law of Credit Institutions and Auxiliary Organizations provided for the creation of a fund to protect credit obligations assumed by banks.

==== United States ====
The Federal Deposit Insurance Corporation (FDIC) is the deposit insurer for the United States. Prior to the Civil War and in the 1920s, there were various sub-national deposit insurance schemes. The United States was the second country (after Czechoslovakia) to institute national deposit insurance when it established the FDIC in the wake of the 1933 banking crisis that accompanied the Great Depression.

Credit-union share accounts at federally insured credit unions are covered by the National Credit Union Share Insurance Fund, which is administered by the NCUA; several state-chartered credit unions instead use private insurers whose coverage is not backed by the full faith and credit of the United States. The FDIC and NCUA each insure up to $250,000 for each owner at an institution. Separately from these, the Securities Investor Protection Corporation provides limited asset protection, but not insurance, for the cash and securities of the customers of failed investment brokerages.

In Massachusetts, the Depositors Insurance Fund (DIF) insures deposits in excess of the FDIC limits at state-chartered savings banks.

=== European Union ===
Directive 94/19/EC of the European Parliament and of the Council of 30 May 1994 on deposit-guarantee schemes required all member states to have a deposit guarantee scheme for at least 90% of the deposited amount, up to at least 20,000 euros per person. On 7 October 2008, the Ecofin meeting of EU ministers of finance agreed to increase the minimum amount to 50,000. Timelines and details on procedures for the implementation, which was likely to be a national matter for the member states, was not immediately available. The increased amount followed on Ireland's move, in September 2008, to increase its deposit insurance to an unlimited amount. Many other EU countries, starting with the United Kingdom, reacted by increasing their limits to discourage people from transferring their savings to Irish banks.

In November 2007 a comprehensive report was published by the EU, with a description and comparison of each Insurance Guarantee Scheme in place for all EU member states. The report concluded that many of the schemes had restricted the appliance of guarantees to retail consumers, usually private individuals, although small or medium (SME) businesses were also sometimes placed into the retail category. No schemes applied to large wholesale customers: the rationale was that the latter are often in a better position than retail customers to assess the financial risks of particular firms with whom they engage, or are able themselves to reduce their risk by using several financial banks/institutes. The report recommended this practice to continue, as limiting of the scheme's to "retail customers (excl./incl. SME businesses)" helps to reduce the cost of the scheme but also helps to increase its available funds for those who actually need the guarantee when it is activated for the protection of claimants.

==== By country ====
In October 2008, many countries in the EU increased the amount covered by their deposit insurance schemes. Since these amounts are typically encoded in legislation, there was a certain delay before the new amounts were formally valid. EFDI - Participants details

Country	Coverage limit	Coverage %	Valid since	Deposit insurance organization	Comments and previous amounts
Belgium	EUR 100,000 (Note: According to Art. 7 (1a) of Directive 94/19/EC all EU Member States were expected to increase the amount to EUR 100,000 as of 31 December 2010. This is the case in all EU countries. For countries with non-EURO currency the limits are near to EUR 100,000 e.g. in Denmark DKK 750,000 which is near to that limit, depending on EUR-DKK rate.)	100%		Fonds de Protection / Beschermings Fonds / Protection Fund	Previously EUR 20,000 before 2009.
Bulgaria	EUR 100,000	100%	31 December 2010	Bulgarian Deposit Insurance Fund	EUR 51,129 effective 15 April 1998; Amount raised to BGN 196,000 (EUR 100,000) effective 31 December 2010. Article 23 (7) of the Bank Deposit Guarantee Law says that the guaranteed amount for foreign currency deposits shall be paid out in Bulgarian levs (BGN) calculated using the Bulgarian National Bank's exchange rate on the first day of paying out of guaranteed deposits.
Croatia	EUR 100,000	100%	1 July 2013	Državna agencija za osiguranje uloga i sanaciju banaka - State Agency for Deposit Insurance and Bank Resolution	100% of the first HRK 30,000 and 75% between 30,000 and 50,000 effective 20 June 1997. Amount raised to HRK 100,000 effective 1 July 1998. Amount raised to 400,000 effective 15 October 2008.
Cyprus	EUR 100,000	100%	September 2000	Deposit Guarantee and Resolution of Credit and Other Institutions Scheme (DGS)	
Czech Republic	EUR 100,000	100%		Deposit Insurance Fund	90% of EUR 25,000 effective 2002; 100 % coverage and amount raised to EUR 50,000 effective 2008. Credit unions are covered since 2006.
Denmark	DKK 750,000	100%	30 September 2010	Garantifonden for indskydere og investorer - The Guarantee Fund for Depositors and Investors	For the two-year period from 5 October 2008 to 30 September 2010, an unlimited governmental guarantee for deposits was added.
Finland	EUR 100,000	100%	1 January 2011	Financial Stability Authority	100% insured up to EUR 25,000 effective 1998. Amount increased to EUR 50,000 effective 8 October 2008.
France	EUR 100,000	100%	25 June 1999	Fonds de Garantie des Dépôts et de Résolution (FGDR)	Following the Irish legislative change to unlimited state guarantee, and the German announcement of unlimited support, the French President declared on 13 October 2008 that "The government will not let any French bank fail", in a speech that was posted on the country's official website, www.gouvernement.fr. This political commitment has so far held (rescue of the Franco-Belgian bank DEXIA)
Germany	EUR 100,000	100%	1 January 2011	Private Banks: Entschädigungseinrichtung deutscher Banken GmbH (EdB); Public Banks: VÖB-Entschädigungseinrichtung GmbH; Brokerage companies: Entschädigungseinrichtung der Wertpapierhandelsunternehmen (EdW)	The four banking associations run voluntary additional guarantee schemes, which go beyond the European minimum of EUR 100,000. For instance for BdB member banks, "The protection ceiling for each creditor is 30% of the liable capital of the Bank..." An unlimited state guarantee was announced in October 2008 (and extended in July 2009). The legal details are nevertheless unclear. "It is a political declaration" said Torsten Albig.: Bundesverband deutscher Banken BdB (for private banks); Bundesverband Öffentlicher Banken Deutschlands VÖB (for public sector banks); Bundesverband der Deutschen Volksbanken und Raiffeisenbanken BVR (for co-operative banks); Deutscher Sparkassen- und Giroverband DSGV (Savings banks)
Greece	EUR 100,000	100%	October 2008		Was 20,000 EUR, increased in October 2008
Hungary	EUR 100,000	100%		National Deposit Insurance Fund (NDIF)	
Ireland	EUR 100,000	100%		The Deposit Guarantee Scheme (DGS)	The Deposit Guarantee Scheme (DGS) protects depositors in the event of a bank, building society or credit union authorised by the Central Bank of Ireland being unable to repay deposits. Deposits up to EUR 100,000 per person per institution are protected. The DGS is obliged to issue compensation to depositors duly verified as eligible within 20 working days of a credit institution failing.
Italy	EUR 100,000	100%	24 March 2011 (effective 7 May 2011)	Fondo Interbancario di Tutela dei Depositi (FITD); Fondo di Garanzia dei Depositanti del Credito Cooperativo	Amount decreased from EUR 103,291.38 (ITL 200,000,000).
Latvia	EUR 100,000	100%	1 January 2011		
Lithuania	EUR 100,000	100%		Valstybės įmonė "Indėlių ir investicijų draudimas"	Previously (since 2002), the insured amount LTL 45,000 (EUR 13,032); in 2008 it was increased to 100% of deposits up to EUR 20,000. In 2009, the limit was increased to EUR 100,000.
Luxembourg	EUR 100,000	100%		Fonds de garantie des dépôts Luxembourg (FGDL)	Previously, the insured amount was EUR 20,000. In 2009, the limit was increased to EUR 100,000.
Malta	EUR 100,000	100%	21 November 2003	Depositor Compensation Scheme	The Maltese Depositor Compensation Scheme is managed by a Management Committee which is appointed by the Malta Financial Services Authority (the single regulator for financial services in Malta). The committee is made up of persons representing the MFSA, the Central Bank of Malta, investment firms, the banks and customers.
Netherlands	EUR 100,000	100%	7 October 2008	Depositogarantiestelsel	Before 7 October 2008 coverage was 100% of first EUR 20,000, 90% of next EUR 20,000 (hence a compensation of up to EUR 38,000).
Poland	EUR 100,000 (corresponding amount in PLN)	100%	30 December 2010	Bankowy Fundusz Gwarancyjny (BFG)	Amount raised from EUR 50,000 on 30 December 2010
Portugal	EUR 100,000	100%	November 2008	Fundo de Garantia de Depósitos	Amount raised from EUR 25,000 to EUR 100,000 in November 2008. Provisions of Decree-Law Article 166 says "According to article 12 of Decree-Law No. 211 – A/2008, of 3 November 2008, until 31 December 2011, the limit shall be increased from € 25,000 to € 100,000". Article 2 of the Decree-Law No. 119/2011 set the limit of €100,000 as permanent
Romania	EUR 100,000	100%	1996	FGDB	Established in 1996 as per the first Annual Report available in 2005.
Slovakia	EUR 100,000	100%	1 November 2008	Deposit Protection Fund	Credit unions are not covered.
Slovenia	EUR 100,000	100%	28 July 2010	Slovene: Banka Slovenije, the central bank of the Republic of Slovenia	The Bank of Slovenia joined the Eurosystem in 2007, when the euro replaced the tolar.
Spain	EUR 100,000	100%	11 October 2008	Fondo de Garantía de Depósitos	Before that it was EUR 20,000. Since 2011 there is a unified fund for banks, savings banks and cooperative banks.
Sweden	SEK 1,050,000	100%	31 December 2010	Swedish National Debt Office	The deposit limit was changed to 950,000 SEK on 1 July 2016, which at the time was valued at approximately 100,000 EUR. In 2021 it was raised to the current amount.

=== Rest of Europe ===
==== Albania ====
Deposit insurance in Albania is handled by the Albanian Deposit Insurance Agency (Agjencia e Sigurimit të Depozitave) and covers deposits up to a maximum of ALL2,500,000 (around US$23,000).

==== Andorra ====
Deposit insurance in Andorra is handled by the Institut Nacional Andorrà de Finances and covers deposits up to a maximum limit of EUR100,000 made by natural persons and legal entities, irrespective of their nationality or domicile.

==== Belarus ====
Deposit insurance in Belarus is handled by the Agency of Deposit Compensation (Агенцтва гарантаванага пакрыцця банкаўскіх укладаў) and covers 100% of deposits, but only those belonging to individuals, not organizations.

==== Iceland ====
Deposit insurance in Iceland is handled by Depositors' and Investors' Guarantee Fund (Tryggingarsjóður) and covers a minimum of 20,887 euros. However, the fund was drastically insufficient to cover the bank failures of the 2008–2012 Icelandic financial crisis, particularly Icesave. This case shows the limits of deposit insurance in protecting against systemic failure (as opposed to the collapse of a single bank or other institution), especially when a small country offers banking to international customers.

==== Liechtenstein ====
Deposit insurance in Liechtenstein is handled by the Liechtenstein Bankers Association and covers deposits up to CHF100,000.

==== Monaco ====
Banks operating in Monaco participate in the French deposit guarantee scheme (i.e., the Fonds de Garantie des Depôts (FGD)) on the same conditions as French banks.

==== Norway ====
Deposit insurance in Norway is handled by the Norwegian Banks' Guarantee Fund (Bankenes sikringsfond) and covers deposits up to 2 million NOK.

==== Russia ====
Russia enacted deposit insurance law in December 2003 and established the State Corporation Deposit Insurance Agency (DIA) in 2004. Until 2004, the Russian banking system was divided: obligations of state-owned Sberbank were guaranteed by law, while other banks were not insured in any way, creating an unfair advantage for Sberbank. The law addresses only individuals' deposits. Maximum compensation is limited to 1,400,000 roubles (equivalent to approximately 21,800 US dollars or 19,500 Euro at September 2016 exchange rate). As at January 2008, DIA funds exceeded 68 billion roubles (2.8 billion US dollars). There were 15 "insured events" (bankruptcy cases involving DIA intervention) in 2007 with resulting payout reaching 350 million roubles.

The agency is set up as a state-owned corporation, managed jointly by Central Bank and the government of Russia. DIA membership is mandatory requirement for any bank operating with private investors' money. Central Bank of Russia used the admission of banks into the DIA system to weed out unsound banks and money launderers. The murder of Andrey Kozlov, the Central Bank executive in charge of DIA admission, was directly linked to his non-compromising attitude to money launderers.

==== San Marino ====
Deposit insurance in San Marino is handled by the Central Bank of San Marino and covers deposits up to EUR50,000.

==== Switzerland ====
Switzerland has a privately operated deposit insurance system called Deposit Protection of Swiss Banks and Securities Dealers. It guarantees up to CHF 100,000 per bank customer per bank. Membership is compulsory for all banks and securities dealers that are regulated by the Swiss Financial Market Supervisory Authority (FINMA).

It had covered depositors in 1993 in the case of the failure of Spar- und Leihkasse Thun SLT, Thun. The next cases happened in 2007 with the liquidation of AB FIN SA (a securities dealer) in Lugano and with Kauphting (Luxembourg) SA, Geneva branch which was closed on 9 October 2008. Clients of this bank received the payments (at the time up to CHF 30,000 per customer) within three weeks.

==== Turkey ====
Deposit insurance in Turkey is handled by Savings Deposit Insurance Fund (Tasarruf Mevduatı Sigorta Fonu) and covers a maximum of ₺100,000 (approx. $15,000)

==== Ukraine ====
The system of deposit guarantee in Ukraine operates according to the Law of Ukraine "On Households Deposit Guarantee System" of 23 February 2012, Ref. number 4452-VI. and covers deposits up to ₴200,000 (about US$7,550 or €6,660 at September 2016 rates).

==== United Kingdom ====
Deposits in the United Kingdom are protected by the Financial Services Compensation Scheme, which will cover losses of up to £120,000 (previously £85,000) per account or twice those amounts for joint accounts. The Scheme is funded through a levy paid by financial services companies which are members of the Financial Conduct Authority and the Prudential Regulation Authority relative to the number of protected deposits they hold.

==== British Isles offshore ====
In response to the 2008 financial crisis, both Guernsey and Jersey introduced deposit compensation schemes. The Guernsey scheme was enacted in November 2008 and offers compensation of up to £50,000 per depositor, subject to an overall cap of £100 million in any five-year period. The scheme does not cover company or, with minor exceptions, trust accounts. The Jersey scheme was enacted in November 2009 and offers a similar level of protection.

The Isle of Man bank depositors' insurance scheme was introduced in 1991, to cover 75 percent of the first £15,000 per depositor per bank, but it was the October 2008 crisis-stricken Icelandic government's seizure of Kaupthing Bank in Iceland after the United Kingdom suspended the trading licence of Kaupthing's British subsidiary that compelled a radical revision of deposit insurance in the Isle of Man. Unable to secure reserves held by Kaupthing hf in Iceland or Kaupthing's British subsidiary to facilitate customer withdrawals, Kaupthing Singer & Friedlander (Isle of Man) Ltd. saw its Isle of Man banking licence suspended after operating less than a year, compelling the firm to request to be wound up. The Isle of Man government called an emergency session of the Tynwald parliament, which voted unanimously to bring the Isle of Man depositors' compensation scheme into line with the newly enlarged scheme in the United Kingdom, guaranteeing with immediate effect 100 percent of the first £50,000 per depositor per bank, and studying amendments for the subsequent inclusion within the scheme of corporate and charitable accounts. The Isle of Man government also pressed the Icelandic government to honour Kaupthing hf's irrevocable and binding guarantee of all depositors' funds held by Kaupthing Singer & Friedlander (Isle of Man) Ltd.

=== Oceania ===
==== Australia ====
The last bank failure in which Australian depositors lost money (and then only a minimal amount) was that of a trading bank, the Primary Producers Bank of Australia, in 1931 (Fitz-Gibbon and Gizycki 2001). Since the early 1930s, banking sector problems have been resolved without losses to depositors.

On 12 October 2008, as part of the response to the 2008 financial crisis, Australia set up the Financial Claims Scheme (FCS) to provide a government guarantee of 100% of all deposits with ADIs for three years in the event of an ADI failing. This was subsequently reduced to a maximum of $1 million per depositor per ADI. This measure was in addition to the mandates of APRA and ASIC to monitor Australian authorised deposit-taking institutions (ADIs), including banks, to ensure that their risks do not compromise the safety of depositors' funds. As part of the scheme, Australia was registered with the United States Securities and Exchange Commission, an act incorrectly described as the registration of Australia as a privately owned US corporation. From 1 February 2012, the guarantee was reduced to $250,000 per customer per ADI group. The guarantee also applies to foreign-owned banks, but only to deposit accounts in Australia and only with funds in Australian dollars.

The Australian Government Guarantee Scheme for Large Deposits and Wholesale Funding ended in 2015.

==== New Zealand ====
New Zealand announced the Crown Retail Deposit Guarantee Scheme, an opt-in scheme for retail deposits, on 12 October 2008. An extension to the scheme was announced on 25 August 2009 and the scheme ran until 31 December 2011. From 1 January 2012 bank deposits in New Zealand were no longer protected by the Government.

On 29 June 2023, New Zealand's parliament passed the Deposit Takers Act 2023, which directed creation of the Depositor Compensation Scheme, the country's first deposit insurance scheme. The DCS covers deposits up to NZD$100,000 and takes effect on 1 July 2025.

=== Asia ===
==== Bangladesh ====
In Bangladesh, a deposit insurance scheme was first introduced in 1984 by dint of "The Deposit Insurance Ordinance 1984". In July 2007, the Ordinance was repealed by an Act passed by the parliament called "The Bank Deposit Insurance Act 2000", which currently administers the Deposit Insurance system in Bangladesh. In accordance to the Act Bangladesh Bank is authorized to carry out a Fund called the Deposit Insurance Trust Fund (DITF). The DITF is administered and managed by a Trustee Board. In case of winding up of an insured bank, every depositor of the bank will be paid an amount not exceeding to BDT 100,000 as per "The Bank Deposit Insurance Act 2000".

==== China ====
China introduced preliminary proposals for a bank deposit insurance system, which will eventually cover all individual bank accounts for up to CNY 500,000. With the vast majority of Chinese savers holding far less than the maximum, and the central bank has calculated that 99.6% of depositors will be protected in full. The plan is expected to take effect in January 2015, and is intended by Chinese officials to increase certainty and help customers better assess risks and protect the nation's financial stability in the event of a crisis. China has one of the world's biggest deposit bases and as of October, bank deposits totaled about $18.2 trillion.

==== Hong Kong ====
Hong Kong Deposit Protection Board is an independent and statutory institution formed to manage and supervise the operation of Deposit Protection Scheme. The maximum protection amount of deposit was HK$100,000 in 2006 (when the Hong Kong Deposit Protection Board was set up). From 1 October 2024, the limit is raised to HK$800,000 (or equivalent amount in any other currency).

==== India ====
India introduced Deposit Insurance in 1962. The Deposit Insurance Corporation commenced functioning on 1 January 1962, under the aegis of the Reserve Bank of India (RBI). 1971 witnessed the establishment of another institution, the Credit Guarantee Corporation of India Ltd. (CGCI). In 1978, the DIC and the CGCI were merged to form the Deposit Insurance and Credit Guarantee Corporation (DICGC). Deposit insurance was hiked from ₹100,000 (one lakh rupees, approximately $1,325 as of March 2020) to ₹500,000 (5 lakh rupees, approximately $6,625 as of March 2020) in 2020.

==== Indonesia ====
Deposits in Indonesia is covered by Indonesia Deposit Insurance Corporation (IDIC) (Indonesian: Lembaga Penjamin Simpanan (LPS) ). IDIC is a legal independent institution which established based on the Law No. 24 of 2004 and in effect since 22 September 2005. It is a continuation and a perfection of government's deposit insurance program regarding blanket guarantee after the 1997 Asian financial crisis. The most significant change on deposit insurance program is the discarding of blanket guarantee, which deemed could initiate moral hazard, and becoming the limited guarantee.

Currently, the maximum amount of deposit insured is IDR 2,000,000,000 per depositor per bank. If a depositor has several accounts in one bank, the balance of all depositor's accounts will be cumulated to calculate the amount of deposit insured.

==== Japan ====
Deposit Insurance Corporation of Japan, founded in 1971 and based in Tokyo, oversees this function for institutes other than agricultural and fishery co-operative. The insurance protects up to 10 million Yen per depositor per financial institution.

For the agricultural and fishery co-operative (Norinchukin), the Agricultural and Fishery Co-operative Savings Insurance Corporation oversees this.

==== Malaysia ====
Malaysia introduced its Deposit Insurance System in September 2005. Malaysia Deposit Insurance Corporation (Malay: Perbadanan Insurans Deposit Malaysia, PIDM) is a statutory body formed under the Malaysia Deposit Insurance Corporation Act (Akta Perbadanan Insurans Deposit Malaysia). All commercial and Islamic banks, including foreign banks operating in Malaysia, are compulsory member institutions of PIDM. The maximum coverage limit is RM250,000 per depositor per member institution. Islamic accounts, joint accounts, trust accounts and accounts of sole proprietorships, partnerships or persons carrying on professional practices are separately insured up to the RM250,000 limit.

PIDM is also mandated to provide incentives for sound risk management in the financial system, as well as promote and contribute to the stability of the financial system.

==== Mongolia ====
During the 2008 financial crisis, Mongolia extended blanket guarantee to protect all bank deposits. At the time the guarantee coverage was 1.7 times higher than the state budget of the country.

On 10 January 2013, the Parliament of Mongolia adopted the Law on Insurance for Bank Deposits that establishes a mandatory insurance scheme for the protection of bank monetary deposits.

==== Pakistan ====
Deposits in Pakistan up to Rs. 500,000 is covered by the Deposit Protection Corporation (DPC), a subsidiary of the State Bank of Pakistan (SBP) established under the Deposit Protection Corporation Act, 2016.

==== Philippines ====
Deposits in the Philippines up to ₱1,000,000 is covered by the Philippine Deposit Insurance Corporation (PDIC). It was raised from the previous insurance coverage of PHP500,000.

==== Singapore ====
Deposits in Singapore is covered by the Singapore Deposit Insurance Corporation [SDIC] up to a maximum of $100,000 per bank or finance company for each individual depositor.

==== South Korea ====
South Korea covers bank deposits by Korea Deposit Insurance Corporation (KDIC) to maximum of 50 million wons per bank per each individual. KDIC, founded in 1996 just before the 1997 Asian financial crisis, proved its effectiveness through the crisis and gradually upgraded its capacity over the years.

Deposits made to credit unions of South Korea are not covered by KDIC, but the Korean Federation of Credit Cooperatives (KFCC) and the National Credit Union Federation of Korea (NCUFK) regulates their respective members and covers deposits to the same amount covered by KDIC.

==== Taiwan ====
Deposits in the Taiwan up to NT$3,000,000 is covered by the Central Deposit Insurance Corporation. It was raised from the previous insurance coverage of NT$1,500,000. (or equivalent in dollar or other foreign currency).

==== Thailand ====
The complete deposit protection system was introduced in Thailand by the establishment of the Deposit Protection Agency (DPA) on 11 August 2008, in accordance with the Deposit Protection Agency Act B.E. 2551. The objectives of the Agency as specified by law are providing protection to deposits in the financial institution system, administration of institutions subject to control under the Financial Institutions Businesses Act, and liquidation of financial institutions whose licenses have been revoked. Deposit in Thailand was fully guaranteed until 10 August 2011. From 11 August 2011 until 10 August 2012, the coverage dropped to 50 million baht per depositor per bank. Since then coverage has been limited to THB one million per depositor per bank.

Uzbekistan

Uzbekistan covers bank deposits by Deposit Guarantee Agency (DGA Uzbekistan) to maximum of 200 million uzbek soums per bank per each individual.

== Criticisms ==
Detractors of deposit insurance claim the schemes introduce a moral hazard issue, encouraging both depositors and banks to take on excessive risks. Without deposit insurance, banks would compete prudently for deposits because depositors would prefer safe banks over risky banks to guard their money. With deposit insurance, banks can take excessive risks because depositors do not fear for their deposits' safety and thus do not move their money to safer banks. The risks are shared by all banks, safe or risky.

If deposit insurance is provided by another business or corporation, like other insurance agreements, there is a presumption that the insurance corporation would either charge higher rates or refuse to cover banks that engaged in extremely risky behavior, which not only solves the problem of moral hazard but also reduces the risk of a bank run.

== See also ==
- Moral hazard, from the finance system point of view
- Bank run
- Financial crisis
- Diamond-Dybvig model, a model relating to runs on banks
