= International Association of Deposit Insurers =

Swiss non-profit organisation

- Abbreviation: IADI
- Formation: 2002; 23 years ago
- Headquarters: Basel, Switzerland
- President: Alejandro Lopez
- Secretary General: Eva Hüpkes
- Participants: 124 (96 members; 11 associates; 17 partners)
- Affiliations: Bank for International Settlements
- Website: iadi.org

The International Association of Deposit Insurers (IADI) was formed on 6 May 2002 with the purpose of sharing deposit insurance expertise with the world and contributing to the stability of financial systems as the standard setter for deposit insurance with a global and expanding membership.

The IADI is a non-profit organisation constituted under Swiss Law and a separate legal entity domiciled at the Bank for International Settlements (BIS) in Basel, Switzerland.

== About IADI ==
The International Association of Deposit Insurers (IADI) is the global standard-setting body for deposit insurance systems. It contributes to the stability of financial systems by enhancing the effectiveness of deposit insurance and promoting international cooperation on deposit insurance and bank resolution arrangements in active partnership with other international organisations. IADI draws upon its membership to provide guidance on the establishment or enhancement of effective deposit insurance systems, as well as technical assistance outreach, educational programs and research.

Founded in 2002, IADI is a non-profit organisation constituted under Swiss law and domiciled at the Bank for International Settlements (BIS) in Basel, Switzerland. Along with the other standard setters and committees hosted and supported by the BIS, IADI is a part of the Basel Process, sharing with its host and peers the common goal of global financial stability and ensuring that jurisdictions’ financial systems operate effectively, support economic growth, and interact in an increasingly global environment.

IADI's standards, outlined in its Core Principles for Effective Deposit Insurance Systems (Core Principles), are part of the Key Standards for Sound Financial Systems of the Financial Stability Board (FSB); and are used in the Financial Sector Assessment Program (FSAP) reviews conducted by the International Monetary Fund (IMF) and the World Bank. As a member of the FSB's Resolution Steering Group, IADI contributes to the design of international standards and guidance for effective resolution regimes.

== Governance and organisation ==
IADI is governed by the General Meeting of its Members and IADI Executive Council (EXCO). The General Meeting elects the officers of IADI, including the President and Treasurer. As of 2023, the President was Alejandro Lopez, chief executive officer of the Seguro de Depósitos Sociedad Anónima of Argentina.

EXCO ensures the smooth functioning of IADI's affairs, and is structured as an inclusive body which involves the active participation of its membership. As of 2023, there were 25 EXCO members and they are elected at the IADI Annual General Meeting (AGM), typically to serve three-year terms. EXCO establishes committees to support IADI's objectives.

== Leadership ==
IADI Presidents
Term	Dates	Name	Citizenship
1	2002–2007	Jean-Pierre Sabourin	Canada
2	2007–2012	Martin Gruenberg	United States
3	2012–2015	Jerzy Pruski	Poland
4	2015–2017	Thomas Hoenig	United States
5	2017–2020	Katsunori Mikuniya	Japan
6	2020–2022	Yury Isaev	Russia
7	2022–	Alejandro Lopez	Argentina

IADI Secretaries General
Term	Dates	Name	Citizenship
1	2002–2008	John Raymond LaBrosse	Canada
2	2008–2010	Donald Inscoe	United States
3	2010–2013	Carlos Isoard	Mexico
4	2013–2016	Gail Verley	United States
5	2016–2023	David K. Walker	Canada
6	2023–	Eva Hüpkes	Switzerland

== Core principles for effective deposit insurance systems ==
To enhance deposit insurance effectiveness and meet its Members’ needs, IADI undertakes research and issues core principles and supporting guidance. The Core Principles for Effective Deposit Insurance Systems (Core Principles) were first issued by IADI and the Basel Committee on Banking Supervision (BCBS) in June 2009, and updated by IADI in October 2014. IADI's Core Principles promote best international standards in deposit insurance and support the stability and soundness of financial systems. IADI, in collaboration with the BCBS, IMF, World Bank Group, European Forum of Deposit Insurers and European Commission developed the Methodology for the Assessment of Compliance with the Core Principles. Such assessments include self-assessments and Financial Sector Assessment Programs (FSAPs) reviews conducted by IMF and the World Bank, as well as country and peer review programs conducted by the FSB.

== See also ==
- Financial Stability Board
- Bank for International Settlements
- International Monetary Fund
- World Bank Group
- International Association of Insurance Supervisors
