= Mbakara =

Word for westerners in the Annang, Efik and Ibibio languages

Mbakara is a word in the Annang, Efik and Ibibio languages used for those in the Western world (Waddell 1891). Rather than be seen as a normative category, it is the description of a relationship between Africans in the West African coast of Calabar and their European counterparts from the West with whom they traded. The name Mbakara has been interpreted by various writers as a shortened form of the phrase Mbaka nkara in Annang and Ibibio meaning "divide and rule". Among those groups, as elsewhere, Westerners came to be identified with colonialism.

== History ==
Mbakara was the highest grade of Abon, a masquerade representing the spirit of the dead among the Efik of the Cross River Basin of Nigeria, and was introduced by Asibong Ekondo in about the 15th century. Individuals who were initiated in the cult could not take the title until they were deemed fully qualified and few could attain the position.

Membership was not an issue since by law no European could be accosted by the Abon or Ekpe. Usage of the title soon passed into the popular discourse and carried the connotation of power, influence and authority. Slaves taken from the area took the name with them and addressed the white Europeans as Mbakara. In the Caribbean and part of the Deep South of the United States, where the slaves were sold, the name was anglicized and it became Bacra, Buckra and Buckaroo and referred to a white master, slave hunter or someone with authority.

=== Doubtful accuracy ===
As the description was given by the white British researcher Waddell during the height of European colonialism, his account is possibly racially prejudiced, if not inventive in nature. The alleged association of mbakara with a negative deity, such as Abon, the spirit of death, might be an insider's joke played on the unsuspecting European outsider as well. It goes without saying that the mbakara as a putative figure of authority has not been corroborated by later reports.
