= List of villages in Kano State =

Villages in Kano State, Nigeria

This is a list of villages and settlements in Kano State, Nigeria organised by local government area (LGA) and district/area (with postal codes also given). Unguwar dorawa in Gwarzo and Munchika village in Ungogo local government areas were included in the list.

== By postal code ==
LGA	District / Area	Postal code	Villages
Ajingi	Ajingi	713103	Ajingi; Balare; Chula; Dabir-Karawa; Dagaji; Dundun; Fagawa; Fulatan; Gafasa; Gurduba; Jiyaiya; Kara Makama; Kunkurawa; Kwari; Kyaberi; Sakalawa; Toranke; Ungwar Bai; Yanwawa; Zagon Gulya
Bagwai	Bagwai	701104	Alajawa; Badodo; Bagwai; Rimin dako; Daddauda; Dangada; Dungurawa; Gadanya; Gwanki; Galawa; Gogori; Gurdo; Jarimawa; Joben-Yamma; Kiyawa; Kwajali; Majingini; Riminbai; Romo; Santar Lungu; Sare-Sare; Sarkin Iya; Ungwan Waimma; Wuro Bagga; Yar Tofa
Bebeji	Bebeji	711104	Anadariya; Baguda; Bebeji; Churta Biki; Damau; Dawakin Dogo; Durumawa; Gargai; Gunki; Gwarmai; Jibga; Kofa; Kuki; Rahama; Ranka; Ranta; Tariwa; Wak; Yak; Yakun; Yanshere
Bichi	Bichi	703101	Aawa; Abakur; Badume; Beguwa; Belli; Bichi; Chiromawa; D/Dorawa; Daddo; Damargu; Daminawa; Danzabuwa; Dokoki; Fagwalo; Garun Bature; Hagawa; Hugulawa; Iyawa; Kakari; Kaukau; Kawaje; Kungu; Kwamarawa; Kyauta; Malikawar Garu; Malikawar Sarari; Marga; Muntsira; Rimaye; Sabo; Sanakur; Saye; Sum Sum; Tinki; Tsaure; Tukubi; Waire; Yan Bundu; Yan Gwarzo; Yan Lami; Yandutse; Zukumi
Bunkure	Bunkure	710103	Barkum; Bono; Chirin; D/Dundu; Dundu; Dususu; Falingo; Gabo; Gafan; Garanga; Gora; Gurjiya; Gwamma; Gwaneri; Jalabi; Jallorawa; Jaroji; Karnawa; Kokotawa; Kumurya; Sabon ruwa; Satigal; Shiye; Tsamabaki; Tudungali; Tugugu; Zanga
Dala	Dala (Rural)	700103	Aburawa; Bafin/Ruwa; Gadankaya; Dandunshe; Fuska Arewa; Gandu; K/Lunkwi; K/Waika; Man/Ladan; Tudun Yola; Waika; Yalwa; Yan/Tandu
Dambatta	Danbatta	702104	Ajumawa; Barebari; Danratta; Danya; Diggol; Dukewa; Dungurumi; F/Dashi; Fayam-Fayam; Fogolawa; Galoru; Gwalaiba; Gwanda; Gwarabjawa; Gwauran Maje; Hazo; Kadandani; Katsarduwa; Kore; Kwasauri; Mahuta; Nassarawa; Rade; Ruwantsa; Sansan; Satame; Tabo; Takai; Yam Mawa; Yambawa; Yanlada; Zago
Dawakin Kudu	Dawaki	713104	Behun; Dabakwari; Danbagina; Dasan Dosan; Dawaki; Dawakin Kudu; Dawakji; Gano Gumaka; Gurjiya; Jido; Kadawa; Kamgata; Kantsi; Kanwa; Kwagwar Kaza; M. Mata; Mabarin Taba; Muras; Runa; Santolo; Sarai; T/Gabas; Takai; Tamburawa; Tanagar; Tar Tofa; Tsakuwa; Ungwar Duniya; Yanbarci; Yanfari; Yankatsare; Yargay; Zogarawa
Dawakin Tofa	Dawakin Tofa	701101	Alajawa; B/Tumau; Babban Ruga; Badau; Bagari; Bambarawa Nasara; Bankaura; Chedi; Dandalama; Dawanau; Dnaguguwa; Dungurawa Kwa; F/Kawo; Jalli; Kaleku; Kunnawa; Kwidawa; Marke; Rumi; Sharkakiya; Tattarawa; Tumfefi; Ungwar Jobenkun; Ungwar Rimi; Yanrutu; Yelwa
Doguwa	Doguwa	710105	Bakarfa; Bebeji; Dadabo; Dadinkowa; Dandoki; Dariyar Kudu; Doguwa; Falgore; Fanyabo; G/Makera; G/Shere; Jangefe; Katsinawa; Lungu; Mahuta; Maigodo; Maikwadira; Makarfi; Malamawa; Maraku; Muchia; Murai; Pegi; Ragada; Ririwai; Sabon Kwara; Sabuwar; Shiburu; Surutwawa; Tagwaye; Tanalafiya; Tilanbawa; Tsauni; U/Masama; U/Tanko; U/Turai; Ungwar Tsohon-Sarki; Zenabi
Fagge	Fagge/Waje	700102	Waje
Gabasawa	Gabasawa	702102	Chikawa; Dadin Duniya; Dagar; Darinawa; Doga; Gabasawa; Gambawar Kanawa; Garun Danga; Gumawa; Gunduwawa; Guruma; Jigawa; Jigoron Kanawa; Jijitar; Joda; K/Yunbu; Kafamai; Kagadama; Karmami; Kawo; Kiyawa; Kumbo; Kwakwashi; Larabawa; Mazangudu; Mazauta; Mekiya; Saiye; Santsi; Sauna; Shana; Tagwamma; Tankarau; Tofai; Wadugur; Wailare; Wasarde; Yadai; Yautar Arewa; Yautar Kudu; Yamar Fulani; Yandake; Yangwam; Yar Zabaina; Yunbu;Zaidawa; Zakirai; Zango;Zangon Gabasawa; Zugachi
Garko	Garko	712101	Buda; Dal; Garinali; Garko; Gurjiya; Kafin Malamai; Katimari; Kawo; Kera; Kwas; Lamire; Maida; Makadi; Raba; Sanni; Sarina; Tsakuwardal; Yarka; Zakarawa
Garun Mallam	Garun Malam	711103	Agawa; Chiromawa; Dumati; Durawar Sallan; Garun Babba; Garun Malam; Jobawa; Kuiwe Dan Maura; Yadakwari; Yanabawa; Zango
Gaya	Gaya	713102	Aku; Amarawa; Argida; Balan; Bangashe; Fani Dau; G/Sarki; Gamarya; Gamoji; Gaya; Gomo; Gul; Hausawa; Jibawa; Jobe; Kademi; Kazurawa; Kera; Larau; Maimakawa; Masabai; Moda; Shagogo; Wudilawa; Y. Audu; Yankau; Zanbur
Gezawa	Gezawa	702101	Abasawa; Amarawa; Andawa; Aujarawa; Babawa; Badan; Bangare; Bujawa; Charo; Dagazam; Dan Madanho; Danawa; Danja; Danzaki; Dausayi; Gawo; Gezawa; Gidi; Goforo; Gunduwawa; Indabo; Jogana; Katewa; Kutil; Kwagwar; Kwasan Kwami; L/Kwagwar; Ranawa; Sabo Gezawa; T/Babba; Tofa; Tsalle; Tsamiyar Kara; Tumbau; Uran; Wangari; Wasardi; Yangwan; Yarkogi; Zango
Gwarzo	Gwarzo	704101	Badari; Baderi; Dakwara; Dan Kado; Dan Madadi; Dan Nafada; Dandawa; Danja; Dogami; Fada; Fadamar Fulani; Gangare; Garin Sarki Baka; Getso; Unguwar dorawa; Gwarzo; Jaga; Jama Yan Turu; Kagon Kura; Karar Tudu; Karkari; Kazoge; Korkari; Koyar; Kutama; Kwami; Lakwaya; Maimika; Makan Wata; Mariri; Marori; Moda; Naibi; Nassarawa; Ratawa; Rije (Riji); Sabon Birni; Sabon Gwarzo; Salihawa; Tsauni; Tumfafi; Ungwar Tudu; Wari Kado; Yadau; Yambashi; Yangaruza; Zangarmawa
Kabo	Kabo	704103	Balan; Baskore; Binashi; Dan Maliki; Dugabau; Durun; Gabasawa; Godiya; Garo; Gommo; Goza; Gude; Hauwade; Kabo; Kanwa Zango; Kanya; Karangiyare; Katsinawa; Kazo; Malam Gajere; Massanawa; Nasarawa; Sani; Shabawa; Ungwan Wusama; Walawa; Wari; Yadau
Karaye	Karaya	704104	Adama; Barbaji; Bauni; Citama; Dadinkowa; Danzuwa; Daura; Daurawa; Figi; Jajaye; Kalako; Karaye; Karshi; Kumbu Gawa; Kwanyawa; Kyari; Ma; Nasarawa; Saunagari; Tofa; Turawa; Unguwar Randi; Unguwar Alhazawa; Unguwar Dawa; Yola; zauna gari 1; zauna gari 2; yola 1; yola 2; yola adama; ma 1; ma 2;
Kibiya	Kibiya	710102	Agiri; Bacha; Burmuni; Chaibo; Dungu; Durba; Dususu; Falange; Fammar; Fanchi; Gadako; Gari; Gingiya; Gunda; Jabanni; Jar Mawa; Kadigana; Kibiya; Kuluki; Kure; Lausu; Madachi; Nariya; Sanda; Sarari; Shingi; Tarai; U/Liman
Kiru	Kiru	711105	Baawa; Bauda; Dangora; Danshoshiya; Dashi; Daurawa; Dum; Jamar Barde; Jibya; Kadangaru; Kankan; Kiru; Kogo; Lamin Kwoi; Mallam Bature; Maraku; Maska; Rangas; Sagi; Sarkama; Tsaudawa; U/Isakuwa; Ungwar Kaka; Ungwar Kwari; Ungwar Musa; Yako; Yalwa; Yam; Kafin Maiyaki; Kariya; Gajale; Unguwar Makera; Alhazawa; Sobon Garin Alhazawa; Unguwar Maza,Zuwo
Kumbotso	Kumbotso	700104	Bechi; Challawa; Damfami; Dan Gwauro Hago; Dan Gwauro Illiyasu; Dan Maliki; Danbare; Dangwauro; Farawa; Gaida; Guringawa; Gwazaya; Hawandawaki; Kayi Panshekara; Krinbo; Kumbotso; Kure Ken; Kusaba; Kuyan Ta Inna; Kuyan Tasidi; Limana; Maidinawa; Mariri; Panshekara; Runkusawa; Samegu; Sarkin Shanu; Shekar Barde; Shekar Madaki; Tamburawa; U/Rimi; Umarawa; Unguwar Yamu; Wailari; Yankusa; Yanshana
Kunchi	Kunchi	703103	B/Sadawa; Baje; Birkin; Dankwai; Dunbulin; Dunkwai; G/Sheme; Gwadama; Gwarmai; Jodade; Kaya; Kuku; Kunchi; Luka; Magawata; Matan Fada; Pollw; Shamakawa; Shuwaki; Tofawa; Unguwar Gyartai; Yan Kifi; Yandadi
Kura	Kura	711101	Danhassan; Dukawa; Gamadam; Gundutse; Imawa; Imawakore; Karfi; Kosawa; Kunshama; Kura; Mudawa; Rugar Duka; Sadauki; Sayawa; Shafawa; Tofa; Yakasai; Yalwa
Madobi	Madobi	711102	Abarchi; Agalawa; Bakinkogi; Burji; Chiinkoso; Daburau; Dan Maryame; Dan'auta; Danzo Gari; Gazana; Gora; Kafin Agur; Kanwa; Kaura Mata; Kubarachi; Kundurum; Kwankwaso; Madobi; Jirgwai; Chikawa; Ningawa; Rikadawa; Ruga; Yakun
Makoda	Makoda	702105	Bakarari; Chidari; Danya; Dunawa; Ganji; Jibya; Koguna; Mai-Unguwa; Maitse Dau; Nakarari; Sabon Ruwa; Tabo; Tangaji; Yamawa; Zago
Minjibir	Minjibir	702103	Abudakawa; Agalawa; Agarandawa; Azore; Bagurawa; Beguwa; Damusawa; Dauni; Daurawa; Dingin; Dukawa; Dukuji; Dumawa; Farawa; Farke; Gandirwawa; Garke; Gasgainu; Gawo; Gezagezawa; Goda; Gurjiya; Gyaranya; Jamaare; Kankarawa; Kantama Baba; Kazawa; Koya; Kuchir Chiwa; Kukana; Kunya; Kurma; Kuro; Kuru; Kwarkiya; Ladan; Madawa; Magarawa; Marke; Minjibir; Runfa; Sanbaluna; Sarbl; Shagen; Tsage; Tsakuwa; Tsankiya; Tunkunawa; Wakamawa; Wasai; Yabawa; Yajin Rana; Yargaya; Yola; Yukana; Z/Dangwali; Zabainawar; Zango; Zura
Rano	Rano	710101	Barnawa; Burum; Dususu; Faran; Fassi; Fiyaran; Gorabi; Jellorawa; Juma; Kaiwa; Kalambu; Kundun; Kunkura; Lafsu; Madaci; Mashe; Rano; Rurum; Saji; Sanda; Shike; Tofa; Torankawa; Tsaure; Tum; Yado; Yalwa; Yankanchi; Zambur; Zanyau; Zurgu
Rimin Gado	Rimin Gado	701102	Butubutu; D/Gulu; Dan Isa; Gulu; Indabo; Janguza; Jili; Juli; Karofi Yashi; Maigari; Rimin Gado; Rinji; Sakaratsa; Tamawa; Tuji; Ungwan Rimi; Wangara; Yalwa; Yan Kuni; Yango
Rogo	Rogo	704105	Bari; Beli; Dan Sambo; Dederi; Falgore; Fulatan; Gidanjaro; Gwan Gwan; Kadafa; Kadana; Makwanyawa; Nasarawa; Rogo; Ruwanbago; Tsohuwar/Rogo; Uguwar Sundu; Ung. Makera; Yammali; Zamfarawa; Zarewa
Shanono	Shanono	704102	Alajawa; Bakwami Bakwami; Bayan Dutse; Danja; Dutsen Danbakoshi; Fagawa; Farin Ruwa; Gangare; Goda; Godawa; Goran Dutse; Gundantuwo; Hauri; Janja; Janmaza; Jigawa; Kadamu; Kakamu; Kandutse; Kazaga; Kofar Kumburi; Kokiya; Koya; Kundila; Laini; Magashin Fulani; Rimantaini; Shakogi; Shanono; Takama; Taujeri; Tsaure; Unguwar Maladawa; Unguwar Soda; Yan Gobe; Yan Shado
Sumaila	Sumaila	712102	Alfindi; Bagagare; Baji; Bango; Beta; Birminawa; Bunturu; Dambazau Yamma; Dando; Dantsawa; Doguwar Dorowa; Doka; Faradachi; Farin Dutse; Gajigi; Gala; Gani; Garfa; Gediya; Giginya Biyar; Gwanda; Jisai; Kanawa; Kawo; Madobi; Magami; Masu; Matugwai; Rimi; Riyi; Rumo; Sabongida; Sitti; Sumaila; Yamma
Takai	Takai	712103	Abaldu; Bagwaro; Danbazau Gabas; Durbunde; Fajewa; Falali; Gamawa; Hantsai; Huguma; K/Diribo; Kachako; Kafin Farin Ruwa; Karfi; Kayarda; Kogo; Kuka; Kurido; Lafiya; Langwami; Sakwaya; Takai; Toto; Tudun Wada; Tumfusha; Zuga
Tarauni	Tarauni	700101	Tokarawa
Tofa	Tofa	701103	Dindere; Doka; Dokadawa; Dutwatsu; Fofa; Ginsawa; Kadawa; Kazardawa; Kwami; Lambu; Langel; Rinji; Sabon Gari Katsalle; Yango; Yanoko; Yarimawa
Tsanyawa	Tsanyawa	703102	Baje; Bumai; Daddarawa; Daddarawa Tsohuwa; Dakwai; Dumbulum; Farsa; Gozarki; Gurun; Harbau; Jamar'a; Jigilawa; Kabagiwa; Katsalle; Kokai; Kuka; Kwandawa; Nassarawa; Rafin Tsamiya; Runji; Tatsan; Tsanyawa; Yakanawa; Yammanman; Yan'awaki; Yancibi; Yanganau; Yankamaye; Zarogi
Tudun Wada	Tudun Wada	710104	Baburi; Bul; Burun Burun; Dalawa; Fala; Faskar Wambai; Gazobi; Hayindenu; Jammaje; Jandutse; Jangefe; Jeli; Jita; Kafin Dalawa; Kankanu; Karefa; Nata Ala; Rugurugu; Ruwan Tabo; Shuwaki; Shuwi; Sumana; Tudun Wada; Wuna; Yar Fulani; Yar Yasa; Yarmaraya; Yelwa
Ungogo	Ungogo	700105	Adaraye; Alhrani; Amar Zakawa; Bacirawa; Bagujan; Ciromawa; Dankunkuru; Dausayi; Doka; Dorayi; Fanisau; Garinlya; Gayawa; Gera; Hoto; Indabo; Inkyan; Inusawa Babba; Inusawa Karawa; Jajira; Kadawa; Kakurun; Kanawa; Kansuwa; Kantsi; Karo; Kauranchi; Kawari; Kera; Koranci; Kududu Fawa; Kwajalawa; Kyaran;Munchika; Malamawa; Mushuni; Rafin Mallam; Rangaza; Rijiyar Dinya; Rijiyar Zaki; Rimi; Rimi Gata; Rimi Zakara; Sabon Gari; Tarda; Tudun Fulani; Umasawa; Wachani; Watari; Wujanare; Yada Kunya; Yan Ali; Yanmata; Yola; Z/Babba; Zango; Zaura Dan Baba; Zikaya
Warawa	Warawa	713105	A'Giwa; Amarawa; Dan Lasan; Galadima; Ganakako; Garu Dau; Giwarwan; Goget; Gumaka; Jigawa; Kanta; Kanwa; Katarkawa; Kinchau; Ladimakole; Limawa; Madarin; Manyan Mata; Tamburawa Gabas; Token; Wambantu; Warawa; Warkai; Yan-Dalla; Yan-Tofa; Yangizo
Wudil	Wudil	713101	Achika; Audaga; Bange; Buda; Dagumawa; Dal; Darki; Gariko; Garin Ali; Guna; Gware; Indabo; Juma; Kafin Malami; Kausani; Kawo; Kwas; Lajawa; Maida; Makadi; Makera; Mandawari; Raba; Tsakuwadal; Utai; Wudil; Yarka

== By electoral ward ==
Below is a list of polling units, including villages and schools, organised by electoral ward.

LGA	Ward	Polling Unit Name
Ajingi	Ajingi	Dugwal, Near H/H House I; Dugwa, Near H/H House II; Kumawa Bori, Near, W/H House; Malikawa/Zarawa, Ajingi Yamma Ps I; Malikawa/Zarawa, Ajingi Yamma Ps II; Marayar Soba, Gidan Malam; S/G/Malikawa, Ajingi Yamma Ps I; S/G/Malikawa, Ajingi Yamma Ps II; S/G Dugwal, Ajingi Yamma Ps I; S/G Dugwal, Ajingi Yamma Ps II; S/G Sakalawa, Ajingi Yamma Ps III; Sagalawa C/Gari Sagalawa P. S.; Ung/Arewa, Ajingi Library I; Ung/Arewa, Ajingi Library II; Ung/Arewa, Ajingi Library III; Ung/Kudu, Ajingi Sp. S I; Ung/Kudu, Ajingi Sp. S II; Ung/Kudu, Ajingi Sp. S III; Ung Bori, Ajingi Dispersary I; Ung Bori, Ajingi Dispersary II
Ajingi	Balare	Anchacha/Kaudai, Kaudai Road Side - (Road); Balare Gabas, Balare P. S. I; Balare Gabas, Balare P. S. II; Balare Gabas, Balare P. S. III; Balare Yamma, Balare P. S.; Chiromawa, Tsamiyar Gawo; Fulatan C/Gari, Fulantan Ps; Fulantan Gabas, Fulatan Clinic; Gya Dawa/Labujan, Labujan Ps.; Kaura, Tsamiyar, Uba; Shadakaji/Garwa, Shadakaji Ps; Tse Burawa Gabas/Yamma W/H/ House; Yanbakon Fulani, Y/Fulani Ps
Ajingi	Chula	Chula C/Gari Ps I; Chula C/Gari Ps II; Chula C/Gari Ps III; Chula K/Kawo/Kudu, Village H/House I; Chula K/Kawo/Kudu, Village H/House II; Daddawa/Jigawa, Near Kankare; Gurji, Near W/H-House; Guzawa/Yautawa, Guzawa Ps; Kawari C/Gari, Kawari P. S. I; Kawari C/Gari, Kawari P. S. II; Kera, Kera Dispensary; Sabaru J/Dali, J/Dali Ps; Yankinta J/Banago, Yankinta Ps
Ajingi	Dabin Kanawa	Dabawa G/Yamma, D/K P. S.; Fagawa Galadima, F/G. P. S. I; Fagawa Galadima, F/G. P. S. II; Fagawa Galadima, F/G. P. S. III; Fagawa Kawari, F/Kawari Ps.; Fagawa Tudu, F/Tudu P. S.; Marita C/Gari, Marita P. S I; Marita C/Gari, Marita P. S II; Sagera, Sagera; Tilin-Tilin I; Tilin-Tilin II
Ajingi	Dundun	Digwal, Near W/H/House; Dundun C/Gari, Dundun P. S I; Dundun C/Gari, Dundun P. S II; Dundun C/Gari, Dundun P. S III; Kasko, Near W/H House; Maigana, Maigana P. S.; Maka, Near Tsamiya; S/G/Dundun, Near Wakili House I; S/G/Dundun, Near Wakili House II; S/Saria/Mumuniyal, Mumuniyal P. S.; Unbunushi/Yamma/Gabias, Unb P. S. (Gabas); Ung/Galadima, Maidawa P. S; Yanwawa C/Gari, Yan. P. S.; Wailare Alhajeri, N V/Head; Wurawa Yamma / Gabas, W/H House
Ajingi	Gafasa	Asayaya, Near W/H House; Burunbusu, Near W/H House; Danmalam Pri . Sch I; Danmalam P. S II; Dangyala/Huambarawa, Hm P. S - Humburawa; Dara, Near W/H House; Falakawa, Near W/H House (Falankawa) I; Falakawa, Near W/H House(Falankawa) II; Gafasa Walawa, Near Main Road; Jiyayya/Humbunare, Jiyayya P. S; Kebberi/Ung. Alh. Ung. Alh.; Kwaido T/Bareyi, Near W/H House; Maimolo, Maimolo P. S; Malawa/ Ewtegel- Malawa P. S; Tsarambai, Tsarambai P. S; Turaji R/Ludayi, Near W/House; Yafai, Near W/H House
Ajingi	Gurduba	Dabawa Y/Ung. D/Near W/H House; Gurduba G/Gona, Gurduba P. S I; Gurduba G/Gona, Gurduba P. S II; Gulya/Agalawa, Gulya P. S; Gurjiya, Gurjiya P. S; Gulya C/Gari P. S I; Gulya C/Gari P. S II; Gulya C/Gari P. S III; Kalawa, Near W/H House; Kullumi/Wailare, Kulumi Ps; Malawa Gawa, Malawa Ps; Ung/Yamma/Kyaurawa Ward House; Yadagammo, Near W/H House
Ajingi	Kunkurawa	Gunki, Gunki P. S; Kara/Naniyaka P. S; Kara Makama, Kara Ps. I; Kara Makama, Kara Ps. II; Kara Makama, Kara Ps. III; Kara Makama, Dispensary I; Kara Makama, Dispensary II; Kara Makama, Dispensary III; Kunkurawa/Makera, Kunkurawa P. S I; Kunkurawa/Makera, Kunkurawa P. S II; Kunkurawa Kaniyaka, K/Gabas P. S; Kiroro, Kiroro P. S; Makarya, Makarya P. S I; Makaryau Makarya P. S II; Mabuga Asayaya, Mabuga P. S I; Mabuga Asayaya, Mabuga P. S II; Mabuga Asayaya, Mabuga P. S III; Mabuga Asayaya, Mabuga P. S IV; Tsafau, Near Wakili House; Tsame/Sukuma, Near W/H
Ajingi	Toranke	Biyamisu, Biyamisu P. S I; Biyamisu, Biyamisu P. S II; Burtu/Illori, Near Ward H/House I; Burtu/Illori, Near Ward H/House II; Dagaji, Near Ward Head House; Ganuwa, Ganuwa P. S; Ganike, Near Ward Head House; Gunsu Near Ward Head House; Gidan Alhaji Wakili House; Jibidi/Makaya/Rufai, Jibidi P. S; Kara Dagaji, K/Dagaji P. S; Komayu Gurgur, Gurgur P. S; Laraba Zango, Toranke Ps I; Laraba Zango, Toranke Ps II; Laraba Zango, Toranke J. S. S. I; Laraba Zango, Torane J. S. S. II; Malai/Buyagi/Torankayi M/P. S; Nasarawa/Kowoni, S/G Dosa P. S I; Nasarawa/Kowoni, S/G Dosa P. S II; S/G Dosa, Malai P. S I; S/G Dosa, Malai P. S II; Sharada, Sharada P. S; Tanki, U/Arewa, Toranke Clinic I; Tanki, U/Arewa, Toranke Clinic II; Tsoma Gora, Near W/H House I; Tsoma Gora, Near W/H House II; Toranke, Toranke, Near W/H
Ajingi	Ungawar Bai	Badawa/Agamawa, U/Bai P. S; Gagarawa/Asayaya, Gagarawa P. S; Kadiri C/Gari, Kadiri P. S I; Kadiri C/Gari, Kadiri P. S II; Kadiri C/Gari, Kadiri P. S III; Kara Karama/Babba, Near W/H/H; Kyaurawa/Durmai/Jigawa, Jigawa P. S; Mago/Dambai, Mago P. S; Nasara/Korofi, Near W/H House; Ung. Bai Ung Bai P. S I; Ung. Bai Ung Bai P. S II; Ung. Bai Ung Bai P. S III
Albasu	Albasu Central	Badawa-Women Central (Albasu) I; Badawa-Women Central (Albasu) II; Jemo; Jeriya; Jigar; Kargo; Tarefa/Baggaw0; Ungwar Fawa Ventinary I; Ungwar Fawa Ventnary II; Ung. Gabas; Ung. Kudu I; Ung. Kudu II; Ung. Yamma I; Ung. Yamma II
Albasu	Bataiya	Bataiya Gari-Bataya P. S I; Bataiya Gari-Bataya P. S II; Baura; Dabaro-Dabaro P. S; Gidan Hardo; Gidan Isau; Kwangwarmi; Lafiya; Mangari- Gari; Mangari Tasha; Sukuma Bataiya Islamiya; Ungwar- Ja
Albasu	Chamarana	Chamarana Gari I; Chamarana Gari II; Duja I; Duja II; Ganuawa I; Ganuawa II
Albasu	Daho	Biskin; Bura; Burungui; Daho Gari I; Daho Gari II; Daho Gari III; Farantama; Gatarin Daho; Gatarin Farantama; Jahunawa/Tarefa; Jahunawa Jaudari; Jibiri; Ung Jeji; Zuwan Hawa
Albasu	Fanda	Fanda, Sabongari I; Fanda, Sabongari II; Fanda, Tsohuwa; Hamdullahi I; Hamdullahi II; Hamdullahi III; Hamdullahi IV; Rubun; Shashuwai I; Shashuwai II; Umbara; Wuro Mango
Albasu	Faragai	Chilori; Dogon Marke; Faraga, Jss (Faragai) I; Faraga, Jss (Faragai) II; Faraga P. S. (Faragai) I; Faraga P. S. (Faragai) II; Faraga P. S. (Faragai) III; Gandakanye; Gwagwarandan; Magamaru; S/Garin Naira I; S/Garin Naira II; S/Garin Naira P. R. P
Albasu	Gagarame	Aminadan; Fikaji; Gagarame Gari; Ganjiro; Ganuwa; Jirago Son Allah; Kauyen Gabas; Larabawa; Maje Arewa; Maje Kudu; Makera; Rijiyar Ganji; Rubu; Sabuwa Kasuwa; Wuro Balli/ Gidan Haro; Zakailawa, Zakailawa; Zakailawa; Zananne
Albasu	Hungu	Hungu Gari I; Hungu Gari II; Sittika; Yaura Gabasawa; Yaura Gadandan; Yaura Gari; Zango Duna I; Zango Duna II; Zangon Gala I; Zangon Gala II
Albasu	Tsangaya	Biyauri; Gadaja; Harga I; Harga II; Jarmai I; Jarmai II; Jarmai III; Lekire; Ribo; Tsalawa I; Tsalawa II; Tsangaya Gari I; Tsangaya Gari II; Tsangaya Islamiya I; Tsangaya Islamiya II; Yawurma
Bagwai	Bagwai	Daddauda C/Gari I; Daddauda C/Gari II; Gargari I; Gargari II; Bagwai Pri. Sch. I (Kwatawa I); Bagwai Pri. Sch. II (Kwatawa II); A. M. Educ (Kwatawa III); Tajwid Isl. I (Limawa I); Limawa II; Limawa III; Mabuga I; Mabuga II; Rinji I; Rinji II; Rinji III; Sabon Gari I; Sabon Gari II; Tajwid Isl. II (Sarkin Rafi I); Women Isl. (Sarkin Rafi II); Sarkin Rafi II; Ung. Kosa I; Ung. Kosa II
Bagwai	Dangada	Dangada Pri. Sch. I (Dangada C/Gari I); Dangada Pri. Sch. II (Dangada C/Gari II); Rigar Dadi; R/Isau Isl. (Rigar Isau I); Rigar Isauii; Ruwan Jiba I; Ruwan Jiba II; Jibaga Pri. Sch. (Jibaga I Jigaba); Jibaga II Jigaba; K/Maiko Pri. Sch. I (Kafin Maiko I); K/Maiko Pri. Sch. II (Kafin Maiko II); Kariya Pri. Sch. (Kariya C/Gari I); Kariya C/Gari II; Islamiyya Goda (Zango I); Gss Dangada (Zango II)
Bagwai	Gadanya	Daneji; Daganya Karofi I; Daganya Karofi II; Gadanya Kofar Gabas I; Gadanya Kofar Gabas II; Gadanya Cps I (Gadanya Kofar Yamma I); Gadanya Cps II (Gadanya Kofar Yamma II); Kwangwai Pri. Sch. I (Gadanya Kwangwai I); Kwangwai Pri. Sch. II (Gadanya Kwangwai II); J/Yamma Pri. Sch. I (Jauben Yamma I); J/Yamma Pri. Sch. II (Jauben Yamma II); Mojin-Kanawa I; Mojin-Kanawa II; Rigar-Rijiya I; Rigar-Rijiya II; Tudara Pri. Sch. (Tudara C/Gari)
Bagwai	Gogori	Gajal Pri. Sch. I (Gajal I); Gajal Pri. Sch. II (Gajal II); Galawa Pri. Sch. (Galawa C/Gari I); Galawa C/Gari II; Gogori Dafka I; Gogori Dafka II; Gogori Pri. Sch. I (Gogori C/Gari I); Gogori Pri. Sch. II (Gogori C/Gari II); Gogori Pri. Sch. III (Gogori C/Gari III); Kodo Pri. Sch. I (Kodo I); Kodo Pri. Sch. II (Kodo II); Rigar Gidado I; Rigar-Gidado II; Zango I; Zango II; Zango III
Bagwai	Kwajali	Dakatawa I; Dakatawa II; Jaulare; Kwajali Pri. Sch. I (Kwajali C/Gari I); Kwajali Pri. Sch. II (Kwajali C/Gari II); Rimin Bai Pri. Sch. I (Rimin-Bai C/Gari I); Rimin Bai Pri. Sch. II (Rimin-Bai C/Gari II); Tuga Pri. Sch. I (Tuga C/Gari I); Tuga Pri. Sch. II (Tuga C/Gari II); Tuga Mala I; Tuga Mala II; Tuga Mala III; Yannako
Bagwai	Rimin Dako	Badodo Pri. Sch. I (Badodo C/Gari I); Badodo Pri. Sch. II (Badodo C/Gari II); Bauje Health Center (Bauje); Bauje Pri. Sch. (Baure C/Gari I); Baure C/Gari II; Budel I; Budel II; Gjss Rimin Dako (Rimindako C/Gari I); Rimindako C/Gari II; R/Dako Pri. Sch. II (Rimindako C/Gari III); Ung. Tagwai; Zango Dinya I; Zango Dinya II
Bagwai	Romo	Dawaki; Jarumawa Pri. Sch. (Jarumawa C/Gari); Jibaga; Liringo; Rigar Sodongi; Romo Pri. Sch. I (Romo K/Arewa I); Romo Pri. Sch. II (Romo K/Arewa II); Romo Pri. Sch. III (Romo K/Kudu I); Romo Pri. Sch. IV (Romo K/Kudu II); Market Square I (Tofa Kanawa I); Market Square II (Tofa Kanawa II); W/Ladde Pri. Sch. (Wuroladie); Yar-Tofa Pri. Sch. I (Yartofa C/Gari I); Yar-Tofa Pri. Sch. II (Yartofa C/Gari II)
Bagwai	Sare-Sare	Alajawa Cakas I; Alajawa Cakas II; Aljawa Pri. Sch. Aljawa C/Gari I (Alajawa C/Gari I); Aljawa Pri. Sch. Aljawa C/Gari II (Alajawa C/Gari II); Aljawa Pri. Sch. Aljawa C/Gari III (Alajawa C/Gari III); Badungu I; Badungu II; Sare-Sare Pri. Sch. I (Sare-Sare C/Gari I); Sare-Sare Pri. Sch. II (Sare-Sare C/Gari II); Sare-Sare Pri. Sch. III (Sare-Sare C/Gari III); Surfan/Kare I; Surfan/Kare II; Surfan/Kare III; Surfam Pri. Sch. (Surfam); Umbawa Pri. Sch. I (Umbawa I); Umbawa Pri. Sch. II (Umbawa II)
Bagwai	Wuro Bagga	Badau Pri. Sch. I (Badau C/Gari I); Badau Pri. Sch. II (Badau C/Gari II); Badau Pri. Sch. III (Jama'A I); Badau Pri. Sch. IV (Jama'A II); Liringo Pri. Sch. I (Liringo C/Gari I); Liringo Pri. Sch. II (Liringo C/Gari II); Magani I; Magani II; Majingini C/Gari I; Majingini C/Gari II; Masaurari I; Masaurari II; Rigar Shirgi; Sarkin ?Ya Pri. Sch. I (Sarkinya I); Sarkin ?Ya Pri. Sch. II (Sarkinya II); Saurawa I; Saurawa II; Tamilawa; Tsattawa; Ung. Rimi I; Ung. Rimi II; Wuro Bagga (Wuro Bagga C/Gari I); Wuro Baggap. S. II (Wuro Bagga C/Gari II); Wuro Baggap. S. III (Wuro Bagga C/Gari III)
Bebeji	Anadariya	Anadariya, Cikin Gari I; Anadariya, Cikin Gari II; Tashar Mara I; Tashar Mara II
Bebeji	Baguda	Baguda, C/Gari I; Baguda, C/Gari II; Dukawa; Fandakai; Maidagage; Yakuwa I; Yakuwa II
Bebeji	Bebeji	Bebeji Cikin Gari I; Bebeji Cikin Gari II; Bebeji Cikin Gari III; Bebeji Cikin Gari IV; Galadanchi I; Galadanchi II; Galadanchi III; Galadanchi IV; Jibga Cikin Gari; Jibga Dashi; Jibga Gunki; Jibga Dan Adama; Jibga Yanyakuba; Kwandare; Makama I; Makama II; Makama III; Makama IV; Mataki; Sintili I; Sintili II; Sintili III; Turaki I; Turaki II; Turaki III; Turaki IV; Turaki V
Bebeji	Durmawa	Chezawa I; Danbubu; Dawaki Dogo I; Dawaki Dogo II; Durmawa I; Durmawa II; Garauchi; Kankarimbo; Kariya; Tuggu; Unguwar Kwar; Zango
Bebeji	Gargai	Bagauda; Cikin Gari; Gargai, Cikin Gari I; Gargai, Cikin Gari II; Makera; Ung. Buhari; Katsinawa
Bebeji	Gwarmai	Atumbu; Atumbu Danmako; Dundu; Durmawa Sata I; Gwarmai K/Fada I; Gwarmai K/Fada II; Gwarmai K/Fada III; Gwarmai, Cikin Gari I; Gwarmai, Cikin Gari II; Galadimawa; Galadimawa Islamiyya; Hayin Gwarmai Dindu; Namadiga; Sata I; Sata II; Tarau Barodo; Tarau Hayin
Bebeji	Kofa	Dan Durumi; Durumin Dodo I; Durumin Dodo II; Dandurumi I; Dandurumi II; Kofa Unguwar Wawa; Kofa Cikin Gari I; Kofa Cikin Gari II; Kofa Cikin Gari, Pri. School; Unguwar Wawa; Zango; Zango Islamiyya
Bebeji	Kuki	Ballen Boyi; Ballen Sarki; Kadono; Kargo; Kwanar Malam Tukur; Kuki; Kuki, Cikin Gari; Nasarawa, Kuki I; Nasarawa, Kuki II; Walawa Tubabbu
Bebeji	Ranka	Amawa; Fandabba; Gyatta Aure; Hadiya; Kasuwar Dogo; Katsalle; Maizaure; Nasarawan Kofa; Ranka, Cikin Gari I; Ranka, Cikin Gari II; Rigar Jaura; Rimin Nakuda; Sadawa
Bebeji	Rantan	Agalawa; Rantan Cikin Gari; Sindije; Unguwar Alhaji; Zangere
Bebeji	Tariwa	Chetar; Dutsen Galma; Hayin Kurmi; Tariwa Cikin Gari; Ung. Bawa; Walijan; Yandatsa; Yarkasuwa I; Yarkasuwa II
Bebeji	Wak	Sabon Gari; Wak Cikin Gari; Wak Primary School I; Wak Primary School II; Wak Primary School III
Bichi	Badume	Badume P. S I; Badume P. S II; Bagare/Dugurama; Danfalke; Gauraki Open Space (Gauraki); Kawaji, Sps I; Kawaji, Sps II; Kyauta, C/Gari I; Kyauta, C/Gari II; Sabo Kanawa I; Sabo Kanawa II; Sabo Tsohuwa Health Centre (Sabo Tsohuwa); Sanakur; Tsaure I; Tsaure II; Yakasai I; Yakasai II; Yakasai III; Yalwan Sadi; Yanbundu; Yanleman; Yola I; Yola II; Zage Dantse I; Zage Islamiyya (Zage Dantse II)
Bichi	Bichi	Chiranchi Pri. Sch. (Buden Gari I); Kur'Anic Model Pri. Sch. (Buden Gari II); Buden Waje; Dangawo Islamiya (Dangawo); Dandushe; Dutsen Karya; Faras Islamiyya (Faras); Hagagawa I; Hagagawa II; Agency Formass Edu (Hagagawa III); Hagagawa Model Pri. (Hagagawa IV); Hagagawa Library (Hagagawa V); Hugalawa Kanawa I; Hagagawa Kanawa Islamiya (Hugalawa Kanawa II); Komau; Sabon Gari I; Islamiya Nepa (Sabon Gari II); Towon Hall (Sabon Gari III); Sabaru Yangishiri; G. G. A. J. S. S (Sabo Layi (Tky)); Kanti Pri. Sch. (Sabon Layiyamma I); S/Layi Kanti New Pri. Sch. I (Sabon Layiyamma II); S/Layi Kanti Old Pri. Sch. II (Sabon Layi Kanti I); G. G. A. J. S. S (Sabon Layi Kanti II); Kantin New Pri. Sch. I (Sabon Layi (Tky)); Kantin New Pri. Sch. II (Sabon Layi C/Gari); Tabanni; Islamiya Filin Yarkasuwa I (Zango I); Islamiya Filin Yarkasuwa II (Zango II); G. D. J. S. S. Zango I (Zango III); G. D. J. S. S. Zango II (Zango IV); Zango Karari Pri. Sch. (Zango V)
Bichi	Danzabuwa	Danzabuwa I; Danzabuwa II; Dinsiri Pri. Sch. I (Danya/Mahuta I); Dinsiri Pri. Sch. II (Danya/Mahuta II); Dishi/Yalwa I; G. J. S. S Malikawa Garu (Dishi/Yalwa II); Islamiyya (Jamaar Mashi); Malikawa Garu I; Malikawa Islamiya (Malikawa Guru II); Malikawa Sarari I; Malikawa Sarari II; Nasarawa; D/Zabuwa Pry School I (Rd Fannau I); D/Zabuwa Pry School II (Rd Fannau II); Shami Kawa; Zagin Gari I; Zagin Gari II
Bichi	Fagolo	Fagolo C/Gari I; Walawe (Fagolo C/Gari II); Fatau New Pri. School (Fatau); Hungade New Islamiyya (Hungade I); Hungade II; J/Kadare I; J/Kadare II; J/Tangaji; Kungu I; Kungu II; Tukuibi I; Tukuibi II; Yatsi
Bichi	Kaukau	Damisa; Gadu Islamiyya (Gadu); Girawa Islamiya (Girawa); Huggalawa I; Huggalawa II; Kau-Kau Rimaye; Islamiyya Kau-Kau (Kau-Kau C/Gari I); Kau-Kau C/Gari II; Kadandani Islamiyya I (Kadandani I); Kadandani Islamiyya II (Kadandani II); Islamiyya (Lugge Fulani I); Islamiyya Lugge (Lugge Fulani II); Yandutse
Bichi	Kwamarawa	Chiromawa; Galadimawa; Galaje; J/Mance; Kofar Gidan M/Unguwa (Kozau); Kwamarawa; Kwandawa Fulani I; Kwandawa Fulani II; Kwandawa Fulani III; Marga; Kofar G/Mai Unguwa Dispensary I (Marga Dari I); Kofar G/Mai Unguwa Dispensary II (Marga Dari II); Marke; Maginzawa; Tinki I; Tinki II
Bichi	Kyalli	Bare, Bari; Chiromawa I; Chiromawa II; Chiromawa III; Hagawa; Jigawa; Jamaar Gara; Kyalli C/Gari I; Kyalli C/Gari II; Kozawa; Dispensary Makwaro (Makwaro); Ruddu Islamiya (Ruddu); Saya Saya Pri. Sch. (Saya-Saya); Tsidau Dispensary (Tsidau); Ung. Gajere Under Tree (Ung. Gajere); Yanggwarzo; Zangon Gadu
Bichi	Muntsira	Islamiyya Centre (A'Awa I); New Primary School (A'Awa II); Iyawa Pri. School (Iyawa); Kargon Bichi Sec. Sch I (Kargon Bichi I); Kargon Bichi Sec. Sch II (Kargon Bichi II); Madinai Pri. Sch. (Kargon Bichi III); Muntsira I; Muntsira Ilamiyya (Muntsira II); Sabaru Primary School (Sabaru Muntsira); Sadi Iyawa; Tsaraka Aawa I; Tsaraka Aawa II; Tsaraka A'Awa Clinic (Tsaraka Aawa III)
Bichi	Saye	Bunbur Abukur I; Bunbur Abukur II; Garun Bature Pri. Sch. B I (Dishi I); Garun Bature Pri. Sch. B II (Dishi II); Garun Bature I; Garun Bature II; Saye I; Saye II; Ung. Gabas I; Ung. Gabas II; Yamma Makera Transformer (Yamma Makera I); Yamma Makera Gidan Ruwa (Yamma Makera II); Islamiyya Pri. School (Yamma Makera III)
Bichi	Waire	Opposite Masallachi (Bandutse); Belli I; Belli B Primary School (Belli II); Dutsen Dorawa I; Dutsen Dorawa II; Jinjimawa I; Jinjimawa II; Mallade; Runtimi Under Tree (Runtumi); Waire Pri. School I (Waire, C/Gari I); Waire Pri. School II (Waire, C/Gari II); Zango Kadare Islamiyya I (Zangon Kadare I); Zango Kadere Islamiyya II (Zangon Kadare II)
Bichi	Yallami	Daddo Pri. School (Beguwa); Daddo; Damargu I; Damargu II; Dunawa; Kantakara; Yan Shayi (Santar Rago I); Santar Rago II; Tudun Wada Market Spade (T/Wada); Tsauri I; Tsauri II; Ung. Kofa; Yallami I; Yallami II; Yanlami Market Shade (Yallami III); Yartasha Islamiyya (Yartasha)
Bunkure	Barkum	Barkum, Cikin Gari I; Barkum, Cikin Gari II; Dunkuran Dundu; Dunkuran Kanawa I; Dunkuran Kanawa II; Dunkuran Kanawa III; Luran; Sabon Gari Yamma I; Sabon Gari Yamma II; Unguwar Fawa; Unguwar Nazara
Bunkure	Bunkure	Bunkure Cikin Gari I; Bunkure Cikin Gari II; Bunkure Cikin Gari III; Galadanchi I; Galadanchi II; Galadanchi III; Galadanchi IV; Gunki Cikin Gari I; Gunki Cikin Gari II; Kuruma I; Kuruma II; Mashaura Cikin Gari; Mashaura Sabon Ruwa I; Mashaura Sabon Ruwa II; Unguwar Fawa I; Unguwar Fawa II; Unguwar Madugu I; Unguwar Madugu II; Unguwar Madugu III; Unguwar Madugu IV; Unguwar Madugu V; S. A. S. S. Bunkure -Public Building I (Zangon Baure I); S. A. S. S. Bunkure -Public Building II (Zangon Baure II); S. A. S. S. Bunkure -Public Building III (Zangon Baure III); S. A. S. S. Bunkure- Public Building IV (Zangon Baure IV); S. A. S. S. Bunkure -Public Building V (Zangon Baure V)
Bunkure	Bono	Bono Cikin Gari; Dan Dangana C/Gari I; Dan Dangana C/Gari II; Jiroji Cikin Gari; Jiroji Zango; Lariski; Unguwar Baki I; Unguwar Baki II; Unguwar Karwai; Unguwar Bugaje; Unguwar Zango
Bunkure	Chirin	Barnawa Cikin Gari I; Barnawa Cikin Gari II; Refawa; Chirin Cikin Gari; Dogon Jeji; Gora Cikin Gari; Unguwar Ajuji; Unguwar Kode; Unguwar Sayyadi; Zabi I; Zabi II
Bunkure	Gafan	Bunkau; Gabo Cikin Gari I; Gabo Cikin Gari II; Gafan Cikin Gari; Gafan Makunturi; Kanawa; Shiye Cikin Gari I; Shiye Cikin Gari II; Zanya Cikin Gari I; Zanya Cikin Gari II
Bunkure	Gwamma	Agalawa I; Agalawa II; Gwamma, C/Gari I; Gwamma, C/Gari II; Gwamma, C/Gari III; Gwaneri; Tsambaki; Tugugu; Unguwar Madabo; Unguwar Kudu; Unguwar Kanawa; Unguwar Turba; Yauta
Bunkure	Kulluwa	Badawa Kulluwa I; Badawa Kulluwa II; Tudun Gaji; Falagai I; Falagai II; Jalabi, Cikin Gari; Kulluwa I; Kulluwa II; Ran; Sabo Gida; Satigal, Cikin Gari; Unguwar Isa Gawo; Zango
Bunkure	Kumurya	Batsangaye I; Batsangaye II; Dususu I; Dususu II; Gadama I; Gadama II; Kumurya, Cikin Gari I; Kumurya, Cikin Gari II; Limamai I; Limamai II; Masari I; Masari II; Unguwar Gajere; Unguwar Narki
Bunkure	Sanda	Bakin Kasuwa; Dumari; Dundu, Cikin Gari I; Dundu, Cikin Gari II; Jarnawa; Jigawar Kanawa; Jigawar Sanda; Sanda, Cikin Gari I; Sanda, Cikin Gari II; Sanda Ciwake; Sanda Tusguri; Salliya Masama; Toran Kawa A
Dala	Adakawa	Adakawa, Primary School I; Adakawa, Primary School II; Adakawa, Primary School III; Adakawa, Primary School IV; Adakawa, Primary School V; Ta'Adibul Aulad Girls Sec Sch I (Adakawa, Primary School VI); Ta'Adibul Aulad Girls Sec Sch II (Adakawa, Primary School VII); Ta'Adibul Aulad Girls Sec Sch III (Adakawa, Primary School VIII); Ta'Adibul Aulad Girls Sec Sch IV (Adakawa, Primary School IX); Adakawa Darbejiya I (Adakawa, Primary School X); Adakawa Darbejiya II (Adakawa, Primary School XI); Adakawa Darbejiya III (Adakawa, Primary School XII); Dirimi Daje, O/Space I; Filin Kwakwatawa, O/Space I; Filin Kwakwatawa, O/Space II; Filin Kwakwatawa, O/Space III; Filin Kwakwatawa, O/Space IV; Filin Kwakwatawa, O/Space V; Filin Kwakwatawa, O/Space VI; Filin Limanci Primary School, O/Space I; Filin Limanci Primary School, O/Space II; Filin Limanci, O/Space I; Filin Limanci, O/Space II; Filin Limanci, O/Space III; Garke Limanci, O/Space; K/Gangamau, O/Space I; K/Gangamau, O/Space II; K/Gangamau, O/Space III; Madabo, O/Space I; Madabo, O/Space II; Madabo, O/Space III; Masakar Kuda, O/Space I; Masakar Kuda, O/Space II; Masakar Kuda, O/Space III; Masakar Kuda, O/Space IV; Masakar Kuda, O/Space V
Dala	Bakin Ruwa	Bakin Ruwa, (Filin Audu Ikeja) I; Bakin Ruwa, (Filin Audu Ikeja) II; Bakin Ruwa, (Filin Audu Ikeja) III; Bakin Ruwa, (Filin Audu Ikeja) IV; Bakin Ruwa, (Filin Audu Ikeja) V; Bunawa B/Ruwa, Open Space I; Bunawa B/Ruwa, Open Space II; Bunawa B/Ruwa, Open Space III; Bunawa B/Ruwa, Open Space IV; Danjariri Open, Space; Filin Kurma, Open Space I; Filin Kurma, Open Space II; Filin Masallaci, Open Space; Filin N/Ac, Open Space I; Filin N/Ac, Open Space II; Filin N/Ac, Open Space III; Sheik Atiku Islamiya I (K/G/Unguwa (Chediya), Open Space I); Sheik Atiku Islamiya II (K/G/Unguwa (Chediya), Open Space II); Sheik Atiku Islamiya III (K/G/Unguwa (Chediya), Open Space III); Sheik Atiku Islamiya IV (K/G/Unguwa (Chediya), Open Space IV); Sheik Atiku Islamiya V (K/G/Unguwa (Chediya), Open Space V); Sheik Atiku Islamiya VI (K/G/Unguwa (Chediya), Open Space VI); Mabuga, Open Space I; Mabuga, Open Space II; Mabuga, Open Space III; Nurul Islam, P/Building I; Nurul Islam, P/Building II; Nurul Islam, P/Building III; Yam Balangu, Ayagi; Yar Chedi, Open Space I; Yar Chedi, Open Space II; Yar Chedi, Open Space III; Yar Chedi, F/Itace Open Space; Yar Chedi, Sahatu
Dala	Dala	Filin Mai Itace I, Open Space I; Filin Mai Itace I, Open Space II; Filin Tsula I; Filin Tsula II; Garejin, Alh Ali I; Garejin, Alh Ali II; Garejin Magaji I; Garejin Magaji II; Filin Rijiya Biyu I (K/Gidan Bature I, (R/Biyu) O/S I); Filin Rijiya Biyu II (K/Gidan Bature I, (R/Biyu) O/S II); Bayan Dala Dala Clinic (K/Gidan Bulama, O/Space); Aishatu Islamiyya I (K/Gidan Mai-Unguwar Kabawa I); Aishatu Islamiyya II (K/Gidan Mai-Unguwar Kabawa II); Aishatu Islamiyya III (K/Gidan Mai-Unguwar Kabawa III); Kangiwa Islamiyya I (K/Gidan Mai-Unguwar K/Giwa I); Kangiwa Islamiyya II (K/Gidan Mai-Unguwar K/Giwa II); Kangiwa Islamiyya III (K/Gidan Mai-Unguwar K/Giwa III); Layin Teloli (K/Gidan Mai-Unguwar K/Giwa IV); Tudun Makera I (Gidan Makera I); Tudun Makera II (Gidan Makera II); Tudun Makera III (Gidan Makera III); Filin Rijiya Biyu I (K/Gidan Mai-Unguwar (R/Biyu) I); Filin Rijiya Biyu II (K/Gidan Mai-Unguwar (R/Biyu) II); Nafahatu Islamiyya, Sch. I P/Build I; Nafahatu Islamiyya, Sch. I P/Build II; Nafahatu Islamiyya, Sch. I P/Build III; Shatshari (Karofi) O/Space I; Shatshari (Karofi) O/Space II; Shatshari (Karofi) O/Space III
Dala	Dogon Nama	Dogo Nama, (Open Space) I; Dogo Nama ,(Open Space) II; Goron Dutse, P/Building I; Goron Dutse, P/Building II; Goron Dutse, P/Building III; Goron Dutse, P/Building IV; Mai Adua, O/Space I; Mai Adua, O/Space II; Mai Adua, O/Space III; Mai Adua, O/Space IV; Mai Adua, O/Space V; Mai Adua, O/Space VI; Rijiya Hudu, Open Space I; Rijiya Hudu, Open Space II; Rijiya Hudu, Open Space III; Rijiya Hudu, Open Space IV; Rijiya Hudu, Open Space V; Rijiya Hudu, Open Space VI; Rijiya Hudu, Open Space VII; Rijiya Hudu, Open Space VIII; Rijiya Hudu, Open Space IX; Rijiya Hudu, Open Space X
Dala	Gobirawa	Area Court, P/Building I; Area Court, P/Building II; Area Court, P/Building III; Area Court, P/Building IV; Area Court, P/Building V; Area Court, P/Building VI; Area Court, P/Building VII; Dorawar Mai Gemu, Open Space I; Dorawar Mai Gemu, Open Space II; Dorawar Mai Gemu, Open Space III; Dorawar Mai Gemu, Open Space IV; Dorawar Mai Gemu, Open Space V; Dorawar Mai Gemu, Open Space VI; Dukawar (Gobirawa), Open Space I; Dukawa (Gobirawa), Open Space II; Rijiya Hudu, Open Space IV; Rijiya Hudu, Open Space V; Rijiya Hudu, Open Space VI; Filin Durumi, P/Building II; Filin Durumi, P/Building III; Filin Durumi, P/Building IV; Filin Durumi, P/Building V; Filin Durimi, P/Building VI; Filin Durimi, P/Building VII; Filin Durimi, P/Building VIII; Filin Durimi, P/Building IX; Filin Durimi, P/Building X; Filin Durimi, P/Building XI; Filin Durimi, P/Building XII; Filin Durimi, P/Building XIII; Filin Durimi, P/Building XIV; Filin Durimi, P/Building XV; Filin Durimi, P/Building XVI; Filin Durimi, P/Building XVII; Filin Durimi, P/Building XVIII; Filin Kara, Open Space I; Filin Kara, Open Space II; Filin Kara, Open Space III; Filin Kara, Open Space IV; Filin Kara, Open Space V; Filin Kara, Open Space VI; Filin Kara, Open Space VII; Filin Naira Da Kobo, Open Space I; Filin Naira Da Kobo, Open Space II; Filin Naira Da Kobo, Open Space III; Filin Naira Da Kobo, Open Space IV; Filin Naira Da Kobo, Open Space V; Filin Naira Da Kobo, Open Space VI; Filin Naira Da Kobo, Open Space VII; Filin Naira Da Kobo, Open Space VIII; Tudun Bojuwa, Open Space I; Tudun Bojuwa, Open Space II; Tudun Bojuwa, Open Space III; Tudun Bojuwa, Open Space IV; Tsamiyar Zubau, Open Space I; Tsamiyar Zubau, Open Space II; Tsamiyar Zubau, Open Space III; Tsamiyar Zubau, Open Space IV; Yammata S. P School, P/Building I; Yammata S. P School, P/Building II; Yammata S. P School, P/Building III; Yammata S. P School, P/Building IV; Yammata S. P School, P/Building V; Yammata S. P School, P/Building VI; Yammata S. P School, P/Building VII; Yammata S. P School, P/Building VIII; Yammata S. P School, P/Building IX; Yammata S. P School, P/Building X; Yammata S. P School, P/Building XI; Yammata Sp School, P/Building I; Yammata Sp School, P/Building II; Yammata Sp School, P/Building III; Yammata Sp School, P/Building IV; Yammata Sp School, P/Building V
Dala	Gwammaja	Dala S. P. S (Dala), P/Buil I; Dala S. P. S (Dala), P/Buil II; Dala S. P. S (Dala), P/Buil III; Dala S. P. S (Dala), P/Buil IV; Layin Bukar Makoda Mallam Mammado Islamiyya I I (Dala S. P. S (Dala), P/Buil V); Layin Bukar Makoda Mallam Mammado Islamiyya II II (Dala S. P. S (Dala), P/Buil VI); Layin Bukar Makoda Mallam Mammado Islamiyya III III (Dala S. P. S (Dala), P/Buil VII); G. S. S. Dala(Dala), P/Build I; G. S. S. Dala,(Dala) P/Build II; G. S. S. Dala,(Dala) P/Build III; G. S. S. Dala,(Dala) P/Build IV; G. S. S. Dala,(Dala) P/Build V; G. S. S. Dala,(Dala) P/Build VI; G. S. S. Dala,(Dala) P/Build VII; Layin Uba Gaya Gwammaja Clinic I (G. S. S. Dala,(Dala) P/Build VIII); Layin Uba Gaya Gwammaja Clinic II (G. S. S. Dala,(Dala) P/Build IX); Layin Uba Gaya Gwammaja Clinic III (G. S. S. Dala,(Dala) P/Build X); Layin Uba Gaya Gwammaja Clinic IV (G. S. S. Dala, (Dala) P/Build XI); Layin Uba Gaya Gwammaja Clinic V (G. S. S. Dala,(Dala) P/Build XII); G. S. S. Gwamaja, (Gwamaja Build) I; G. S. S. Gwamaja, (Gwamaja Build) II; G. S. S. Gwamaja, (Gwamaja Build) III; G. S. S. Gwamaja, (Gwamaja Build) IV; G. S. S. Gwamaja, (Gwamaja Build) V; G. S. S. Gwamaja, (Gwamaja Build) VI; G. S. S. Gwamaja, (Gwamaja Build) VII; G. S. S. Gwamaja, (Gwamaja Build) VIII; G. S. S. Gwamaja, (Gwamaja Build) IX; G. S. S. Gwamaja, (Gwamaja Build) X; Jambulo Gwammaja Model Pri. Sch. I (G. S. S. Gwamaja, (Gwamaja Build) XI); Jambulo Gwammaja Model Pri. Sch. II (G. S. S. Gwamaja, (Gwamaja Build) XII); Jambulo Gwammaja Model Pri. Sch. III (G. S. S. Gwamaja, (Gwamaja Build) XIII); Jambulo Gwammaja Model Pri. Sch. IV (G. S. S. Gwamaja, (Gwamaja Build) XIV); Jambulo Gwammaja Model Pri. Sch. V (G. S. S. Gwamaja, (Gwamaja Build) XV); Gwamaja S. P. S. ,(Gwamaja) P/Build I; Gwamaja S. P. S., (Gwamaja) P/Build II; Gwamaja S. P. S., (Gwamaja) P/Build III; Gwamaja S. P. S. (Gwamaja) P/Build IV; Gwamaja S. P. S. ,(Gwamaja) P/Build V; Gwamaja S. P. S., (Gwamaja) P/Build VI; Gwamaja S. P. S., (Gwamaja) P/Build VII; Gwamaja S. P. S., (Gwamaja) P/Build VIII; Gwamaja S. P. S., (Gwamaja) P/Build IX; Gwamaja S. P. S., (Gwamaja) P/Build X; Layin Abdulsalami Maitaya Ilimul Kur'An Islamic Jun. Sec Sch I (Gwamaja S. P. S., (Gwamaja) P/Build XI; Layin Abdulsalami Maitaya Ilimul Kur'An Islamic Jun. Sec Sch II (Gwamaja S. P. S., (Gwamaja) P/Build X; Layin Abdulsalami Maitaya Ilimul Kur'An Islamic Jun. Sec Sch III (Gwamaja S. P. S., (Gwamaja) P/Build; Layin Abdulsalami Maitaya Ilimul Kur'An Islamic Jun. Sec Sch IV (Gwamaja S. P. S., (Gwamaja) P/Build X; Layin Abdulsalami Maitaya Ilimul Kur'An Islamic Jun. Sec Sch V (Gwamaja S. P. S, (Gwamaja) P/Build XV); Tij. Usman, Islamiyya P/Build I; Tij. Usman, Islamiyya P/Build II; Tij. Usman, Islamiyya P/Build III; Tij. Usman, Islamiyya P/Build IV; Tij. Usman, Islamiyya P/Build V; Tij. Usman, Islamiyya P/Build VI; Tij. Usman, Islamiyya P/Build VII; Tij. Usman, Islamiyya P/Build VIII; Tij. Usman, Islamiyya P/Build IX; Tijani Usman, Islamiyya P/Build I; Layin Bakori Pilot Model Pri. Sch. I (Tijani Usman, Islamiyya P/Build II); Layin Bakori Pilot Model Pri. Sch. II (Tijani Usman, Islamiyya P/Build III); Layin Bakori Pilot Model Pri. Sch. III (Tijani Usman, Islamiyya P/Build IV); Layin Bakori Pilot Model Pri. Sch. IV (Tijani Usman, Islamiyya P/Build V); Layin Bakori Pilot Model Pri. Sch. V (Tijani Usman, Islamiyya P/Build VI)
Dala	Kabuwaya	Dala G. S. P. S (Girls)- (Makafin Dala) P/Build I; Dala G. S. P. S (Girls)- (Makafin Dala) P/Build II; Dala G. S. P. S (Girls) (Makafin Dala) P/Build III; Dala G. S. P. S (Girls) -(Makafin Dala) P/Build IV; Dala G. S. P. S (Girls) -(Makafin Dala) P/Build V; Dala G. S. P. S (Girls) -(Makafin Dala) P/Build VI; Dala G. S. P. S (Girls) -(Makafin Dala) P/Build VII; Dala G. S. P. S (Girls) -(Makafin Dala) P/Build VIII; Dala G. S. P. S (Girls) -(Makafin Dala) P/Build IX; Dala G. S. P. S (Girls) -(Makafin Dala) P/Build X; Dala G. S. P. S (Girls) -(Makafin Dala) P/Build XI; Dala G. S. P. S (Girls) -(Makafin Dala) P/Build XII; Dala G. S. P. S (Girls) -(Makafin Dala) P/Build XIII; Dala G. S. P. S (Girls)-(Makafin Dala) P/Build XIV; Dala G. S. P. S (Girls) -(Makafin Dala) P/Build XV; Kabuwaya Filin Kabuwaya I (Kofar Gidan Mai Unguwar (Kabuwaya) O/Space I); Kabuwaya Filin Kabuwaya II (Kofar Gidan Mai Unguwa, (Kabuwaya) O/Space II); Kabuwaya Filin Kabuwaya III (Kofar Gidan Mai Unguwa, (Kabuwaya) O/Space III); Kabuwaya Filin Kabuwaya IV (Kofar Gidan Mai Unguwa, (Kabuwaya) O/Space IV); Shirawa M. M Islamiya Shirawa I (Kofar Gidan Mai Unguwa, (Shirawa) O/Space I); Shirawa M. M Islamiya Shirawa II (Kofar Gidan Mai Unguwar, Shirawa) O/Space II); Shirawa M. M Islamiya Shirawa III (Kofar Gidan Mai Unguwar,(Shirawa) O/Space III); Shirawa M. M Islamiya Shirawa IV (Kofar Gidan Mai Unguwar,(Shirawa) O/Space IV); Shirawa M. M Islamiya Shirawa V (Kofar Gidan Mai Unguwar,(Shirawa) O/Space V); Shirawa M. M Islamiya Shirawa VI (Kofar Gidan Mai Unguwar,(Shirawa) O/Space VI); Shirawa M. M Islamiya Shirawa VII (Kofar Gidan Mai Unguwar,(Shirawa) O/Space VII); Shirawa M. M Islamiya Shirawa VIII (Kofar Gidan Mai Unguwar,(Shirawa) O/Space VIII); Loko Malam Alala- O/Space I; Loko Malam Alala ,(Shirawa) O/Space II; Lokon Amina Mai Funkaso, (Shirawa) O/Space I; Lokon Amina Mai Funkaso, (Shirawa) O/Space II
Dala	Kantudu	Bajinjire, (Kantudu) O/Space I; Bajinjire, (Kantudu) O/Space II; Filin M. Nura, (Kantudu) O/Space I; Filin M. Nura ,(Kantudu) O/Space II; Filin M. Nura, (Kantudu) O/Space III; Filin M. Nura, (Kantudu) O/Space IV; Filin M. Nura ,(Kantudu) O/Space V; Gadar Salga, (Juma) O/Space I; Gadar Salga, (Juma) O/Space II; Gadar Salga, (Juma) O/Space III; Gadar Salga, (Juma) O/Space IV; Gadar Salga, (Juma) O/Space V; Gadar Salga, (Juma) O/Space VI; Gadar Salga, (Juma) O/Space VII; Dandali Dandalin Turawa I (Kofar Gidan Mai Unguwa ,(Dandali) O/Space I); Dandali Dandalin Turawa II (Kofar Gidan Mai Unguwa, (Dandali) O/Space II); Kantudu Layin Na Goma (Kofar Gidan Nagoma M., (Kantundu) O/Space); Yan Katifa Layin Kankare Kantudu I (Kofar Gidan S/America, (Kantudu) O/Space I); Yan Katifa Layin Kankare Kantudu II (Kofar Gidan S/America, Kantudu) O/Space II); Yan Katifa Layin Kankare Kantudu III (Kofar Gidan S/America, (Kantudu) O/Space III); Yan Katifa Layin Kankare Kantudu IV (Kofar Gidan S/America, (Kantudu) O/Space IV); L/Sa'A Mai Koko, (Katundu) O/Space I; L/Sa'A Mai Koko ,(Katundu) O/Space II; L/Sa'A Mai Koko, (Katundu) O/Space III; L/Sa'A Mai Koko, (Katundu) O/Space IV; Makwalla I (Ofishin Wakilin Arewa, (Makwalla) P/Build I); Makwalla II (Ofishin Wakilin, Arewa (Makwalla) P/Build II); Makwalla III (Ofishin Wakilin Arewa, (Makwalla) P/Build III); Makwalla IV (Ofishin Wakilin Arewa (Makwalla) Open Space IV); Makwalla V (Ofshin Arewa, (Makwalla) Open Space V)
Dala	Kofar Mazugal	Filin Arzai/(Arzai) O/Space I; Filin Arzai/(Arzai) O/Space II; Filin Arzai/(Arzai) O/Space III; Filin Arzai/(Arzai) O/Space IV; Gwani Nadudu Primary (Filin Daurawa/ (Daurawa) Open Space I); Filin Daurawa/ (Daurawa) Open Space II; Filin Daurawa/ (Daurawa) Open Spaceiii; Filin Daurawa /(Daurawa) Open Space IV; Filin Daurawa/ (Daurawa) Open Space V; Filin Daurawa/ (Daurawa) Open Space VI; Tahfizul Qur, An Kirfi (Filin Daurawa /(Daurawa) Open Space VII); Garbati Islamiyya (Filin Sarari /(Sarari) O/Space I); Filin Sarari /(Sarari) O/Space II; Filin Sarari /(Sarari) O/Space III; Filin Sarari/(Sarari) O/Space IV; Filin Sarari /(Sarari) O/Space V; Sheikh Nagoggo Islamiyya (Filin Sarari/Sarari O/Space VI); Sarari Community School (Filin Sarari/Sarari O/Space VII); Kofar Mazugal Layin Gidan Boss I (Kofar Gidan Umaru Mai Tifa (K/ Mazugal) O/Space I); Kofar Mazugal Layin Gidan Boss II (Kofar Gidan Umaru Mai Tifa (K/ Mazugal) O/Space II); Layin A. Mai Goba/ (K/Mazugal) O/Space I; Layin A. Mai Goba/ (K/Mazugal) O/Space II; Layin A. Mai Goba/ (K/Mazugal) O/Space III; Layin A. Mai Goba /(K/Mazugal) O/Space IV; Layin A. Mai Goba/ (K/Mazugal) O/Space V; L/M/N/Duwala /(K/Kamazugal) O/Space I; L/M/N/Duwala/ (K/Kamazugal) O/Space II; Layin Ummaru Zarto (L/M/N/Duwala/ (K/Kamazugal) O/Space III); L/M/N/Duwala/ (K/Kamazugal) O/Space IV; L/M/N/Duwala/ (K/Kamazugal) O/Space V; L/M/N/Duwala/ (K/Kamazugal) O/Space VI; L/M/N/Duwala/ (K/Kamazugal) O/Space VII; Sani Mai Unguwa Model Pri. Sch. I (Masaka S. P. S/ (K/Mazugal) P/Build I); Sani Mai Unguwa Model Pri. Sch. II (Masaka S. P. S/ (K/Mazugal) P/Build II); Sani Mai Unguwa Model Pri. Sch. III (Masaka S. P. S /(K/Mazugal) P/Build III); Sani Mai Unguwa Model Pri. Sch. IV (Masaka S. P. S/ (K/Mazugal) P/Build IV); Sani Mai Unguwa Model Pri. Sch. V (Masaka S. P. S /(K/Mazugal) P/Build V); Ggss Kofar Mazugal I (Masaka S. P. S /(K/Mazugal) P/Build VI); Ggss Kofar Mazugal II (Masaka S. P. S/ (K/Mazugal) P/Build VII); Ggss Kofar Mazugal III (Masaka S. P./ (K/Mazugal) P/Build VIII); Ggss Kofar Mazugal IV (Masaka S. P. S/ (K/Mazugal) P/Build IX); Ggss Kofar Mazugal V (Masaka S. P. S /(K/Mazugal) P/Build X); Masaka S. P. S/ (K/Mazugal) P/Build XI; Masaka S. P. S /(K/Mazugal) P/Build XII; Masaka S. P. S/ (K/Mazugal) P/Build XIII; Ujilen Goro I (Masaka S. P. S /(K/Mazugal) P/Build XIV); Ujilen Goro II (Masaka S. P. S/ (K/Mazugal) P/Build XV); Maisikeli Health Clinic I (Masaka S. P. S/ (K/Mazugal) P/Build XVI); Maisikeli Health Clinic II (Masaka S. P. S/ (K/Mazugal) P/Build XVII); Masaka S. P. S /(K/Mazugal) P/Build XVIII; Masaka S. P. S/ (K/Mazugal) P/Build XIX
Dala	Kofar Ruwa	Audu Dambatta G. S. S.- (K/Ruwa B) P/Build I; Audu Dambatta G. S. S.- (K/Ruwa B) P/Build II; Audu Dambatta G. S. S.- (K/Ruwa B) P/Build III; Audu Dambatta G. S. S. -(K/Ruwa B) P/Build IV; Audu Dambatta G. S. S.- (K/Ruwa B) P/Build V; K/Ruwa Filin Yangaruwa L/Hula I (Kofar Gidan A. Hula I); K/Ruwa Filin Yangaruwa L/Hula II (Kofar Gidan A. Hula II); Dandinshe A A. C. Islamiyya I (Kofar Gidan Mai Unguwar /(Dandinshe I) O/Space A); Dandinshe A A. C. Islamiyya II (Kofar Gidan Mai Unguwar/ (Dandinshe II) O/Space A); Dandinshe A A. C. Islamiyya III (Kofar Gidan Mai Unguwar/ (Dandinshe III) O/Space A); Dandinshe A A. C. Islamiyya IV (Kofar Gidan Mai Unguwar/ (Dandinshe IV) O/Space A); Dandinshe B S. P. S Dandinshe I (Kofar Gidan Mai Unguwar/ (Dandinshe I) O/Space B); Dandinshe B S. P. S Dandinshe II (Kofar Gidan Mai Unguwar/ (Dandinshe II) O/Space B); K/Dawanu K/Dawanau Islamiyya I (Kofar Gidan Mai Unguwar/ (K/D/Mau) O/Space I); K/Dawanu K/Dawanau Islamiyya II (Kofar Gidan Mai Unguwar/ (K/D/Mau) O/Space II); K/Dawanu K/Dawanau Islamiyya III (Kofar Gidan Mai Unguwar/ (K/D/Mau) O/Space III); K/Ruwa Ainuddini Islamiyya I (Kofar Gidan S/Kofa /(K/Ruwa) O/Space I); K/Ruwa Ainuddini Islamiyya II (Kofar Gidan S/Kofa /(K/Ruwa) O/Space II); K/Ruwa Ainuddini Islamiyya III (Kofar Gidan S/Kofa/ (K/Ruwa) O/Space III); K/Ruwa Ainuddini Islamiyya IV (Kofar Gidan S/Kofa /(K/Ruwa) O/Space IV); K/Ruwa Ainuddini Islamiyya V (Kofar Gidan S/Kofa/ (K/Ruwa) O/Space V); K/Ruwa Filin Gidan Gawo I (Kofar Gidan T/Abdu /(K/Ruwa) O/Space I); K/Ruwa Filin Gidan Gawo II (Kofar Gidan T/Abdu/ (K/Ruwa) O/Space II); K/Ruwa Filin Gidan Gawo III (Kofar Gidan T/Abdu (K/Ruwa) /O/Space III); K/Ruwa Filin Gidan Gawo IV (Kofar Gidan T/Abdu (K/Ruwa) /O/Space IV); Kofar Ruwa S. P. S /(K/Ruwa A) P/Build I; Kofar Ruwa S. P. S /(K/Ruwa A) P/Build II; Kofar Ruwa S. P. S /(K/Ruwa A) P/Build III; Kofar Ruwa S. P. S/ (K/Ruwa A) P/Build IV; Filin Naira Da Kobo/(K/Ruwa B) O/Space I; Filin Naira Da Kobo/ (K/Ruwa B) O/Space II; Filin Naira Da Kobo/ (K/Ruwa B) O/Space III; Filin Naira Da Kobo/ (K/Ruwa B) O/Space IV
Dala	Madigawa	Filin Isyaku Kale-Kale /(Mararraba) O/Space I; Filin Isyaku Kale-Kale/ (Mararraba) O/Space II; Filin Isyaku Kale-Kale /(Mararraba) O/Space III; Filin Isyaku Kale-Kale /(Mararraba) O/Space IV; Filin Isyaku Kale-Kale/ (Mararraba) O/Space V; Filin Isyaku Kale-Kale/ (Mararraba) O/Space VI; Kangon Jakai/ (Yar Kasuwa) O/Space I; Kangon Jakai /(Yar Kasuwa) O/Space II; Kangon Jakai /(Yar Kasuwa) O/Space III; Kangon Jakai/ (Yar Kasuwa) O/Space IV; Kangon Jakai/ (Yar Kasuwa) O/Space V; Kangon Jakai/ (Yar Kasuwa) O/Space VI; Kangon Jakai /(Yar Kasuwa) O/Space VII; Kangon Jakai/(Yar Kasuwa) O/Space VIII; Mararraba Filin Mararraba I (Kafar Gidan Mai Unguwar- (Mararraba) O/Space I); Mararraba Filin Mararraba II (Kafar Gidan Mai Unguwar- (Mararraba) O/Space II); Mararraba Filin Mararraba III (Kafar Gidan Mai Unguwar- (Mararraba) O/Space III); Mararraba Filin Mararraba IV (Kafar Gidan Mai Unguwar- (Mararraba) O/Space IV); Mararraba Filin Mararraba V (Kafar Gidan Mai Unguwar -(Mararraba) O/Space V); Mararraba Filin Mararraba VI (Kafar Gidan Mai Unguwar /(Mararraba) O/Space VI); Magoga Filin Magoga I (Kofar Gidan Mai Unguwar/ (Magoga) O/Space I); Magoga Filin Magoga II (Kofar Gidan Mai Unguwar/ (Magoga) O/Space II); Magoga Filin Magoga III (Kofar Gidan Mai Unguwar/ (Magoga) O/Space III); Kofar Gidan S/Kanga /O/Space I; Kofar Gidan S/Kanga/ O/Space II; Kofar Gidan S/Kanga/ O/Space III; Kofar Gidan S/Kanga /O/Space IV; Kofar Gidan S/Kanga /O/Space V; Kofar Gidan S/Kanga/ O/Space VI; Kofar Gidan S/Kanga/ O/Space VII; Kofar Gidan S/Kanga/ O/Space VIII; Kofar Gidan S/Kanga /O/Space IX; Kofar Gidan Umar D/Tofi/ O/Space I; Kofar Gidan Umar D/Tofi/ O/Space II; Kofar Gidan Umar D/Tofi /O/Space III; Kofar Gidan Umar D/Tofi /O/Space IV; Kofar Gidan Umar D/Tofi /O/Space V; Kuka Bulukiya/ Pri. School P/Build I; Kuka Bulukiya /Pri. School P/Build II; Kuka Bulukiya Pri. School, P/Build III; Kuka Bulukiya Pri. School, P/Build IV; Kuka Bulukiya Pri. School, P/Build V; Kuka Bulukiya Pri. School, P/Build VI; Kuka Bulukiya Pri. School, P/Build VII; Kuka Bulukiya Pri. School, P/Build VIII; Kuka Bulukiya Pri. School, P/Build IX
Dala	Yalwa	Anwarul Islam, (Yelwa) P/Build I; Anwarul Islam ,(Yelwa) P/Build II; Anwarul Islam, (Yelwa) P/Build III; Anwarul Islam, (Yelwa) P/Build IV; Anwarul Islam, (Yelwa) P/Build V; Anwarul Islam ,(Yelwa) P/Build VI; Anwarul Islam, (Yelwa) P/Build VII; Anwarul Islam, (Yelwa) P/Build VIII; Anwarul Islam, (Yelwa) P/Build IX; Anwarul Islam, (Yelwa) P/Build X; Fanteka Islam, (Fanteka) O/Space I; Fanteka Islam, (Fanteka) O/Space II; Yalwa Model Spec. Prim. Sch I (Kofar Gidan Ibrahim Balarebe, (Yelwa) O/Space I); Yalwa Model Spec. Prim. Sch II (Kofar Godan Ibrahim Balarebe/O/Space II); Yalwa Model Spec. Prim. Sch III (Kofar Gidan Ibrahim Balarebe/ O/Space III); Kofar Gidan Ibrahim Balarebe/ O/Space IV; Kofar Gidan Ibrahim Balarebe/ O/Space V; Kofar Gidan Ibrahim Balarebe/ O/Space VI; Kofar Gidan Ibrahim Balarebe/ O/Space VII; Yalwa Model Spec. Prim. Sch IV (Kofar Gidan Mai Agogo, O/Space I); Yalwa Model Spec. Prim. Sch V (Kofar Gidan Mai Agogo, O/Space II); Yalwa Model Spec. Prim. Sch VI (Kofar Gidan Mai Agogo, O/Space III); Kofar Gidan M. (Sanka), O/Space I; Kofar Gidan M. (Sanka), O/Space II; Kofar Gidan M. (Sanka), O/Space III; Kofar Gidan M. (Sanka), O/Space IV; Kofar Gidan M. (Sanka), O/Space V; Kofar Gidan M. (Sanka), O/Space VI; Fanteka Abajul Islam Fanteka I (Kofar Gidan Mai Unguwar Sabuwar G/Dutse/ O/Space I); Fanteka Abajul Islam Fanteka II (Kofar Gidan Mai Unguwar Sabuwarg/Dutse/ O/Space II); Fanteka Abajul Islam Fanteka III (Kofar Gidan Mai Unguwar Sabuwa G/Dutse/ O/Space III); Fanteka Abajul Islam Fanteka IV (Kofar Gidan Mai Unguwar Sabuwa G/Dutse/ O/Space IV); Fanteka Abajul Islam Fanteka V (Kofar Gidan Mai Unguwar Sabuwa G/Dutse/ O/Space V); Fanteka Abajul Islam Fanteka VI (Kofar Gidan Rabiu Musa G/Dutse/ O/Space); Rimin Madaki Musa G/Dutse/ O/Space; Yalwa S. P. S. (Yalwa) G/Dutse/ P/Build I; Yalwa S. P. S. (Yalwa) G/Dutse/ P/Build II; Yalwa S. P. S. (Yalwa) G/Dutse/ P/Build III; Yalwa S. P. S. (Yalwa) G/Dutse /P/Build IV; Yalwa S. P. S. (Yalwa) G/Dutse / P/Build V; Yalwa S. P. S. (Yalwa) G/Dutse/ P/Build VI; Yalwa S. P. S. (Yalwa) G/Dutse/ P/Build VII; Yalwa S. P. S. (Yalwa) G/Dutse/ P/Build VIII; Yalwa S. P. S. (Yalwa) G/Dutse/ P/Build IX; Yalwa S. P. S. (Yalwa) G/Dutse/ P/Build X; Yalwa S. P. S. (Yalwa) G/Dutse/ P/Build XI; Yalwa S. P. S. (Yalwa) G/Dutse/ P/Build XII; Yalwa S. P. S. (Yalwa) G/Dutse/ P/Build XIII; Yalwa S. P. S. (Yalwa) G/Dutse/ P/Build XIV; Yalwa S. P. S. (Yalwa) G/Dutse / P/Build XV; Yalwa S. P. S. (Yalwa) G/Dutse/ P/Build XVI; Yalwa S. P. S. (Yalwa) G/Dutse/ P/Build XVII; Yalwa S. P. S. (Yalwa) G/Dutse/ P/Build XVIII
Danbata	Ajumawa	Ajumawa, Primary School; Babbaka, Open Space; Danyagari Primary School; Daurawa, Primary School; Dogarafi, Open Space; Ganji, Open Space; Makera, Open Space; Masallachi, Open Space; Marken Danya, Open Space; Tsamiya, Open Space; Tsallewa, Open Space; Unguwar Juli, Open Space; Wanzamai, Open Space; Yammawa Primary School
Danbata	Danbatta East	Bakin Tasha, Open Space; Barde, Primary School; Bengel, Open Space; Birnin Kara-Primary School; Danmako, Open Space; Daurawa, Open Space; Islamiya Primary School; K/Arewa, Primary School I; K/Arewa, Primary School II; K/Kudu, Primary School I; K/Kudu, Primary School II; K/Yamma, Open Space I; Matsiga, Open Space; Riniyal, Open Space; T/Wada, Primary School I; T/Wada, Primary School II; T/Danyaro, Open Space I; T/Gwanda, Open Space
Danbata	Danbatta West	Alfigir, Open Space; B/Asibiti, Open Space; Fagwalo, Primary School; G/B. A. K., Open Space; Gra, Open Space; Kauyen Mudu, Open Space; K/Lalai, Open Space; K/Maiunguwa, Open Space; Nasarawa, Open Space; Kanti Primary School; G. G. A. S. S. Danbata; Tukura, Open Space; U. Heru, Open Space
Danbata	Fagwalawa	Borodo, Primary School; Dama, Open Space; Dama Katsar Duwa, Open Space; Fagwalawa Dashi, Primary School; Fagwalawa Gari, Primary School; Gasadoce, Primary School; Jama'A, Primary School; Katsarduwa, Primary School; Malikawa Garu, Open Space; Makera, Primary School; Sakiya, Open Space; Sunbuna, Open Space; Tona, Primary Space; Tsameku, Primary School; Tirzau, Open Space; Zadawa, Open Space
Danbata	Goron Maje	Baro, Open Space; Daki Tara, Open Space; Fayen-Fayen, Public Building; Gangara, Open Space; Gaude, Open Space; Goron Maje, Primary School; Jimada, Open Space; Jimadafayen-Fayen, Open Space; More, Open Space; Sankarawa, Primary School; Tasawar Kanawa, Open Space; Unguwar Ali, Primary School; Zago Gari, Primary
Danbata	Gwanda	Amachoko, Open Space; Chasko, Primary School; Diggol, Primary School; Dogarya, Open Space; Dukawa Gari, Primary School; Gwanda Gari, Public Building; Katsere, Open Space; Katsiro, Open Space; Tasawa, Open Space; Tukurun Kanawa; Tuffol, Open Spoace; Unguwar Biyu, Open Space
Danbata	Gwarabjawa	Balloda, Primary School; Baushe, Primary School; Gwalada Gari, Primary School; Gwarabjawa, Primary School; Jaf Tawa, Open Space; Mai Ganjin Danbatta, Primary School; Maraki, Open Space; Maigaujin Mahuta, Primary School; Saidawa, Open Space; Shiddar Primary School; Tagwaye, Open Space; Tsaraka, Primary School; Tuffol, Primary School; Unguwarwaje, Open Space; Unguwar Yusuf, Open Space; Unguwar Ruga, Open Space; Yanyayi, Primary School
Danbata	Saidawa	Birji -Open Space; Dugudu -Open Space; Gandu, Open Space; Geza, Primary School; Koya, Pri. School; Mahuta, Pri. School; Marke, Pri. School; Mungawa, Open Space; Ruwan Kuka, Open Space; Saidawa, Primary School; Takai, Primary School; Tsallewa, Open Space; Zakirai, Primary School
Danbata	Sansan	Chiroma, Open Space; Dungu, Open Space; Dungurmi, Pri. Sch.; Gangaradungurmi, Open Space; Gangare, Open Space; Gandu, Open Space; Kanwaye, Open Space; Kwashuri, Pri. Sch.; Maifaru, Open Space; Sansan, Primary School; Tsallewa, Open Space; U/Mamman, Open Space; U/Sha'Aibu, Open Space
Dawaki Kudu	Dabar Kwari	Balbelu Ps I; Balbelu Ps II; Balbelu Ps III; Balbelu Vill.; Baradai Ps.; Doga; Fan Ido/Abuja; Fan Ido G/Ganda; Fan Ido Ps. Ab I; Fan Ido Ps. Ab II; Fan Ido C/Gari; Gandun Marmara A/B; Hawan Dawaki A/B; Marmara I; Marmara II; Wakai Rinja; Wakai Ps; Wakai Zango; Wakai Luran
Dawaki Kudu	Danbagiwa	Dangwaya D. Village; Danidris, Pri. Sch.; Dukawa, Pri. Sch. I; Dukawa, Pri. Sch. II; Gindin, Rimi; Gujiyar, Ruwa I; Gujiyar, Ruwa II; Jigawa, Ado Village; Luna Yanbukar I; Luna Yanbukar II; Police Academy; S. Garinku; Unguwar Gara I; Unguwar Gara II
Dawaki Kudu	Dawakiji	Dawakiji Ps A/B I; Dawakiji Ps A/B II; Dawakiji Ps; Gawo; Kantsi Ps; Kantsi P/S A/B; (Kode) Ps; Kyarmawa; Lavnawa Kode; Motor Park A/B I; Motor Park A/B II; Old Market; Sefawa Jajaye; Wangara Y/Dusa; Zabuwa
Dawaki Kudu	Dosan	Baidawa; Basaima; Damfara; Datsa; Dosan I; Dosan II; Fanci Tudu; Fanci Kwari I; Fanci Kwari II; Gargari; Kama Gata; Kogar Babba; Kudi; Shadai; Shadai Garin Kaya; Shari Fawa
Dawaki Kudu	Gano	Dispensary A/B I; Dispensary A/B II; Duman Rafi; Fallau Asayaya; Fallau A/B; Gano Cent. Ps A/B I; Gano Cent. Ps A/B II; Gano Cent., Ps A/B III; Gano Cent., Ps A/B IV; Gano II, Ps A/B I; Gano II, Ps A/B II; Kunkurawa I; Kunkurawa II; Tsaniya A/B I (Tsamiya); Tsaniya A/B II (Tsamiya); Tsaniya (Tsamiya); Yantakarda
Dawaki Kudu	Jido	D/Naabba A/B; Dokawa; Jido Islamiya A/B; S/Gari Jido; S/Jido A/B; Tambutu I; Tambutu II
Dawaki Kudu	Tamburawa	Dantube Tessa I; Dantube Tessa II Ps; G/Cinima A/B; G/Gwargi; G/Gwargi A/B; Gandun, Sarki A/B I; Gandun, Sarki A/B II; Hausawa, H. Vil.; Kowa Da Nasa Ab; K/Kudu Tamb C/G; Matage; N. Police Post; S. F Dagorawa; Tambura, C/Gari Ps Ab I; Tambura, C/Gari Ps Ab II; Tambura C/Gari Ps Ab III; T/Bayero I; T/Bayero II
Dawaki Kudu	Tsakuwa	Chakawa; Danbazan; Dukawa Ps C/Gari A/B I; Dukawa Ps, C/Gari A/B II; Dukawa Ps, C/Gari A/B III; Dukawa Ps, C/Gari A/B IV; Dukawa, Ps I; Dukawa, Ps II; Dispensary; Fansalla; Gidan Almajirai A/B; Islamiya A/B, K/Kudu; Islamiya K/Arewa A/B; Islamiya Ps Ab; Kirkwe, Vil. A/B; Lahirawa; Makera Jss; Muras A/B; Santolo Ps Ab; S/Wucawa; Shashauta; Zango Islamiya Ab; Zango Islamiya
Dawaki Kudu	Unguwar Duniya	Behun Fulani; Behun Dunawa; Goda Tsamiya; Unguwar Duniya P. S I; Unguwar Duniya P. S II; Wame; Yanali A
Dawaki Kudu	Yanbarau	Busaye P. S.; Busaye C/Gari; Fegi; Sarai C/Gari; Sarai G/Mama; Tamawa; Waman Sule; Yambarau I; Yambarau II; Yaburrawa
Dawaki Kudu	Yankatsari	Badawa I; Badawa II; Dispensary A/B; Dispensary; Tsamiya; Ung. Fawa A/B; Ung. Juma; Yanka Tsare
Dawaki Kudu	Yargaya	Baba Village; Dadin Kowa A/B; Dinya K/Kudu A/B; Dispensary Y/Gt Ab; Gwadogwado A/B; Kankare Dole; Kofar Yamma A/B; Launawa Ps A/B; Launawa Ps; Near B. C. C. I./Y/G; Yargaya Ps A/B I; Yargaya Ps A/B II; Yargaya Ps A/B III
Dawaki Kudu	Zogarawa	Nassarawar Doya I; Nassarawar Doya II; Zogarawa Ps I; Zogarawa Ps II
Dawaki Tofa	Dawaki East	Bambarawa; Katoge Yalladan; Maratayi I; Maratayi II; Rawa I; Rawaki; Sabon Gari I; Sabon Gari I A; Sabon Gari 2; Sabon Gari 2 B; Sarkakiya; Science College; Unguwar Liman I; Unguwar Liman II; Yarkanya; Yolai
Dawaki Tofa	Dawaki West	Alkausara; Badako I; Badako II Open Space (Badako II); Dawaki Special Pri. Sch. I (Bakin Hago I); Dawaki Special Pri. Sch. II (Bakin Hago II); Bakin Kasuwan Open Space (Bakin Kasuwa/Makera); Gwanji Pri. Sch. (Gwanji); Kofar Fada Court Premises (Kofar Fada); Islamiyya Pri. Sch. I (Kofar Kudu I); Islamiyya Pri. Sch. II (Kofar Kudu II); Kofar Yamma I Open Space I (Kofar Yamma I); Kofar Yamma II Open Space II (Kofar Yamma II)
Dawaki Tofa	Dawanau	Fagen Kawo I; Nassarawa Bagadawa; Bagadawa Saji; Baggadano; Bankaura; Bokawa/F; Chedi Maidala; Dawanau Cikin Gari I; Dawanau Cikin Gari II; Dawanau Cikin Gari III; Dawanau P. S I; Dawanau P. S II; Fagen Kawo 2; Janguru I; Janguru II; Kabi I; Kabi II; Rigar Rimi/Kabi; Rinji I; Rinji II; Rumfaku I; Rumfaku II; 1/2 Class Rabin Aji I (Unguwar Gado I); 1/2 Class Rabin Aji II (Unguwar Gado II); Unguwar Mata/Nakawo; Zangon Dawanau; Zogarawa I; Zogarawa II
Dawaki Tofa	Dan Guguwa	Danguguwa Cikin Gari I; Danguguwa Cikin Gari II; Gabari; Kabacawa; Kadawa; Karas; Rinji Unguwar Bashari; Saji/Dankomo; Sako; Sani Bere; Sarauniya I; Sarauniya II; Tukura Alako; Unguwar Fara I; Unguwar Fara II
Dawaki Tofa	Ganduje	Amarawa; Amarawa Damfami; Amarawa/D. Burguma; Damfami Tofa/Keba I; Danfami Burguma; Danfami Tofa/Keba; Gale; Ganduje Cikin Gari; Gungumawa; Jemomi; Kundoso; Roba Cikin Gari; Roba Unguwar Kudu; Saisai; Unguwar Malam; Unguwaryakubu; Walawa Roba
Dawaki Tofa	Gargari	Dundaye Dan Amar I; Dundaye Dan Amar II; Dungurawa Ung Fa I; Dungurawa Ung Fa II; Gargari Keba; Gudau; Gwamai, Munkebe I; Gwamai, Munkebe II; Hardandu; Kunnawar Majema; Munkebe I; Rawaki; Tsarauta Gargari I; Tsarauta Gargari II; Waddau; Yanrutun Gargari
Dawaki Tofa	Jalli	Geza I; Alkamawa; Badako Danbaba; Basake; Danitace I; Danitace II; Geza II; Jalli Cikin Gari I; Jalli Cikin Gari II; Kida/Dasha; Kofar Gabas; Kofar Yamma I; Kofar Yamma II; Kundawa Cikin Gari; Madachi I; Madachi II; Nahuche I; Nahuche II; Yunfawa I; Yunfawa Health Post (Yunfawa II); Yunfawa Mai Unguwa I; Yunfawa Mai Unguwa II
Dawaki Tofa	Kwa	Burun Tumau I; Burun Tumau II; Chedi Babbar Riga; Daneji I; Daneji II; G. G. S. S. Kwa; Katsalle; Keba Tudu; Kwa Cikin Gari I; Kwa Cikin Gari II; Kwa Cikin Gari III; Makada; Romi Makada; Sabaru Kuyaba; Yan Kunni I; Yan Kunni II; Yan Kunni III
Dawaki Tofa	Tattarawa	Bashirgi; Bansarki; Dangwaije; Diwanya; Fango Bashirigi; Jujin Dagarma; Kirya; Tagama Fulani; Tattarawa Cikin Gari I; Tattarawa Cikin Gari II; Tattarawa Cikin Gari III; Tattarawa Gamre; Tauraro; Walawa Zangon Mata; Zango Mata; Zaura Cikin Gari I; Zaura Cikin Gari II
Doguwa	Dariya	Dariya Shere I; Dariya Shere II; Dariya Tsohuwa; Daurawa; Dogon Ruwa; Maganda; Maituwo
Doguwa	Dogon Kawo	Beguwa; Burji, C/Gari I; Burji, C/Gari II; Burji, C/Gari III; Burji, C/Gari IV; Dogon Kawo I; Dogon Kawo II; Gulbai; Ruwan Faya; Ung. Gardi I; Ung. Gardi II; Ung. Lemo; Ung. Magaji
Doguwa	Duguwa	Dandabo; Dandoki; Doguwa Gabas I; Doguwa Gabas II; Doguwa Gabas III; Doguwa Tsakiya I; Doguwa Tsakiya II; Doguwa Yamma I; Doguwa Yamma II; Doguwa Gabas, Tsakiya I; Doguwa Gabas, Tsakiya II; Ung. Makeri I; Ung. Makeri II; Ung. Rama; Yan Tabarmi I; Yan Tabarmi II
Doguwa	Falgore	Dankuru; Falgore, D/Nimari I; Falgore, D/Nimari II; Falgore, Yamma I; Falgore, Yamma II; Falgore, Yamma III; Falgore, Yamma IV; Fanyabo; Gada Biyu I; Gada Biyu II; Jangefe; Jarkaya; Marmara; Tsangayar Ningi I; Tsangayar Ningi II; Yan Tabarimi
Doguwa	Maraku	Akwanto; Bahawa I; Bahawa II; Maraku I; Maraku II; Muntsira I; Muntsira II; Rafin Dadi; Ramin Kura; Ung. Malamai; Yalwan Danmusa I; Yalwan Danmusa II
Doguwa	Ragada	Bakarfa; Dadin Kowa I; Dadin Kowa II; Dadin Kowa III; D/Kowa, K/Fada I; D/Kowa, K/Fada II; D. Kowa, Power House; Lazuru; Makauta; Makarfai; Murai I; Murai II; Ragada; Ruwan Dinya; S/Kaura; Ung. Sauro; Ung. S/Kurmi
Doguwa	Ririwai	K/Fada; Kakume; Kamfani; Kwando I; Kwando II; Riruwai, C/Gari; Sabon Layi; Shuburu; Ung. Mahauta; Ung. Kanawa; Ung. Tanko
Doguwa	Tagwaye	Dokar Hudu; Kiko; Malam Gambo; Maigwado; Mai Kwandira; Murmushi; S/Kaura; Tagwaye I; Tagwaye II
Doguwa	Unguwar Natsohuwa	Babbar Fadama; Dokar Sati; Kurfi; Lungu; Takalafiya I; Takalafiya II; Tsauni; Ung. Munkaila; Ung. Natsohuwa
Doguwa	Zainabi	Daurawa; Dokar Goma; Gadar Namarke; Karasa; Machiya; Yalwa; Zainabi
Fagge	Fagge A	Dandali I; Dandali II; Dandali III; Dandali IV; Dandali V; Dandali VI; Dandali VII; Dandali VIII; El-Duniya I; El-Duniya II; El-Duniya III; El-Duniya IV; El-Duniya V; El-Duniya VI; El-Duniya VII; Haido Islamiya I; Haido Islamiya II; Haido Islamiya III; Haido Islamiya IV; Haido Islamiya V; Haido Islamiya VI; Haido Islamiya VII; Haido Islamiya VIII; Haido Islamiya IX; Plaza I; Plaza II; Plaza III; Plaza IV; Plaza V; Plaza VI; Plaza VII; Plaza VIII; Plaza IX; Unity Road I; Unity Road II
Fagge	Fagge B	Beirut Rd I; Beirut Rd II; Bello Rd I; Bello Rd II; Bello Dandago I; Bello Dandago II; Dandalin Fagge I; Dandalin Fagge II; Dandalin Fagge III; Dandalin Fagge IV; Dandalin Fagge V; Dandalin Fagge VI; Fagge Sps I; Fagge Sps II; Fagge Sps III; Fagge Sps IV; Fagge Sps V; Fagge Sps VI; Fagge Sps VII; Fagge Sps VIII; Fagge Sps IX; Fagge Sps X; Fagge Sps XI; Fagge Sps XII; Fagge Sps XIII; Fagge Sps XIV; Niger Rd; Ofishin Galadima I; Ofishin Galadima II; Ofishin Galadima III; Ofishin Galadima IV; Ofishin Galadima V; Ofishin Galadima VI; Railway Qtrs I; Railway Qtrs II; Railway Qtrs III; Railway Qtrs IV
Fagge	Fagge C	Kofar M. Haido I; Kofar M. Haido II; Kofar M. Haido III; Kofar M. Haido IV; Kofar M. Haido V; Kofar M. Haido VI; Kofar M. Haido VII; Kofar Sanda M/Barewa I; Kofar Sanda, M/Barewa II; Kofar Sanda, M/Barewa III; Kofar Sanda, M/Barewa IV; Kofar Sanda, M/Barewa V; Kofar Sanda, M/Barewa VI; Kofar Sanda, M/Barewa VII; Wakilin Tsafta I; Wakilin Tsafta II; Wakilin Tsafta III; Wakilin Tsafta IV; Wakilin Tsafta V; Wakilin Tsafta VI; Wakilin Tsafta VII; Wakilin Tsafta VIII
Fagge	Fagge D	Gidan M/Unguwa I; Gidan M/Unguwa II; Gidan M/Unguwa III; Kampala I; Kampala II; Kampala III; Kampala IV; Kampala V; Kampala VI; Kampala VII; Kampala VIII; Kampala IX; Kampala X; Kuka P. S. I; Kuka P. S. II; Kuka P. S. III; Kuka P. S. IV; Kuka P. S. V; Kuka P. S. VI; Kuka P. S. VII
Fagge	Fagge E	Kurna P. S I; Kurna P. S. II; Kurna P. S. III; Kurna P. S. IV; Kurna P. S. V; Kurna P. S. VI; Kurna P. S. VII; Kurna P. S. VIII; Kurna P. S. IX; Kurna P. S. X; Kurna P. S. XI; Kurna P. S. XII; Kurna P. S. XIII; Kurna P. S. XIV; Layin Dabinai I; Layin Dabinai II; Layin Dabinai III; Layin Dabinai IV; Layin Dabinai V; Layin Dabinai VI; Layin Dabinai VII; Layin Dabinai VIII; Mai Kwaru, Primary I; Mai Kwaru, Primary II; Mai Kwaru, Primary III; Mai Kwaru, Primary IV; Mai Kwaru, Primary V; Mai Kwaru, Primary VI; Mai Kwaru, Primary VII; Mai Kwaru, Primary VIII; Wapa I; Wapa II; Wapa III; Wapa IV; Wapa V; Wapa VI; Wapa VII; Wapa VIII; Wapa IX; Wapa X; Wapa XI; Wapa XII
Fagge	Kwachiri	Kauyen Alfa I; Kauyen Alfa II; Army Day Pr. Sch. I; Army Day Pr. Sch. II; Army Day Pr. Sch. III; Army Day Pr. Sch. IV; Gobirawa, Pr. Sch. I; Gobirawa, Pr. Sch. II; Gobirawa, Pr. Sch. III; Gobirawa, A Pr. Sch. IV; Gobirawa, Pr. Sch. V; Gobirawa, Pr. Sch. VI; Gobirawa, Pr. Sch. VII; Gobirawa, Pr. Sch. VIII; Gobirawa, Pr. Sch. IX; Gobirawa, Pr. Sch. X; Gobirawa, Pr. Sch. XI; Gobirawa, Pr. Sch. XII; Jaba I; Jaba II; Jaba III; Jalli, Pri. Sch.; Kofar Dan Rimi I; Kofar Dan Rimi II; Kofar Mai Unguwa; Kurna Gabas I; Kurna Gabas II; Kurna Gabas III; Kurna Gabas IV; Kurna Gabas V; Kwachirin Dikko I; Kwachirin Dikko II; Kwachirin Jobe I; Kwachirin Jobe II; Kwachirin Jobe III; Layin Chediya I; Layin Chediya II; Layin Tsamiya; Mami Market I; Mami Market II; Mami Market III; Mami Market IV; N A A Qtrs I; N A A Qtrs II; 303 Naf Qtrs I; 303 Naf Qtrs II; Sabon Titi, Dan Rimi; Sakwaya; Ramat, Pr. Sch.; Tudun Bojuwa I; Tudun Bojuwa II
Fagge	Rijiyar Lemo	Gawon Ali I; Gawon Ali II; Gawon Ali III; Gawon Ali IV; Gawon Ali V; Gawon Ali VI; Gawon Ali VII; Gawon Ali VIII; Gawon Ali IX; Gawon Ali X; Kwanar Dan Rimi I; Kwanar Dan Rimi II; Kwanar Dan Rimi III; Kwanar Dan Rimi IV; Kwanar Dan Rimi V; Kwanar Dan Rimi VI; Kwanar Dan Rimi VII; Kwanar Dan Rimi VIII; Kwanar Dan Rimi IX; Kwanar Dan Rimi X; Kwanar Dan Rimi XI; Kwanar Dan Rimi XII; Kwanar Dan Rimi XIII; Kwanar Yan Tifa I; Kwanar Yan Tifa II; Kwanar Yan Tifa III; Kwanar Yan Tifa IV; Kwanar Yan Tifa V; Kwanar Yan Tifa VI; Kwanar Yan Tifa VII; Kwanar Yan Tifa VIII; Kwanar Yan Tifa IX; Kwanar Yan Tifa X; Kwanar Yan Tifa XI
Fagge	Sabongari East	Ado Bayero, Sqr I; Ado Bayero, Sqr II; Ado Bayero, Sqr III; Ado Bayero, Sqr IV; Ado Bayero, Sqr V; Ado Bayero, Sqr VI; Ado Bayero, Sqr VII; Ado Bayero, Sqr VIII; Ado Bayero, Sqr IX; Dabo P. S. I; Dabo P. S. II; Dabo P. S. III; Dabo P. S. IV; Dabo P. S. V; Dabo P. S. VI; Dan Waire P. S. I; Dan Waire P. S. II; Dan Waire P. S. III; Dan Waire P. S. IV; Dan Waire P. S. V; Dan Waire P. S. VI; Dan Waire P. S. VII; Dan Waire P. S. VIII; Dan Waire P. S. IX; Dan Waire P. S. X; Dan Waire P. S. XI; K. T. C. I; K. T. C. II; K. T. C. III; K. T. C. IV; K. T. C. V; Maikwatashi I; Maikwatashi II; Maikwatashi III; Maikwatashi IV; Maikwatashi V; Maikwatashi VI; Riga, Primary School I; Riga Primary School II; Riga Primary School III; Riga Primary School IV; Riga Primary School V; Riga Primary School VI; Zawai Primary School I; Zawai Primary School II; Zawai Primary School III
Fagge	Sabongari West	Ansaruddeen Pr., Sch. I; Ansaruddeen Pr., Sch. II; Ansaruddeen Pr., Sch. III; Ansaruddeen Pr., Sch. IV; Ansaruddeen Pr., Sch. V; Ansaruddeen Pr., Sch. VI; Ansaruddeen Pr., Sch. VII; Ansaruddeen Pr., Sch. VIII; Ansaruddeen Pr., Sch. IX; Ansaruddeen Pr., Sch. X; Ansaruddeen Pr., Sch. XI; Ansaruddeen Pr., Sch. XII; Ansaruddeen Pr., Sch. XIII; Ansaruddeen Pr., Sch. XIV; Ansaruddeen Pr., Sch. XV; Ansaruddeen Pr., Sch. XVI; Ansaruddeen Pr., Sch. XVII; Ansaruddeen Pr., Sch. XVIII; Ansaruddeen Pr., Sch. XIX; Ansaruddeen Pr., Sch. XX; Ansaruddeen Pr., Sch. XXI; Kwakwachi, Primary School I; Kwakwachi, Primary School II; Kwakwachi, Primary School III; Kwakwachi, Primary School IV; Kwakwachi, Primary School V; Kwakwachi, Primary School VI; Kwakwachi, Primary School VII; Kwakwachi, Primary School VIII; Kwakwachi, Primary School IX; Kwakwachi, Primary School X; Kwakwachi, Primary School XI; Kwakwachi, Primary School XII; Kwakwachi, Primary School XIII; Kwakwachi, Primary School XIV; Kwakwachi, Primary School XV; Kwakwachi, Primary School XVI; Kwakwachi, Primary School XVII; Lux, Bus Stop I; Lux, Bus Stop II; Lux, Bus Stop III; Rumfa, Primary School I; Rumfa, Primary School II; Rumfa, Primary School III; Rumfa, Primary School IV; Rumfa, Primary School V; Rumfa, Primary School VI; Rumfa, Primary School VII; Rumfa, Primary School VIII; Rumfa, Primary School IX; Rumfa, Primary School X; Rumfa, Primary School XI; Rumfa, Primary School XII
Fagge	Yammata	Kofar Dagachi I; Kofar Dagachi II; Kofar Dagachi III; Kofar Dagachi IV; Kofar Dagachi V; Kofar Dagachi VI; Kofar Dagachi VII; Kofar Mai Unguwa I; Kofar Mai Unguwa II; Kofar Mai Unguwa III; Kofar Mai Unguwa IV; Kofar Mai Unguwa V; Kofar Mai Unguwa VI; Kofar Sarki Kasuwa I; Kofar Sarki Kasuwa II; Yada Gammo I; Yada Gammo II; Yada Gammo III
Gabasawa	Garun Danga	Beru Barnawa; Dagar Yamma; Doga Cikin Gari; Fangan Gandu; Galeji; Gambawa Retai; Garun Danga Cikin Gari; Garun Hallai/Takalamawa; Garin Malam; Islamiya Garun Danga; Masaku; Nasarawa Gandu; Takalmawa; Tsugudidi; Unguwar Gande
Gabasawa	Joda	Barawa; Dorinawa; Fanteku; Hunbinare; Jigawar Buya; Joda Cikin Gari; Marayar Kuka; Santsi, Cikin Gari; Santsi Gande; Tumbau Joda; Yangizo; Yangwan, Cikin Gari; Wasarde, Cikin Gari; Wasarde, Lunkui
Gabasawa	Karmami	Falali; Fasawa; Gamaryawa Mazauta; Gumawa, Cikin Gari; Gumawa Yamma; Jijitar Yamma; Jijitar Gabas; Jijitar Kwankiyal; Karmami, Cikin Gari; Karmami, Badahaka; Karmami, Gabas; Karmami, Jama'A; Karmami, Yamma; Mazauta, Cikin Gari; Mazauta Sagwamma; Tanda
Gabasawa	Mekiya	Badawa, Cikin Gari; Badaw, Larabawa; Ballagaza; Chikajoto; Gwajabe/Unguwar Galadima; Kumbo, Cikin Gari; Magama; Malamawa Mekiya; Mazan Gudu, Cikin Gari I; Mazan Gudu, Cikin Gari II; Mazan Gudu, Sabon Gari; Mekiya, Cikin Gari; Mekiya, Yamma; Muntsira/Kadage; Unguwar Zakarai/Gagarawa
Gabasawa	Tarauni	Jugoron Dangage; Jugoron Fulani; Jugoron Kanawa; Tarauni, Cikin Gari; Tarauni, Larabawa; Wailare, Cikin Gari; Wailare, Jinan; Wailare Kumbotso
Gabasawa	Yantar Arewa	Gambawa Kanawa; Sauna, Cikin Gari; Shana, Cikin Gari; Shana, Dudumawai; Shana, Kadage; Yandake, Cikin Gari; Yandake, Garin Kuka /Daurawa; Yautar Arewa, Cikin Garin; Yautar Arewa, Tsalle; Zaidawa Bakki
Gabasawa	Yautar Kudu	Bariya Wailare; Guruma/Bula; Kumbotso; Kwankwachi; Kwartawa; Kwazari; Yaranchi/Marayar Gawo; Yaranchi Zubau; Yarkanya/Digawa; Yarzabaina, Cikin Gari; Yarzabaina, Nassarawa; Yautar Kudu, Cikin Gari
Gabasawa	Yumbu	Gidilo Kudu; Gidilo Yamma; Kafamai, Cikin Gari; Kafamai, Kwarin Wanbai; Saiye, Cikin Garin; Yadai, Cikin Gari; Yadai Changa; Yamar Kanawa; Yumbu, Cikin Gari
Gabasawa	Zakirai	Tankarau, Cikin Gari; Tankarau, Kadage Barnawa; Zakirai Kasco; Zakirai Kudu I; Zakirai Kudu II; Zakirai Library I; Zakiraii Library II; Zakirai, Sp. Pri. School I; Zakirai, Sp. Pri. School II; Zakirai, Tv. Centre I; Zakirai, Tv. Centre II; Zakirai, Tudun Wada I; Zakirai, Tudun Wada II; Zakirai, Women Centre I; Zakirai, Women Centre II; Zakirai, Yamma
Gabasawa	Zugachi	Gunduwa/Nassarawa; Gunduwa Jama'A; Gunduwa Unguwa Uku; Tofai, Cikin Gari; Tofai, Kiyawa; Zugachi Kuru-Kuru; Zugachi Ubakarawa; Zugachi Kakau; Zugachi Gabas; Zugachi Islamiya; Zugachi Alalula; Zugachi Yamma; Zugachi Jalogare/W-Mahauta
Garko	Dal	Dashi; Fancha I; Fancha II; Fancha III; Kogon Doki; Mijin; Randa I; Randa II; Sabon Garin Karfau; Shata; Shuwo; Tiya Labdago; Tsakuwar Baki; Tsakuwar Dal
Garko	Garin Ali	Addawa I; Addawa II; Addawa III; Cediya I; Cediya II; Cediya III; Garin Ali Hurumi I; Garin Ali Hurumi II; Garin Ali Hurumi III; Kastinawa I; Kastinawa II; Lama; Shayawa; Zabaran
Garko	Kafin Malamai	Babban Baure; Bankanon Fulani; Butun; Danin; Kafin Malamai Hurumi I; Kafin Malamai Hurumi II; Kafin Malamai Hurumi III; Kutunkawa; Lamire Hurumi I; Lamire Hurumi II; Mawashi; Sabon Garin K/Malamai I; Sabon Garin K/Malamai II; Turakawa; Yandungwi; Zumbulawa
Garko	Katumari	Bingin Kari; Gidan Baji; Katumari Hurumi; Kukar Lafiya; Sanni Gabas I; Sanni Gabas II; Sanni Yamma I; Sanni Yamma II; Unguwar Bussau; Unguwar Kuka; Yamari
Garko	Kwas	Buda Hurumi I; Buda Hurumi II; Dawaki Buda; Fafurai; Galadanci; Kuraye; Kurundawa; Kwas Hurumi I; Kwas Hurumi II; Makaman Kudu I; Narya I; Narya II
Garko	Raba	Auduga I; Auduga II; Beguwa; Burundun; Garwaji I; Garwaji II; Kakiya; Kawo Burus I; Kawo Burus II; Kawo Hurumi I; Kawo Hurumi II; Makadi Farau I; Makadi Farau II; Makadi Hurumi; Makadi Saikahu; Makadi Sawa; Raba Hurumi I; Raba Hurumi II
Garko	Sarina	Kera Dukawa; Kera Hurumi I; Kera Hurumi II; Kofar Arewa I; Kofar Arewa II; Kutunka Arewa I; Kutunka Arewa II; Kutunka Arewa III; Mara; Unguwar Madugu I; Unguwar Madugu II; Yamman Kudu I; Yamman Kudu II; Zangon Barkono I; Zangon Barkono II
Garko	Zakarawa	Jimfire; Kafin Ciri I; Kafin Ciri II; Kira Kira; Tasafe; Tsamiya; Yarka; Zakarawa Hurumi I; Zakarawa Hurumi II
Garun Malam	Chiromawa	Agalawa I Open Space (Agalawa I); Agalawa II Open Space (Agalawa II); Chiromawa Ciki I; Chiromawa Ciki II Open Space (Chiromawa Ciki II); Chiromawa Idi I Open Space (Chiromawa Idi I); Chiromawa Idi II; Chiromawa Kwari; Chiromawa Sintili I Open Space (Chiromawa Sintili I); Chiromawa Sintili II; Chiromawa Waziri; Galadimawa Open Space (Galadimawa); Hayin Nayaya; Kulin Dabori; Unguwar Kasco I; Unguwar Kasco II Open Space (Unguwar Kasco II)
Garun Malam	Dorawar-Sallau	Agalawa I; Agalawa II; Bakin Ruwa; Dorawar Sallau; Kargo I; Kargo II; Raje; Ringimawa; Unguwar Galadima
Garun Malam	Fankurun	Fankurun I; Fankurun II; Kofar Arewa; Riga I; Riga II; Tsaure; Yanaba
Garun Malam	Garun Babba	Bangaza Open Space (Bangaza I); Bangaza Primary School (Bangaza II); Garun Babba Open Space (Garun Babba I); Garun Babba II; Garun Babba Kudu I; Garun Babba Kudu II; Hayin Ruwa; Kudu Refawa Open Space (Kudu Refawa); Kuran Open Space (Kuran); Kuran Liman Open Space (Kuran Liman); Sabon Gari; Unguwar Tsigi
Garun Malam	Garun Malam	Bakin Kasuwa Arewa I; Bakin Kasuwa Arewa II; Bakin Kasuwa Kudu I; Bakin Kasuwa Kudu II; Gabas Fada; Kofar Gabas; Kofar Hardo Yamma I; Kofar Hardo Yamma II; Kofar Kudu; Kofar Yamma I; Kofar Yamma II Open Space (Kofar Yamma II); Kyampawa; Liman Makole Ciki; Liman Makole Waje; Rijiyar Gwari; Ringimawa I; Ringimawa II
Garun Malam	Jobawa	Jobawa Ciki; Lanjan; Maje; Riga; Yan Ciko; Yashi; Yaulen Kwari; Yaulen Tudu; Zango; Zango Kudu
Garun Malam	Kadawa	Kadawa Ciki I; Kadawa Ciki II; Kadawa Gate; Kadawa Zango I; Kadawa Zango II; Quarters; Sabon Gari I; Sabon Gari II; Sabon Gari III; Unguwar Malamai; Yan Gajiri; Yan Tomo
Garun Malam	Makwaro	Agalwa I; Agalwa II; Agalawar Sabon Fegi; Kwarkyan I; Kwarkyan II; Kwiwar Gabas; Kwiwar Yamma I; Kwiwar Yamma II; Makwaro Ciki I; Makwaro Ciki II; Makwaro Tudu I; Makwaro Tudu II; Samawa; Unguwa Uku
Garun Malam	Yad Akwari	Cedi Gabas; Cedi Yamma; Dan Maura; Kofar Fada; Marmara I; Marmara II; Tudun Fulani; Yadakwari Ciki I; Yadakwari Ciki II; Yadakwari Ciki III
Garun Malam	Yalwan Yadakwari	Boko Primary School (Boko); Dakasoye I; Dakasoye II; Dumaji; Mabuga; Mudawa; Shafawa; Tura-Da-Sau; Unguwar Rimi; Yalwan Kudu I; Yalwan Kudu II
Gaya	Balan	Balan, Cikin Gari; Darmanawa; Dumawa Kyautar Allah I; Dumawa Kyautar Allah II; Jemagu; Jibawa, Cikin Gari I; Jibawa, Cikin Gari II; Jigal; Jigawa; Kuntaru; Moda; Shaura; Zanguwa
Gaya	Gaya Arewa	Alagarna/Muna Muna; Alkala I; Alkala II; Alkala III; Bangashe C/Garin I; Bangashe C/Garin II; Burji/Dagarawa; Chiranchi; Dabkaibabba/ Karama; Dabo Kanka/Yan Albarka; Dogarai; Gaci /Dashina; Gyanawa I; Gyanawa II; Gyanawa III; Gyanawa IV; Harunawa/Unguwar Gabas; Kauyas; Kofar Gabari; Kofar Saro; Lemon Dan-Iya; Matamawa I; Matamawa II; Rura; Sindi Gabas I; Sindi Gabas II; Sindi Yamma I; Sindi Yamma II; Sindi Yamma III; Sindi Yamma IV; Tudunwada/ Yangero; Zango I; Zango II
Gaya	Gaya Kudu	Alawa I; Alawa II; Bagoge I; Bagoge II; Gori Near W/Head House; Ishifawa I - Gaya Prison; Ishifawa II - Gaya Prison; Maza Goma - Women Centre; Mazagowa I- Lemo; Mazagowa II- Lemo; Rinda Tozo - Ridatozo P. School; Sharifawa I Yan Garki; Sharifawa II K/Gidan Kabiru Kam; Saya-Saya Durimin Saya Saya; Tani Gaya Dispensary I; Tani Gaya Dispensary II; Tani Gaya Dispensary III; Unguwar Fawa Gaya Dispensary I; Unguwar Fawa Gaya Dispensary II; Unguwar Kaya - Gandu Pri. School; Unguwar Kofa - Dandalin U/Kofa I; Unguwar Kofa - Dandalin U/Kofa II; Unguwar Mahaukaci - Bariki I; Unguwar Mahaukaci - Bariki II; Unguwar Mahaukaci Hasumiya
Gaya	Gamarya	Darai C/Gari; Gamarya - Pri. School; Galadima/ Musabar Musabar P. Schl; Kadani/Zango Gamarya P. School; Zambur Cikingari Yamma Zambur Pri. School; Zambur Yamma Zambur Pri. School
Gaya	Gamoji	Gamoji Cikin Gari I; Gamoji Cikingari II; Jahunawa; Jama'Ar Gamji I; Jama'Ar Gamji II; Kagadama; Kwarsa/Laran/Kwari; Sabaru
Gaya	Kademi	Agundawa; Fasau; Filiki; Gale/Kaura/Janki; Gunda I; Gunda II; Kabu; Kademi Kudu I; Kademi Kudu II; Kademi Kudu III; Kademi Sosai I; Kademi Sosai II; Kademi Sosai III; Kembo; Kembo, Cikin Gari I; Kembo, Cikin Gari II; Kunnawa; Kera, Cikin Gari; Kera, Zango; Unguwar Gyada; Tambuli; Yansoro Kaura; Yansoro Tudu/Kwari
Gaya	Kazurawa	Jamar Fulani; Kaura, Cikin Gari; Kalahaddi, Cikin Gari I; Kalahaddi, Cikin Gari II; Kalhaddi M/Bako; Kazurawa, Cikin Gari; Lautai Kudu/Arewa; Lautai Machina; Matsawar Kudu/Arewa; Tawuti/Yuwa; Yankau Cikin Gari I; Yankau, Cikin Gari II; Yola Arewa I; Yola Gabas I; Yola Gabas II; Yola Arewa II
Gaya	Maimakawa	Argida; Asayaya; Bayawa; Fan'Idau, Cikin Gari; Gidan Sarkin Noma; Gul; Hausawa I; Hausawa II; Injiwa; Ka'El; Kurta; Madakanchi; Maimakawa Ckin Gari; Rafinkofa; Tsaida I; Tsaida II; Tsohuwar Tsangaya; Yalwan Makama
Gaya	Shagogo	Aku/Baraukiji/Dangagarau I; Aku/Baraukiji/Dangagarau II; Danbaida; Gwaida; Zobe Cikin Gari; Kano Lafiya; Lasanawa Madaki/Makama; Shagogo Magaji; Shagogo Dawaki I; Shagogo Dawaki II; Shabewa; Sharifai/Jahunawa; Talatargoma Lochi; Yan Audu/Zango Ita I; Yan Audu/Zango Ita II; Zorama
Gaya	Wudilawa	Amarawa I; Amarawa II; Chikulo; Dozin Pri. School; Gungara I; Gungara II; Handawaki; Kanfaci; Kassai; Kurna; Wudilawa Cikin Gari
Gezawa	Babawa	Amarawa I; Amarawa II; Amarawa III; Amarawa IV; Unguwar Jama'A G/Mai Unguwa; Babawa; Dan Sarai I; Dan Sarai II; Garke I; Garke II; Indabo; Kastinawa; Kwara; Ranawa; Tammawa; Tokarawa; Ung. Jama'A; Zainawa I; Zainawa II
Gezawa	Gawo	Andawa I; Andawa II; Goforo, Primary School; Gofaro, Yamma; Gawo Primary School I; Gawo, Primary School II; Nahuce; Sharifawa, Primary School; Tofa, G/Mai Unguwar; Tofa/Zarya; Tararraba; Yafata, Maigari
Gezawa	Gezawa	Bujawa, C/Gari Open Space; Bujawa Fulani, Open Space; Dangoro Fulani I; Dangoro Fulani II; Yar Kogi Garinmati; Kofar Kudu, Pr. Sch.; Kofar Arewa, Islamiya Pr. Sch. I; Kofar Arewa, Islamiya Pr. Sch. II; Kofar Arewa, C/Gari; Sabon Fuloti, Primary School; Sabon Fuloti, C/Gari; Zango I; Zango II; Yarkogi Fulani, Open Space; Yarkogi, C/Gari; Yarkogi, C/Gari Yamma
Gezawa	Jogana	Baburko, Cikin Gari; Dausayi I; Dausayi II; Dausayi III; Daurawa; Jogama, Primary School; Jogana, G. S. S. S. Secondary Sch.; Juya Cikin Gari, Open Space; Jirmawa, Cikin Gari; Kadema, C/Gari; Sabon Layi, C/Gari I; Sabon Layi, C/Gari II; Unguwar Kara, Open-Space; Unguwar Kara, C/Gari; Unguwar Tudu, Open Space; Unguwar Fulani, Open Space; Unguwar Fulani, Pr. Sch; Danzaki Yar Gunda I; Danzaki Yar Gunda II; Danzaki Yar Gunda III; Danzaki Yarako I; Danzaki Yarako II; Danzaki Yarako III
Gezawa	Ketawa	Gandu W. T. C., W. T. C.; Janariya, Open-Space; Jamaar Kwagwar I; Jamaar Kwagwar II; Ketawa, Primary School; Ketawa, Cikin Gari; Kuka Yarowa, C/Gari; Sharifai, Kukar; Tsomashi I; Tsomashi II; Tsamiyar Kara, Open Space; Tsamiyar Kara, C/Gari; Danja Ung. Daudu I; Danja Ung. Daudu II; Danja Ung. Daudu III; Danja Ung. Domai I; Danja Ung. Domai II; Yammusa
Gezawa	Mesar-Tudu	Barwa, Primary School; Bangare, Primary School; Baita, G/Mai Unguwar; Bangare, G/Mai Unguwar; Gudal, Primary School; Gudal, G/Mai Unguwar; Iyatanchi, Primary School; Mesar Tudu, Primary School; Mesar Burami, Primary School; Kwarin-Kudi Kautai, Primary School; Sankarawa, Primary School; Sankarawa, C/Gari
Gezawa	Sararin-Gezawa	Bare-Sawaba, Primary School; Bare-Sawaba, C/Gari Open Space; Danladi, Primary School; Danladi, C/Gari Open Spacel; Magarya Primary School; Sabon Gari, Primary School; Sararin Primary School; Sarari C/Gari, Open Space; Sabon Gari
Gezawa	Tsamiya-Babba	Auja Rawar Alkali, Open Space; Auja Rawar Madachi, Open Space; Abasawa C/Gari; Durmin Shura C/Gari; Doka P. S.; Kakara I; Kakara II; Kadage; Malami Gandu I; Malamai Gamdu II; Tsamiya Babba I; Tsamiya Babba II; Warwarawa, C/Gari I; Warwarawa, C/Gari II; Yalmar Rabawa I; Yalmal-Rabawa II; Yalmar Mabuga; Durumin Shura
Gezawa	Tumbau	Amarawa, C/Gari Open Space; Dogarai Tsamiya, Open Space I; Dogarai Tsamiya Open Space II; Kankan Nasara; Ganji-Tara; Kwarkuya; Kankan Nasara, Primary School; Musku, Primary School; Tumbau, Primary School I; Tumbau Primary School II; Tumbau Primary School III; Tsauni Cikin Gari, Open Space
Gezawa	Wangara	Daguzau, Primary School; Kutil, Cikin Gari; Kafi Wangara; Karfe; Uran, Primary; Wangara, Primary School; Wangara, C/Gari; Yola Mafada, Open Space; Yola Mafada Cikin Gari; Yola Wasarde Open Space; Wan Gara Pr. Sch; Wangara Gabas I; Wangara Gabas II
Gwale	Dandago	Fanfan Wanka& Open Space I (Dandago, Primary School VI); Fanfan Wanka& Open Space II (Dandago, Primary School VII); Dandago, Primary School III; Dandago, Primary School IV; Dandago, Primary School V; Fanfan Wanka& Open Space III (Dandago, Primary School VIII); Fanfan Wanka& Open Space IV (Dandago, Primary School IX); Garangamawa/Buhari Islamiyya School I; Garangamawa/Buhari Islamiyya School II; Garangamawa/Buhari Islamiyya School III; Garangamawa/Buhari Islamiyya School IV; Maitasa Isl. School I (Garangamawa/Buhari Islamiyya School V); Maitasa Isl. School II (Garangamawa/Buhari Islamiyya School VI); Maitasa Isl. School III (Garangamawa/Buhari Islamiyya School VII); Madungurun/ Buhari Islamiyya School I; Madungurun/ Buhari Islamiyya School II; Madungurun/ Buhari Islamiyya School III; Madungurun/ Buhari Islamiyya School IV; Madungurun/ Buhari Islamiyya School V
Gwale	Diso	Chiranchi/Filin Chiranchi I; Chiranchi/Filin Chiranchi II; Chiranchi/Filin Chiranchi III; Chiranchi/Filin Chiranchi IV; Gidan Ahmed Santare; Gidan Maiunguwa; Gwale Primary School I; Gwale Primary School II; Gwale, Primary School III; Gwale, Primary School IV; Gwale, Primary School V; Veterinary Clinic, Gwale I I (Gwale, Primary School VI); Veterinary Clinic, Gwale II II (Gwale, Primary School VII); Veterinary Clinic, Gwale III III (Gwale, Primary School VIII); Gidan Shehu, Mai Hula; Gidan Mai Unguwa; Veterinary Clinic I; Veterinary Clinic II; G. S. S. Warure I; G. S. S. Warure II
Gwale	Dorayi	B. U. K. Old Site I; B. U. K. Old Site II; B. U. K. Old Site III; B. U. K. Old Site IV; B. U. K. Old Site V; Dorayi Babba/V. L. C. I; Dorayi Babba/V. L. C. II; Dorayi Babba/V. L. C. III; Dorayi Babba Janbulo I; Dorayi Babba, Janbulo II; Dorayi Babba, Bakin Bulo; Dorayi Babba, Forestry I; Dorayi Babba, Forestry II; Dorayi Karama/ Primary School I; Dorayi Karama/ Primary School II; Dorayi Karama/ Primary School III; Gidan Sarki Dorayi Open Space I (Dorayi Karama/ Primary School IV); Gidan Sarki Dorayi Open Space II (Dorayi Karama/ Primary School V); Gidan Sarki Dorayi Open Space III (Dorayi Karama/ Primary School VI); Jaen Gabas, Primary School; Jaen Yamma, Primary School I; Jaen Yamma, Primary School II; Jaen Yamma, Primary School III; Rinji Gidan, Mai Unguwa
Gwale	Galadanchi	Gidan Galadima, Primary School I; Gidan Galadima, Primary School II; Gidan Galadima, Primary School III; Gidan Galadima, Primary School IV; Filin Galadanchi Open Space I (Gidan Galadima, Primary School V); Filin Galadanchi Open Space II (Gidan Galadima, Primary School VI); Hausawa Abdullahi, Suka Islamiya School I; Hausawa Abdullahi, Suka Islamiya School II; Hausawa Abdullahi, Suka Islamiya School III; Hausawa Abdullahi, Suka Islamiya School IV; Hausawa Abdullahi, Suka Islamiya School V; Sararin Awaisu Open Space I (Hausawa Abdullahi, Suka Islamiya School VI); Sararin Awaisu Open Space II (Hausawa Abdullahi, Suka Islamiya School VII); Sararin Awaisu Open Space III (Hausawa Abdullahi, Suka Islamiya School VIII); Sararin Awaisu Open Space IV (Hausawa Abdullahi, Suka Islamiya School IX); Sararin Awaisu Open Space V (Hausawa Abdullahi, Suka Islamiya School X); Filin Sarkin Kurame Open Space I (Hausawa Abdullahi, Suka Islamiya School XI); Filin Sarkin Kurame Open Space II (Hausawa Abdullahi, Suka Islamiya School XII); Filin Gidan Umaru Mai Kaji Open Space I (Magashi Gidan Galadim, A Primary School I); Filin Gidan Umaru Mai Kaji Open Space II (Magashi Gidan Galadima, Primary School II); Filin Gidan Umaru Mai Kaji Open Space III (Magashi Gidan Galadima, Primary School III); Filin Gidan Umaru Mai Kaji Open Space IV (Magashi Gidan Galadima, Primary School IV); Filin Gidan Umaru Mai Kaji Open Space V (Magashi Gidan Galadima, Primary School V); Kofar Gidan Barau Open Space I (Magashi Gidan Galadima, Primary School VI); Kofar Gidan Barau Open Space II (Magashi Gidan Galadima, Primary School VII); Kofar Gidan Barau Open Space III (Magashi Gidan Galadima, Primary School VIII); Kofar Gidan Barau Open Space IV (Magashi Gidan Galadima, Primary School IX); Kofar Gidan Barau Open Space V (Magashi Gidan Galadima, Primary School X)
Gwale	Goron Dutse	Dausayi I; Dausayi II; Dausayi III; Dausayi IV; Dausayi V; Dausayi VI; Dausayi VII; Filin Zakka I; Filin Zakka II; Filin Zakka III; Filin Zakka IV; Darun Ma?Aruf Pri. Sch. I (Goron Dutse, Primary School I); Darun Ma?Aruf Pri. Sch. II (Goron Dutse, Primary School II); Warure, Primary School I; Warure, Primary School II; Warure, Primary School III; Warure, Primary School IV; Warure, Primary School V; Warure, Primary School VI; Warure, Primary School VII
Gwale	Gwale	Gwale Pri. Sch. I; Gwale Pri. Sch. II; Gwale Pri. Sch. III; Gwale Pri. Sch. IV; Gwale Pri. Sch. V; Gwale Health Centre (Gwale Pri. Sch. VI); Gwale Health Center; Gwale, Health Center; G. A. T. C. Gwale I; G. A. T. C. Gwale II; G. A. T. C. Gwale III; G. S. S Gwale; Lokon Makera, Kofar Naisa Pri. Sch I; Lokon Makera, Kofar Naisa Pri. Sch II; Lokon Makera, Kofar Naisa Pri. Sch III; Lokon Makera, Kofar Naisa Pri. Sch IV; Lokon Makera, Kofar Naisa Pri. Sch V; G. G. S. S. Kofar Na?Isa I (Lokon Makera, Kofar Naisa Pri. Sch VI); G. G. S. S. Kofar Na?Isa II (Lokon Makera, Kofar Naisa Pri. Sch VII); G. G. S. S. Kofar Na?Isa III (Lokon Makera Kofar Naisa Pri. Sch VIII); G. G. S. S. Kofar Na?Isa IV (Lokon Makera Kofar Naisa Pri. Sch IX); Mubaru Islamiyya School I (Lokon Makera Kofar Naisa Pri. Sch X); Mubaru Islamiyya School II (Lokon Makera Kofar Naisa Pri. Sch XI); Mubaru Islamiyya School III (Lokon Makera Kofar Naisa Pri. Sch XII)
Gwale	Gyaranya	Akwa Rijiya I; Akwa Rijiya II; Akwa Rijiya III; Akwa Rijiya IV; Gyaranya, Islamiya School I; Gyaranya, Islamiya School II; Gyaranya, Islamiya School III; Gyaranya, Islamiya School IV; Gyaranya, Islamiya School V; Gyaranya, Islamiya School VI; Gyaranya, Islamiya School VII; Gyaranya, Islamiya School VIII; Gidan Mai Unguwa I; Gidan Mai Unguwa II; Gidan Mai Unguwa III; Gidan Mai Unguwa IV; Sudawa Islamiya School I; Sudawa Islamiya School II; Sudawa Islamiya School III
Gwale	Kabuga	A. T. C.; Federal College Of Education (F. C. T.) I; Federal College Of Education (F. C. T.) II; Filin Maulidi I; Filin Maulidi II; Gidan Isyaka I; Gidan Isyaka II; Gidan Mahaukata I; Gidan Mahaukata II; Gidan Mahaukata III; Gidan Mahaukata IV; Kofar Waika, Gidan Maiunguwa I; Kofar Waika, Gidan Maiunguwa II; Kofar Waika, Gidan Maiunguwa III; Kofar Kansakali I; Kofar Kansakali II; Kofar Kansakali III; Kofar Kansakali IV; Kofar Kabuga (Warure Primary School.) I; Kofar Kabuga (Warure Primary School.) II; Kofar Waika Waje; Kabuga, Primary School I; Kabuga, Primary School II; Kabuga, Primary School III; Kabuga, Primary School IV; Prison Ward I; Prison Ward II; Tudun Yola I; Tudun Yola II; Tudun Yola III; Unguwar Dabai I; Unguwar Dabai II; W. T. C. I; W. T. C. II
Gwale	Mandawari	Jingau I; Jingau II; Jingau III; Filin Kanfa Open Space I (Mandawari/ Dandago. Primary School I); Filin Kanfa Open Space II (Mandawari/ Dandago. Primary School II); Filin Kanfa Open Space III (Mandawari/ Dandago. Primary School III); Filin Kanfa Open Space IV (Mandawari/ Dandago. Primary School IV); Filin Kanfa Open Space V (Mandawari/ Dandago. Primary School V); Mandawari Islamiyya School I; Mandawari Islamiyya School II; Mandawari Islamiyya School III; Mandawari Islamiyya School IV; Mandawari Islamiyya School V; Mandawari Islamiyya School VI; Mandawari Islamiyya School VII; Sabon Sara Public Building (Sabon Sara I); Sabon Sara II; Sabon Sara III; Sabon Sara IV; Sabon Sara V; Sabon Sara VI; Sabon Sara VII
Gwale	Sani Mai Magge	G. G. S. S. Sani Mai Nagge I; G. G. S. S. Sani Mai Nagge II; G. G. S. S. Sani Mai Nagge III; Maitasa Primary School I; Maitasa Primary School II; Maitasa Primary School III; Maitasa Primary School IV; Maitasa Primary School V; Rabiu Speaking Islamiyya Sch. I (Maitasa Primary School VI); Rabiu Speaking Islamiyya Sch. II (Maitasa Primary School VII); Rabiu Speaking Islamiyya Sch. III (Maitasa Primary School VIII); Mai Gadankaya Primary School IX; Mai Gadankaya Primary School X; Mai Gadankaya Primary School XI; Mai Gadankaya Primary School XII; Mai Gadankaya Primary School XIII; Filin Bayan Makarantar Open Space (Mai Gadankaya Primary School XIV); Ofishin Hakimi I; Ofishin Hakimi II; Open The Ater; Sani Mainagge, Primary School I; Sani Mainagge, Primary School II; Sani Mainagge, Primary School III; Sani Mainagge, Primary School IV; Sani Mainagge, Primary School V; Sani Mainagge, Primary School VI; Sani Mainagge, Primary School VII; Sani Mainagge, Primary School VIII; Shehu Maihula, Islamiyya School I; Shehu Maihula, Islamiyya School II
Gwarzo	Getso	Damunawa; Karkari; Kauyenbako; Kofarfada I; Kofarfada II; Kofarfada III; Kofarfada IV; Sabangarin Kayyu I; Sabangarin Kayyu II; Unguwan Fulani I; Unguwan Fulani II; Yagwamawa I; Yagwamawa II; Zango I; Zango II
Gwarzo	Gwarzo	Biremawa Fulani I/K/Gidan Alhaji Zakari Street (Biremawa Fulani I); Biremawa Fulani II/K/Gidan Alhaji Zakari Street (Biremawa Fulani II); Biremawa Masaka I; Biremawa Masaka II; Biremawa Masaka III; Biremawa Waje I; Biremawa Waje II; Biremawa Waje III; Biremawa Waje IV; Kawuri I; Kawuri II; Kawuri III; Kawuri IV; Katanbawa I; Katanbawa II; Kofar Fada I; Kofar Fada II; Kofar Fada III; Kofar Fada IV; Tsohon Garu I; Tsohon Garu II; Tsohon Garu III
Gwarzo	Jama' A	Badari; Jama'A I; Jama'A II; Malamawa I; Malamawa II; Tsamiya /K/Gidan Alhaji Ado Street (Tsamiya); Yammawa /Yammawa Masallaci Street (Yammawa)
Gwarzo	Kara	Batarawa I; Batarawa II; Dalangashi I; Dogami; Kanawa; Koya; Munawa; Sabonlayi I; Sabonlayi II; Unguwar Naibi I; Unguwar Naibi II
Gwarzo	Kutama	Fada/ G/Limamin Gari Street (Fada); Kafi; Kasarbawa /G/Alh Yusif Street (Kasarbawa); Kafindakwara/Gidan Mai Unguwa Street (Kafindakwara); Rafawa I; Rafawa II; Riga; Rigar-Waje I; Rigar-Waje II; Saulawa I/K/Gidan Dagaci Street (Saulawa I); Saulawa II; Shemawa I; Shemawa II; Unguwar Marke; Zango I/Gidan Dagaci Street (Zango I); Zango Ll/G/Sharu (Zango II)
Gwarzo	Lakwaya	Dugumawa I; Dugumawa II; Kankanin Yama I; Kankanin Yama II; Kanyar Gurgu I; Kanyar Gurgu II; Kanyar Gurgu III; Kogonkura I; Kogonkura II; Lakwaya I; Lakwaya II; Lakwaya III; Makera; Nakuku; Rijigan Gare I; Rijigan Gare II; Rugoji I; Rugoji II; Salihawa; Unguwartsauni I; Unguwartsauni II
Gwarzo	Madadi	Janbarde I; Janbarde II; Kutunbuli; Madadi; Makanwata I; Makanwata II; Marori; Moda; Yanguruza; Yanbashi; Yaunake; Zanginawa
Gwarzo	Mainika	Jaga I; Katata; Mainika I; Mainika II; Nassarawa I; Nassarawa II; Unguwar Zuwo; Zangarmawa I; Zangarmawa II
Gwarzo	Sabon Birni	Bagwayawa; Dankado I; Dankado II; Dantasau; Jandimo; Maauni I; Maauni II; Sabon Birni; Tumfafi; Zanginawa
Gwarzo	Unguwar Tudu	Dadarau I; Dadarau II; Dorogo; Katsira I; Katsira II; Kaura; Kwami I; Kwami II; Mahuta; Makada; Unguwar-Tudu I; Unguwar-Tudu II
Kabo	Dugabau	Agalawa; Barigaji; Damawa I; Damawa II; Idore; Jama'A; Korenmaje; Larawa; Rigarisau; Rinjin Duna; Unguwar Kure; Unguwar Turaki; Dalawa; Zango
Kabo	Durun	Gabasawa; Kacure; Kalankasa/ Alami; Kanwa/ Zango I; Kanwa/ Zango II; Kanwa/ Zango III; Sharifai; Shabaiwa; Shadau/ Bantal I; Shadau/ Bantal II; Shadau/ Bantal III
Kabo	Gammo	Barnawa; Bujawa I; Bujawa II; Danmaliki; Falgore; Gwadabe/Dukawa; Gwaneji; Katsalle/Sabaru; Malikawa I; Malikawa II; Kauyere; Rigar Jawo; Rigar Mado; Rinjin Yadi; Sarkin Ya; Tsamaimai
Kabo	Garo	Al Kalawa I; Al Kalawa II; Al Kalawa III; Danja; Danja Kwari; Durun I; Durun II; Durun III; Gadagau; Garo I; Audun Garo Pri. Sch. I (Garo II); Audun Garo Pri. Sch. II (Garo - Garin Aifa); Gidan Zume I; Garo III; Gidan Zume II; Kanye I; Kanye II; Kanyar Waja; Sari Girin; Sariyirin/ Yumbu
Kabo	Godiya	Balan I; Balan II; Boroji I; Boroji II; F/Maikarfi/F/Mato; Gozo I; Gozo II; Haske/ Alanko; Hawaye; Hayintudu/ Kauyere I; Hayintudu/ Kauyere II; Kuragu; Nasarawa; T/Lafiya; Wari; Warija Warija; Wutsawa I; Wutsawa II; Wutsawar Makama; Yansarki/ Kwalwa I; Yansarki/ Kwalwa II
Kabo	Hauwade	Baawa; Bango; Buta; Gagayawa; Galadanchi I; Galadanchi II; Gashi; Gatta; Gyarauji; Majema; Unguwar Kwari
Kabo	Kabo	Gyarauji; Karangiyar Gammo; Karangiyar Sati; Kauyen Mahauta; Kibabal I; Kibabal II; Kwari I; Kwari II; Kwari III; Limanci I; Limanci II; Limanci III; Mallam Gajere I; Mallam Gajere II; Kabo Model Pri. Sch. I (Nasarawa I); Kabo Model Pri. Sch. II (Nasarawa II); Rakwancan; Rinjin Maikaho; Sabuwar Unguwa I; Sabuwar Unguwa II; Tabo; Tukwibi; Unguwar Fulani I; Unguwar Fulani II
Kabo	Masanawa	Kanawa; Kasawa I; Kasawa II; Madaha I; Madaha II; Masanawa I; Masanawa II; Rigar Shiba; Unguwar Kwaari; Zango/Bakinrafi
Kano Municipal	Chedi	Alkantara, Filin Alkantara I; Alkantara, Filin Alkantara II; Alkantara, Filin Alkantara III; Alkantara, Filin Alkantara IV; Chedi Filin Alkantara I; Chedi Filin Alkantara II; Chedi Filin Alkantara III; Chedi Filin Alkantara IV; Chiromawa Filin Wanki; Chiromawa Filin Wanki II; Chiromawa Filin Wanki III; Darma, Yolawa Islamiyya I; Darma, Yolawa Islamiyya II; Darma, Yolawa Islamiyya III; Darma, Yolawa Islamiyya IV; Darma, Yolawa Islamiyya V; Darma, Yolawa Islamiyya VI; Darma, Yolawa Islamiyya VII
Kano Municipal	Dan'Agundi	Dan'Agundi S. P. S I (Dan'Agundi I); Dan'Agundi S. P. S II (Dan'Agundi II); Dan'Agundi S. P. S III (Dan'Agundi III); Dan'Agundi S. P. S IV (Dan'Agundi IV); Dan'Agundi S. P. S V (Dan'Agundi V); Dan'Agundi S. P. S VI (Dan'Agundi VI); Dan'Agundi S. P. S VII (Dan'Agundi VII); Dan'Agundi S. P. S VIII (Dan'Agundi VIII); Dan'Agundi S. P. S IX (Dan'Agundi IX); Ado Bayero Islamiyya I (Indabawa I); Ado Bayero Islamiyya II (Indabawa II); Ado Bayero Islamiyya III (Indabawa III); Ado Bayero Islamiyya IV (Indabawa IV); Ado Bayero Islamiyya V (Indabawa V); Ado Bayero Islamiyya VI (Indabawa VI); Ado Bayero Islamiyya VII (Indabawa VII); Ado Bayero Islamiyya VIII (Indabawa VIII); Wasila Islaimiyya I (Kurmawa I); Wasila Islaimiyya II (Kurmawa II); Wasila Islaimiyya III (Kurmawa III); Wasila Islaimiyya IV (Kurmawa IV); Wasila Islaimiyya V (Kurmawa V); Wasila Islaimiyya VI (Kurmawa VI); Wasila Islaimiyya VII (Kurmawa VII); Kurmawa VIII/Wasila Islaimiyya (Kurmawa VIII)
Kano Municipal	Gandun Albasa	Gandu S. P. S. I (Gandun Albasa I); Gandu S. P. S. II (Gandun Albasa II); Gandu S. P. S. III (Gandun Albasa III); Gandu S. P. S. IV (Gandun Albasa IV); Gandu S. P. S. V (Gandun Albasa V); Gandu S. P. S. VI (Gandun Albasa VI); Gandu S. P. S. VII (Gandun Albasa VII); Gandu S. P. S. VIII (Gandun Albasa VIII); Gandu S. P. S. IX (Gandun Albasa IX); Gandu S. P. S. X (Gandun Albasa X); G. G. J. S. S Gandu Albasa I (Gandun Albasa XI); G. G. J. S. S Gandu Albasa II (Gandun Albasa XII); G. G. J. S. S Gandu Albasa III (Gandun Albasa XIII); G. G. J. S. S Gandu Albasa IV (Gandun Albasa XIV); G. G. J. S. S Gandu Albasa V (Gandun Albasa XV); G. G. J. S. S Gandu Albasa VI (Gandun Albasa XVI); G. G. J. S. S Gandu Albasa VII (Gandun Albasa XVII); Gandu P. S. I; Gandu P. S. II; Gandu P. S. III; Gandu P. S. IV; Mini Market I; Mini Market II; Mini Market III; Mini Market IV; Mini Market V; Mini Market VI; Mini Market VII; Mini Market VIII; Mini Market IX; Rumfa College I; Rumfa College II; Rumfa College III
Kano Municipal	Jakara	Filing Bakin Zuwo I (Bakinzuwo K/Gidan M/Unguwa I); Filing Bakin Zuwo II (Bakinzuwo K/Gidan M/Unguwa II); Filing Bakin Zuwo III (Bakinzuwo K/Gidan M/Unguwa III); Filing Bakin Zuwo IV (Bakinzuwo K/Gidan M/Unguwa IV); Danbazau, Danbazau Islamiyya I; Danbazau, Danbazau Islamiyya II; Danbazau, Danbazau Islamiyya III; Durumin Arbabi - K/Gidan M/Unguwa I; Durumin Arbabi - K/Gidan M/Unguwa II; Durumin Arbabi - K/Gidan M/Unguwa III; Jujin Yanlabu, Danbazau Islamiyya I; Jujin Yanlabu, Danbazau Islamiyya II; Kwarin Mabuga - Kotun Kasuwa I; Kwarin Mabuga - Kotun Kasuwa II; Kwarin Mabuga - Kotun Kasuwa III; Jakara Hospital V (Masu Kwani, Jakara Post Office I); Jakara Hospital I (Masu Kwani, Jakara Post Office II); Jakara Hospital II (Masu Kwani, Jakara Post Office III); Jakara Hospital III (Masu Kwani, Jakara Post Office IV); Jakara Hospital IV (Masu Kwani, Jakara Post Office V); Yandoya Filin, Yandoya I; Yandoya Filin, Yandoya II; Yandoya Filin, Yandoya III
Kano Municipal	Kankarofi	Dogarai G/Makama S. P. S. I; Dogarai G/Makama S. P. S. II; Durumin Zungura Women Centre I; Durumin Zungura Women Centre II; Durumin Zungura Women Centre III; Durumin Zungura Women Centre IV; Durumin Zungura Women Centre V; Durumin Zungura Women Centre VI; Kankarofi Quranic Sch. I; Kankarofi Quranic Sch. II; Kankarofi Quranic Sch. III; Kankarofi Quranic Sch. IV; Kankarofi Quranic Sch. V; Kankarofi Quranic Sch. VI; Kofar Nassarawa N. A. Garden I; Kofar Nassarawa N. A. Garden II; Kofar Nassarawa N. A. Garden III; Kofar Nassarawa N. A. Garden IV; Kofar Nassarawa N. A. Garden V; Kofar Nassarawa N. A. Garden VI; Kofar Nassarawa N. A. Garden VII; G. G. S. S. Hasana Sufi I (Kofar Nassarawa N. A. Garden VIII); G. G. S. S. Hasana Sufi II (Kofar Nassarawa N. A. Garden IX); G. G. S. S. Hasana Sufi III (Kofar Nassarawa N. A. Garden X); G. G. S. S. Hasana Sufi IV (Kofar Nassarawa N. A. Garden XI); G. G. S. S. Hasana Sufi V (Kofar Nassarawa N. A. Garden XII); G. G. S. S. Hasana Sufi VI (Kofar Nassarawa N. A. Garden XIII); G. G. S. S. Hasana Sufi VII (Kofar Nassarawa N. A. Garden XIV); Mubi Kwalli S. P. S. I; Mubi Kwalli S. P. S. II; Mubi Kwalli S. P. S. III; Mubi Kwalli S. P. S. IV; Mubi Kwalli S. P. S. V; Mubi Kwalli S. P. S. VI; Mubi Kwalli S. P. S. VII; School Arabic Studies I (Unguwar Gini, Filin Kwalli I); School Arabic Studies II (Unguwar Gini, Filin Kwalli II); School Arabic Studies III (Unguwar Gini, Filin Kwalli III); School Arabic Studies IV (Unguwar Gini, Filin Kwalli IV); School Arabic Studies V (Unguwar Gini, Filin Kwalli V); School Arabic Studies VI (Unguwar Gini, Filin Kwalli VI); School Arabic Studies VII (Unguwar Gini, Filin Kwalli VII); School Arabic Studies VIII (Unguwar Gini, Filin Kwalli VIII); Watatazo Dispensiry I (Unguwar Gini, Filin Kwalli IX); Watatazo Dispensiry II (Unguwar Gini, Filin Kwalli X); Watatazo Dispensiry III (Unguwar Gini, Filin Kwalli XI); Watatazo Dispensiry IV (Unguwar Gini, Filin Kwalli XII); Watatazo Dispensiry V (Unguwar Gini, Filin Kwalli XIII); Wudilawa G/Makama S. P. S. I; Wudilawa G/Makama S. P. S. II; Wudilawa G/Makama S. P. S. III; Wudilawa G/Makama S. P. S. IV; Wudilawa G/Makama S. P. S. V; Central Prison I; Central Prison II; Central Prison III
Kano Municipal	Shahuchi	Bb Talle Islamiyya I (Agadasawa I); Bb Talle Islamiyya II (Agadasawa II); Bb Talle Islamiyya III (Agadasawa III); Bb Talle Islamiyya IV (Agadasawa IV); Ado Yola S. P. S I (Cediyar Kuda I); Ado Yola S. P. S II (Cediyar Kuda II); Sheik Musa Ali Islam. I (Gabari I); Sheik Musa Ali Islam. II (Gabari II); Sheik Musa Ali Islam. III (Gabari III); Festival S. P. S. I (Kofar Wambai I); Festival S. P. S. II (Kofar Wambai II); Festival S. P. S. III (Kofar Wambai III); Festival S. P. S. IV (Kofar Wambai IV); Festival S. P. S. V (Kofar Wambai V); Festival S. P. S. VI (Kofar Wambai VI); Festival S. P. S. VII (Kofar Wambai VII); Festival S. P. S. VIII (Kofar Wambai VIII); Festival S. P. S. IX (Kofar Wambai IX); Filing Kurawa I (Kurawa I); Filing Kurawa II (Kurawa II); Filing Kurawa III (Kurawa III); Filing Kurawa IV (Kurawa IV); Ado Yola S. P. S I (Kurna I); Ado Yola S. P. S II (Kurna II); Ado Yola S. P. S III (Kurna III); Ado Yola S. P. S IV (Kurna IV); Makafin K/Wambai; Satatima I; Satatima II; Satatima III; Satatima IV; Madaras Q. Walaulad I (Sharfadi I); Madaras Q. Walaulad II (Sharfadi II); Madaras Q. Walaulad III (Sharfadi III); Madaras Q. Walaulad IV (Sharfadi IV); Madaras Q. Walaulad V (Sharfadi V); Madaras Q. Walaulad VI (Sharfadi VI); Sharifai I; Sharifai II; Sharifai III; Sharifai IV; Sharifai V; Sharifai VI; Yola Islamiyya I (Yola I); Yola Islamiyya II (Yola II); Yola Islamiyya III (Yola III); Yola Islamiyya IV (Yola IV); Yola Islamiyya V (Yola V)
Kano Municipal	Sharada	Hudaybiyya Islamiyya I; Hudaybiyya Islamiyya II; Hudaybiyya Islamiyya III; Hudaybiyya Islamiyya IV; Kabiru Kiru Islamiyya I; Kabiru Kiru Islamiyya II; Kabiru Kiru Islamiyya III; Kabiru Kiru Islamiyya IV; Salanta S. P. S I (Salanta I); Salanta S. P. S II (Salanta II); Salanta S. P. S III (Salanta III); Salanta S. P. S IV (Salanta IV); Salanta S. P. S V (Salanta V); Salanta S. P. S VI (Salanta VI); Salanta S. P. S VII (Salanta VII); Salanta S. P. S VIII (Salantaviii); Salanta S. P. S IX (Salanta IX); Salanta S. P. S X (Salanta X); Salanta S. P. S XI (Salanta XI); Salanta S. P. S XII (Salanta XII); Salanta S. P. S XIII (Salanta XIII); Salanta S. P. S XIV (Salanta XIV); Salanta S. P. S XV (Salanta XV); Salanta S. P. S XVI (Salanta XVI); Tukuntawa S. P. S I (Tukuntawa I); Tukuntawa S. P. S II (Tukuntawa II); Tukuntawa S. P. S III (Tukuntawa III); Tukuntawa S. P. S IV (Tukuntawa IV); Tukuntawa S. P. S V (Tukuntawa V); Tukuntawa S. P. S VI (Tukuntawa VI); Tukuntawa S. P. S VII (Tukuntawa VII); Tukuntawa S. P. S VIII (Tukuntawa VIII); Tukuntawa S. P. S IX (Tukuntawa IX); Tukuntawa S. P. S X (Tukuntawa X); Tukuntawa G/Radio I (Tukuntawa XI); Tukuntawa G/Radio II (Tukuntawa XII); Tukuntawa G/Radio III (Tukuntawa XIII); Tukuntawa G/Radio IV (Tukuntawa XIV); Tukuntawa G/Radio V (Tukuntawa XV)
Kano Municipal	Sheshe	Mal. Kamalu Islamiyya I (Alfindiki I); Mal. Kamalu Islamiyya II (Alfindiki II); Mal. Kamalu Islamiyya III (Alfindiki III); Mal. Kamalu Islamiyya IV (Alfindiki IV); Tahfiz Islamiyya Gulbi I (Daneji I); Tahfiz Islamiyya Gulbi II (Daneji II); Tahfiz Islamiyya Gulbi III (Daneji III); Tahfiz Islamiyya Gulbi IV (Daneji IV); Tahfiz Islamiyya Gulbi V (Daneji V); Tahfiz Islamiyya Gulbi VI (Daneji VI); Kududdufawa I; Kududdufawa II; Kududdufawa III; Kududdufawa IV; Kududdufawa V; Abubkar Sadiq J. S. S I (Kalina I); Abubkar Sadiq J. S. S II (Kalina II); Abubkar Sadiq J. S. S III (Kalina III); Abubkar Sadiq J. S. S IV (Kalina IV); Marmara Comm. Sch. I (Marmara I); Marmara Comm. Sch. II (Marmara II); Marmara Comm. Sch. III (Marmara III); Marmara Comm. Sch. IV (Marmara IV); Maigari Islamiyya I (Sheshe I); Maigari Islamiyya II (Sheshe II); Maigari Islamiyya III (Sheshe III); Maigari Islamiyya IV (Sheshe IV); Maigari Islamiyya V (Sheshe V); Maigari Islamiyya VI (Sheshe VI); Hasiya Bayero J. S. S I (Soron Dinki I); Hasiya Bayero J. S. S II (Soron Dinki II); Hasiya Bayero J. S. S III (Soron Dinki III); Hasiya Bayero J. S. S IV (Soron Dinki IV); Hasiya Bayero J. S. S V (Soron Dinki V); Hasiya Bayero J. S. S VI (Soron Dinki VI); Hasiya Bayero J. S. S VII (Soron Dinki VII); Nurul Quranic Isl. I (Soron Dinki VIII); Nurul Quranic Isl. II (Soron Dinki IX); Nurul Quranic Isl. III (Soron Dinki X); Nurul Quranic Isl. IV (Soron Dinki XI); Nurul Quranic Isl. V (Soron Dinki XII); Yanmuruchi Isl. I (Soron Dinki XIII); Yanmuruchi Isl. II (Soron Dinki XIV); Yanmuruchi Isl. III (Soron Dinki XV)
Kano Municipal	Tudun Nufawa	Mazan Kwarai I; Mazan Kwarai II; Mazan Kwarai III; Takalmawa I; Takalmawa II; Takalmawa III; Tudun Nufawa I; Tudun Nufawa II; Tudun Nufawa III; Tudun Wada I; Tudun Wada II; Yanmuruchi I; Yanmuruchi II; Yanmuruchi III; Zangon Bare Bari I; Zangon Bare Bari II; Zangon Bare Bari III; Zangon Bare Bari IV; Zangon Bare Bari V; Zangon Bare Bari VI
Kano Municipal	Tudun Wazirchi	Gwangwazo Filin Gwangwazo I; Gwangwazo Filin Gwangwazo II; Gwangwazo Filin Gwangwazo III; Gwangwazo Filin Gwangwazo IV; Kofar Kudu Pri. Sch. III (Kofar Kudu Filin K/Kudu III); Gwangwazo Filin Gwangwazo VI; Gwangwazo Filin Gwangwazo VII; Gwangwazo Filin Gwangwazo VIII; Gwangwazo Filin Gwangwazo IX; Gwangwazo Filin Gwangwazo X; Kabara Jarkasa S. P. S. I; Kabara Jarkasa S. P. S. II; Kabara Jarkasa S. P. S. III; Kabara Jarkasa S. P. S. IV; Kabara Jarkasa S. P. S. V; Kabara Jarkasa S. P. S. VI; Kabara Jarkasa S. P. S. VII; Kabara Jarkasa S. P. S. VIII; Kabara Jarkasa S. P. S. IX; Kabara Jarkasa S. P. S. X; Kofar Kudu Pri. Sch. I (Kofar Kudu Filin K/Kudu); Kofar Kudu Pri. Sch. II (Kofar Kudu Filin K/Kudu II); Kofar Kwaru Islamiyya I (Kofar Kwaru K/Kwaru I); Kofar Kwaru Islamiyya II (Kofar Kwaru K/Kwaru II); Filing Kusurwa I (Sagagi Filin Gidan Wambai); Filing Kusurwa II (Sagagi Filin Gidan Wambai II); Filing Kusurwa III (Sagagi Filin Gidan Wambai III); Filing Kusurwa IV (Sagagi Filin Gidan Wambai IV); Tudun Wazirchi Filin K/Kudu I; Tudun Wazirchi Filin K/Kudu II; Tudun Wazirchi Filin K/Kudu III; Tudun Wazirchi Filin K/Kudu IV; Tudun Wazirchi Filin K/Kudu V; Tudun Wazirchi Filin K/Kudu VI; Tudun Wazirchi Filin K/Kudu VII
Kano Municipal	Yakasai	Yakasai 'A' Yakasai S. P. S. I; Yakasai 'A' Yakasai S. P. S. II; Yakasai 'A' Yakasai S. P. S. III; Yakasai 'A' Yakasai S. P. S. IV; Yakasai 'A' Yakasai S. P. S. V; Yakasai 'A' Yakasai S. P. S. VI; Yakasai 'A' Yakasai S. P. S. VII; Yakasai 'A' Yakasai S. P. S. VIII; Yakasai 'A' Yakasai S. P. S. IX; Yakasai 'A' Yakasai S. P. S. X; G. G. S. S. Yakasai I (Yakasai 'A' Yakasai S. P. S. XI); G. G. S. S. Yakasai II (Yakasai 'A' Yakasai S. P. S. XII); G. G. S. S. Yakasai III (Yakasai 'A' Yakasai S. P. S. XIII); G. G. S. S. Yakasai IV (Yakasai 'A' Yakasai S. P. S. XIV); Yakasai 'A' Shahucii S. P. S. I; Yakasai 'A' Shahucii S. P. S. II; Yakasai 'A' Shahucii S. P. S. III; Yakasai 'A' Shahucii S. P. S. IV; Yakasai 'A' Shahucii S. P. S. V; Yakasai 'A' Shahucii S. P. S. VI; Yakasai 'A' Shahucii S. P. S. VII; G. G. S. S. Yakasai V (Yakasai 'A' Shahucii S. P. S. VIII); G. G. S. S. Yakasai VI (Yakasai 'A' Shahucii S. P. S. IX); G. G. S. S. Yakasai VII (Yakasai 'A' Shahucii S. P. S. X); G. G. S. S. Sheikara I (Yakasai 'B' G. G. S. S. Shekara I); G. G. S. S. Sheikara II (Yakasai 'B' G. G. S. S. Shekara II); G. G. S. S. Sheikara III (Yakasai 'B' G. G. S. S. Shekara III); G. G. S. S. Sheikara IV (Yakasai 'B' G. G. S. S. Shekara IV); G. G. S. S. Sheikara V (Yakasai 'B' G. G. S. S. Shekara V); G. G. S. S. Sheikara VI (Yakasai 'B' G. G. S. S. Shekara VI); G. G. S. S. Sheikara VII (Yakasai 'B' G. G. S. S. Shekara VII); G. G. S. S. Sheikara VIII (Yakasai 'B' G. G. S. S. Shekara VIII); G. G. S. S. Sheikara IX (Yakasai 'B' G. G. S. S. Shekara IX); G. G. S. S. Sheikara X (Yakasai 'B' G. G. S. S. Shekara X); G. S. S. S. Rimi City I (Yakasai 'B' G. G. S. S. Shekara XI); G. S. S. S. Rimi City II (Yakasai 'B' G. G. S. S. Shekara XII); G. S. S. S. Rimi City III (Yakasai 'B' G. G. S. S. Shekara XIII); G. S. S. S. Rimi City IV (Yakasai 'B' G. G. S. S. Shekara XIV); Yakasai 'B'Rimi City S. P. S. I; Yakasai 'B'Rimi City S. P. S. II; Yakasai 'B'Rimi City S. P. S. III; Yakasai 'B'Rimi City S. P. S. IV; Yakasai 'B'Rimi City S. P. S. V; Yakasai 'B'Rimi City S. P. S. VI; Yakasai 'B'Rimi City S. P. S. VII; Yakasai 'B'Rimi City S. P. S. VIII; Yakasai 'B'Rimi City S. P. S. IX
Kano Municipal	Zaitawa	Dukawa Yan'Awaki S. P. S. I; Dukawa Yan'Awaki S. P. S. II; Dukawa Yan'Awaki S. P. S. III; Dukawa Yan'Awaki S. P. S. IV; Koki Mayanka S. P. S. I; Koki Mayanka S. P. S. II; Koki Mayanka S. P. S. III; Koki Mayanka S. P. S. IV; Koki Mayanka S. P. S. V; Koki Mayanka S. P. S. VI; Koki Mayanka S. P. S. VII; Koki Mayanka S. P. S. VIII; Koki Mayanka S. P. S. IX; Koki Mayanka S. P. S. X; Koki Mayanka S. P. S. XI; Koki Mayanka S. P. S. XII; Koki Mayanka S. P. S. XIII; Koki Mayanka S. P. S. XIV; Koki Mayanka S. P. S. XV; Malam Ganari Yan'Awaki S. P. S I; Malam Ganari Yan'Awaki S. P. S II; Malam Ganari Yan'Awaki S. P. S III; Malam Ganari Yan'Awaki S. P. S IV; Yan'Awaki Yan'Awaki S. P. S I; Yan'Awaki Yan'Awaki S. P. S II; G. G. S. S Ummu Zaria I (Yan'Awaki Yan'Awaki S. P. S III); G. G. S. S Ummu Zaria II (Yan'Awaki Yan'Awaki S. P. S IV); G. G. S. S Ummu Zaria III (Yan'Awaki Yan'Awaki S. P. S V); G. G. S. S Ummu Zaria IV (Yan'Awaki Yan'Awaki S. P. S VI); G. G. S. S Ummu Zaria V (Zaitawa Yan'Awaki S. P. S. I); G. G. S. S Ummu Zaria VI (Zaitawa Yan'Awaki S. P. S. II); G. G. S. S Ummu Zaria VII (Zaitawa Yan'Awaki S. P. S. III); G. G. S. S Ummu Zaria VIII (Zaitawa Yan'Awaki S. P. S. IV); G. G. S. S Ummu Zaria IX (Zaitawa Yan'Awaki S. P. S. V); G. G. S. S Ummu Zaria X (Zaitawa Yan'Awaki S. P. S. VI)
Karaye	Daura	Alfawa; Bauni; Daura I; Daura II; Daura Kwari; Daura Sako; Gatarawa; Gyatumawa; Jaji; Jumawa; Makera Bauni I; Makera Bauni II; Naturbe; Unguwar Tofa; Yammawa
Karaye	Kafin Dafga	Dausawa; Jambawa; Kafin Dafga I; Kafin Dafga II; Kawara; Matan Kari; Mundibo; Sauna; Tudun Jama'A; Usama; Zango
Karaye	Karaye	Chede I; Chede II; Chede III; Jamo I; Jamo II; Jamo III; Jamo IV; Na'Ibawa I; Na'Ibawa II; Na'Ibawa III; Na'Ibawa IV; Namaje I; Namaje II; Shitu I; Shitu II; Shitu III; Shitu IV; Zango I; Zango II; Zango III; Zango IV
Karaye	Kurugu	Dambazau I; Dambazau II; Dutsen Amare I; Dutsen Amare II; Jangero; Kumbugawa; Kurugu I; Kurugu II; Tumfafi; Tunkuyau; Unguwar Dagachi; Unguwar Dinya; Unguwar Sarki; Unguwar Jiri; Zango
Karaye	Kwanyawa	Danfarwa; Gurawa; Jakyankyan; Kadafa I; Kadafa II; Kadare I; Kadare II; Kwanyawa I; Kwanyawa II; Kwari; Maje; Muware; Sapele; Tamarke; Tunga; Unguwar Tofa I; Unguwar Tofa II; Unguwar Kosau; Yalwa; Yan'Turu; Zamfarawa
Karaye	Tudun Kaya	Dangayaki; Danzau I; Danzau II; Danzau III; Kafi Awo; Kogon Damisa; Nassarawa; Ramin Dankwami; Tudun Kaya I; Tudun Kaya II; Unguwar Malam Sani; Unguwar Karimi; Unguwar Zangi I; Unguwar Zangi II; Zangon Tudun-Kaya
Karaye	Unguwar Hajji	Jama'Ar Kosa; Kyari I; Kyari II; Tinkis; Unguwar Hajji I; Unguwar Hajji II; Unguwar Hajji III; Unguwar Hajji IV
Karaye	Yammedi	Audawa; Dederi I; Dederi II; Gidan Dabai; Kangarawa; Makerar Yammeda; Tsohuwar Karaye I; Tsohuwar Karaye II; Unguwar Madaki; Unguwar Kure; Unguwar Taiki; Walawa; Yammedi I; Yammedi II; Zango Makera
Kibiya	Durba	Central Primar School I/Durba Kofar Gari; Central Primar School II/Durba Cikin Gari; Central Primar School III/Durba Pri. School; Gidan Madugu; Galadachi; Cikin Gari; Sarari Primary School; Gidan Tagwai I; Gidan Tagwai II
Kibiya	Fammar	Babban Giji I; Babban Giji II/Goron Duste; Duku; Fancha Town; Fammar Primary School I; Fammar Primary School II; Randai Cikin Gari I; Randai Town II; Tabani Town I; Tabani Town II; Tarunu Town; Unguwar Kure
Kibiya	Fassi	Fassi Primary School I; Fassi Primary School II; Kalambu Town I; Kalambu Town II; Kibili Primary Sch. I; Kibili Primary Sch. II; Makaya K/Arewa; Makaya Ung/Fawa; Tsohon Asibiti (Saya-Saya Primary Sch. I); Saya-Saya Primary Sch. II; Saya-Saya Primary Sch. III; Tamaru I; Tamaru II; Tum Town
Kibiya	Kadigawa	Kadigawa C/Gari; Kadigawa K/Arewa Primary Sch.; Kadigawa K/Gabas Bare-Bare; Kadigana Busawa; Kadigawa Kuluki; Kadigawa Kayanga; Kadigawa Kuluki Kayanga; Kadigawa U/Jarmai
Kibiya	Kahu	Cabara; Falangai Town; Gurjiya Town; Kahu Cikin Gari I; Kahu Cikin Gari II; Sabon Garu Town; Shamage Town; Shike; Shike - Ginduwa; Tsirya Town; Ung/Fakai; Ung/Shike Primary School II; Shike Mai Gari
Kibiya	Kibiya I	Kibiya General Hospital I; Kibiya General Hospital II; Zango Islamiyya Pri. Sch. I (Kibiya General Hospital III); Zango Islamiyya Pri. Sch. II (Kibiya General Hospital IV); Kibiya Central Primary School I; Kibiya Central Primary School II; Kibiya Central Primary School III; Kibiya Ube Primary School I (Kibiya Central Primary School IV); Kibiya Ube Primary School II (Kibiya Central Primary School V); Kibiya Ube Primary School III (Kibiya Central Primary School VI); Kibiya Ube Primary School IV (Kibiya Central Primary School VII)
Kibiya	Kibiya II	J. S. S. Kibiya I; J. S. S. Kibiya II; J. S. S. Kibiya III; G. Jss Danjakalle I (J. S. S. Kibiya IV); G. Jss Danjakalle II (J. S. S. Kibiya V); G. Jss Danjakalle III (J. S. S. Kibiya VI); Kanfa Ung/Fagan; Rinji Town; Ung/Gunda Primary School I; Ung/Gunda Primary School II; Ung/Gunda Primary School III
Kibiya	Nariya	Bacha Primary School I; Bacha Primary School II; Bacha Town Mahada I; Bacha Town Mahada II; Chalbo Primary School I; Chalbo Primary School II; Fantin Town; Nariya Gangare I; Nariya Gangare II; Nariya Primary School I; Nariya Primary School II; Nariya Ung/Gorawa; Kesau
Kibiya	Tarai	Agiri Town I; Dadin Kowa I; Dadin Kowa II; Fancha Town I; Fancha Town II; Faran Hayin-Halilu I; Faran Hayin-Halilu II; Tarai Kargo I; Tarai Kargo II; Tarai Town K/Arewa I; Arewa Islamiyya Pri. Sch. I (Tarai Town K/Arewa II); Central Islamiyya Pri. Sch. I (Tarai Town K/Kudu I); Arewa Islamiyya Pri. Sch. II (Tarai Town K/Kudu II); Central Islamiyya Pri. Sch. II (Tarai Kofar Gabas); Central Islamiyya Pri. Sch. III (Tarai Primary School)
Kibiya	Unguwar Gai	Dunkuran Durba I; Dunkuran Durba II; Gaudawa Town I; Gaudawa Town II; Ingini Primary School I; Ingini Primary School II; Kundu Town; Ung/Madaki Town I; Ung/Madaki Town II; Kankaro; Ung/Gai Primary School I; Ung/Kundu; Ung/Gai Primary School II
Kiru	Ba'Awa	Ba'Awa Cikin Gari I; Ba'Awa Cikin Garin II; Ba'Awa Cikin Garin III; Dinka; Hayin Wada; Kankan I; Kankan II; Karimawa; Kotoko; Kuriwa; Maska, C/Gari; Sankarma, C/Gari I; Sankarma, C/Gari II; Sabon Garin, Sankarma; Ung/Dodo; Unguwar Sha; Ung/Zango
Kiru	Badafi	Badafi, C/Garin; Badafi, Tsohowa I; Badafi, Tsohowa II; Dukku; Gajale I; Gajale II; Galadanci; Katsalle; Kwabe I; Kwabe II; Malikawa; Rawun I; Rawun II; Turame; Ung/ Barde; Ung /Haladu; Ung /Makera; Ung /Nagge; Ung /Sule; Watan Bakwai; Yar Ganji
Kiru	Bargoni	Achilafiya; Barde; Bargoni I; Bargoni II; Chikada; Dawaki I; Dawaki II; Farawa; Kaburi; Kadando I; Kadando II; Kadangaro, C/Gari I; Kadangaro, C/Gari II; Kailani; Larabawa; Rangas
Kiru	Bauda	Bauda Kudu; Bauda Tsakiya I; Bauda Tsakiya II; Bauda Yamma; Chiromawa; Ung /Makama
Kiru	Dangora	Baure I; Baure II; Dangora, C/Gari I; Dangora, C/Gari II; Dangora, C/Gari III; Kuidawa; Kyarana I; Kyarana II
Kiru	Dansohiya	Dansoshiya I; Dansoshiya II; Gabari I; Gabari II; Jedi; Kare Goma; Mai Dalla; Ung/. Dikko
Kiru	Dashi	Dashi, C/Gari I; Dashi, C/Gari II; Dashi, Tsakiya; Gunki; Gurarraji
Kiru	Kiru	Buremawa I; Buremawa II; Cikin Gari I; Cikin Gari II; Cikin Gari III; Cikin Gari IV; Cikin Gari V; Cikin Gari VI; Darbo; Gazan I; Gazan II; Gidan Hakimi I; Gidan Hakimi II; Gidan Hakimi III; Islamiyya I; Islamiyya II; Islamiyya III; Kadauje I; Kadauje II; Katsinawa I; Katsinawa II; Katsinawa III; Katsinawa IV; Katsinawa V; Katsinawa VI; Natare Gabas I; Natare Gabas II; Turakanci
Kiru	Kogo	Dan-Riga; Daurawa I; Daurawa II; Daurawa III; Gidan Dauda I; Gidan Dauda II; Kogo C/Gari I; Kogo C/Gari II; Kwasam; Turakanci; Ung /Dutse
Kiru	Tsaudawa	Babedawa; Lamin Kwai; Tsaudawa C/Gari I; Tsaudawa C/Gari II; Unguwar/ Maza
Kiru	Yako	Dukawa; Kamfatau; Tunkarawa; Unguwar Bature; Unguwar Maza; Tsamiyar Shwara; Yako C/Gari I; Yako C/Gari II; Yako C/Gari III; Yako C/Gari IV; Yako Kudu I; Yako Kudu II; Yako Kudu III
Kiru	Zuwo	Danashina; Fagoji I; Fagoji II; Unguwar Garba I; Unguwar Garba II; Unguwar Ganji I; Unguwar Ganji II; Yan Gyara; Zuwo Cikin Gari I; Zuwo Cikin Gari II; Zuwo Cikin Gari III
Kiru	Yalwa	Kafin Maiyaki; Kafin Maiyaki I; Kafin Maiyaki II; Kafin Maiyaki III; Kafin Maiyaki Cikin Gari I; Kafin Maiyaki Cikin Gari II; Kafin Maiyaki Magistrate I; Kafin Maiyaki Magistrate II; Kafin Maiyaki Magistrate III; Kafin Maiyaki Clinic I; Kafin Maiyaki Clinic II; Kayarda I; Kayarda II; Tudu Doka; Yalwa Cikin Gari I; Yalwa Cikin Gari II; Yalwa Cikin Gari III; Kariya Pri Sch; Sabuwar Abuja I; Sabuwar Abuja II; G G A S S Kafin Maiyaki I; G G A S S Kafin Maiyaki II; G G A S S Kafin Maiyaki III; G G A S S Kafin Maiyaki IV; G G A S S Kafin Maiyaki V; Kafin Mai Yaki IV; Kafin Mai Yaki V; Kafin Mai Yaki Cikin Gari III; Kafin Mai Yaki Cikin Gari IV; Unguwar Rimi Pri Sch I; Unguwar Rimi Pri Sch II; Unguwar Rimi Pri Sch III; G G A S S Kafin Maiyaki I (New); G G A S S Kafin Maiyaki II (New)
Kumbotso	Challawa	Challawa Primary School; Kusuba; Kuyan Ta Inna; Kuyan Tasidi; Marwan; Runkunsawa I; Rununsawa; Sara Islamiyya Sch. (Sara)
Kumbotso	Chiranchi	Chiranci Pri. School I; Chiranci Pri. School II; Chiranci Pri. School III; Chiranci Pri. School IV; Chiranci Pri. School V; Govt. Girls Sec. Sch Chiranchi I (Chiranci Pri. School VI); Govt. Girls Sec. Sch Chiranchi II (Chiranci Pri. School VII); Unguwar Kwari Pri. Sch. (Chiranci Pri. School VIII); Gidan Shanu Pri. Sch. (Chiranci Pri. School IX); Gaida Primary School I; Gaida Primary School II; Rinjin Wanzamai; Yankusa Primary School
Kumbotso	Danbare	Bakin Watari, Primary School; Danbare, Primary School I; Govt. Sec. Sch Danbare (Danbare, Primary School II); Danbare, Primary School III; Danjirinma; Gwazaye; Hawan Dawaki I; Hawan Dawaki II; Samegu I; Samegu II
Kumbotso	Danmaliki	Achilafiya; Batakaye Primary School; Bubbugaje Primary School I; Bubbugaje Primary School II; Danmaliki Primary School I; Danmaliki Primary School II; Danmaliki Primary School III; Gidan Kaji I; Gidan Kaji II; Medile Primary School I; Medile Primary School II; Rugar Kuka I; Rugar Kuka II; Sabuwar Gandu I; Sabuwar Gandu II; Shekar Maidaki I; Shekar Maidaki II; Sheka Primary School I; Sheka Primary School II; Sheka Primary School III; Sheka Primary School IV; Sheka Primary School V; Govt. Girls. Sec. Sch. Sheka I (Sheka Primary School VI); Govt. Girls. Sec. Sch. Sheka II (Sheka Primary School VII); Govt. Girls. Sec. Sch. Sheka III (Sheka Primary School VIII); Govt. Girls. Sec. Sch. Sheka IV (Sheka Primary School IX); Govt. Boys. Sec. Sch. Sheka I (Sheka Primary School X); Govt. Boys. Sec. Sch. Sheka II (Sheka Primary School XI); Govt. Boys. Sec. Sch. Sheka III (Sheka Primary School XII); Govt. Boys. Sec. Sch. Sheka IV (Sheka Primary School XIII); Govt. Boys. Sec. Sch. Sheka V (Sheka Primary School XIV); Govt. Boys. Sec. Sch. Sheka VI (Sheka Primary School XV)
Kumbotso	Guringawa	Bechi Primary School I; Bechi Primary School II; Bechi Primary School III; Guringawa Primary School I; Guringawa Primary School II; Guringawa Primary School III; Ja'Oji Primary School I; Ja'Oji Primary School II; Ja'Oji Primary School III; Model Pri. Sch. I (Ja'Oji Primary School IV); Ja'Oji Primary School V; Model Pri. Sch. II (Ja'Oji Primary School VI); Shagari Quarters I; Shagari Quarters II; Shagari Quarters III; Shagari Quarters IV; Tudun Maliki Primary School I; Tudun Maliki Primary School II; Tudun Maliki Primary School III; Tudun Maliki Primary School IV; Tudun Maliki Primary School V; Tudun Maliki Primary School VI; Tudun Maliki Primary School VII; Tudun Maliki Primary School VIII; Crown Quality Sec. Sch. I (Tudun Maliki Primary School IX); Crown Quality Sec. Sch. II (Tudun Maliki Primary School X); Crown Quality Sec. Sch. III (Tudun Maliki Primary School XI)
Kumbotso	Kumbotso	Gadama Primary School I; Gadama Primary School II; Now At Kumbotso Works Dept (Kaba); Kumbotso Primary School I; Kumbotso Primary School II; Kumbotso Primary School III; Kumbotso Primary School IV; Kumbotso Agric Dept. (Kumbotso Primary School V); Kumbotso Girls Sec. Sch. (Kumbotso Primary School VI); Ruga Fada Primary School; Tsamawa Pri. Sch ( Tsamawa )
Kumbotso	Kureken Sani	Kureken Sani Primary School; Magadawa; Magadawa I; Yanhamar; Yansango I; Yansango II; Yanshana I; Yanshana II
Kumbotso	Mariri	Gado; Gerawa; Dulo Yalwa (Farawa I); Farawa II; Mariri Primary School I; Mariri Primary School II; Mariri Primary School III; Mariri Primary School IV; Govt. Girls. Arabic. Sec. Sch. Mariri I (Mariri Primary School V); Govt. Girls. Arabic. Sec. Sch. Mariri II (Mariri Primary School VI); Govt. Girls. Arabic. Sec. Sch. Mariri III (Mariri Primary School VII); Tsamiya I; Tsamiya II; Tulku; Zera Primary School I; Zera Primary School II
Kumbotso	Na'Ibawa	College Of Education I; College Of Education II; Dangoro Primary School I; Dangoro Primary School II; Dotsa; Maikalwa Dispensary I; Maikalwa Dispensary II; Maikalwa Dispensary III; Maikalwa Pri. Sch. I (Maikalwa Dispensary IV); Maikalwa Pri. Sch. II (Maikalwa Dispensary V); Maikalwa Pri. Sch. III (Maikalwa Dispensary VI); Maikalwa Pri. Sch. IV (Maikalwa Dispensary VII); Maikalwa Pri. Sch. V (Maikalwa Dispensary VIII); Maikalwa Pri. Sch. VI (Maikalwa Dispensary IX); Na'Ibawa Primary School I; Na'Ibawa Primary School II; Na'Ibawa Primary School III; Na'Ibawa Primary School IV; Bala Bt Islamiyya I (Na'Ibawa Primary School V); Bala Bt Islamiyya II (Na'Ibawa Primary School VI); Nurul Anwar Islamiyya I (Na'Ibawa Primary School VII); Nurul Anwar Islamiyya II (Na'Ibawa Primary School VIII); Umarawa; Wailara Primary School I; Wailara Primary School II; Wailara Primary School III; Wailara Primary School IV; Wailara Primary School V; Waratallawa
Kumbotso	Panshekara	Darawa Open Space (Darawa); Gafiyawa Open Space (Gafiyawa); Gasau Kirimbo Open Space (Gasau Kirimbo); Nuruddeen Islamiyya Kamfani I (Kamfani I); Nuruddeen Islamiyya Kamfani II (Kamfani II); Nuruddeen Islamiyya Kamfani III (Kamfani III); Nuruddeen Islamiyya Kamfani IV (Kamfani IV); Nuruddeen Islamiyya Kamfani V (Kamfani V); Kwarin Kayi I; Kwarin Kayi II; Panshekara C/G Islamiyya I (Panshekara Cikin Gari I); Panshekara C/G Islamiyya II (Panshekara Cikin Gari II); Panshekara C/G Islamiyya III (Panshekara Cikin Gari III); Panshekara Primary School I; Panshekara Primary School II; Panshekara Primary School III; Panshekara Girls Sec. Sch. I (Panshekara Primary School IV); Panshekara Girls Sec. Sch. II (Panshekara Primary School V); Panshekara Girls Sec. Sch. III (Panshekara Primary School VI); Panshekara G S S (Police Academy); Yandanko; Zawaciki Dispensry I (Zawa/Ciki Cikin Gari I); Zawaciki Dispensry II (Zawa/Ciki Cikin Gari II); Zawaciki Pri. Sch. I (Zawa/Ciki Cikin Gari III); Zawaciki Pri. Sch. II (Zawa/Ciki Cikin Gari IV); Zawaciki Pri. Sch. III (Zawa/Ciki Cikin Gari V); Zawaciki Pri. Sch. IV (Zawa/Ciki Cikin Gari VI); Zawaciki Pri. Sch. V (Zawa/Ciki Cikin Gari VII); Zawaciki Girls Sec. Sch. (Zawa/Ciki Cikin Gari VIII)
Kunchi	Bumai	Bumai; Bumaim P. S.; Danjaka; Jangefe; Malamawa; Makolawa Cikin Gari; Makolawa; Samawa/Danjaka I; Samawa/Danjaka II; Ung/Gyartai; Ung/Gyartai II; Ung/Gyartai III; Ung/Gyartai IV
Kunchi	Garin Sheme	Belbelu Gari; Belbelu; Garin Sheme I; Garin Sheme II; Garin Sheme III; Garin Nisau; Garin Goga; Kesawa; Rijin-Yayi; Rigana Belbelu; Rigana Belbelu Tsadau; Yanruwata
Kunchi	Kasuwar Kuka	Dankwai Gari; Dan Totan; Dankwa Zango; Dishishi P. S.; Dishishi Gari; Gadango; Gadango Cikin Gari; Jodade; Jodade Dantotan; Jandutse; Katsinawa/Dan Totan; Kilkilawa/Chomolo; Kilkilawa; Madawa; Tirgalle; Tabanni; Tofawa; Ung/Rimi Cikin Gari
Kunchi	Kunchi	Dan Dakau Cikin Gari; Duku Cikin Gari; Kunchi C/Gari; Kunchi P. S. I; Kunchi P. S. II; Sodawa Gari; Sodawa P. S.; Sodawa Makaurata; Santarawa; Taura Tudu Nawala; Taura Idi; Taura Fulani
Kunchi	Matan Fada	Bashe I; Bashe II; Baraha; Barau; Daurawa I; Daurawa II; Falle Galadanchi; Gadaba Cikin Gari; Gadaba Bilau; Kaya C/Gari; Matan Fada C/Gari
Kunchi	Ridawa	Galadimawa; Gishare; Janhuwa; Kwari Hardu; Ridawa Kwari; Rigar Galadima; Ridawa Cikin Gari; Ridawa Gari
Kunchi	Shamakawa	Bargumawa; Baje Cikin Gari; Gwalaidada Primary School; Gwalaidada C/Gari; Kunyawa Gari; Kunyawa Pri. School; Ingawa; Makera; Shamaikawa Cikin Gari; Tangel/Tuwawa; Tanget Gari
Kunchi	Shuwaki	Dayawa; Daurawa/Yalwawa; Dumbule; Disga/Dumbule G.; Faure; Fagoho; Galadimawa C/Gari; Hugungumai I; Hugungumai II; Hugungumai III; Jigawa/Bulbula; Jarkuka; Kargo/Kunchi; Malamawa; Shadawa/Gerawa; Shuwaki Cikin Gari; Shuwaki Gari Pri. School; Ung/Gabas Pri. School; Ung/Gabas Gari
Kunchi	Yandadi	Dankwai; Karofawa; Kargon/Yandadi; Kunkyal Gari; Kunkyal Pri. School; Madaka Cikin Gari; Magawata Cikin Gari; Magawata I Pri. School; Magawata II Pri. School; Natsalle Gari; Natsalle Pri. School; Salihawa /K-Yandadi; Yankifi; Islamic Primary School (Yandadi Gari); Yandadi Pri. School
Kura	Dalili	Azoren Waje I; Azoren Waje II; Bauren Tanko; Dalili S/Gari; Fegin Danda I; Fegin Danda II; Fegin Danda III; Fegin Yawo; G. G. S. S. Kura; Gorubawa I; Gorubawa II; Gorubawa III`; Hadejia, Jama'Ar R. D& A.; Rakauna I; Rakauna II
Kura	Dan Hassan	Barde; Chiroma I; Chiroma II; Danga; Dokau; Gargari; Garin Kaya; Gwabare; Fegin Katsinawa (Kosawa); Makama Zango I; Makama Zango II; Makaurata; Islamiyya Pri. School (Muleka); Dandali (Ruku); Sawaika; Sintili; Sintilimagaji; Tofa Chiki; Tofa Zage Zagi; Turaki I; Turaki II; Unguwar Karofi; Tuka-Tuka (Yada Gungum)
Kura	Dukawa	Bawada; Chediya; Chiroma; Galadima Arewa; Gamadan Bakin Kasuwa; Gadaman Iyatawa; Gangare Chikin Gari; Gangare; Ganuwa; Gidan Zakar; Cikin Makaranta, Gidan Madaki I (Gidan Madaki I); Gidan Madaki II; Kuka; Rimi I; Rimi II; Ubakarawa; Unkuya; Unguwar Ali; Unguwar Kaya; Unguwar Liman; Makera Open Space (Unguwar Makera)
Kura	Gundutse	Dandali; Dandali II; Dandali III; Dandali IV; Dangwala; Gainawa; Kwari Dangana; Madaki; Nasarawan Gundutse I; Nasarawan Gundutse II; Riga; Rimi I; Rimi II; Rimi (Turaki); Zango
Kura	Karfi	Sabuwar Makaranta (Agalawa); Bawa; Bawa (Bawa Gangare); Baure Chiki; Kanya (Gidan Dan Kauye); Imawa I; Imawa II; Kankare (Kona I); Makera (Kona II); Kona III; Kwarin Dangana; Necco Camp; Gidan Sarki (Riga I); Cediya (Riga II); Baure (Unguwar Baure); Yakasai; Zango Gari; Zango
Kura	Kosawa	Agolas; Daune; Domawa; Fegin Malu; Gajin Giri I; Gajin Giri II; Imawa Arewa; Imawa Kudu; Kadan I; Kadani II; Kadani Sadauki I; Kadani Sadauki II; Kadani Chiki; Kosawa; Kosawa Bugau; Shinkafi; Unguwar Sarki
Kura	Kura	Alkalawa I; Alkalawa II; Alkalawa III; Dirimin Alewa; Kwarin Na Gwangwan I; Kwarin Na Gwangwan II; Limamai I; Limamai II; Moha; Nufawa I; Nufawa II; Rimin Daddo; Tsigai
Kura	Kurunsumau	Azoren Chikin I; Azoren Chikin II; Gwanjawa I; Gwanjawa II; Gwanjawa; Kadane I; Kadane II; Kurun Sumau; Kurun Sumau Auzinawa; Kurun Sumau Achiki; Kuri I; Kuri II; Kuri III; Rimi I; Rimi II; Rimi III; Sani Marshal; Tafasa I; Tafasa II; Takalma; Unguwar Gandu; Yalwa
Kura	Rigar Duka	Butalawa I; Butalawa II; Butalawa Bakin Kogi; Gawo Primary School (Gawo); Goda Islamiyya Pr. Sch. (Goda Kwari); Goda Tudu; Kawa; Kawa Gidan Mangwaro; Kawa Gidan Tsamiya; Kirya Kwari; Kirya Tudu I; Kirya Tudu II; Riga Duka; Rimin Kwarya
Kura	Tanawa	Ajuru I; Ajuru II; Dabino; Sumakai I; Sumakai II; Tanawa; Tukuba I; Tukuba II; Tukuba III; Unguwar Bugu; Unguwar Fawa
Madobi	Burji	Burji Arewa/Kafin Hausawa I; Burji Arewa/Kafin Hausawa II; Burji Arewa/Kafin Hausawa III; Burji/Ginjau; Maraya Doguwa I; Maraya Doguwa II; Maraya Doguwa III; Maraya Doguwa IV
Madobi	Cinkoso	Cinkoso, Tudun Magaji I; Cinkoso, Tudun Magaji II; Agalawa I; Agalawa II; Cinkoso, Kwari I; Cinkoso, Kwari II; Cinkoso, Kwari III
Madobi	Galinja	Galinja/Kutiyawa; Yalwa Jarmai I; Yalwa Jarmai II; Yalwa Jarmai III; Yalwa Jarmai IV
Madobi	Kafin Agur	Kafin' Agur Gabas I; Kafin' Agur Gabas II; Kofar Yamma/Kofar Kudu I; Kofar Yamma/Kofar Kudu II; Galadima/Unguwar Bala; Rigar Kuyan/Agalawa I; Rigar Kuyan/Agalawa II; Rigar Kuyan/Agalawa III
Madobi	Kaura Mata	Dan'Auta/Unguwar Shu'Aibu I; Dan'Auta/Unguwar Shu'Aibu II; Kaura-Mata I; Kaura-Mata II; Tudun Koya I; Tudun Koya II; Dan Yana
Madobi	Kubaraci	Kubaraci-Ciki; K/Magaji I; K/Magaji II; K/Galadima I; K/Galadima II; Fulatan-Kaguwa I; Fulatan-Kaguwa II; Cindo/Rimin Karofi I; Cindo/Rimin Karofi II; Daminawa I; Daminawa II; Kubaraci Zangon Yamma/Zangon-Gabas I; Kubaraci Zangon Yamma/Zangon-Gabas II; Aska/Tabani; Aska/Tabani II; Kundurun Gazana I; Kundurun Gazana II; Gara Dunku I; Gara Dunku II; Gara Dunku III; Gara Dunku IV
Madobi	Kwankwaso	Malamai I; Malamai II; Galadima/Riga I; Galadima/Riga II; Tandu; Sara Kebe/Sara Karama; Shiyan; Ningawa/Dare Mudu I; Ningawa/Dare Mudu II; Tsakuwa/Gagarawa I; Tsakuwa/Gagarawa II; Karamar-Riga/Dabirau I; Karamar-Riga/Dabirau II; Karamar-Riga/Dabirau III; Karamar-Riga/Dabirau IV
Madobi	Rikadawa	Rikadawa Kalo I; Rikadawa Kalo II; Rikadawa Sako I; Rikadawa Sako II; Unguwar Dawa/Bode; Jedawa/Cikawa Tudu; Jedawa/Cikawa Kwari I; Jedawa/Cikawa Kwari II; Jirgwai I; Jirgwai II; Jirgwai III; Jirgwai IV
Madobi	Yakun	Yakun Barde/Gobirawa I; Yakun Barde/Gobirawa II; Bare-Bari/Gobirawa I; Bare-Bari/Gobirawa II
Makoda	Babbar Riga	Babbar Ruga I; Babbar Ruga II; Gabasawa; Galoru I; Galoru II; Galoru III; Jamaa I; Jamaa II; Shada; Shantake I; Shantake II; Tukui I; Tukui II; Unguwar Galadima I; Unguwar Galadima II
Makoda	Durma	Durma Cikin Gari I; Durma Cikin Gari II; Unguwar Solai I; Unguwar Solai II; Unguwar Chiroma; Unguwar Adamu I; Unguwar Adamu II; Wango
Makoda	Jibga	Bare Bari I; Bare Bari II; Gambarawa; Jibgar Fulani; Jibga Gari I; Jibga Gari II; Kelawe; Makyakus I; Makyakus II; Unguwar Galadima I; Unguwar Galadima II; Yanbawa; Yartaguwa
Makoda	Kadandani	Bade Gari; Unguwar Biyu; Gawon Bature I; Gawon Bature II; Juyin Hazo I; Juyin Hazo II; Juyin Hazo III; Kadandani Gari I; Kadandani Gari II; Lugge; Sabaru Rade; Tailafiya; Unguwar Kusa I; Unguwar Kusa II
Makoda	Koguna	Babbaka; Chidari I; Chidari II; Chilawa; Koguna Gari I; Koguna Gari II; Kunkurai I; Kunkurai II; Sabon Ruwa; Unguwar Bature; Warba I; Warba II
Makoda	Koren Tatso	Dunawa I; Dunawa II; Dunawa III; Koren Tabo Gari I; Koren Tabo Gari II; Kore Tabo; Makaurata I; Makaurata II; Sabon Gari; Wailare; Waila Burtol
Makoda	Maitsidau	Maitsidau Gari I; Maitsidau Gari II; Maitsidau Gari III; Riga Dubu; Tukun M/Tsidau I; Tukun M/Tsidau II; Unguwar Waziri I; Unguwar Waziri II; Yantsere
Makoda	Makoda	Ganji I; Ganji II; Makoda Gari I; Makoda Gari II; Makoda Gari III; Makoda Gari IV; Unguwar Dogo; Unguwar Zakari I; Unguwar Zakari II; Unguwar Zubairu I; Unguwar Zubairu II; Unguwar Zubairu III; Unguwar Zubairu IV; Unguwar Zubairu V
Makoda	Satame	Dawan Kaya; Jigawa Satame; Satame; Yan Goto; Yallada Gari I; Yallada Gari II
Makoda	Tangaji	Bakarari I; Bakarari II; Tangaji Gari I; Tangaji Gari II; Tangajiyo; Unguwar Adamu I; Unguwar Adamu II; Walawa
Makoda	Wailare	Danbawa; Deberu; Lifi Dawa; Rimi; Wailare Gari I; Wailare Gari II; Wailare Gari III (Kaura Wajibi)
Minjibir	Azore	Azor, E Azore Primary School; Dauni, Dauni Primary School; Farawa Open Space, (Gidan Mai Unguwa); Koya, Koya Primary School; Sambauna, Sambauna Primary School; Wakamawa, Gidan Mai Unguwa I; Wakamawa Gidan, Mai Unguwa II; Yabawa, Yabawa Primary School
Minjibir	Gandurwawa	Bagurawa Primary School; Bagurawa Gabas, Primary School I; Damisawa, Primary School I; Damisawa, Primary School II; Dukawa, Primary School; Gandurwawa, Primary School I; Gandurwawa, Primary School II; Gandurwawa, Primary School III; Gandurwawa Primary School IV; Gizawa Primary School
Minjibir	Kantama	Garke, Primary School I; Garke, Primary School II; Geranya, Primary School; Kachi Shirwa, Primary School I; Kantama, Cikin Gari Primary School I; Kantama, Cikin Gari Primary School II; Kantama, Chiroma Primary School I; Kantama, Chiroma Primary School II; Larabawa, Primary School
Minjibir	Kunya	Dambawa, Primary School; Dumawa, Primary School I; Dumawa, Primary School II; Goda, Primary School; Kaukai, Cikin Gari Primary School; Kaukai, Makadi Primary School I; Kaukai, Makadi Primary School II; Kunya, Cikin Gari Primaryschool I; Kunya, Cikin Gari Primaryschool II; Kunya, Cikin Gari Primaryschool III; Kunya, Cikin Gari Primaryschool IV; Kunya, Cikin Gari Primaryschool V; Kunya, Cikin Gari Primaryschool VI; Kunya, Shaiskawa Gidan Mai Unguwa I; Kunya Shaiskawa, Gidan Mai Unguwa II; Kunya Zanguna, Gidan Mai Unguwa I; Kunya Zanguna, Gidan Mai Unguwa II; Zura, Cikin Gari Primary School; Zura Mandaudu, Gidan Mai Unguwa
Minjibir	Kuru	Duguji, Primary School; Geza, Primary School; Gobirawa, Gidan Mai Unguwa; Jirgabawa, Gidan Mai Unguwa; Kuru, Ckin Gari Primary School I; Kuru, Ckin Gari Primary School II; Kuru, Gabas Primary School; Kurma, Gidan Mai Unguwa; Shegem, Gidan Mai Unguwa; Zabainawa Dansudu, Primary School; Zabainawa Inusa Primary School; Zabainawa Maikudi Gidan Mai Unguwa I; Zabainawa Maikudi Gidan Mai Unguwa II
Minjibir	Kwarkiya	Audaran/Yanhula Gidan Mai Unguwa; Bawuri Gidan Mai Unguwa; Farke Cikin Gari Primary School; Farke Yamma Primary School; Kashirya/Riimaye/Sabon Gari Mai Unguwa I; Kashirya/Riimaye/Sabon Gari Mai Unguwa II; Kwarkiya Primary School; Lifidawa/Yardawa Gidan Mai Unguwa; Marke Primary School; Yantandu/Gidan Tata Gidan Mai Unguwa
Minjibir	Minjibir	Agalawa Primary; Amsharo Primary School I; Amsharo Primary School II; Dingim Primary School; Galawanga Primary School; Jelagu Primary School; Minjibir, Cikin Gari Primary School I; Minjibir, Cikin Gari Primary School II; Minjibir, Cikin Gari Primary School III; Nasarawa Gandu, Gidan Mai Unguwa; Tsohuwar Kasuwa, Minjibir Library I; Tsohuwar Kasuwa Minjibir Library II; Tsohuwar Kasuwa Minjibir Library III; Yanzaki Primary School I; Yanzaki Primary School II
Minjibir	Sarbi	Baggas Gabas, Gidan Mai Unguwa; Magarawa/Tsudarai Primary School; Sarbi Primary School I; Sarbi Primary School II; Zango/Ginduwa Primary School
Minjibir	Tsakiya	Agarandawa, Primary School; Jama'Ar Ladan, Primary School; Kwabna, Primary School; Madawa, Cikin Gari Primary School; Madawa Mai Kasuwa, Gidan Mai Unguwa; Tsage, Primary School; Tsakiya, Primary School; Yajin Rana, Primary School
Minjibir	Wasai	Abudakaya, Primary School I; Abudakaya, Primary School II; Gurjiya, Primary School I; Gurjiya, Primary School II; Kazawa, Cikin Gari Primary School; Kazawa Gandu, Gidan Mai Unguwa; Kawo/Yola Primary School; Kurdu/Changa Gidan Mai Unguwa; Lautai/Fulani, Gidan Mai Unguwa; Rumfa/Darare, Primary School; Wasai Yamma, Primary School I; Wasai Yamma, Primary School II; Wasai Kudu/Gabas, Primary School I; Wasai Kudu/Gabas, Primary School II; Yukana, Primary School
Nasarawa	Dakata	Dawakin Dakata I Hollbonn Primary School; Dawakin Dakata II Hollbonn Primary School; Dawakin Dakata III Hollbonn Primary School; Dawakin Dakata IV Hollbonn Primary School; Dawakin Dakata V Hollbonn Primary School; Dakata Police Station I; Dakata Police Station II; Dakata Police Station III; Dakata Police Station IV; Dakata Police Station V; Dakata Police Station VI; Dakata Special Primary School I; Dakata Special Primary School II; Dakata Special Primary School III; Dakata Special Primary School IV; Dakata Special Primary School V; Dakata Special Primary School VI; Dakata Special Primary School VII; Dakata Special Primary School VIII; Government Secondary School, Kawaje I; Government Secondary School, Kawaje II; Government Secondary School, Kawaje III; Government Secondary School, Kawaje IV; Government Secondary School, Kawaje V; Government Secondary School, Kawaje VI; St. Louis Secondary School I; St. Louis Secondary School II; St. Louis Secondary School III; St. Louis Secondary School IV; Waec Office I; Waec Office II; Waec Office III
Nasarawa	Gama	Filin Mainasara I; Filin Mainasara II; Filin Mainasara III; Gidan Maigari I; Gidan Maigari II; Gwagwarwa Police Station I; Gwagwarwa Police Station II; Gwagwarwa Police Station III; Gwagwarwa Police Station IV; Gwagwarwa Police Station V; Gwagwarwa Police Station VI; Gama Primary School I; Gama Primary School II; Gama Primary School III; Gama Primary School IV; Gama Primary School V; Gama Primary School VI; Gama Primary School VII; Gama Primary School VIII; Gama Primary School IX; Gama Veterinary I; Gama Veterinary II; Gama Veterinary III; Gama Veterinary IV; Kasuwar Murtala I; Kasuwar Murtala II; Kasuwar Murtala III; Kwanar Yan Daru I; Kwanar Yan Daru II; Kwanar Yan Daru III; Kwanar Yan Daru IV; Layin Baba Dara-Dara I; Layin Baba Dara-Dara II; Layin Baba Dara-Dara III; Layin Baba Dara- Dara IV; Layin Baba Dara-Dara V; Layin Baba Dara-Dara VI; Layin Baba Dara-Dara VII; Layin Rijiya Gama I; Layin Rijiya Gama II; Layin Rijiya Gama III; Mangwaron Mahauta I; Mangwaron Mahauta II; Mangwaron Mahauta III; Mangwaron Mahauta IV; Mangwaron Mahauta V; Mangwaron Mahauta VI; Mangwaron Mahauta VII; Mangwaron Mahauta VIII; Suntulma Primary School I; Suntulma Primary School II; Suntulma Primary School III; Suntulma Primary School IV; Suntulma Primary School V; Suntulma Primary School VI; Suntulma Primary School VII; Suntulma Primary School VIII; Suntulma Primary School IX; Suntulma Primary School X
Nasarawa	Gawuna	Brigade Primary School I; Brigade Primary School II; Brigade Primary School III; Brigade Primary School IV; Brigade Primary School V; Brigade Primary School VI; Brigade Primary School VII; Brigade Primary School VIII; Brigade Primary School IX; Brigade Primary School X; Brigade Primary School XI; Brigade Primary School XII; Brigade Primary School XIII; Brigade Primary School XIV; Filin Dogo I; Filin Dogo II; Filin Dogo III; Filin Dogo IV; Filin Dogo V; Gawuna Special Primary School I; Gawuna Special Primary School II; Gawuna Special Primary School III; Gawuna Special Primary School IV; Gawuna Special Primary School V; Gawuna Special Primary School VI; Gawuna Special Primary School VII; Gawuna Special Primary School VIII; Gawuna Special Primary School IX; Gawuna Special Primary School X; Gawuna Special Primary School XI; Makara Huta I; Makara Huta II; Makara Huta III; Tsamiya Gidan Amarya I; Tsamiya Gidan Amarya II; Tsamiya Gidan Amarya III; Tsamiya Gidan Amarya IV; Tsamiya Gidan Amarya V; Tsamiya Gidan Amarya VI
Nasarawa	Gwagwarwa	Chediya Uku I; Chediya Uku II; Chediya Uku III; Chediya Uku IV; Chediya Uku V; Chediya Uku VI; Chediya Uku VII; Chediya Uku VIII; Chediya Uku IX; Chediya Uku X; Chediya Uku XI; Chediya Uku XII; Chediya Uku XIII; Chediya Uku XIV; Chediya Uku XV; Dandalin Dandada I; Dandalin Dandada II; Dandalin Dandada III; Dandalin Dandada IV; Dandalin Dandada V; Dandalin Dandada VI; Dandalin Dandada VII; Famfan Wanka I; Famfan Wanka II; Famfan Wanka III; Gwagwarwa Primary School I; Gwagwarwa Primary School II; Gwagwarwa Primary School III; Gwagwarwa Primary School IV; Gwagwarwa Primary School V; Gwagwarwa Primary School VI; Gwagwarwa Primary School VII; Gwagwarwa Primary School VIII; Gwagwarwa Primary School IX; Gwagwarwa Primary School X; Gwagwarwa Primary School XI; Gwagwarwa Primary School XII; Gwagwarwa Primary School XIII; Gwagwarwa Primary School XIV; Gwagwarwa Primary School XV; Gwagwarwa Primary School XVI; Gwagwarwa Primary School XVII; Gwagwarwa Primary School XVIII; Kings Garden I; Kings Garden II; Kings Garden III; Kings Garden IV; Kings Garden V; Kings Garden VI; Kings Garden VII; Kwanar Kifi I; Kwanar Kifi II; Kwanar Kifi III; Yan Doya I; Yan Doya II; Yan Doya III; Yan Kura I; Yan Kura II
Nasarawa	Giginyu	Behind Police Station I; Behind Police Station II; Behind Police Station III; Behind Police Station IV; Behind Police Station V; Behind Police Station VI; Da'Awah Islamiyya I; Da'Awah Islamiyya II; Da'Awah Islamiyya III; Da'Awah Islamiyya IV; Giginyu Primary School I; Giginyu Primary School II; Giginyu Primary School III; Giginyu Primary School IV; Giginyu Primary School V; Giginyu Primary School VI; Giginyu Primary School VII; Giginyu Primary School VIII; Giginyu Primary School IX; Giginyu Primary School X; Giginyu Primary School XI; Giginyu Primary School XII; Giginyu Primary School XIII; Giginyu Primary School XIV; Giginyu Primary School XV; Giginyu Primary School XVI; Giginyu Primary School XVII; Giginyu Primary School XVIII; Giginyu Primary School XIX; Government Technical College Kano Staff I; Government Technical College Kano Staff II; Kawo Cikin Gari I; Kawo Cikin Gari II; Kawo Cikin Gari III; Kawo Cikin Gari IV; Kawo Cikin Gari V; Kawo Cikin Gari VI; Kawo Cikin Gari VII; Kawo Cikin Gari VIII; Kawo Cikin Gari IX; Kawo Cikin Gari X; Kawo Unguwar, Gaya Primary School I; Kawo Unguwar, Gaya Primary School II; Kawo Unguwar, Gaya Primary School III; Kawo Unguwar, Gaya Primary School IV; Kawo Unguwar, Gaya Primary School V; Kawo Unguwar Gaya, Primary School VI; Kawo Unguwar Gaya, Primary School VII; Kawo Unguwar Gaya, Primary School VIII; Kawo Unguwar Gaya, Primary School IX; Kawo Unguwar Gaya, Primary School X; Kawo Unguwar Gaya, Primary School XI; Kawo Unguwar Gaya, Primary School XII; Kawo Unguwar Gaya, Primary School XIII; Masama; Magwam Special Primary School I; Magwam Special Primary School II; Magwam Special Primary School III; Nta Quarters I; Nta Quarters II; Nta Quarters III; Race Course; Race Course II; Race Course III; Race Course IV; Race Course V; Race Course VI; Sankoree I; Sankoree II; Sankoree III; Zangon Tagwai
Nasarawa	Hotoro North	Hotoro North, Primary School I; Hotoro North, Primary School II; Hotoro North, Primary School III; Hotoro North, Primary School IV; Hotoro North, Primary School V; Hotoro North, Primary School VI; Hotoro North, Primary School VII; Hotoro North, Primary School VIII; Hotoro North, Primary School IX; Hotoro North, Primary School X; Hotoro North, Primary School XI; Hotoro North, Primary School XII; Hotoro North, Primary School XIII; Ladanai, Ung Malamai; Rauda Keyi; Walalambe; Wuro Bagga, Primary School; Yandodo I; Yandodo II
Nasarawa	Hotoro South	Hotoro South, Primary School I; Hotoro South, Primary School II; Hotoro South, Primary School III; Hotoro South, Primary School IV; Hotoro South, Primary School V; Hotoro South, Primary School VI; Hotoro South, Primary School VII; Hotoro South, Primary School VIII; Hotoro South, Primary School IX; Hotoro South, Primary School X; Hotoro South, Primary School XI; Hotoro South, Primary School XII; Hotoro South, Primary School XIII; Hotoro South, Primary School XIV; Hotoro South, Primary School XV; Hotoro South, Primary School XVI; Hotoro South, Primary School XVII; Hotoro South, Primary School XVIII; Kaseppa Quarters I; Kaseppa Quarters II; Kwanar Sabo; Mobile Hotoro I; Mobile Hotoro II; Mobile Hotoro III; Unguwar Gabas I; Unguwar Gabas II; Unguwar Gabas III; Unguwar Gabas IV
Nasarawa	Kawaji	Filin Sauna I; Filin Sauna II; Filin Sauna III; Filin Sauna IV; Filin Sauna V; Filin Sauna VI; Filin Sauna VII; Filin Sauna VIII; G. G. A. S. Kawaji I; G. G. A. S. Kawaji II; G. G. A. S. Kawaji III; G. G. A. S. Kawaji IV; Kawaji/Jigirya Primary School I; Kawaji/Jigirya Primary School II; Kawaji/Jigirya Primary School III; Kawaji/Jigirya Primary School IV; Kawaji/Jigirya Primary School V; Kawaji/Jigirya Primary School VI; Kawaji/Jigirya Primary School VII; Kawaji/Jigirya Primary School VIII; Kawaji/Jigirya Primary School IX; Kawaji/Jigirya Primary School X; Kawaji/Jigirya Primary School XI; Kawaji/Jigirya Primary School XII; Kawaji/Jigirya Primary School XIII; Kawaji/Jigirya Primary School XIV; Kawaji/Jigirya Primary School XV; Kawaji/Jigirya Primary School XVI; Kawaji/Jigirya Primary School XVII; Kawaji/Yankaba Primary School I; Kawaji/Yankaba Primary School II; Kawaji/Yankaba Primary School III; Kawaji/Yankaba Primary School IV; Kawaji/Yankaba Primary School V; Kawaji/Yankaba Primary School VI; Sauna Kawaji Primary School I; Sauna Kawaji Primary School II; Sauna Kawaji Primary School III; Sauna Kawaji Primary School IV; Tokarawa Primary School I; Tokarawa Primary School II; Tokarawa Primary School III
Nasarawa	Kaura Goje	Ahmadiyya Secondary School I; Ahmadiyya Secondary School II; Ahmadiyya Secondary School III; Ahmadiyya Secondary School IV; Getsi I; Getsi II; Getsi III; Getsi IV; Getsi V; Kuka Daya I; Kuka Daya II; Kuka Daya III; Kuka Daya IV; Layin Prp I (Kofar Gidan Mal. Ado I); Layin Prp II (Kofar Gidan Mal. Ado II); Layin Prp III (Kofar Gidan Mal. Ado III); Layin Habiba Usman Mai Tsidau Nursery Pri. Sch. I I (Kofar Gidan Mal. Ado IV); Layin Habiba Usman Mai Tsidau Nursery Pri. Sch. II II (Kofar Gidan Mal. Ado V); Kaura Goje Primary School I; Kaura Goje Primary School II; Kaura Goje Primary School III; Kaura Goje Primary School IV; Kaura Goje Primary School V; Kaura Goje Primary School VI; Kaura Goje Primary School VII; Kaura Goje Primary School VIII; Kaura Goje Primary School IX; Kwana Hudu I; Kwana Hudu II; Kwana Hudu III; Kwana Hudu IV; Kwana Hudu V; Kwana Hudu VI; Kwana Hudu VII; Kwanar Jaba, Bus Stop I; Kwanar Jaba, Bus Stop II; Kwanar Jaba, Bus Stop III; Kwanar Jaba, Bus Stop IV; Kwanar Jaba, Bus Stop V; Kwanar Jaba, Bus Stop VI; Kwanar Jaba, Bus Stop VII; Kwanar Jaba, Bus Stop VIII; Kwanar Jaba, Bus Stop IX; Layin Labbo; Mangwaron Shata I; Mangwaron Shata II; Prp Bus Stop I; Prp Bus Stop II; Prp Bus Stop III; Prp Bus Stop IV; Prp Bus Stop V; Prp Bus Stop VI; Prp Bus Stop VII; Rafin Sale I; Rafin Sale II; Rafin Sale III; Rafin Sale IV; Rafin Sale V; Rimin Dillalai I; Rimin Dillalai II
Nasarawa	Tudun Murtala	Getsi I; Getsi II; Getsi III; Getsi IV; Getsi V; Getsi VI; Getsi VII; Tagarji I; Tagarji II; Tagarji III; Tagarji IV; Tagarji V; Tagarji VI; Tagarji VII; Tagarji VIII; Tudun Murtala, Spe. Primary School I; Tudun Murtala, Spe. Primary School II; Tudun Murtala, Spe. Primary School III; Tudun Murtala, Spe. Primary School IV; Tudun Murtala, Spe. Primary School V; Tudun Murtala, Spe. Primary School VI; Tudun Murtala, Spe. Primary School VII; Tudun Murtala, Spe. Primary School VIII; Tudun Murtala, Spe. Primary School IX; Tudun Murtala, Spe. Primary School X; Tudun Murtala, T/Gari I; Tudun Murtala, T/Gari II; Tudun Murtala, T/Gari III; Tudun Murtala, T/Gari IV; Tudun Murtala, T/Gari V; Tudun Murtala, Sabon Asibiti I; Tudun Murtala, Sabon Asibiti II; Tudun Murtala, Sabon Asibiti III; Unguwar Gabas I; Unguwar Gabas II; Unguwar Gabas III
Nasarawa	Udenin Gida	Dawakin Dakata I Hollbonn Primary School; Dawakin Dakata II Hollbonn Primary School; Dawakin Dakata III Hollbonn Primary School; Dawakin Dakata IV Hollbonn Primary School; Dawakin Dakata V Hollbonn Primary School; Dakata Police Station I; Dakata Police Station II; Dakata Police Station III; Dakata Police Station IV; Dakata Police Station V; Dakata Police Station VI; Dakata Special Primary School I; Dakata Special Primary School II; Dakata Special Primary School III; Dakata Special Primary School IV; Dakata Special Primary School V; Dakata Special Primary School VI; Dakata Special Primary School VII; Dakata Special Primary School VIII; Government Secondary School, Kawaje I; Government Secondary School, Kawaje II; Government Secondary School, Kawaje III; Government Secondary School, Kawaje IV; Government Secondary School, Kawaje V; Government Secondary School, Kawaje VI; St. Louis Secondary School I; St. Louis Secondary School II; St. Louis Secondary School III; St. Louis Secondary School IV; Waec Office I; Waec Office II; Waec Office III
Nasarawa	Akum	Filin Mainasara I; Filin Mainasara II; Filin Mainasara III; Gidan Maigari I; Gidan Maigari II; Gwagwarwa Police Station I; Gwagwarwa Police Station II; Gwagwarwa Police Station III; Gwagwarwa Police Station IV; Gwagwarwa Police Station V; Gwagwarwa Police Station VI; Gama Primary School I; Gama Primary School II; Gama Primary School III; Gama Primary School IV; Gama Primary School V; Gama Primary School VI; Gama Primary School VII; Gama Primary School VIII; Gama Primary School IX; Gama Veterinary I; Gama Veterinary II; Gama Veterinary III; Gama Veterinary IV; Kasuwar Murtala I; Kasuwar Murtala II; Kasuwar Murtala III; Kwanar Yan Daru I; Kwanar Yan Daru II; Kwanar Yan Daru III; Kwanar Yan Daru IV; Layin Baba Dara-Dara I; Layin Baba Dara-Dara II; Layin Baba Dara-Dara III; Layin Baba Dara- Dara IV; Layin Baba Dara-Dara V; Layin Baba Dara-Dara VI; Layin Baba Dara-Dara VII; Layin Rijiya Gama I; Layin Rijiya Gama II; Layin Rijiya Gama III; Mangwaron Mahauta I; Mangwaron Mahauta II; Mangwaron Mahauta III; Mangwaron Mahauta IV; Mangwaron Mahauta V; Mangwaron Mahauta VI; Mangwaron Mahauta VII; Mangwaron Mahauta VIII; Suntulma Primary School I; Suntulma Primary School II; Suntulma Primary School III; Suntulma Primary School IV; Suntulma Primary School V; Suntulma Primary School VI; Suntulma Primary School VII; Suntulma Primary School VIII; Suntulma Primary School IX; Suntulma Primary School X
Nasarawa	Udenin	Brigade Primary School I; Brigade Primary School II; Brigade Primary School III; Brigade Primary School IV; Brigade Primary School V; Brigade Primary School VI; Brigade Primary School VII; Brigade Primary School VIII; Brigade Primary School IX; Brigade Primary School X; Brigade Primary School XI; Brigade Primary School XII; Brigade Primary School XIII; Brigade Primary School XIV; Filin Dogo I; Filin Dogo II; Filin Dogo III; Filin Dogo IV; Filin Dogo V; Gawuna Special Primary School I; Gawuna Special Primary School II; Gawuna Special Primary School III; Gawuna Special Primary School IV; Gawuna Special Primary School V; Gawuna Special Primary School VI; Gawuna Special Primary School VII; Gawuna Special Primary School VIII; Gawuna Special Primary School IX; Gawuna Special Primary School X; Gawuna Special Primary School XI; Makara Huta I; Makara Huta II; Makara Huta III; Tsamiya Gidan Amarya I; Tsamiya Gidan Amarya II; Tsamiya Gidan Amarya III; Tsamiya Gidan Amarya IV; Tsamiya Gidan Amarya V; Tsamiya Gidan Amarya VI
Nasarawa	Loko	Chediya Uku I; Chediya Uku II; Chediya Uku III; Chediya Uku IV; Chediya Uku V; Chediya Uku VI; Chediya Uku VII; Chediya Uku VIII; Chediya Uku IX; Chediya Uku X; Chediya Uku XI; Chediya Uku XII; Chediya Uku XIII; Chediya Uku XIV; Chediya Uku XV; Dandalin Dandada I; Dandalin Dandada II; Dandalin Dandada III; Dandalin Dandada IV; Dandalin Dandada V; Dandalin Dandada VI; Dandalin Dandada VII; Famfan Wanka I; Famfan Wanka II; Famfan Wanka III; Gwagwarwa Primary School I; Gwagwarwa Primary School II; Gwagwarwa Primary School III; Gwagwarwa Primary School IV; Gwagwarwa Primary School V; Gwagwarwa Primary School VI; Gwagwarwa Primary School VII; Gwagwarwa Primary School VIII; Gwagwarwa Primary School IX; Gwagwarwa Primary School X; Gwagwarwa Primary School XI; Gwagwarwa Primary School XII; Gwagwarwa Primary School XIII; Gwagwarwa Primary School XIV; Gwagwarwa Primary School XV; Gwagwarwa Primary School XVI; Gwagwarwa Primary School XVII; Gwagwarwa Primary School XVIII; Kings Garden I; Kings Garden II; Kings Garden III; Kings Garden IV; Kings Garden V; Kings Garden VI; Kings Garden VII; Kwanar Kifi I; Kwanar Kifi II; Kwanar Kifi III; Yan Doya I; Yan Doya II; Yan Doya III; Yan Kura I; Yan Kura II
Nasarawa	Tunga/Bakono	Behind Police Station I; Behind Police Station II; Behind Police Station III; Behind Police Station IV; Behind Police Station V; Behind Police Station VI; Da'Awah Islamiyya I; Da'Awah Islamiyya II; Da'Awah Islamiyya III; Da'Awah Islamiyya IV; Giginyu Primary School I; Giginyu Primary School II; Giginyu Primary School III; Giginyu Primary School IV; Giginyu Primary School V; Giginyu Primary School VI; Giginyu Primary School VII; Giginyu Primary School VIII; Giginyu Primary School IX; Giginyu Primary School X; Giginyu Primary School XI; Giginyu Primary School XII; Giginyu Primary School XIII; Giginyu Primary School XIV; Giginyu Primary School XV; Giginyu Primary School XVI; Giginyu Primary School XVII; Giginyu Primary School XVIII; Giginyu Primary School XIX; Government Technical College Kano Staff I; Government Technical College Kano Staff II; Kawo Cikin Gari I; Kawo Cikin Gari II; Kawo Cikin Gari III; Kawo Cikin Gari IV; Kawo Cikin Gari V; Kawo Cikin Gari VI; Kawo Cikin Gari VII; Kawo Cikin Gari VIII; Kawo Cikin Gari IX; Kawo Cikin Gari X; Kawo Unguwar, Gaya Primary School I; Kawo Unguwar, Gaya Primary School II; Kawo Unguwar, Gaya Primary School III; Kawo Unguwar, Gaya Primary School IV; Kawo Unguwar, Gaya Primary School V; Kawo Unguwar Gaya, Primary School VI; Kawo Unguwar Gaya, Primary School VII; Kawo Unguwar Gaya, Primary School VIII; Kawo Unguwar Gaya, Primary School IX; Kawo Unguwar Gaya, Primary School X; Kawo Unguwar Gaya, Primary School XI; Kawo Unguwar Gaya, Primary School XII; Kawo Unguwar Gaya, Primary School XIII; Masama; Magwam Special Primary School I; Magwam Special Primary School II; Magwam Special Primary School III; Nta Quarters I; Nta Quarters II; Nta Quarters III; Race Course; Race Course II; Race Course III; Race Course IV; Race Course V; Race Course VI; Sankoree I; Sankoree II; Sankoree III; Zangon Tagwai
Nasarawa	Guto/Aisa	Hotoro North, Primary School I; Hotoro North, Primary School II; Hotoro North, Primary School III; Hotoro North, Primary School IV; Hotoro North, Primary School V; Hotoro North, Primary School VI; Hotoro North, Primary School VII; Hotoro North, Primary School VIII; Hotoro North, Primary School IX; Hotoro North, Primary School X; Hotoro North, Primary School XI; Hotoro North, Primary School XII; Hotoro North, Primary School XIII; Ladanai, Ung Malamai; Rauda Keyi; Walalambe; Wuro Bagga, Primary School; Yandodo I; Yandodo II
Nasarawa	Nasarawa East	Filin Sauna I; Filin Sauna II; Filin Sauna III; Filin Sauna IV; Filin Sauna V; Filin Sauna VI; Filin Sauna VII; Filin Sauna VIII; G. G. A. S. Kawaji I; G. G. A. S. Kawaji II; G. G. A. S. Kawaji III; G. G. A. S. Kawaji IV; Kawaji/Jigirya Primary School I; Kawaji/Jigirya Primary School II; Kawaji/Jigirya Primary School III; Kawaji/Jigirya Primary School IV; Kawaji/Jigirya Primary School V; Kawaji/Jigirya Primary School VI; Kawaji/Jigirya Primary School VII; Kawaji/Jigirya Primary School VIII; Kawaji/Jigirya Primary School IX; Kawaji/Jigirya Primary School X; Kawaji/Jigirya Primary School XI; Kawaji/Jigirya Primary School XII; Kawaji/Jigirya Primary School XIII; Kawaji/Jigirya Primary School XIV; Kawaji/Jigirya Primary School XV; Kawaji/Jigirya Primary School XVI; Kawaji/Jigirya Primary School XVII; Kawaji/Yankaba Primary School I; Kawaji/Yankaba Primary School II; Kawaji/Yankaba Primary School III; Kawaji/Yankaba Primary School IV; Kawaji/Yankaba Primary School V; Kawaji/Yankaba Primary School VI; Sauna Kawaji Primary School I; Sauna Kawaji Primary School II; Sauna Kawaji Primary School III; Sauna Kawaji Primary School IV; Tokarawa Primary School I; Tokarawa Primary School II; Tokarawa Primary School III
Nasarawa	Nasarawa Central	Ahmadiyya Secondary School I; Ahmadiyya Secondary School II; Ahmadiyya Secondary School III; Ahmadiyya Secondary School IV; Getsi I; Getsi II; Getsi III; Getsi IV; Getsi V; Kuka Daya I; Kuka Daya II; Kuka Daya III; Kuka Daya IV; Layin Prp I (Kofar Gidan Mal. Ado I); Layin Prp II (Kofar Gidan Mal. Ado II); Layin Prp III (Kofar Gidan Mal. Ado III); Layin Habiba Usman Mai Tsidau Nursery Pri. Sch. I I (Kofar Gidan Mal. Ado IV); Layin Habiba Usman Mai Tsidau Nursery Pri. Sch. II II (Kofar Gidan Mal. Ado V); Kaura Goje Primary School I; Kaura Goje Primary School II; Kaura Goje Primary School III; Kaura Goje Primary School IV; Kaura Goje Primary School V; Kaura Goje Primary School VI; Kaura Goje Primary School VII; Kaura Goje Primary School VIII; Kaura Goje Primary School IX; Kwana Hudu I; Kwana Hudu II; Kwana Hudu III; Kwana Hudu IV; Kwana Hudu V; Kwana Hudu VI; Kwana Hudu VII; Kwanar Jaba, Bus Stop I; Kwanar Jaba, Bus Stop II; Kwanar Jaba, Bus Stop III; Kwanar Jaba, Bus Stop IV; Kwanar Jaba, Bus Stop V; Kwanar Jaba, Bus Stop VI; Kwanar Jaba, Bus Stop VII; Kwanar Jaba, Bus Stop VIII; Kwanar Jaba, Bus Stop IX; Layin Labbo; Mangwaron Shata I; Mangwaron Shata II; Prp Bus Stop I; Prp Bus Stop II; Prp Bus Stop III; Prp Bus Stop IV; Prp Bus Stop V; Prp Bus Stop VI; Prp Bus Stop VII; Rafin Sale I; Rafin Sale II; Rafin Sale III; Rafin Sale IV; Rafin Sale V; Rimin Dillalai I; Rimin Dillalai II
Nasarawa	Nasarawa Main Town	Getsi I; Getsi II; Getsi III; Getsi IV; Getsi V; Getsi VI; Getsi VII; Tagarji I; Tagarji II; Tagarji III; Tagarji IV; Tagarji V; Tagarji VI; Tagarji VII; Tagarji VIII; Tudun Murtala, Spe. Primary School I; Tudun Murtala, Spe. Primary School II; Tudun Murtala, Spe. Primary School III; Tudun Murtala, Spe. Primary School IV; Tudun Murtala, Spe. Primary School V; Tudun Murtala, Spe. Primary School VI; Tudun Murtala, Spe. Primary School VII; Tudun Murtala, Spe. Primary School VIII; Tudun Murtala, Spe. Primary School IX; Tudun Murtala, Spe. Primary School X; Tudun Murtala, T/Gari I; Tudun Murtala, T/Gari II; Tudun Murtala, T/Gari III; Tudun Murtala, T/Gari IV; Tudun Murtala, T/Gari V; Tudun Murtala, Sabon Asibiti I; Tudun Murtala, Sabon Asibiti II; Tudun Murtala, Sabon Asibiti III; Unguwar Gabas I; Unguwar Gabas II; Unguwar Gabas III
Nasarawa	Ara I	Bompai Police Station I; Bompai Police Station II; Bompai Police Station III; Bompai Police Station IV; Dangana Primary School I; Dangana Primary School II; Dangana Primary School III; Dangana Primary School IV; Dangana Primary School V; Dangana Primary School VI; Dangana Primary School VII; Dangana Primary School VIII; Dangana Primary School IX; Eye Clinic; Rijiyar Dangote I; Rijiyar Dangote II; Rijiyar Dangote III; Sabuwar Tudu Wada I; Sabuwar Tudu Wada II; Sabuwar Tudu Wada III; Sabuwar Tudu Wada IV; Sabuwar Tudu Wada V; Sim Airport Road; Filin Tudun Wada I (Tudun Wada, Gidan Maigari I); Filin Tudun Wada II (Tudun Wada, Gidan Maigari II); Filin Tudun Wada III (Tudun Wada, Gidan Maigari III); Tudun Wada, Spe. Primary School I; Tudun Wada, Spe. Primary School II; Tudun Wada, Spe. Primary School III; Tudun Wada, Spe. Primary School IV; Tudun Wada, Spe. Primary School V; Tudun Wada, Spe. Primary School VI; Tudun Wada, Spe. Primary School VII; Tudun Wada, Spe. Primary School VIII
Rano	Lausu	Kambarawa; Kurmi; Lausu Gabas I; Lausu Gabas II; Lausu Gabas III; Lausu Yamma; Shangu; Yawar
Rano	Rano	Agency For Mass Educ. I; Agency For Mass Educ. II; Rano Central Pry. Sch. I; Rano Central Pry. Sch. II; Rano Central Pry. Sch. III; Rano Central Pry. Sch. IV; Rano Central Pry. Sch. V; Rano Kofar Fada I; Rano Kofar Fada II; Mai Bene Islamiyya Sch. Open Space I (Sabo Layi I); Mai Bene Islamiyya Sch. Open Space II (Sabo Layi II); Junior Girls Sec Sch. Open Space (Shagari Quarters I); Shagari Quarters II; Mal. Sabiu Miftahuddeen Islamiyya Kofar Fada (Television Centre I); Television Centre II; Tuka-Tuka I Open Space (Tuka-Tuka I); Tuka-Tuka II Open Space (Tuka-Tuka II); Unguwar Guska Open Space (Unguwar Gusk)
Rano	Rurum Sabon-Gari	Bakin Inji I; Bakin Inji II; Dispensary; Doka - Rurum; Fadi Sonka; Munture I; Munture II; Refawa; Rurum Sabon Gari I; Rurum Sabon Gari II; Rurum Sabon Gari III; Rurum Sabon Gari IV; Unguwar Sule I; Unguwar Sule II
Rano	Rurum Tsohon-Gari	J. S. S. Rurum I; J. S. S. Rurum II; Kafi; Kaura Garba I; Kaura Garba II; Kaura Garba III; Kaura Garba IV; Mazauna I; Mazauna II; Tashar Idi
Rano	Saji	Dangage; Jangaru; Kafin Alhaji; Rinji; Saji Cikin Gari I; Saji Cikin Gari II; Tai-Tai; Takalafiya; Taruja; Buran; Kwachani; Yama
Rano	Zinyau	Baizo; Bima; Funkuyi; Gidan Murabus; Dispensary Unguwar Kadiri Open Space (Unguwar Kadiri); War; Zinyau Cikin Gari
Rano	Zurgu	Garabi Primary Sch. I Open Space (Garabi I); Garabi Primary Sch. II Open Space (Garabi II); Deri Primary Sch. Open Space (Gidan Deri I); Garabi Primary Sch. III Open Space (Gidan Deri II); Dan Garko Islamiyya Open Space (Gidan Kwari); Gudaji; Ruwan Kanya I; Ruwan Kanya II; Yado Islamiyya Open Space (Unguwar Yado); Zambur I; Zambur II; Zurgu I; Zurgu II
Rimin Gado	Butu-Butu	Akalawa, Kofar Mai Unguwa I; Akalawa, Kofar Mai Unguwa II; Ba'Awa/Jantsauni Primary I; Ba'Awa/Jantsauni Primary II; Butu-Butu, Cikin Gari Primary School I; Butu-Butu, Cikin Gari Primary School II; Hamgako Islamiyyah; Dan-Isa Cikin Gari, Kofar Gidan Mai Unguwa; Dan-Isa Cikin Gari, Islamiyya; Kazar Dawa, Islamiyya Cikin Gari I; Kazar Dawa, Islamiyya Cikin Gari II; Kazar Dawa, Islamiyya Cikin Gari III; Unguwar Turaki, Kofar Gidan Mai Unguwar
Rimin Gado	Dawakin Gulu	Asakala Open Space; Chilbawa Openspace I; Chilbawa Openspace II; Dawakin Gulu, Primary School I; Dawakin Gulu, Primary School II; Kwarin Haido, Open Space I; Kwarin Haido, Open Space II
Rimin Gado	Doka Dawa	Doka-Dawa, Cikin Gari Primary School; Indabo -Islamiya Primary School I; Indabo -Islamiya Primary School II; Jama'A Tungawa, Open Space; Kanye Primary School; Katsinawa Primary School; Kazar Dawa, Primary School; Zangon Durgu, Open Space
Rimin Gado	Dugurawa	Bankamawa, Islamiyyah Primary School I; Bankamawa, Islamiyyah Primary School II; Dugurawa, Cikin Gari I; Dugurawa, Cikin Gari II; Kirgawa, Open Space I; Kirgawa, Open Space II; Magadawa, Open Space
Rimin Gado	Gulu	Gulu Cikin Gari, Open Space I; Gulu Cikin Gari, Open Space II; Gulu Cikin Gari, Open Space III; Kawari, Open Space I; Kawari, Open Space II; Kawari Open Space III; Limawa Primary School I; Limawa Primary School II; Ruga Open Space I; Tatal Open Space I; Tatal Open Space II; Tsalle Open Space; Unguwar Daudu, Open Space I; Unguwar Daudu, Open Space II; Wangara, Primary School
Rimin Gado	Jili	Badawa Primary School; Birfa Open Space; Birfa/Takwami Open Space; Garun Bera, Open Space I; Gashin Baki, Open Space II; Jili Cikin Gari, Primary School; Jujin Amadu, Open Space I; Jujin Amadu, Open Space II; Juji Cikin Gari, Primary School I; Juji Cikin Gar, I Primary School II; Jujin Kosau, Open Space; Rinji Primary School
Rimin Gado	Karofin Yashi	Chillawa Open Space; Danshayi Primary School I; Danshayi Primary School II; Gadawa Primary School I; Gadawa Primary School II; Kwari Open Space; Karofin Yashi, Cikin Gari Primary School
Rimin Gado	Rimin Gado	Atawa Primary School I; Atawa Primary School II; Cikin Gari/.Masallachi Open Space I; Cikin Gari/.Masallachi Open Space II; Kofar Arewa Primary School I; Kofar Arewa Primary School II; Kafanga Islamiyya School I; Kafanga Islamiyya School II; Kofar Gari Open Space I; Kofar Gari Open Space II; Unguwar Ganji Open Space
Rimin Gado	Sakaratsa	Bambara Open Space; Jarkasa/D. Garba Open Space I; Jarkasa/D. Garba Open Space II; Jobawa Open Space; Katakau Open Space; Sakaratsa Cikin Gari Primary School I; Sakaratsa Cikin Gari Primary School II
Rimin Gado	Tamawa	Fadama Open Space; Mai Awaki/Hayewa, Open Space I; Mai Awaki/Hayewa, Open Space II; Mai Gari, Cikin Gari Primary School; Mai Garin Damo, Open Space; Makada U/Sanda, Islamiyyah; Tamawa, Cikin Gari Primary School; Zuri Primary School
Rimin Gado	Yalwan Danziyal	Danbare, Openspace; Farin Dabino I; Fagin Dabino II; Gidan Fulani/Kwangi, Open Space I; Gidan Fulani/Kwangi, Open Space II; Gidan Fulani/Kwangi, Open Space III; Katsinawa Primary School I; Katsinawa Primary School II; Kofar Fada, Open Space I; Kofar Fada, Open Space II; Kurnar Bungel, Open Space; Makwalla, Open Space; Unguwar Barde, Open Space I; Unguwar Barde, Open Space II; Waila/G. Zaki, Open Space I; Waila/G. Zaki, Open Space II; Zango, Open Space
Rimin Gado	Zango Dan Abdu	Duwatsu, Open Space; Kadani Open Space; Kukuni Dispensary; Rinjin Shiri, Primary School; Unguwar Yamma, Dispensary I; Unguwar Yamma, Dispensary II; Zango, Cikin Gari Primary School I; Zango, Cikin Gari Primary School II; Zango Cikin Gari Primary School III
Rogo	Beli	Aduwa; Babbarika; Beli I; Beli II; Hago I; Hago II; Galadima; Hayin Lisaini; Makamfachi; Makwalla; Ruhogi; Tukurwa; Shinga; Ung. Dagachi; Ung. Makera
Rogo	Fulatan	Fulatan Cikin Gari I; Fulatan Cikin Gari II; Fulatan Cikin Gari III; Fulatan Danda; Fulatan Dawa; Fulatan Islamiyya; Fulatan S/Gari I; Fulatan S/Gari II; Hausawa; Makamfachi; Nasarawa; Nasarawa B/Gida; Nasarawa Daggo; Sabon Garin Fulatan; Unguwar Hassan; Yanoko
Rogo	Gwangwan	Bari I; Bari II; Bari III; D/Bari; D/Gwangwan; D. Nawa Gwangwan; Gwangwan I; Gwangwan II; Hore; Unguwa Gora; Y/Bari
Rogo	Jajaye	Arewawa; Bakari; Barbaji; Jajaye Cikin Gari I; Jajaye Cikin Gari II; Madatai; Sagwandare; Tasawa
Rogo	Rogo Ruma	Gangarbi I; Gangarbi II; Kukkuba; Rogo K/Gabas/Kaleka I; Rogo K/Gabas/Kaleka II; Rogo K/Yamma; Sabuwar Unguwa; Tsamiyar Mai Baba; Tsohuwar Rogo I; Tsohuwar Rogo II; Zage-Zagi; Zamfarawa Tukurwa; Rogo K / Makera
Rogo	Rogo Sabon Gari	Balawa Rinji I; Balawa Rinji II; Bakoni; Kauyemn Liman; Rogo Bakin Kasuwa I; Rogo Bakin Kasuwa II; Rogo Yarkasuwa; Rogo K/Gabas K/Ilia I; Rogo K/Gabas K/Ilia II; Rogo Yarkasuwa I; Rogo Yarkasuwa II; Titin Hakimi; Tsaunin Taura
Rogo	Ruwan Bago	Dansambo; Gajuna; Hurugu; Kadana; Kurereji; Kayarda; Ruwan Bago I; Ruwan Bago II; Sundu; Tukurwan Kadana; Ung. Baure; Ung. Gwaffa; Ung. Liman; Ung. M. Abdu; Ung. Makama; Ung. Wari; Wawaye
Rogo	Zarewa	Aciyama; Balawa; D/Giwa; G/Abdul Wahab; G/Buhari; H/Kanawa; Karo; Sabon Fegi I; Sabon Fegi II; Ung. Allura; Yamfalalu Yamma; Yamfalalu Gabas`; Zarewa Cikin Gari I; Zarewa Cikin Gari II
Rogo	Zoza	Agalawa; Daminawa; Daminawar Kaleku; Danmarka; G/Mari; Ganjarawa; Gauza; K/Barde; Kaleku I; Kaleku II; Kaleku III; K/Soda; Kwakwan; Karshi; Muntake I; Muntake II; T/Taura; Zoza I; Zoza II; Zoza IV
Shanono	Alajawa	Alajawa Cikin Gari I; Alajawa Cikin Gari II; Dan Kurchiya; Katafawa I; Katafawa II; Koya Chikin Gari; Unguwar Kuka; Unguwar Tsamiya Bakawi
Shanono	Dutsen-Bakoshi	Bayan-Dutse; Dorogo; Gasawa I; Gasawa II; Goda Cikin Chikin Gari; Jikanshi; Kafi I; Kafi II; Kankara; Rimi Taini; Unguwar Soda; Yanshado
Shanono	Faruruwa	Karau Tashar Limi I; Karau Tashar Limi II; Karau Ta Maina I; Karau Ta Maina II; Gss Faruruwa Public Building I (Unguwar Gabas I); Gss Faruruwa Public Building II (Unguwar Gabas II); Gss Faruruwa Public Building III (Unguwar Gabas III); Gss Faruruwa Public Building IV (Unguwar Gabas IV); Unguwar Tudu/Faruruwa I; Unguwar Tudu/Faruruwa II; Unguwar Tudu/Faruruwa III; Unguwar Tudu/Faruruwa IV; Unguwar Tofa; Unguwar Yamma I; Unguwar Yamma II; Unguwar Yamma III; Gss Faruruwa Public Building V (Unguwar Yamma IV); Yan Awaki I; Yan Awaki II
Shanono	Kadamu	Dankinji; Dogon Marke; Girgam; Jigawa; Kadamu Chikin Gari I; Kadamu Chikin Gari II; Kauyen Kuka; Kundila Chikin Gari; Marga I; Marga II; Rigga; Rinji; Yangabo I; Yangabo II
Shanono	Kokiya	Gudan-Tuwo I; Gudan-Tuwo II; Gudan-Tuwo Unguwar Kasim; Kazaga; Kiyawa; Kokiya Chikin Gari I; Kokiya Chikin Gari II; Unguwar Kwari; Unguwar Adi
Shanono	Leni	Badumawa; Bakwami Chikin Gari; Jibaga; Leni Gabas; Leni Yamma; Majingini; Takama; Gamji
Shanono	Shakogi	Bori I; Bori II; Gejiya; Godarawa Chikin Gari; Sabaru I; Sabaru II; Sabon Gari I; Sabon Gari II; Shakogi Chikin Gari I; Shakogi Chikin Gari II; Unguwar Danfatu; Unguwar Gabari; Unguwar Kwari; Unguwaryalli; Unguwar Yamma
Shanono	Shanono	Gabasawa I; Gabasawa II; Gabasawa III; Gabasawa IV; Galadimawa I; Galadimawa II; Galadimawa III; Galadimawa IV; Jaulere I; Jaulere II; Korofi; Kuido; Kwangwai I; Jan Maza Islamiyya School Public Building (Kwangwai II); Limanchi I; Limanchi II; Marabutawa; Marabutawa II; Yangwamma
Shanono	Tsaure	Badumawa; Gotawa; Janburji I; Janburji II; Litarawa; Litarawa/Tuba; Malamawa; Tsaure Chikin Gari; Unguwar Bura; Unguwar Gadu; Unguwar Rogo; Yammawa; Yan Shado Chikin Gari I; Yan Shado Chikin Gari II
Sumaila	Gala	Arinza; Baji; Gala B/Kasuwa I; Gala B/Kasuwa II; Gala B/Kasuwa III; Bingi I; Bingi II; Dartsana/Mashere; Duji; Gala Cikin Gari I; Gala Cikin Gari II; Gala Cikin Gari III; Gamai; Gwarai; Kadabo Pri. School; Tsida; Unguwar Sidi
Sumaila	Gani	Bagagare; Bunturu; Bakin Laraba; Burmunawa; Danbazau Yamma; Gabare; Gani Cikin Gari Primary School I; Gani Cikin Gari Primary School II; Gidan Bauchi; Gidan Girbau; Gidan Mission; Gwarabjawa; Jangadago; Kantudu; Kofar Alaramma I; Kofar Alaramma II; Unguwar Godiya
Sumaila	Garfa	Agalawa; Alfindi I; Alfindi II; Baffaru; Faradachi, Sabon Gari; Faradachi, Tsohon Gari; Gandan; Garfa Cikin Gari Primary School I; Garfa Cikin Gari Primary School II; Sira
Sumaila	Gediya	Bakin Lahadi; Bido; Dando 'A' Primary School I; Dando 'B' Primary School II; Digiya; Gandarma; Gata; Gediya Cikin Gari 'A' Primary School I; Gediya Cikin Gari 'B' Primary School II; Gidan Danhabi; Karo; Kula 'A' Primary School I; Kula 'B' Primary School II; Kula Tsida; Rumsama; Tabanni; Ziyara
Sumaila	Kanawa	Bango, C/Gari Primary School; Bunabus; Dingamu, Primary School I; Dingamu, Primary School II; Jali; Judan; Kanawa, Cikin Gari Primary School I; Kanawa, Cikin Gari Primary School II; Kanawa Kudu; Kawo; Tisha; Yanbawa
Sumaila	Magami	Beta I; Beta II; Kakimatsi; Kwajale 'A' Primary School I; Kwajale 'B' Primary School II; Kwajale 'C' Primary School III; Kwangwaro Gari; Magami, Cikin Gari Primary School; Magami Yamma; Kofar Fada I; Kofar Fada II; Kofar Fada III; Kofar Fada IV; Mako; S/Kaja; Sansani A, Primary School; Sansani B, Primary School; Tumbushi; Yakaduna
Sumaila	Rimi	Awaya; Dakumbal 'A' Primary School I; Dakumbal 'B' Primary School II; Farin Dutse Primary School; Jafura; Kwalele; Rimi Gabas 'A' Primary School I; Rimi Gabas 'B' Primary School II; Rimi Library I; Rimi Library II; Rimi Library III; Rimi Library IV; Rimi Yamma I; Rimi Yamma II; Rimi Yamma III; Rimi Yamma IV; Ruwan Rinji; Tasaya; Tukuda
Sumaila	Rumo	Baure; Bunturu/Tsida; Dubo; Dundumawa; Jisai; Lama; Riyi; Rumo Jafura 'A' Primary School I; Rumo Jafura 'A' Primary School II; Sira; Tsugunama
Sumaila	Sitti	Albasawa; Bayan Dutse; Doguwar Dorawa; Doka; Giginya Biyar; Makutsa; Matugwai; Nufawa; Raya 'A' Primary School I; Raya 'B' Primary School II; Sitti Cikin Gari, Primary School I; Sitti Cikin Gari, Primary School II; Sitti Cikin Gari, Primary School III; Sitti Yamma, Open Space I; Sitti Yamma, Open Space II; Yu'U; Zamba
Sumaila	Sumaila	Kadiyawa; Kanti Old Motor Park-Sumaila I; Kanti Old Motor Park-Sumaila II; Kargo, Primary School I; Kargo, Primary School II; Musari; Rafin Kanya; Sanda; Sumaila Central Primary School I; Sumaila Central Primary School II; Sumaila Central Primary School III; Sumaila Central Primary School IV; Sumaila Central Primary School V; Sumaila Gabas, Primary School I; Sumaila Gabas, Primary School II; Sumaila Gabas, Primary School III; Sumaila Gabas, Primary School IV; Sumaila Yamma, Primary School V; Sumaila Yamma, Primary School VI; Sumaila Yamma, Primary School VII
Takai	Bagwaro	Bagwaro Gabas; Bagwaro Yamma; Bagwaro Bango; Bagwaro Banaka; Bagwaro G/Malam; Bagwaro Gunsu; Birnin Bako Gabas; Birnin Bako Yamma I; Birnin Bako Yamma II; Kayarda Gabas; Kayarda Yamma; Shikutu Gabas I; Shikutu Gabas II; Taushen Kaji; Tumbushi; Unguwar Gaude
Takai	Durbunde	Durbunde Gabas I; Durbunde Gabas II; Durbunde Yamma I; Durbunde Yamma II; Durbunde Dallo; Durbunde Katanga I; Durbunde Katanga II; Durbunde Yamusawa; Durbunde Dogo; Durbunde Muntsira; Durbunde Tagahu; Durbunde Tsurutawa; Gidan Baleri; Kafin Lafiya Arewa; Kafin Lafiya T/Wada; Kafin Lafiya Katuru; Kafin Lafiya Diga; Kafin Lafiya Dumbam; Kafin Lafiya Cikin Gari; Sakwaya Arewa I; Sakwaya Arewa II; Sakwaya Guburi; Sakwaya Kakawu; Sakwaya Jibawa; Sakwaya Tawaliya
Takai	Fajewa	Dara; Dutse Maikai; Fajewa Kofa; Fajewa Gabas; Fajewa Kudu; Garin Hatsai; Gurjiya; Gwadaba; Hatsai Gabas; Hatsai Yamma; Juramu; Larau; Sulluru; Salmandai I; Salmandai II; Tururu; Yar Dado
Takai	Falali	Barmo; Binginde; Dispensary; Falali, Kofar Fada I; Falali, Kofar Fada II; Falali Primary I; Falali Primary II; Falali Arewa; Fita; Jangargari; Kyansha; Kafin Wachiyawa
Takai	Kachako	Auzara; Auzara Dansarina; Damari; Huguma Gabas I; Huguma Gabas II; Huguma Yamma I; Huguma Yamma II; Huguma Kudu I; Huguma Kudu II; Kachako Gabas I; Kachako Gabas II; Kachako Yamma I; Kachako Yamma II; Kachako Kudu I; Kachako Kudu II; Kachako Arewa I; Kachako Arewa II; Kachako Makera I; Kachako Makera II; Kachako Gandu; Kwanar Huguma I; Kwanar Huguma II; Langwami Gari I; Langwami Gari II; Langwami Gabas I; Langwami Gabas II; Langwami Yamma I; Langwami Yamma II; Mainamaji; Unguwar Mai Gamji; Unguwar Lemo I; Unguwar Lemo II; Unguwar Dandali
Takai	Kuka	Dalawa; D/Madiga; Gamawa; Gungara; Jibawa; Kuka; Kau; Kafin Sidda I; Kafin Sidda II; Moja I; Moja II; Zango
Takai	Takai	Bakin Kasuwa I; Bakin Kasuwa II; Bakin Asibiti; Daushanga Gari; Daushanga Tasha I; Daushanga Tasha II; Daushanga Rinji; Daushanga Tukwane; Dabinai I; Dabinai II; Danzakara; Fuloti I; Fuloti II; Fuloti III; Garandiya Fada I; Garandiya Fada II; Garindiya Gabas; Gwaza I; Gwaza II; Jaka; Kukawa; Kaniyaka; Loko I; Loko II; Loko III; Mashema; Madami; Takai Fititi; Takai Waila I; Takai Waila II; Takai, Kofar Yamma I; Takai, Kofar Yamma II; Takai, Kofar Fada I; Takai, Kofar Fada II; Tambar
Takai	Zuga	Kogo Gabas; Kogo Kudu; Kogo Afatai; Kogo Katsallake; Kogo Innari; Rinji; Tsaraina; Tsintar; Zango; Zuga Arewa; Zuga Kudu; Zuga Lautai; Zuga Alajiri; Zuga Kogo Fatuwa
Tarauni	Babban Giji	Babban Giji Dispensary I; Babban Giji Dispensary II; Babban Giji, Dispensary III; Babban Giji, Dispensary IV; Babban Giji, Dispensary V; Babban Giji, Dispensary VI; Babban Giji, Dispensary VII; Filin Hockey I; Filin Hockey II; Filin Hockey III; Filin Hockey IV; Filin Hockey V; Sabilur Rashad Isl. Pri. Sch. Kundila I (Filin Hockey VI); Sabilur Rashad Isl. Pri. Sch. Kundila II (Filin Hockey VII); Babayaro Isl. Pri. Sch. Kundila I (Filin Hockey VIII); Babayaro Isl. Pri. Sch. Kundila II (Filin Hockey IX); Hausawa Primary School I; Hausawa Primary School II; Hausawa Primary School III; Hausawa Primary School IV; Hausawa Primary School V; Model Pri. Sch, Hausawa I (Hausawa Primary School VI); Model Pri. Sch, Hausawa II (Hausawa Primary School VII); Murtala Muhd Sec Sch, Hausawa I (Hausawa Primary School VIII); Murtala Muhd Sec Sch, Hausawa II (Hausawa Primary School IX); Murtala Muhd Sec Sch, Hausawa III (Hausawa Primary School X); Murtala Muhd Sec Sch, Hausawa IV (Hausawa Primary School XI); Murtala Muhd Sec Sch, Hausawa V (Hausawa Primary School XII)
Tarauni	Darmanawa	Darmanawa I; Darmanawa II; Darmanawa III; Darmanawa IV; Darmanawa V; Dantsinke Pri. Sch. I (Dantsinke I); Dantsinke Pri. Sch. II (Dantsinke II); Karkasara Primary School I; Karkasara Primary School II; Karkasara Primary School III; Karkasara Primary School IV; Karkasara Primary School V; Karkasara Primary School VI; Karkasara Primary School VII; Karkasara Primary School VIII; Karkasara Primary School IX; Kanzul Ilmi Isl Pri. Sch., Sallari I (Filin Sallari Quarters I); Kanzul Ilmi Isl Pri. Sch., Sallari II (Filin Sallari Quarters II); Filin Sallari Quarters III; Filin Sallari Quarters IV; Filin Sallari Quarters V; Filin Sallari Quarters VI; Filling Sallari Quarters
Tarauni	Daurawa	Daurawa Primary School I; Daurawa Primary School II; Daurawa Primary School III; Daurawa Primary School IV; Daurawa Primary School V; Daurawa Primary School VI; Daurawa Primary School VII; Daurawa Primary School VIII; Daurawa Primary School IX; Community Isl Pri. Sch., Daurawa I (Daurawa Primary School X); Community Isl Pri. Sch., Daurawa II (Daurawa Primary School XI); No. 1 Danhausa Road, Gidan Danhausa, Premises I (Filin Protocol I); No. 1 Danhausa Road, Gidan Danhausa, Premises II (Filin Protocol II); No. 1 Danhausa Road, Gidan Danhausa, Premises III (Filin Protocol III); No. 1 Danhausa Road, Gidan Danhausa, Premises IV (Filin Protocol IV); No. 1 Danhausa Road, Gidan Danhausa, Premises V (Filin Protocol V); No. 423 Sokoto Road, Gidan Danhausa Theatre Premises VI (Filin Protocol VI); No. 423 Sokoto Road, Gidan Danhausa Theatre Premises VII (Filin Protocol VII); Kundila Primary School I; Kundila Primary School II; Kundila Primary School III; Kundila Primary School IV; Kundila Primary School V; Kundila Primary School VI; Kundila Primary School VII; Kundila Primary School VIII
Tarauni	Gyadi-Gyadi Arewa	Gyadi Gyadi-Islamiyya School I; Gyadi Gyadi-Islamiyya School II; Gyadi Gyadi-Islamiyya School III; Gyadi Gyadi-Islamiyya School IV; Filin Dangi, Zoo Road I (Gyadi Gyadi-Islamiyya School V); Filin Dangi, Zoo Road II (Gyadi Gyadi-Islamiyya School VI); Filin Dangi, Zoo Road III (Gyadi Gyadi-Islamiyya School VII); Filin Dangi, Zoo Road IV (Gyadi Gyadi-Islamiyya School VIII); Filin Dangi, Zoo Road V (Gyadi Gyadi-Islamiyya School IX); Filin Dangi, Zoo Road VI (Gyadi Gyadi-Islamiyya School X); Filin Dangi, Zoo Road VII (Gyadi Gyadi-Islamiyya School XI); Filin Bako Mai Bulo, Unguwar Inji I (Unguwar Inji I); Filin Bako Mai Bulo, Unguwar Inji II (Unguwar Inji II); Filin Bako Mai Bulo, Unguwar Inji III (Unguwar Inji III); Filin Bako Mai Bulo, Unguwar Inji IV (Unguwar Inji IV); Women Centre I; Women Centre II; Women Centre III; Women Centre IV; Women Centre V; Women Centre VI
Tarauni	Gyadi-Gyadi Kudu	Gyadi-Gyadi, Central Primary School I; Gyadi-Gyadi, Central Primary School II; Gyadi-Gyadi, Central Primary School III; Gyadi-Gyadi, Central Primary School IV; Gyadi-Gyadi, Central Primary School V; Gyadi-Gyadi, Central Primary Schoolvi; Gyadi-Gyadi, Central Primary School VII; Gyadi-Gyadi, Central Primary School VIII; Gyadi-Gyadi, Central Primary School IX; Gyadi-Gyadi, Central Primary School X; Gyadi-Gyadi, Central Primary School XI; Gyadi-Gyadi, Central Primary School XII; Gyadi-Gyadi, Central Primary School XIII; Gyadi Gyadi, Girls Secondary School I; Gyadi Gyadi, Girls Secondary School II; Gyadi Gyadi, Girls Secondary School III; Gyadi Gyadi, Girls Secondary School IV; Gyadi Gyadi, Girls Secondary School V
Tarauni	Hotoro (Nnpc)	Maradin Primary School, Maradin I (Filin Maradin I); Maradin Primary School, Maradin II (Filin Maradin II); Maradin Primary School, Maradin III (Filin Maradin III); Maradin Primary School, Maradin IV (Filin Maradin IV); Danmarke Primary School, Walawai I (Filin Walawai I); Danmarke Primary School, Walawai II (Filin Walawai II); Filin Yanawaki; Gindin Mangwaro I; Gindin Mangwaro II; Gindin Mangwaro III; Gindin Mangwaro IV; Hotoro Nnpc I; Hotoro Nnpc II; Hotoro Nnpc III; Hotoro Nnpc IV; Opp. Euro Bank Limawa Quarters I (Limawa Gidan Mai Unguwa I); Opp. Euro Bank Limawa Quarters II (Limawa Gidan Mai Unguwa II); Opp. Euro Bank, Limawa Quarters III (Limawa Gidan Mai Unguwa III); Police Out Post I; Police Out Post II
Tarauni	Kauyen Alu	Goribar Isiyaku I; Goribar Isiyaku II; Goribar Isiyaku III; Goribar Isiyaku IV; Famfon Dan Yobe, Goriba I (Goribar Isiyaku V); Famfon Dan Yobe, Goriba II (Goribar Isiyaku VI); Famfon Dan Yobe, Goriba III (Goribar Isiyaku VII); Kauyen Alu Primary School I (Kauyen Mohammadu I); Kauyen Alu Primary School II (Kauyen Mohammadu II); Kauyen Alu Primary School III (Kauyen Mohammadu III); Kauyen Alu Primary School IV (Kauyen Mohammadu IV); Kauyen Alu Primary School V (Kauyen Mohammadu V); Kauyen Alu Primary School VI (Kauyen Mohammadu VI); Babban Layi Kwana Shida I (Kwana Shida I); Babban Layi Kwana Shida II (Kwana Shida II); Shargalle Health Centre, Premises I (Kwana Shida III); Shargalle Health Centre, Premises II (Kauyen Alu)
Tarauni	Unguwar Gano	Near Service Mast, Rinji (Rinji Quarters I); Gidan Store, Rinji (Rinji Quarters II); Katangar Sarki, Rinji (Rinji Quarters III); Unguwar Gano, Primary School I; Unguwar Gano, Primary School II; Unguwar Gano, Primary School III; Unguwar Gano, Primary School IV; Unguwar Gano, Primary School V; Unguwar Gano, Primary School VI; Unguwar Gano, Primary School VII; Unguwar Gano, Primary School VIII; Tsohon Filin Idi Unguwar Gano I (Unguwar Gano, Primary School IX); Tsohon Filin Idi Unguwar Gano II (Unguwar Gano, Primary School X); Tsohon Filin Idi Unguwar Gano III (Unguwar Gano Primary School XI); Yar Akwa Quarters I; Tsamiyar Dillalai, Yar Akwa I (Yar Akwa Quarters II); Tsamiyar Dillalai, Yar Akwa II (Yar Akwa Quarters III); Tsamiyar Dillalai, Yar Akwa III (Yar Akwa Quarters IV); Filin Na Gero Zaria Road, Yar Akwa I (Yar Akwa Quarters V); Filin Na Gero Zaria Road, Yar Akwa II (Yar Akwa Quarters VI)
Tarauni	Unguwa Uku	Kauyen Nono A I; Kauyen Nono A II; Kauyen Nono B I; Kauyen Nono B II; Kauyen Nono B III; Unguwa Uku S. P. S. I; Unguwa Uku S. P. S. II; Unguwa Uku S. P. S. III; Unguwa Uku S. P. S. IV; Unguwa Uku S. P. S. V; Govt. Girls Junior Sec. School, Unguwa Uku I (Unguwa Uku S. P. S. VI); Govt. Girls Junior Sec. School, Unguwa Uku II (Unguwa Uku S. P. S. VII); Govt. Girls Junior Sec. School, Unguwa Uku III (Unguwa Uku S. P. S. VIII); Govt. Girls Junior Sec. School, Unguwa Uku IV (Unguwa Uku S. P. S. IX); Govt. Girls Senior Sec. School, Unguwa Uku V (Unguwa Uku S. P. S. X); Govt. Girls Senior Sec. School, Unguwa Uku VI (Unguwa Uku S. P. S. XI); Govt. Girls Senior Sec. School, Unguwa Uku VII (Unguwa Uku S. P. S. XII); Govt. Girls Senior Sec. School, Unguwa Uku VIII (Unguwa Uku S. P. S. XIII); Science Senior Project Pri. School, Unguwa Uku I (Unguwa Uku S. P. S. XIV); Science Senior Project Pri. School, Unguwa Uku II (Unguwa Uku S. P. S. XV); Science Senior Project Pri. School, Unguwa Uku III (Unguwa Uku S. P. S. XVI)
Tofa	Dindere	Dindere Primary School; Sire Health Post; Yalwa Health Post I; Yalwa Health Post II
Tofa	Gajida	Bugayawa Turaki; Daguriba/Hissata-K Mai Unguwa; Gajida, Primary School; Jarkasa, Kofar G. Mai Unguwa
Tofa	Ginsawa	Ginsawa C/Gari-Gindin Tsamiya; Ginsawa Dandali, Health Post I; Ginsawa Dandali, Health Post II; Makaurata, Primary School
Tofa	Jauben Kudu	Bugai, Gindin Bishiya I; Bugai, Gindin Bishiya II; Jauben Kudu C/Gari, Primary School; Larabawa, Gindin Bishiya; Mai Gwarje, K Mai Unguwa
Tofa	Janguza	Army Barracks, Primary School I; Army Barracks, Primary School II; Army Barracks, Primary School III; Army Barracks, Primary School IV; Janguza C/Gari, Health Post I; Janguza C/Gari, Health Post II; Janguza C/Gari, Health Post III; Tudun Malama C/Gari, Health Post; Unguwar Fako-Gidin Bishiya
Tofa	Lambu	Bakin Kare, Primary School I; Bakin Kare, Primary School II; Dansudu, Primary School I; Dansudu, Primary School II; Fanshata, Primary School I; Fanshata, Primary School II; Gajerawa, Primary School I; Gajerawa, Primary School II; Kahotara, Primary School; Lambu C/Gari, Primary School I; Lambu C/Gari, Primary School II; Lambu C/Gari, Primary School III
Tofa	Langel	Jama'Ar Zailani, Open Space; Langel C/Gari, Primary School I; Langel C/Gari, Primary School II; Launawa, Islamiyya Primary School; Yandadi, Open Space I; Yandadi, Open Space II
Tofa	Yalwa Karama	Karal Boko, Open Space; Saburawa, K. Mai Unguwa; Yalwa Karama C/Gari, Primary School I; Yalwa Karama C/Gari, Primary School II
Tofa	Yanoko	Babban Gida - Gindin Dorawa I; Babban Gida - Gindin Dorawa II; Gandu/Walawa -Gandu; Kaure - K. Mai Unguwa; Jagaja - Gindin Mangworo I; Jagaja - Gindin Mangworo II; Yanoko C/Gari - Primary School I; Yanoko C/Gari - Primary School II; Yansabo - Primary School I; Yansabo - Primary School II; Zangon Kaba - Gindin Tsamiya I; Zangon Kaba - Gindin Tsamiya II
Tofa	Yarimawa	Dan Amar, Gidan Shanu; Fegin Kankara - Primary School; Hayewa - Health Post; Kajure - Gindin Bishiya; Santar Dankaka - Primary School; Yarimawa C/Gari - Kamfa
Tsanyawa	Daddarawa	Daddarawa Cikin Gari I; Daddarawa Cikin Gari II (Daddarawa Cikin Gari II); Kauyen Gawo I; Kauyen Gawo II; Kura; Rage Arewa; Rage Kudu Gindin Masallaci (Rage Kudu); Unguwar Bakke; Yan-Mamman
Tsanyawa	Dunbulun	Jabar Arewa Islamiyya Pri. Sch. (Jabar Arewa); Jabar Kudu Kofar Gidan Mai Unguwa (Jabar Kudu); Kofar Arewa; Kofar Kudu; Kofar Yamma; Rinjin Takalmawa; Sabon Gari; Umbawa Manwa; Unguwar Gabas; Malamawa Unguwan Gabas Islamiyya Pri. Sch. (Walawas Rigarbarde)
Tsanyawa	Gozaki	Dorayi Salihawa; Gozarki Salihawa I; Gozarki Salihawa II Primary School (Gozarki Salihawa II); Jama-A Saidu I; Jama-A Saidu II Islamiyya Pri. Sch. (Jama-A Saidu II); Jigilawa; R. Tsamiya Gamara I Primary School (R. Tsamiya Gamara I); R. Tsamiya Gamara II Primary School (R. Tsamiya Gamara II); Tafashiyar Kanawa I; Tafashiyar Kanawa II Islamiyya Pri. Sch. (Tafashiyar Kanawa II)
Tsanyawa	Gurun	Babbar Kofa I Islamiyya Pri. Sch. (Babbar Kofa I); Babbar Kofa II Islamiyya Pri. Sch. (Babbar Kofa II); Dutsin Giwa Mahuta I (Dutsin Giwa Mahuta I); Dutsin Giwa Mahuta II; Dutsin Giwa Mahuta III; Gurun Chikin Gari; Jama A; Nasarawa I; Nasarawa II Primary School (Nasarawa II); Sauya Primary School (Sauya); S. Nasara Kabagiwa I Islamiyya School (S. Nasara Kabagiwa I); S. Nasara Kabagiwa II; U. Rimi Gizari (U. Rimi Gizari); Yan Awaki
Tsanyawa	Kabagiwa	Chinama Islamiya Primary School (Chimawa); Harbau Bawawa I; Harbau Bawawa II; Kaba Giwa Cikin Gari; Kwaski Dankunda; Rinjin Baujawa I (Rinjin Baujawa I); Rinjin Baujawa II Rinjin Zidda Islamiyya (Rinjin Baujawa II); Rinjin Baujawa III (Rinjin Baujawa III); R. Kantu Dutsen Kafa; Unguwar Bugaje Islamiyya (Unguwar Bagge); Unguwar Maigari; Unguwar Makama; Unguwar Zango
Tsanyawa	Tatsan	Cikin Gari Tatsan I Islamiyya School (Cikin Gari Tatsan I); Cikin Gari Tatsan II; Dinya Dagero I Sabuwar Santa Islamiyya (Dinya Dagero I); Dinya Dagero II Soro Daya Islamiyya (Dinya Dagero II); Farsa I; Farsa II; Gwanda Tsakuwawa I; Gwanda Tsakuwawa II; Kiririya Dabawa (Kiririya Dabawa); Kurfin Dutse I; Kurfin Dutse II; Yar Gwanda I; Yar Gwanda II; Dorayi Islamiyya I (Yar Amar Darayi I); Dorayi Islamiyya II (Yar Amar Darayi II)
Tsanyawa	Tsanyawa	Kofar Kudu I Pama Primary Schoolgari (Kofar Kudu I); Kofar Kudu II Pama Primary School (Kofar Kudu II); Kofar Kudu III Pama Primary School (Kofar Kudu III); Kofar Yamma I; Kofar Yamma II; Kofar Yamma III; Kunkurawa Islamiyya School (Kunkurawa); Kwarwa Islamiyya School (Kwarwa); Majema I; Majema II; Makera I; Makera II; Zango
Tsanyawa	Yanganau	Babban Duhu; Gawuka; Sabon Garin Kudumi; Sallawa Taka Tsaba; Santar Nasarawa; Sundu Primary School (Sundu); Unguwar Arewa Islamiya Primary School (Unguwar Arewa); Unguwar Dogo; Yanchibi; Yan Ganau
Tsanyawa	Yankamaye	Near K/Gidan Bala Birai Yanromo I Islamiyya School (Birai Yanromo I); Birai Yanromo II Islamiyya School (Birai Yanromo II); Gezawa I Primary School (Gezawa I); Gezawa II; Kera Yantari; Kwandawa Dorayi I; Kwandawa Dorayi II; Unguwar Dogo Islamiyya Pri. Sch. (Madaurari I); Madaurari II; Tugu Jarawa; Yamma; Yankamaye; Zakawa Baurawa
Tsanyawa	Zarogi	Babban Duhu Near Kofar Gidan Mai Unguwa (Baba Duhu); Jaga Islamiyya School (Jaga); Kankarofi Islamiyya School (K. M. Karof); Kwaho; Kera Yantari Primary Scjool (Unguwar Gabas Yamma); Yakanawa I; Yakanawa II; Yamalawar Fulani Islamiyya School (Yamalawar Fulani); Zarogi
Tudun Wada	Baburi	Baburi C/Gari - Primary School I; Baburi C/Gari - Primary School II; Baburi C/Gari - Primary School III; Bazane C/Gari Pri. School; Burgudu C/Gari - Primary School; Dakutukun Pri. School; Dariya- Primary School; Kamfar Kabewa; Madaya Pri. School; Rufan Pri. School; Unguwan Gari Pri. School; Unguwan Karmi Pri. School; Unguwan Kaya Pri. School; Unguwan Maza Pri..Sch; Kanyunguwa Mazo Pri. School; Unguwan Yaro; Ungwan Rufan; Unguwan Doka O/Space; Unguwan Doka Pri. School
Tudun Wada	Burumburum	Burumburum C/Gari - Primary School II; Burumburum C/Gari - Primary School I; Burumburum C/Gari - Primary School III; Chakwado - Primary School I; Chakwado - Primary School II; Churi - Open Space; Fala Tsohon Gari C/Gari - Primary School; Gacha - Primary School; Kafi - Primary School; Kafi - Tashar Mangwaro; Kwazazzabo - Primary School; Shara - Primary School; Shuni - Primary School; Unguwa Gabas - Primary School I; Unguwa Gabas - Primary School II; Zango - Primary School II; Zaiga - Primary School I; Zaiga - Primary School II; Zaiga - Primary School III
Tudun Wada	Dalawa	Dalawa C/Gari; Dalawa - Primary School; Dalawa Kasko; Dalawa Kasko Primary School; Barho; Gagarawa Primary School; Gazobi C/Gari; Gazobi Primary School; Gidan Dinya; Ginda Dori - Open Space; Katakuri - Primary School; Kim; Kamfar Ma'Aja; Unguwar Saya Saya - Primary School; Unguwar Tudu - Primary School I; Unguwar Tudu - Primary School II S/Gari Gazobi; Zanganwu; Unguwar Tudu - Primary School IV Daminnawa
Tudun Wada	Jandutse	Auduga C/Gari I; Auduga C/Gari II; Bayan Dutse; Buri; Faskar Ma'Aji I; Faskar Ma'Aji II; Faskar Ma'Aji III; Hayin Yawa Primary School I; Hayin Yawa Primary School II; Jan Dutse Primary School I; Jan Dutse Primary School II; Kuguru; Mala; Ruwan Tabo; Ung. Balarabe; Ung. Shawai; Zungur Pri Sch I; Zungur Pri Sch II; Zungur Pri Sch III
Tudun Wada	Jita	Auduga C/Gari Pri. Sch I; Auduga C/Gari Pri. Sch II; Buyan Dutse Pri. Sch; Gadanga Islamiyya (Bari Pri. School); Faskar Ma'Aji Pri. School I; Faskar Ma'Aji Pri. School II; Faskar Ma'Aji Pri. School III; Hayin Yawa Pri. School I; Hayin Yawa Pri. School II; Jan Dutse Pri School I; Saran Ladan Islamiyya (Jan Dutse Pri School II); Yarfulani III; Yarfulani IV; Ruwan Tabo Pri. School; Unguwan Balarabe Pri. School; Unguwan Shawai Pri. School; Yarfulani Pri. School II; Yarfulani Pri. School III; Yarfulani Pri. School IV; Yarfulani Pri. School V; Yarfulani Pri. School VI; Zungur Pri. School I; Zungur Pri. School II; Zungur Pri. School III
Tudun Wada	Karefa	Karefa Pry School I; Karefa Pry School II; Karefa Pry School III; Karefa Pry School IV; Jatarai Pry Sch; Malamawa; G/Maigada Open Space; G/Dikko Open Space; Ung. Malam Bala Pry Sch; Tanigel Pry Sch; Maiturmi Pry Sch; Dorayi Pry Sch I; Dorayi Pry Sch II; Fada Yaya Open Space I; Gishirya Pry Sch; Fada Yaya Open Space II; Jaroji Pry Sch; S/Raura Pry Sch; Yalwan Rugu Rugu - Primary School I; Yalwan Rugu Rugu - Primary School II
Tudun Wada	Nata'Ala	Farinruwa Pri. School; Farinruwa O/Space; Mahuta - Primary School; Gazobi Ruwa-Open Space; Kastinawa Open Space; Unguwar Sanusi - Primary School; Marmara Open Space; Nata'Ala - Primary School I; Nata'Ala - Primary School II; Nata'Ala - Primary School III; Nata'Ala - Primary School IV; Sadauki - Primary School; Tuku - Primary School/Nata Ala; Unguwa Ganji Open Space; Unguwa Gayya Open Space; Unguwa Korau Open Space; Unguwa Sarki Open Space; Daba; Unguwar Sanusi II; Wuna - Primary School I/Nata Ala; Wuna - Primary School II/Tuku; Wuna - Primary School III/Wuna C/Gari
Tudun Wada	Sabon Gari	Dagulau Open Space I; Dagulau Open Space II; Tashar Goro; Jammaje I; Jammaje II; Jammaje III; Gunduma I; Gunduma II; Copper Court Open Space I; Copper Court Open Space II; Copper Court Open Space III; Bakin Kasuwa Open Space I; Bakin Kasuwa Open Space II; Civil Defence I (Bakin Kasuwa Open Space III); Civil Defence II (Bakin Kasuwa Open Space IV); Gawo Open Space I; Gawo Open Space II; Kakar-Kakar Pri Sch; Titin Yayande Open Space I; Titin Yayande Open Space II; Titin Yayande Open Space III; Titin Yayande Open Space IV; Titin Faska - Primary School I; Titin Faska - Primary School II; Titin Faska Open Space; Fire Brigade (Yan'Awaki - Primary School)
Tudun Wada	Tsohogari	Dalaudu; Hayintata - Primary School; Athani Pri. Sch. I (Ung Tanko I); Kafi Islamiyya Sch. Open Space (Ung Tanko II); Ung Tanko III; Ung Tanko IV; Ung Tanko V; Sani Usman Kura Islamiyya (Kofar Sarki); Kofar Fada II; Asibiti Buga Duniya; Unguwa Bature Open Space I; Unguwa Bature Open Space II; Unguwa Bature Open Space III; Nysc Model Pri. Sch. (Unguwa Bature Open Space IV); Unguwa Jibrin - Primary School I; Sani Usman Kura Islamiya (Unguwa Jibrin - Primary School II); Mega Islamiyya I (Unguwa Jibrin - Primary School III); Mega Islamiyya II (Unguwa Jibrin - Primary School IV); Unguwa Jibrin - Primary School V; Unguwa Jibrin - Primary School VI; Unguwa Jibrin - Primary School VII; Unguwa Jibrin - Primary School VIII; Unguwa Jibrin - Primary School IX; Unguwa Na'Abu - Primary School I; Unguwa Na'Abu - Primary School II; Unguwa Na'Abu - Primary School III; Unguwa Na'Abu - Primary School IV; Unguwa Tanko - Primary School I; Unguwa Tanko - Primary School II; Unguwa Tanko - Primary School III; Unguwa Tanko - Primary School IV
Tudun Wada	Yaryasa	Yar Yas C/Gari Pri Sch II; Yaryasa Pri. Sch. (Yar Yas C/Gari Pri Sch III); Yar Yas C/Gari Pri Sch IV; Ung. Dole Open Space; Dogon Kawo I; Dogon Kawo II; Tashar Inji I; Tashar Inji II; Kyan Gyaran Pri Sch I; Ung. Dole Open Space II; Tsamiya Pri Sch; Kyan Gyaran Pri Sch II; Yar Maraya; Kariya; Jeli I; Sumana; Unguwa Ibrahim - Primary School; Maijuntu; Damaga; Yaryasa - Primary School IV; Yarmariya - Primary School I; Yarmariya - Primary School II
Ungogo	Bachirawa	Amarzakawa / Primary School (Amarzakawa); Bachirawa; Bachirawa Cikin Gari I; Bachirawa Cikin Gari II; Bachirawa Cikin Gari III; Bachirawa Cikin Gari IV; Bachirawa Cikin Gari V; Bachirawa Cikin Gari VI; Bachirawa Cikin Gari VII; Bachirawa Cikin Gari VIII; Bachirawa Gabas I; Bachirawa Gabas II; Bachirawa Gabas III; Bachirawa G/Maigari I / Titin Kofar Fada I (Bachirawa G/Maigari I); Bachirawa G/Maigari II / Titin Kofar Fada II (Bachirawa G/Maigari II); Bachirawa Tukwane I; Bachirawa Tukwane II; Bachirawa Tukwane III; Bachirawa Tukwane IV; Bachirawa Tukwane V; Bachirawa Tukwane VI; Bachirawa Tukwane VII; G/Iya / Islamiyya Primary School (G/Iya); Katsinawa I; Katsinawa II; Katsinawa III; Kududdufawa G/Mai Unguwa / Primary School (Kududdufawa G/Mai Unguwa); Kududdufawa G/Maigari / Primary School (Kududdufawa G/Maigari); Zango Kaya / Islamiyya Primary School (Zango Kaya); Zango Kaya G/Mai Unguwa / Layin Transformer (Zango Kaya G/Mai Unguwa)
Ungogo	Gayawa	Dankunkuru I; Dankunkuru II; Gayawa I; Gayawa II; Gayawa III; Gunde; Koranchi; Kumantaka; Rimaye; Ummadawa
Ungogo	Karo	Bagujan; Karo; Munchika; Tarda I; Tarda II; Waceni
Ungogo	Panisau	Gera I; Gera II; Kera; Panisau I; Panisau II; Panisau III; Panisau IV; Panisau V; Sabon Gari; Walawa; Yola
Ungogo	Rangaza	Ink Yen I; Ink Yen II; Kunza Shauni; Kwajalawa; Rangaza I; Rangaza II; Rangaza III; Rumawa; S/Rangaza I; S/Rangaza II; S/Rangaza III; S/Rangaza IV; S/Rangaza V; S/Rangaza VI; Zaura Babba I; Zaura Babba II; Zaura Babba III; Zaurad/Babba I; Zaurad/Babba II; Zaurad/Babba III; Zaura Fulani; Zaura Kadage; Zaurayan Ali
Ungogo	Rijiyar Zaki	B. U. K. Staf Quarters I; B. U. K. Staf Quarters II; B. U. K. Staf Quarters III; Dausayi I; Dausayi II; Dausayi III; Rijiyar Zaki I; Rijiyar Zaki II; Rijiyar Zaki III; Rijiyar Zaki IV; Rijiyar Zaki V; Rijiyar Zaki VI; Rijiyar Zaki VII; Rimin Gata I; Rimin Gata II; Rimin Zakara I; Rimin Zakara II
Ungogo	Tudun Fulani	Chiromawa; Dabaro; Gadan; Yadau; Jajira C/Gari; Jajira Gobirawa; Jajira F/Limawa; Jamadi I; Jamadi II; Jamadi III; Jamadi IV; Rubudi; Sabuwar Gadan I; Sabuwar Gadan II; Tudun Fulani I; Tudun Fulani II; Tudun Fulani III; Tudun Fulani IV; Waika; Yankifi A; Yankifi II; Yankifi III; Yankifi IV; Yankifi V; Yankifi VI; Yankifi VII; Yankifi VIII; Yankifi IX
Ungogo	Ungogo	Alharini; B/Kasuwa; Doka; Gandu; Kakurum; Kansuwa; Mashuni; Minkyau; Nasara Doka; Sabuwar Doka I; Sabuwar Doka II; Sabuwar Doka III; Ungogo Arewa I; Ungogo Arewa II; Ungogo Kudu I; Ungogo Kudu II; Ungogo Gabas; Ungogo Yamma; Ungogo Jangaru I; Ungogo Jangaru II; Yammadi
Ungogo	Yadakunya	Adaraye I; Adaraye II; Dausara I; Dausara II; Inusawa I; Inusawa II; S/ Inusawa I; S/ Inusawa II; Yadakunya I; Yadakunya II; Yadakunya III; Yadakunya IV; Yadakunya Hospital I; Yadakunya Hospital II; Yar Inusawa I; Yar Inusawa II
Warawa	Amarawa	Amarawa; Jigawa; Tadatti
Warawa	Danlasan	Danlasan I; Danlasan II; Iyatawar Kanawa; Rimin Mayu; Yan Gurji
Warawa	Garin Dau	Barnawa; Garundau I; Garundau II; Gidan Sarki; Gidan Tuku; Kwari; Mada/Landa; Wanbato
Warawa	Gogel	Dakatsalle; Gogel I; Gogel II; Gogel III; Karabe; Yamatawa
Warawa	Imawa	Fagoji; Gidan Dalada; Imawa; Kanta; Mahaka; Wangara
Warawa	Jemagu	Ganitsuru I; Ganitsuru II; Jemagu I; Jemagu II; Maboyi; Makera I; Makera II; Yanlanya
Warawa	J/Galadima	Chango; Jumar Galadima I; Jumar Galadima II; Kadawa I; Kadawa II; Larabawa; Sabuwar Jumar Galadima; Unguwar Magajiya; Yartofa
Warawa	Katarkawa	Danhawagiwa; Gishiri Wuya I; Gishiri Wuya II; Katarkawa; Kinchau; Naira; Turba; Walagigi
Warawa	Madari Mata	Ganakakun I; Ganakakun II; Madarin Maba I; Madarin Maba II; Madarin Maba III; Marayar Wuta; Sabon Garin Nasara; Talawa
Warawa	Tamburawar Gabas	Fartawa; Tamburawar Gabas I; Tamburawar Gabas II; Unguwar Zururu; Yandadi I; Yandadi II; Yadaudu I; Yadaudu II; Zango Danmarke
Warawa	Tangar	Charka; Danfari I; Danfari II; Dantsawa; Haladawa; Hayin Wazo; Jilawa; Kargawa; Marayar Rogo; Rigar Gabas; Tanagar I; Tanagar II; Warkai Rugar Yamma; Yalma
Warawa	Warawa	Dushe I; Dushe II; Jalawa I; Jalawa II; Warawa I; Warawa II
Warawa	'Yan Dalla	Gumaka; Kanwa; Police Academy; 'Yandalla; 'Yandalla II
Warawa	'Yangizo	Alimawa; Buromawa; Giwaran Alitini I; Giwaran Alitini II; Giwaran Jijiyawa I; Giwaran Jijiyawa II; 'Yangizo I; 'Yangizo II; 'Yangizo III
Wudil	Achika	Achika Bange - Primary School I; Achika Bange - Primary School II; Achika G/Kauye - Primary School; Achika Hurumi - Primary School I; Achika Hurumi - Primary School II; Achika Hurumi - Primary School III; Achika Hurumi - Primary School IV; Achika Yallawa - Primary School I; Achika Yallawa - Primary School II; Achika/Yansoro/Raushi - Primary School
Wudil	Dagumawa	Babura - Primary School; Basama - Under Tree; Basaimawa - Primary School; Bayan Secretariat - Under Tree I; Bayan Secretariat - Under Tree II; Bayan Secretariat - Under Tree III; Dagumawa C/Gari - Primary School I; Dagumawa C/Gari - Primary School II; Fagen Zaki - Primary School; Jumar Danfadal - Primary School; Jumar Danfadal - Under Tree I; Jumar Danfadal - Under Tree II; Jumar Fulani - Primary School; Jumar Kwari - Under Tree I; Jumar Kwari - Under Tree II; Jumar Tudu - Under Tree; Yan Sarki - Primary School I; Yan Sarki - Primary School II
Wudil	Dankaza	Dankaza Bambara - Primary School; Dankaza Bogga - Open Space; Dankaza Hurumi - Primary School; D/Hausawar Gware - Primary School I; D/Hausawar Gware - Primary School II; Dankaza Kantudu - Primary School; Dankaza Kekuwa - Primary School I; Dankaza Kekuwa - Primary School II; Dankaza Tsallewa - Under Tree; Dankaza Wuro Geza - Primary School; Gware Hurumi - Primary School; Sabon Garin Kurna - Under Tree
Wudil	Darki	Darki Hurumi - Primary I; Darki Hurumi - Primary II; Darki Hurumi - T. V. Centre I; Darki Hurumi - T. V. Centre II; Dareji - Primary School I; Dareji - Primary School II; Zogon Marke - Primary School I; Zogon Marke - Primary School II; D/Tikawabange - Primary School I; Ganda K. Darki - Primary School; Zango Islamiyya - Islamiyya Primary School I; Zango Islamiyya - Islamiyya Primary School II; Zango Islamiyya - Islamiyya Primary School III; Zango Makera - Under Tree; Zango Makera - Open Space
Wudil	Indabo	Indabo Gabas - Primary School I; Indabo Gabas - Primary School II; Indabo Gabas - Primary School III; Indabo Gabas - Primary School IV; Indabo Gabas - Primary School V; Indabo Gabas - Primary School VI; Indabo Katai - Under Tree I; Indabo Katai - Under Tree II; Indabo Yamma - Primary School I; Indabo Yamma - Primary School II; Indabo Yamma - Primary School III; Indabo Yamma - Primary School IV; Indabo Zango - Under Tree I; Indabo Zango - Under Tree II
Wudil	Kausani	Dila - Primary School I; Dila - Primary School II; Fadi Sonka - Primary School I; Fadi Sonka - Primary School II; Gaci Kedi - Primary School I; Gaci Kedi - Primary School II; Gacin Munchika - Open Space`; Gongare Tila - Primary School I; Gongare Tila - Primary School II; Kasani Hurumi - Primary School I; Kasani Hurumi - Primary School II; Kwanar Kausani - Open Space; Kwari Manga - Open Space; Manga - Primary School I; Manga - Primary School II; Rege - Primary School I; Rege - Primary School II; Sabon Gari Michika - Primary School I; Sabon Gari Michika - Primary School II; Tsibirin Fangale - Primary School I; Tsibirin Fangale - Primary School II; Turari - Open Space
Wudil	Lajawa	Dadin Kowa - Open Space; Kauyawa - Primary School I; Kauyawa - Primary School II; Lajawa - Primary School I; Lajawa - Primary School II; Makera Dispensary; Mazare - Primary School; Sagame - Primary School; Yandama - Primary School; Tsoho Garu - Primary School; Yandoji - Primary School I; Yandoji - Primary School II; Yanduwatsu - Primary School
Wudil	Utai	Utai Bakin Kasuwa - Open Space I; Utai Bakin Kasuwa - Open Space II; Utai Bakin Kasuwa - Open Space III; Utai Bakin Kasuwa - Open Space IV; Utai Hurumi - Primary School I; Utai Hurumi - Primary School II; Utai Kawajin Magaji - Primary School; Utai Kawajin Madaki - Primary School; Utai Kofar Arewa - Open Space I; Utai Kofar Arewa - Open Space II; Utai Kofar Arewa - Open Space III
Wudil	Wudil	Gidan Makera - Open Space I; Gidan Makera - Open Space II; Hausawa Dugurawa - Open Space I; Hausawa Dugurawa - Open Space II; Hausawa Kofar Makama - Open Space I; Hausawa Kofar Makama - Open Space II; Kofar Fada Islamiyya - Islamiyya Primary School I; Kofar Fada Islamiyya - Islamiyya Primary School II; Kofar Fada L. E. D. - L. E. D. Pub. Buil. I; Kofar Fada L. E. D. - L. E. D. Pub. Buil. II; Kofar Yamma Kara - Open Space I; Kofar Yamma Kara - Open Space II; Kofar Yamma Makwalla - Open Space I; Kofar Yamma Makwalla - Open Space II; Prison Yard - Prison Yard; Unguwar Danya - Primary School I; Unguwar Danya - Primary School II; Unguwar Danya - Primary School III; Unguwar Danya - Primary School IV; Unguwar Madachi - Open Space I; Unguwar Madachi - Open Space II; Yandaudu Bakin Kogi - Open Space I; Yandaudu Bakin Kogi - Open Space II; Yandaudu Fagali - Primary School I; Yandaudu Fagali - Primary School II; Yandaudu Tundu Mahauta - Open Space I; Yandaudu Tundu Mahauta - Open Space II; Zango Gaban Komi - Open Space I; Zango Gaban Komi - Open Space II; Zango Tsohuwar Kasuwa - Open Space I; Zango Tsohowar Kasuwa - Open Space II
