= Umoh =

Origin
- Language: Ibibio/Efik
- Origin: Nigeria
- Meaning: Wealth or someone born during a festival
- Region of origin: South-south Nigeria

Other names
- Alternative spelling: Umo

UmohAudio is a masculine given name and surname of Ibibio origin which means "wealth". Umoh could also mean "someone who was born during a festival"

== Notable people with the name ==
- Ime Bishop Umoh (born 1983), Nigerian actor and comedian
- Jarlath Udoudo Umoh, Professor
- Ubong Essien Umoh, Nigerian Politician
- Stephanie Umoh (born 1986) actress
- Augustine Umoh, Nigerian professor, gynaecologist, obstetrician and Politician.
