= Ekpo =

Ekpo is a surname and given name. Notable people with the name include:

Surname:

- Akpan Hogan Ekpo (born 1954), Nigerian economist and professor
- Comfort Ekpo (born 1954), Nigerian Vice Chancellor at the University of Uyo
- Efioanwan Ekpo (born 1984), Nigerian female footballer
- Emmanuel Ekpo (born 1987), Nigerian footballer
- Felix Ekpo (born 1981), Nigerian weightlifter competing in the 77 kg category
- Florence Ekpo-Umoh (born 1977), Nigerian-German sprinter who specializes in the 400 metres
- Friday Ekpo (born 1969), Nigerian footballer
- Isaac Ekpo (born 1982), Nigerian boxer
- Margaret Ekpo (1914–2006), Nigerian women's rights activist
- Mfon Ekpo (born 1982), Nigerian entrepreneur and author
- Moses Ekpo, Nigerian politician, Deputy Governor of Akwa Ibom State

Given name:

- Bassey Ekpo Bassey (born 1949), Nigerian journalist, politician and traditional ruler of the Efik people of the Akwa Akpa kingdom
- Ekpo Eyo (1931–2011), Nigerian scholar mostly known for his work on archeology of Nigeria
- Ekpo Una Owo Nta, Nigerian lawyer and Chairman of the Independent Corrupt Practices and Other Related Offences Commission

== See also ==
- Etim Ekpo, town and Local Government Area in Akwa Ibom State, Nigeria
- Margaret Ekpo International Airport (IATA: CBQ, ICAO: DNCA), an airport serving Calabar in the Cross River State of Nigeria
