= Nyaudoh Ndaeyo =

Nigerian academic (born 1961)

Professor Nyaudoh Ndaeyo

Vice Chancellor of University of Uyo
- Incumbent
- Assumed office 2020
- Preceded by: Enefiok Essien

Personal details
- Born: 25 March 1961 (age 65)
- Education: University of Uyo

Nyaudoh Ukpabio Ndaeyo (born 25 March 1961) is a Nigerian professor of farm systems and the current vice chancellor of the University of Uyo.

== Background ==
Ndaeyo hails from Ini Local government area of Akwa Ibom State. He is married with two children.

== Education ==
Ndaeyo is an alumnus of the University of Uyo (formerly University of Cross River State) where he graduated with a First Class Honours degree in Agronomy. He previously obtained an Ordinary National Diploma in Agriculture from the College of Agriculture, Obubra.

He holds a doctor of philosophy degree in farm system, and a master's degree in agronomy both from University of Ibadan.

== Career ==
Ndaeyo served as head of the department, dean of the faculty of agriculture, chairman of the committee of deans, and deputy vice chancellor. He is a professor of farm systems and was appointed as the 8th substantive vice chancellor of the University of Uyo on 6 October 2022.
