= Oko Ita =

- HQuarters Town
- Interactive map of Oko Ita
- Coordinates: 5.210°N 7.883°E
- Country: Nigeria
- State: Akwa Ibom State
- LGA: Ibiono Ibom

Oka Ita is one of the major towns in Ibiono Ibom. It is the headquarters of Ibiono Ibom Local Government Area, Akwa Ibom State, Nigeria.

== Nearby places ==
- Ikot Uneke
- Ikpa Ikot Uneke
- Ekput
- Ibiatuk
- Ikot Inyang
- Ikot Ntung
- Atan Akpan Udom
- Urua Abasi
- Oil Palm Demo Farm, Ikot Okpoko
- Ikot Okpoko
- Ekim
- Ibiaku Ikot Oku
- Ikot Ekpene
- Ikot Obong
- Ikot Edung
- Nkot Mbuk
- Ikot Odiong
- Ikot Akpan Obong
- Ididep Usuk
- Ikot Antia
- Ibiaku Akpa Uton
- Idoro
- Mbiakpan
- Itu Ndem
- Mbak Atan.
