= Olatunde Alabi =

Nigerian consultant obstetrician and gynaecologist

Olatunde Oladeji Alabi is a Nigerian consultant obstetrician and gynaecologist. He is currently the Chief Medical Director of Federal Medical Centre, Lokoja.

== Early life and family ==
Olatunde Alabi was born on 5 March 1966 in Hadejia, Jigawa State. He is married to Dr. Olayinka Alabi with children.

== Education and career ==
He completed his primary education at St. Barnabas Primary School, Ilorin and obtained his secondary school certificate from Government Secondary School, Ilorin in 1981. He bagged a Bachelor of Medicine and Surgery (MBBS) degree from University of Ilorin, Kwara State in 1990. He was appointed as a Consultant Obstetrician and Gynaecologist in Federal Medical Centre, Lokoja, and served in several capacities since then until his appointment as CMD.
