= Kimse Okoko =

Kimse A. B. Okoko (c. 1940 – 13 September 2020) was a Nigerian political scientist. He was emeritus professor of political science at the University of Port Harcourt, a two-time President of the Ijaw National Congress (INC), and served as Pro-Chancellor and Chairman of the Governing Council of the University of Uyo. He also served as President of the Conference of Ethnic Nationalities in the Niger Delta. He hailed from Obunagha community, Yenagoa Local Government Area, Bayelsa State.

== Death ==
Okoko died on 13 September 2020 at a hospital in Port Harcourt, Rivers State, after a prolonged illness, six months after the death of his son Keniebi Okoko, a businessman and former Peoples Democratic Party governorship aspirant in Bayelsa State.
