= John Amanam =

Nigeria prosthetic artist

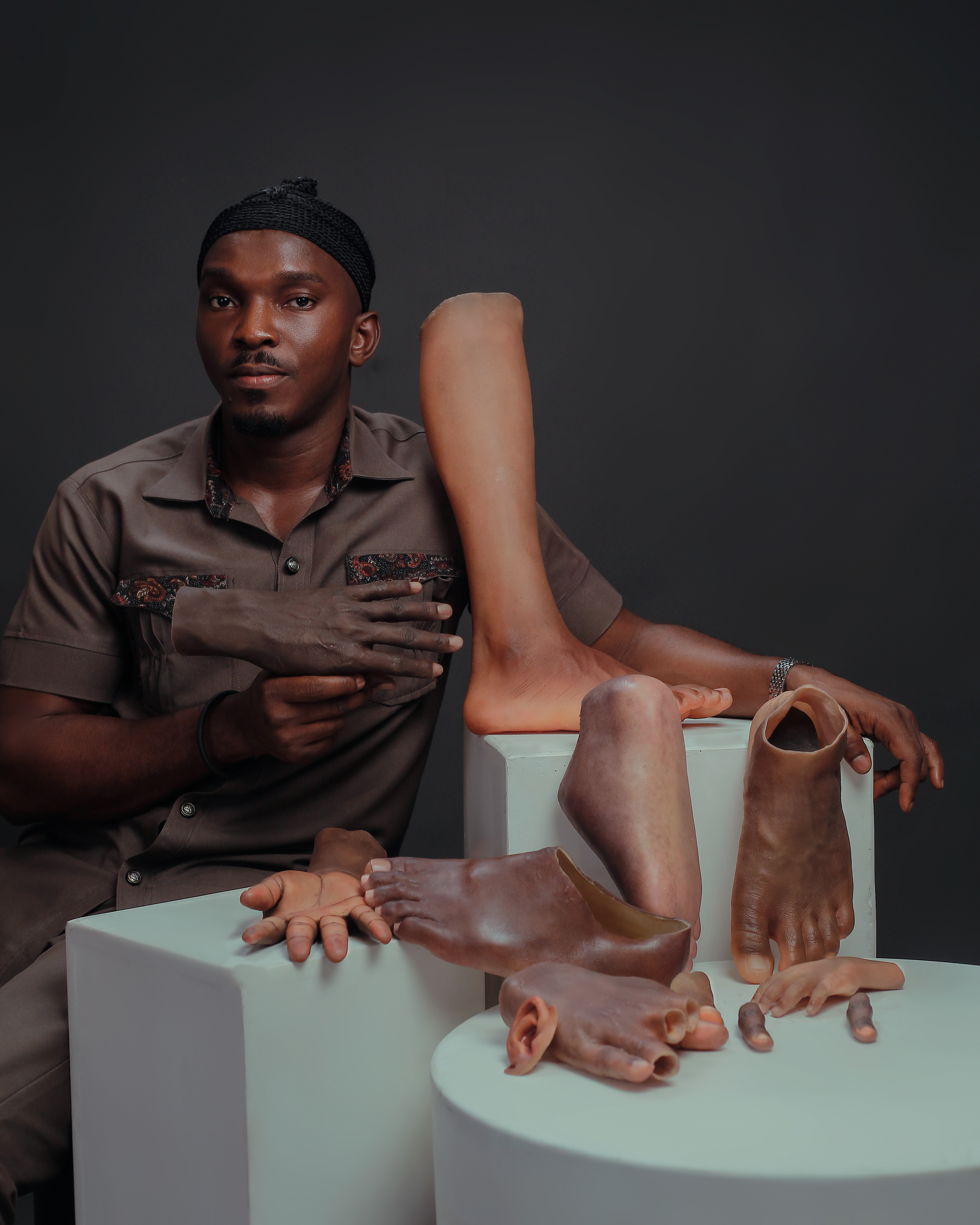
- Born: John Amanam Sunday; 14 November 1988 (age 37); Calabar, Cross River State, Nigeria
- Education: University of Uyo
- Occupations: Visual artist, prosthetic artist, special effects artist
- Years active: 2019–present
- Employer: Immortal Cosmetic Art Ltd
- Known for: Hyper-realistic prosthetic art; founder of Immortal Cosmetic Art Ltd
- Notable work: Hyper-realistic prosthetic limbs for darker skin tones
- Awards: Distinguished Artist of the Year – Society of Nigerian Artists (2025)
- Website: www.immortalcosmeticart.com

John Amanam (born 14 November 1988) is a Nigerian sculptor and hyper-realistic prosthetic artist who is credited as the first African to produce hyper-realistic prostheses.

== Early life and education ==
Originally from Nsit-Atai in Akwa Ibom state, South South, Amanam was born in Calabar, Cross River state where he also grew up. He is an alumnus of Federal Government College in Ikot Ekpene, and studied Fine and Industrial Arts at the University of Uyo.

== Career ==
Amanam is a former special effects artist in the Nollywood . He began his hyper-realistic prosthetic career after his brother lost part of his hand in 2018 and the prosthetic options available were starkly white ill-fitting both physically and culturally. His first prosthetic was produced in 2019 and he gave it to his brother.

He is the founder of Immortal Cosmetic Art Ltd a company that craft fingers, ears, noses, limbs and breast forms that look realistic on people of darker complexions, based in Uyo, Akwa Ibom State. He offers discounted and free services for low-income individuals through a donation-based initiative called Ubokobong, meaning “hand of God” in Ibibio.

His works have attracted International attention through featuring in International media outlets like Reuters, BBC, Al Jazeera and others . He has inspired an inclusive healthcare solutions designed in Africa, by Africans, for Africans and the global Black community.

== Achievements ==
- Nominated in the African Genius Awards 2024.
- won a national award for his university in Abuja for a project titled "Tomorrow" in 2014.
- Distinguished Artist of the Year by the Society of Nigerian Artists (SNA) in 2025

== See also ==
- Wole Soyinka
- Ngugi wa Thiong’o
- Denis Mukwege
- Haneefah Adam
