= Christopher Ekong =

Nigerian professor of Economics

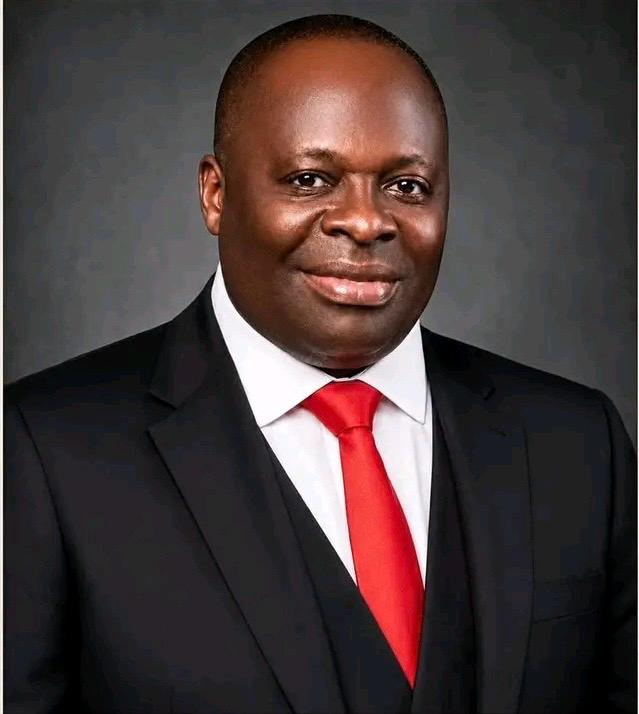
- Other name: Chris Ekong
- Citizenship: Nigerian
- Occupation: Economist

Christopher Ekong is a Nigerian professor of Economics and was appointed the 9th substantive vice chancellor of the University of Uyo on 30 April 2026. His appointment took effect from 16 June 2026. Before his appointment as VC, he was a former commissioner, special adviser and committee member in Akwa Ibom and has been lecturing at the University of Uyo since 1992.

== Education ==
He graduated from Harvard University in the United States and the Universities of Uyo and Port Harcourt in Nigeria. Ekong has also taken courses at several other institutes in the United States.
