= Federal Medical Centre, Lokoja =

Federal Medical Centre in Nigeria

Geography
- Location: Lokoja, Kogi State, Nigeria

Links
- Lists: Hospitals in Nigeria

Federal Medical Centre, Lokoja is a federal government of Nigeria medical centre located in Lokoja, Kogi State, Nigeria. The current chief medical director is Olatunde Alabi.

== History ==
Federal Medical Centre, Lokoja was established in 1999. The hospital was formerly known as General Hospital, Lokoja.

== Departments ==
Department of Accident and emergency

Department of surgery

Department of pharmacy

Department of medical laboratory

Department of physiotherapy

Department of ophthalmology

Department of paedratics

Department of radiology

Department of Psychiatry

Department of orthopedic

Department of nursing

Department of gynecology

Department of internal medicine

Department of NHIS FMC

Department of Hematology

Department of family medicine

Department of histopathology

Department of Morbid Anatomy

Department of dental

Department of clinical pathology

Department of clinical microbiology.

== CMD ==
The current chief medical director is Olatunde Alabi.

== Upgrade To Teaching Hospital ==
In March 2023, federal medical center lokoja was upgraded to teaching hospital by the former president Mohammed Buhari.
