= Comfort Ekpo =

Vice Chancellor in Nigeria

- Born: 12 November 1954 (age 71); Uyo, Akwa Ibom State
- Occupation: Vice Chancellor
- Spouse: Memfin Ekpo

Comfort Ekpo (born 12 November 1954) was a Nigerian Vice Chancellor at the University of Uyo.

== Life ==
Comfort Memfin Ekpo was born in Uyo in 1954. Her parents were Etim Udoh Isok and Nyong Sam Akpan. She worked her way up starting as a Sunday School teacher and serving as a Teaching Assistant at Cross River University from 1983 to 1991.She is married to Professor Memfin Ekpo.

Ekpo became the fourth Vice-Chancellor of the University of Uyo and also, the first female vice-chancellor. In December 2015, she was scheduled to leave as Professor Enefiok Essien had been identified as her successor. However, she wrote to the Minister of Education, Adamu Adamu to ask that the appointment of her successor be delayed. This was due to accusations of sexual assault and forgery allegedly made about Essien that were being discussed in the press.
