= University of Uyo =

University in Akwa Ibom State, Nigeria

Coordinates: 5.02809°N 7.97880°E

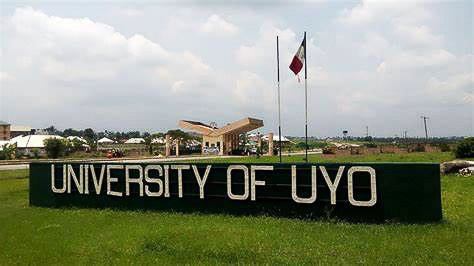
- Former names: University of Cross River State, Uyo
- Motto: Unity, Learning and Service
- Type: Public
- Established: 1991
- Chancellor: Adamu Maje, Emir of Hadejia
- Vice-Chancellor: Professor Christopher N. Ekong
- Academic staff: 1,521
- Administrative staff: 4,128
- Undergraduates: 127,980
- Postgraduates: 30,334
- Location: (Nigeria) Uyo, Akwa-Ibom State, Nigeria
- Campus: City
- Number of campuses: 4
- Website: uniuyo.edu.ng

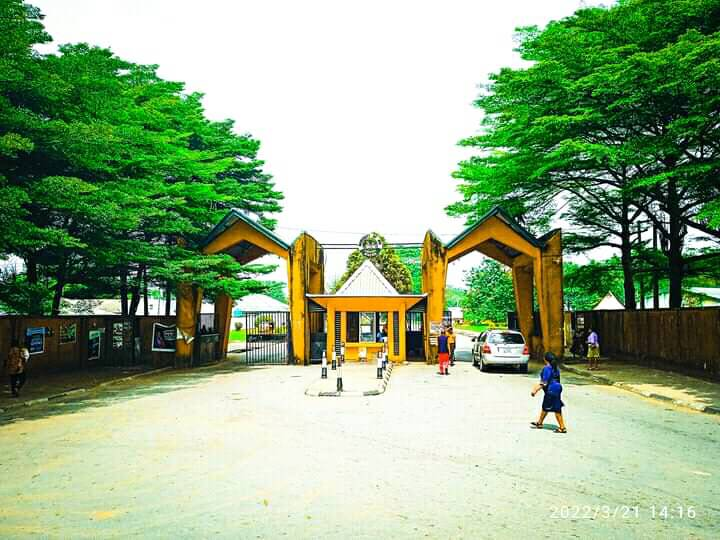
Entrance gate of University of Uyo campus

The University of Uyo is located in Uyo, the capital of Akwa Ibom State, Nigeria. The university was formerly known as the University of Cross River State.

On 1 October 1991, the Federal government of Nigeria established it as a Federal University and the name was changed to the University of Uyo. The university inherited students, staff, academic programmes and the entire facilities of the erstwhile University of Cross River State established by Cross River State in 1983. What is today the University of Uyo passed through several metamorphoses. It grew from a Teacher's College (TC) to an Advanced Teacher's College (ATC), College of Education (COE), which became an affiliate of the University of Port Harcourt to run degree programmes at a State University, University of Cross River State (UNICROSS), and then to its present status in 1991.

Academic activities commenced during the 1991/1992 academic session. The University of Uyo has 13 faculties, the postgraduate school and the school of Continuing Education.

Professor Enefiok Essien is a past Vice-Chancellor. In 2015 the Emir of Hadejia, Adamu Maje was appointed Chancellor.

Professor Nyaudoh Ukpabio Ndaeyo emerged as the 8th substantive Vice Chancellor of the University of Uyo in 2020.

Professor Christopher Ekong emerged as the 9th substantive Vice Chancellor of the University of Uyo in 2026.

== General information ==
The university is in the heart of Uyo, the capital of Akwa Ibom State, Nigeria's second-largest oil-producing state. Uyo is easily accessible by road, although there is an international airport for external use(s). It operates from four campuses:

- The Permanent Site/Main Campus which accommodates Parts of Central Administration, Faculties of Engineering and Natural and Applied Sciences, Faculty of Environmental Studies, Faculty of Agriculture, International Centre for Energy and Environmental Sustainability Research (ICEESR), and the Postgraduate School
- Town Campus: Situated within Uyo, this campus accommodates the Faculties of Arts, Education, Social Sciences, and Pharmacy. It also houses the University Library.
- The Annex Campus, home for the Business Administration, Law, and General Studies
- The Ime Umana Campus, Ediene Abak, which accommodates the Pre-Degree, JUPEB and other special courses.

The permanent site which houses the main campus of the university along Nwaniba Road is about 4.5 km from the city centre and covers an area of about 1,443 hectares (3,570 acres). The University of Uyo has 12 faculties, the School of Continuing Education and the Post Graduate School. The faculties are as follows:

1. Faculty of Agriculture
2. Faculty of Arts
3. Faculty of Basic Medical Sciences
4. Faculty of Business Administration
5. Faculty of Clinical Sciences
6. Faculty of Education
7. Faculty of Engineering
8. Faculty of Environmental Studies
9. Faculty of Law
10. Faculty of Science
11. Faculty of Social Sciences
12. Faculty of Pharmacy
13. Faculty of Communication and Media Studies
14. Faculty of Vocational Education, Library and Information Science

=== Faculties ===
S/N	Faculties
1	Faculty of Agriculture
2	Faculty of Arts
3	Faculty of Basic Medical Science
4	Faculty of Business Administration
5	Faculty of Clinical Science
6	Faculty of Education
7	Faculty of Engineering
8	Faculty of Environmental Studies
9	Faculty of Law
10	Faculty of Pharmacy
11	Faculty of Science
12	Faculty of Social Science
13	Faculty of Communication and Media Studies
14	Faculty of Vocational Education, Library and Information Science
15	Faculty of Computing
16	Faculty of Biological Science
17	Faculty of Physical Science

== Facilities ==
=== Library ===
The University Library has an active collection of 46,745 volumes and handles about 409,977 lending and reference inquiries annually. Current journals stand at 271 representing all disciplinary interests. The library is equipped with modern computers and has a reading space of 970.51 metres with a seating capacity of 698.

There are four main divisions: Acquisition, Lending, Processing, and Research. The Research Division comprises Reference, Serials, Special Collections and Government Collections. The Special Collection comprises Nyong Essien, Africana and Government Collection. Acquisition and Processing selects and orders library materials and organizes them for effective use. The Public Service Division deals directly with readers, regulates the use of library materials, and handles reference questions. The office of the university librarian provides data for planning, budgeting, control and coordination of the library.

=== Radio station ===
University of Uyo owns and operates a radio station, UNIUYO FM (100.7 MHz) in Uyo.

== Affiliate institutions ==
Below are a list of affiliate institutions of the University of Uyo, approved by the National Universities Commission (NUC).

- Akwa Ibom State College of Education, Afaha Nsit, Etinan. It was established on 10 January 1991 by the state government. The school initially had 179 students and 352 staff. The college offers programs in Agriculture, Sciences, Technology, Social Sciences and Commerce. The college is current affiliated with the University of Uyo to run a degree program both full time and part time.
- St. Joseph Major Seminary, Ikot Ekpenel
- Assemblies of God Divinity School, Old Umuahia
- The Apostolic Church Theological Seminary, Amumara
- The Samuel Bill Theological College, Abak
- Topfaith University, Mkpatak
- Osun State College of Education, Ila-Orangun (Regular)

== Vice chancellors ==
- Professor Fola Lasisi
- Professor Akpan Hogan Ekpo
- Professor Akaneren Essien
- Professor Comfort Memfin Ekpo
- Professor Enefiok Essien
- Professor Nyaudoh Ndaeyo
- Professor Christopher Ekong

=== Deputy Vice Chancellors ===
- Prof. Aniekan Offiong, Faculty of Engineering, DVC, Administration
- Reverend Sister (Prof.) Anthonia Essien, Faculty of Arts, DVC, Academics.

== Notable alumni ==
- Bassey Albert, politician
- John Amanam, sculptor and hyper-realistic prosthetic artist
- Valerie Ebe, lawyer and politician
- Ini Edo, actress
- Inibehe Effiong, human rights lawyer, activist, social commentator, and litigation lawyer
- Ini Ememobong, politician, linguist, public relations
- Michael Enyong, politician
- Onofiok Luke, politician
- El Mafrex, urban gospel singer-songwriter
- Aniebiet Inyang Ntui, EU Ambassador, University Librarian of University of Calabar and Professor of Library and Information Science
- Emeka Onowu, politician
- John James Akpan Udo-Edehe, politician
- Ime Bishop Umoh, actor
- Ubong Essien Umoh, politician, university lecturer

== Notable faculty ==
- Akpan Hogan Ekpo Professor of Economics and Public Policy; former Head of Department of Economics, Dean of Faculty of Social Sciences, Deputy Vice Chancellor and then Vice Chancellor of the university from 2000 to 2005)
- Joshua Uzoigwe Music
