= Inibehe Effiong =

Nigerian lawyer

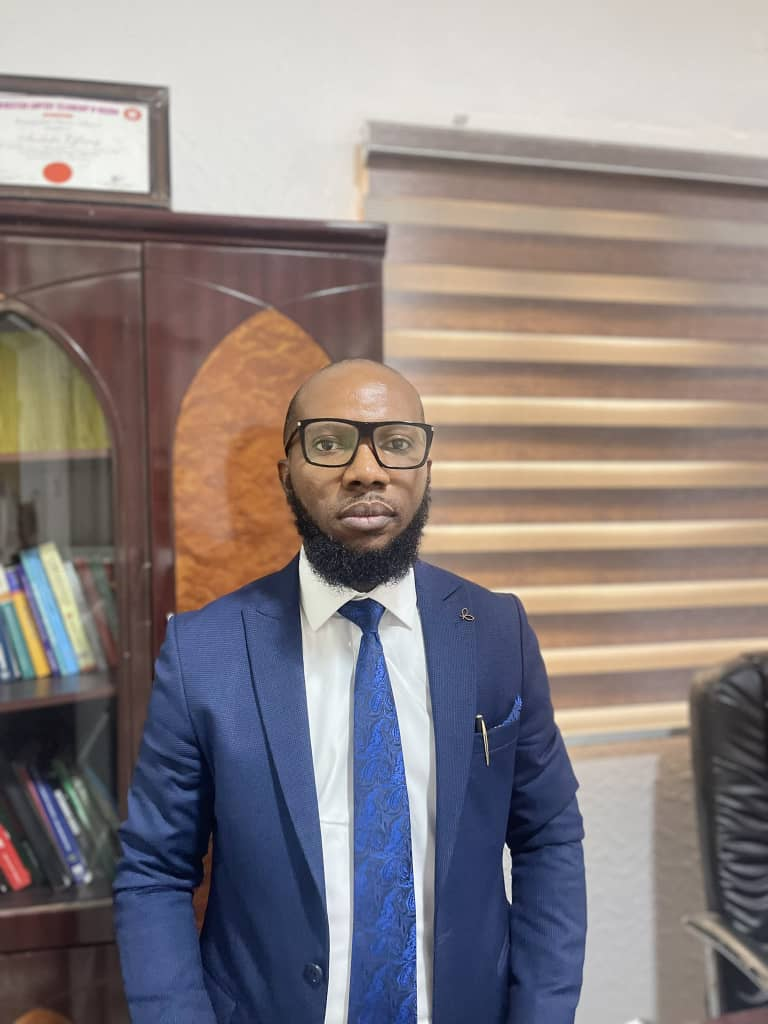
- Born: Inibehe Effiong; 21 December 1988 (age 37); Akwa Ibom State, Nigeria
- Education: University of Uyo
- Occupations: Lawyer; human rights activist

Inibehe Effiong (born 21 December 1988), is a Nigerian human rights lawyer, activist, social commentator, and litigation lawyer. He is the legal adviser of the African Action Congress.

== Early life ==
Effiong was born in Akwa Ibom State, Nigeria in 1988. He attended the Presbyterian Senior Science School and proceeded to the University of Uyo, where he obtained a Bachelor of Law degree and was call to bar in 2015.

== Activism ==
In August 2020, Effiong filed a charge against the National Broadcasting Commission for arbitrarily amending the Nigeria Broadcasting Code and increasing the fine for hate speech from NGN 500,000 to NGN 5,000,000.

From 5 June 2021, to 13 January 2022, the Federal Government of Nigeria banned Twitter, which restricted its operation in the country. Inibehe filed a suit at the federal high court against the Federal Government of Nigeria, former Minister of Information and Culture, Lai Mohammed, and the then Attorney-General and Minister of Justice, Abubakar Malami, to obtain an order restraining the government from banning Twitter.

In March 2023, Effiong criticised Nigeria's State Security Services for adopting the name Department of State Security Services and considered it illegal.

== Detention ==
On 27 July 2022, the Chief Judge of Akwa Ibom State, Ekaette Obot, ordered Effiong to be remanded in prison for contempt. While in a correctional facility, he claimed to have been subjected to torture by the prison official, but the claim was refuted by the Nigerian Correctional Service.

The imprisonment of Inibehe generated national controversies as human rights organizations, including Socio-Economic Rights and Accountability Project and Amnesty International, Nigeria Labour Congress called for Inibehe's release. At least 26 civil society organisations calling for Inibehe's release submitted a petition to the United Nations High Commissioner for Human Rights in Geneva.

The Nigerian Bar Association threatened to file a petition with the National Judicial Council, and many notable Nigerian lawyers, including Senior Advocates of Nigeria such as Femi Falana and Kayode Ajulo, condemned Effiong's detention. Kayode Ajulo described Effiong’s imprisonment as "an abuse of judicial authority."

Human rights lawyer and writer, Professor Chidi Odinkalu, described Effiong as “a courageous, vigorous, and brilliant advocate who is destined to become a phenomenon in Nigeria’s legal profession.”

== Awards and recognition ==
Effiong received several awards and recognitions base on human rights, social justice and democracy in the Nation, such as, 2022 Gani Fawehinmi Outstanding Impact Award.
