= Binyaminu Usman Polytechnic =

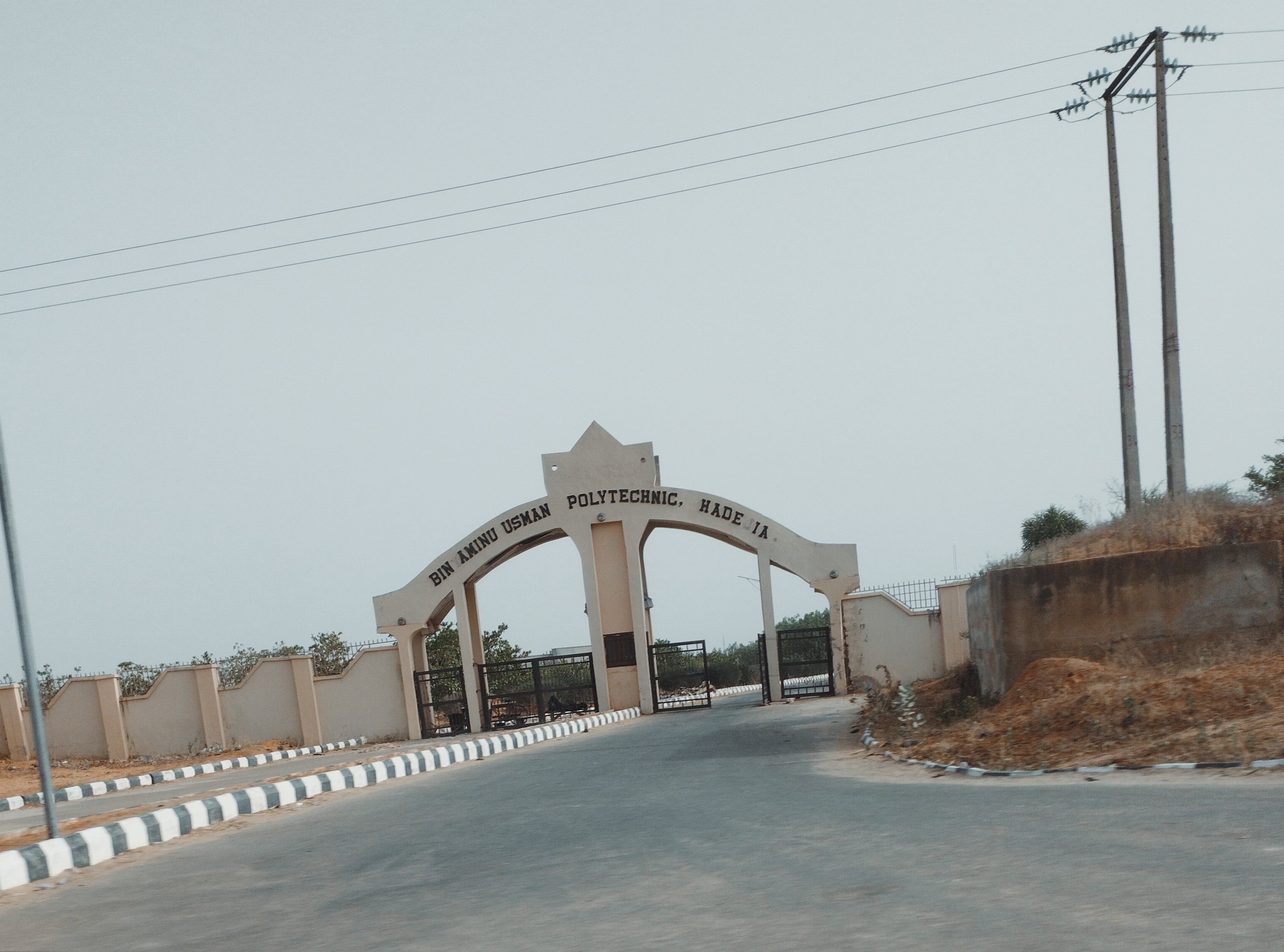
- Type: Public
- Established: 1992
- Rector: Prof Bashir Garba Mukhtar
- Location: Hadejia, Jigawa State, Nigeria
- Website: Official website

The Binyaminu Usman Polytechnic (BUPOLY) is a state government higher education institution located in Hadejia, Jigawa State, Nigeria. The current Rector is Prof Bashir Garba Mukhtar.

== History ==
The Binyaminu Usman Polytechnic was established in 1992.

== Courses ==
The institution offers the following courses;

- Fisheries Technology
- Forestry Technology
- Horticultural Technology
- Production Tech
- Computer Engineering
- Wildlife and Eco-Tourism
- Electrical/Electronic Engineering Technology
- Business Administration and Management
- Computer Science
- Home and Rural Economics
- Agricultural Technology
- Animal Health And Production Technology
- Statistics
