= Valerie Ebe =

Nigerian lawyer and politician

Deputy Governor of Akwa Ibom State
- In office 3 November 2012 – 29 May 2015
- Preceded by: Nsima Ekere
- Succeeded by: Moses Ekpo

Personal details
- Born: 26 March 1947 (age 79) Mkpat Enin, Uyo, Akwa Ibom State, Nigeria
- Party: People's Democratic Party
- Spouse: Mkpisong Maurice Ebe (wid.)
- Education: University of Nigeria, Nsukka, University of Uyo
- Occupation: Lawyer; Politician

Valerie Maurice Ebe (née Bassey; born 26 March 1947), is a Nigerian lawyer and politician who was the first female Deputy Governor of Akwa Ibom State.

== Early life and education ==
Ebe was born on the 26 March 1947 to Edidem Paul Bassey, the provincial ruler of Etoi Clan. She attended the Holy Child Primary School, Calabar and was admitted into Holy Child Secondary School, Calabar in 1957 for her secondary school education. She later trained to be a teacher at the Holy Child Teacher Training College, Ifuho. She studied History and Archaeology at the University of Nigeria, Nsukka and later studied law at the University of Uyo. She was admitted as a Barrister and Solicitor of the Supreme Court of Nigeria in 1998.
