= Ibiono-Ibom =

- LGA
- Interactive map of Ibiono-Ibom
- Location in Nigeria
- Coordinates: 5°14′0″N 7°53′0″E
- Country: Nigeria
- State: Akwa Ibom State
- Capital: Oko Ita

Government
  - Chairman: Rt.Hon. Asuakak Udo Umoh
  - Vice Chairman: Hon.Mercy Ita Ubon
  - Leader of the 8th Legislative Council: Rt.Hon.Idorenyin Umoren
  - Paramount Ruler: HRM, Okuku (Dr) Ime Udousoro Inyang, jp (Ibom Ibiono Ibom)

Area
  - Total: 336.0 km^{2} (129.7 sq mi)

Population (2022)
  - Total: 240,700
  - Density: 716.4/km^{2} (1,855/sq mi)
- Time zone: UTC+1 (WAT)

Ibiono-Ibom is a prominent Local Government Area of Akwa Ibom State in the south-south region of Nigeria. It has its administrative headquarters at Oko Ita. In the early 1980s, Edet Akpaudo build an outstanding upstairs in Ibiaku Awat Nkang village.

== Geography ==
The territorial unit and geographical area addressed and known as Ibiono Ibom, consists of 9 clans, 33 groups, and 193 villages. It covers a total land surface of 2761.76 sq. kilometres, with a total estimated population of 385,145. It is bounded by Odukpani Local Government Area (Cross River State), Arochukwu Local Government Area (Abia State), Itu, Ikono, Uyo and Ini Local Government Areas (Akwa Ibom State).

=== Cities and towns ===
Oko Ita is the local government headquarters of Ibiono-Ibom.

Some of the more prominent towns include: Obio Ibiono, Okopedi Use Ikot Oku, Idoro, Ididep, Afaha Obio Eno, Ikot Usen, Utit Obio, Ono, Afua, Use Ndon, Ikpanya, Aka Ikot Udo Eno, Ikot Okpoko, Urua Abasi and Itukho.

=== Administrative areas ===
Ibiono Ibom is divided into 9 clans:

CLAN	Website
Afaha Clan
Ibiaku Clan
Ididep Clan	http://www.ididep.org.ng/
Idoro Clan
Ikpanya Clan
Mbiabong Clan
Ntan Clan
Use Clan
Utit Obio Clan

== History ==
The region of the local government was created out of Itu Local government Area in December 1996.

This area is where the Scottish Missionary Mary Slessor died in 1915. Her Cairn is located at Use Ikot Oku, where she lived.

=== Politics ===
Politics in Ibiono Ibom is dominated by the people from the central part of Ibiono. The political landscape of the town is dominated by the People's Democratic Party (Nigeria). The traditional leadership of the people is anchored by the paramount leader, known as "Okuku" of Ibiono Ibom.

== Demography ==
The people are predominantly of the Christian faith.

The main ethnic group of the LGA are the Ibibio people, who speak a dialect of the Ibibio language. The Ibibio language belongs to the Benue–Congo language family, which forms part of the Niger–Congo group of languages.

Despite the homogeneity of the Ibibio, no central government existed among the people of the present day Ibiono-Ibom LGA prior to the colonial British invasion in 1904.

When Ibiono Ibom LGA was created in 1996, Oko Ita was chosen as the local government headquarters to spread development to all regions of the LGA.

== Prominent people from Ibiono Ibom ==
Some prominent people of Akwa Ibom State and in Nigeria are from Ibiono Ibom LGA. They include:

- Cardinal Ekanem, First Nigeria Roman Catholic Cardinal.
- Obong (Major General) Phillip Effiong, Akankang Ibiono Ibom. He served in various positions in the Nigerian Army including the Ordinance corps before the second coup where the Head of state Ironsi was killed. He also Served under the Biafran Government from 1967 to 1970, Obong Phillip Effiong served as Chief of Logistics, Chief of Staff, Commandant of the Militia, and Chief of General Staff. He was the first Vice President and Second President of the defunct country.
- Obong Ntieyong Udo Akpan OFR is another son of the area who served as Secretary to the Government of Biafra. He was a prolific writer that wrote many books, among them are "The Wooden Gong", "Public Administration in Nigeria", "The Reservoir", "IniAbasi and the Sacred Ram" and "The Struggle for Secession, 1966–1970: A Personal Account of the Nigerian Civil War". He is also an uncle to Prof. Enefiok Essien (SAN), a Nigerian professor, lawyer, and from 2015 to 2020 the Vice Chancellor of the University of Uyo."Who's Who in Nigeria 1861 -". 27 October 2016.
- Joe Udofia is a Nigerian entrepreneur and philanthropist. He is the President & CEO of Vandrezzer Energy Services Limited, and Chairman of Nigerian Club, Vandrezzer FC . He is also the founder of The Joe Udofia Foundation, a foundation committed to creating opportunities for youth and providing support for the less privileged in the society.

== Political Wards ==
Wards	Ward Centers
Ikpanya	Primary Sch., Esit Ikpanya
Ibiono Central 1	Primary Sch., Ikot Aba
Ibiono Central 2	Utit Obio Primary Sch., Ikot Inyang
Ibiono Eastern 1	Pri. Sch. Use Ikot Oku
Ibiono Eastern 2	Village Square, Ididep Usuk
Ibiono Eastern 3	Senior Sec. Sch., Ikot Nko
Ibiono Western 1	Primary Sch., Nsan
Ibiono Western 2	Pri. Sch., Use Ndon
Ibiono Western 3	Primary Sch., Ikot Udo Ibiono
Ibiono Northern 1	Primary School, Afua
Ibiono Northern 2	Primary Sch., Idoro
Ibiono Southern 1	Primary Sch., Ikot Mbang
Ibiono Southern 2	Primary Sch., Ikot Osukpong
