= Akpan Hogan Ekpo =

Nigerian economist and professor

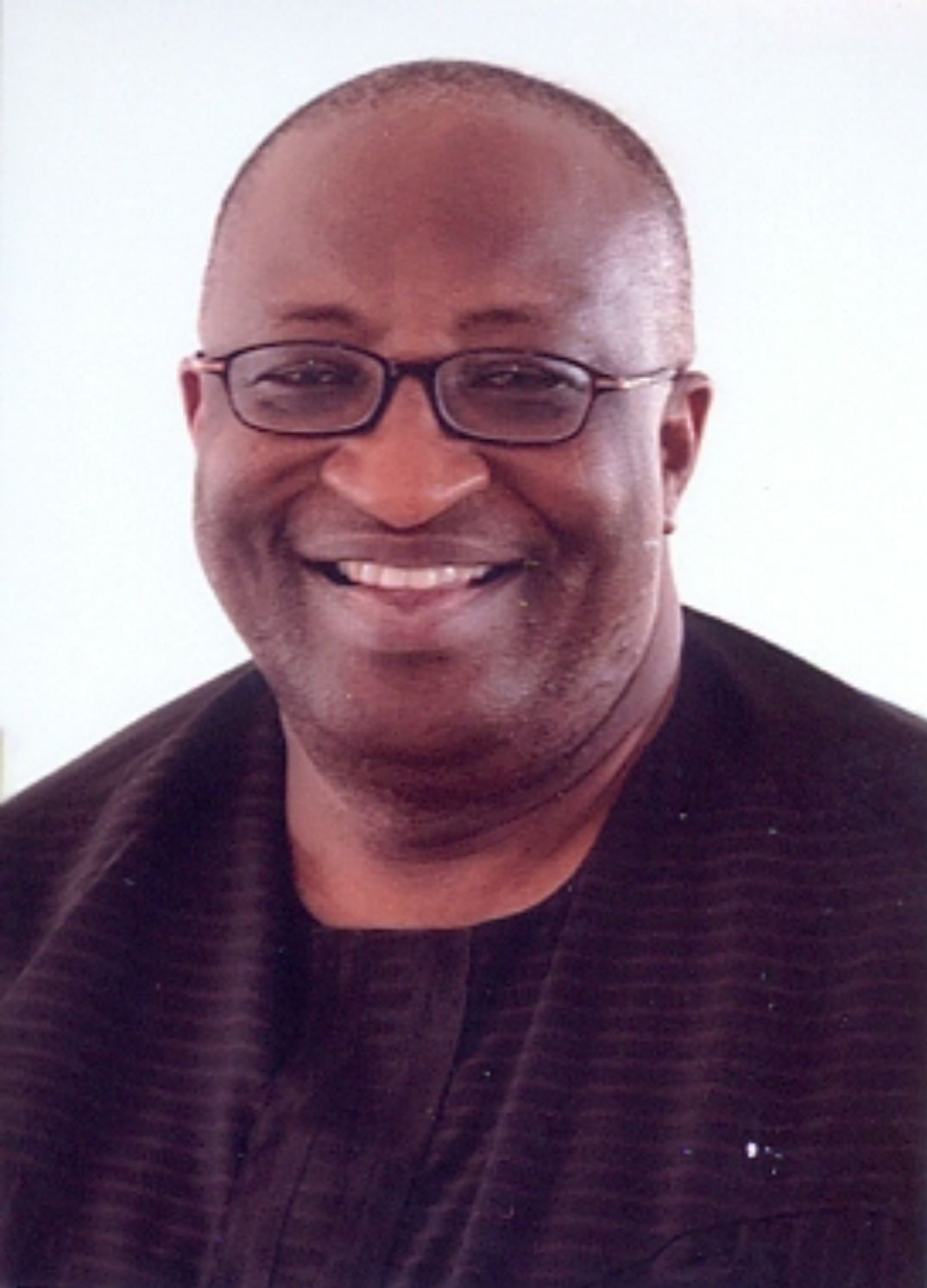
- Born: 26 June 1954 (age 72); Lagos, Nigeria
- Education: Howard University, Northwestern University, University of Pittsburgh
- Occupations: Economist, Professor
- Spouse: Njeri Mbaka Ekpo (m. 1977)
- Website: www.akpanekpo.com

Akpan Hogan Ekpo (born 26 June 1954) is a Nigerian economist and professor. He is an emeritus professor of economics and public policy at the University of Uyo, Akwa Ibom State, Nigeria. Ekpo is also the chairman of the Foundation for Economic Research and Training (FERT) in Lagos, Nigeria. He was the director general of the West African Institute for Financial and Economic Management (WAIFEM) in Lagos, Nigeria from May 2009 to December 2018. He is a former vice-chancellor of the University of Uyo, Akwa Ibom State, Nigeria. Ekpo is also a former director at the Central Bank of Nigeria.

== Early life ==
Akpan Hogan Ekpo was born in Lagos, Nigeria to Hogan Ekpo Etuknwa (1917–1997) who was a policeman and Deaconess Affiong Harrison Hogan Ekpo (née Udosen) (1936–2019). He is the oldest of four children. Ekpo originally hails from Ikot Obio Eka in Etinan Local Government of Area of Akwa Ibom State, Nigeria. Ekpo attended Anglican Isoko Primary School, Marine Beach, Apapa, Lagos from 1959 to 1965. From 1965 to 1970 he attended United Christian Secondary School, Bombay Crescent, Apapa, Lagos. After completing his secondary school education, Ekpo received a scholarship from the Federal Government of Nigeria to attend University in the United States of America.

== Career ==
Ekpo attended the prestigious Howard University in Washington, DC where he received Bachelor of Arts and Master of Arts degrees in Economics in 1976 and 1978 respectively. He also attended Northwestern University, Evanston, Illinois under the American Economic Association Fellowship Award in 1975. In 1983, he obtained a PhD in Economics from the University of Pittsburgh, Pennsylvania.

Ekpo lectured at North Carolina Agricultural and Technical State University, Greensboro, North Carolina from 1981 to 1983. He returned to Nigeria in 1983. From 1983 to 1989 he was a lecturer at the University of Calabar, Calabar, Nigeria where he quickly rose up the ranks becoming a senior lecturer in 1987. From 1990 to 1992, Ekpo was a visiting professor, Department of Economics, University of Zimbabwe, Harare, Zimbabwe. He was an associate professor and head, Department of Economics, University of Abuja, Abuja, Nigeria from January to July 1992. In February 1992, he became professor, Department of Economics, University of Abuja.

Ekpo became the dean of Faculty of Management Sciences of the university in July 1992. In September 1994, Ekpo returned to his home state of Akwa Ibom where he became the Head of the Department of Economics at the University of Uyo, Uyo. In 1997 he became the Dean, Faculty of Social Sciences. In 1999, he was appointed the Deputy Vice-chancellor of the University of Uyo. He was appointed the Vice-Chancellor of the University of Uyo in May 2000. He held this position until May 24, 2005. In May 2009, he was appointed the director general of the West African Institute for Financial and Economic Management (WAIFEM) in Lagos, Nigeria. Ekpo held this position until December 2018.

Ekpo has over 200 publications comprising refereed journal articles, books, chapters in books, conference proceedings and other research outlets;. He has consulted (still consulting) for several national and international organizations such as the National Planning Commission of Nigeria, The World Bank, International Monetary Fund (IMF), Economic Commission for Africa (ECA), African Economic Research Consortium (AERC) in Kenya, Global Network in India, Forum of Federations in Canada, among others. He has advised all levels of government (Municipal, State and Federal) in Nigeria. Between 1995 and 1999, he was chairman, Ministerial Advisory Committee, Federal Ministry of Finance, Abuja. He was the technical adviser to the Vision 2010 Committee. He was editor of the prestigious Nigerian Journal of Economics and Social Studies from 1997 to 2003. Ekpo was once the chairman of Akwa Ibom Investment and Industrial Promotion Council (AKIIPOC), Uyo, Akwa Ibom State. He has served in various government boards and boards of companies, notably the Utilities Commission in Abuja and the Central Bank of Nigeria (2004–09). He was also a member of the Monetary Policy Committee of the Central Bank of Nigeria (2004–09). In 2002, Ekpo was conferred with the National Productivity Order of Merit Award by the President of Nigeria.

Ekpo was a member of the National Economic Management team in Abuja, member of the steering committee of Vision 2020 and a former president of the Nigerian Economic Society. He belongs to several professional associations such as the Nigerian Economic Society, American Economic Association, Royal Economic Society in the United Kingdom, African Finance and Economic Association, International Institute for Public Finance, Nigerian Statistical Association, among others. He is member of the board of the African Institute for Applied Economics, and the Clement Isong Foundation in Nigeria. Ekpo is a Fellow of the Nigerian Economic Society.

== Selected honors ==
- Who's Who Among Students in American Universities and Colleges, 1975.
- Selected as an Outstanding Young Man Of America, 1977
- Cited in the International Biographies, Cambridge, England, 1977
- Cited in Notable Americans, 1978.
- Senate Research Grant 1983/84 – University of Calabar, Nigeria.
- Senate Research Grant 1985/86 – University of Calabar, Nigeria.
- Research Board Grant 1991, University of Zimbabwe, Harare.
- African Economic Research Consortium grant, 1992–1996.
- Chief Anthony A. Ani's Professorial Chair in Public Finance, University of Uyo, 1998 to 2001.
- National Productivity Order of Merit Award by The president of Nigeria 2001.
- Dr. Kwame Nkrumah AFRICAN LEADERSHIP AWARD 2003, Accra, Ghana.
- Commendation by the National Universities Commission (NUC) for satisfactory performance as vice-chancellor, University of Uyo, 2000–2005.
- Fellow, Nigerian Economic Society

Ekpo's areas of interest are; Economic Theory, (Microeconomics and Macroeconomics), Economic Development, Public Finance and Quantitative Economics.

== Personal life ==
While attending post graduate school at Howard University, Ekpo met Njeri Mbaka, a fellow Howard student from Kenya. They have been married for over 45 years. They have four children and ten grandchildren. On 26th June, 2024 Ekpo retired from academics after a distinguished career of more than four decades.
