= Ikot Obio Eka =

- Village
- Interactive map of Ikot Obio Eka
- Country: Nigeria
- State: Akwa Ibom
- Local Government Area: Etinan
- Time zone: UTC+1 (WAT)

Ikot Obio Eka is a village in Etinan local government area of Akwa Ibom State, Nigeria
