= Ubong Essien Umoh =

Nigerian politician

Prof. Ubong Essien Umoh

Commissioner for Education, Akwa Ibom State
- Incumbent
- Assumed office February 2025
- Appointed by: Umo Bassey Eno

Personal details
- Occupation: Politician, Academic, public administrator
- Profession: Historian, professor

Ubong Essien Umoh is a Nigerian politician, academic and public administrator who has served as the Commissioner for Education, Akwa Ibom State since his appointment in February 2025. He is a professor of history (specialising in military and peace history) and a faculty member associated with the University of Uyo prior to his appointment to the Akwa Ibom State Executive Council.

== Career ==
=== Academic career ===
Umoh served in the education sector as a lecturer and researcher before his appointment as commissioner. His research interests include military history, peace history and related fields. He has authored and co-authored academic publications spanning conflict studies, peace theory, and the socio-political dimensions of African security.

=== Political career ===
Ubong was appointed Commissioner for Education by Governor Umo Eno in February 2025.

== Selected publications ==
- “Resource Curse” and “Resource Wars” and the Proliferation of Small Arms in Africa.
- Cameroon, Nigeria and the Bakassi Conflict: Building Blocks for a Non-Democratic Peace Theory.
- Private Military Contractors, War Crimes and International Humanitarian Law.
- The Sapir–Whorf Hypothesis and the Conceptualisation of Peace Using Adjectives.
