= Augustine Umoh =

Nigerian professor and politician

Augustine Vincent Umoh is a Nigerian professor, gynaecologist, Obstetrician and politician who served as the Commissioner for Health in Akwa Ibom State. He was appointed by Governor Udom Emmanuel August, 2020 and was reappointed by Governor Umo Eno in July 2023. He is now the Delivery Advisor for the State Specialist Hospital and General Hospital in Ikono.

== Early and education ==
Umoh was born in Okopedi Ibianang, Ikono Local Government Area in Akwa Ibom State. He is married to Rosemary Augustine Umoh and are blessed with Children. Augustine completed his primary education at Primary School, Uyo Obio, Akwa Ibom State. He had his secondary education from 1978 to 1983 at Federal Government College Ikot Ekpene. He obtained his MBBS degree at the College of Medicine, University of Lagos from 1984 to 1990, and completed his one-year Housemanship at the Lagos University Teaching Hospital and the National Youth Service Corps (NYSC) at the General Hospital, Anka in the Zamfara state of Nigeria. He obtained his postgraduate diploma in reproductive health from the Liverpool School of Tropical Medicine (LSTM), United Kingdom in 2001, and was also conferred with the Fellowship of the West African College of Surgeons in the Faculty of Obstetrics and Gynaecology in 2002. He is also a Fellow of the International College of Surgeons and holds a certificate in Economic Evaluation in Global Health from the University of Washington.

== Political career ==
In 2020, Augustine was appointed as the Commissioner for Health in Akwa Ibom State. He was appointed by Governor Udom Emmanuel, with reappointment in July 2023 by Governor Umo Eno. He currently serves as the Delivery Advisor for the State Specialist Hospital and General Hospital in Ikono.
