= Enefiok Essien =

Nigerian professor, lawyer and university chancellor

Enefiok Essien (SAN) (born 29 January 1960 in Ibiono-Ibom, Akwa Ibom) is a Nigerian professor, lawyer and Was the Vice Chancellor of the University of Uyo.

== Background ==
Enefiok Effiong Essien was born on 29 January 1960 in Ibiono-Ibom local government of Akwa Ibom. He was born into the family of Effiong Okon and Ayie-Ubok James Essien.

== Education ==
In 1984, he graduated with a Bachelor of Laws with honors from the University Calabar, Nigeria. In 1985 he attended Nigerian Law School, Lagos and graduated with Business Level law degree and in 1988 he attended University of Lagos and graduated with a Master of Laws.

In 1998 he obtained a Doctor of Philosophy in law from University Birmingham, England.

== Career ==
He is a lawyer, professor of law and the immediate past Vice Chancellor of University of Uyo.

== Awards and nominations ==
- Senior Advocate of Nigeria, SAN.
