= Hadejia =

Hadejia Biram
- LGA and town
- Nickname: Ginsau Birnin Doki
- Motto: Majestic City of Stallion
- Interactive map of Hadejia
- Location within Nigeria
- Coordinates: 12°27′N 10°2′E
- Country: Nigeria
- State: Jigawa State

Government
  - Local Government Chairman: Abdulkadir Umar (APC)

Population (2022)
  - Total: 179,300
- Time zone: UTC+1 (WAT)

Haɗejiya (also Haɗeja, previously Biram) is a Hausa town in eastern Jigawa State, northern Nigeria. Hadejia lies between latitude 12.4506N and longitude 10.0404E. It shares boundary with Kiri Kasama Local Government to the east, Mallam Maɗori Local Government from to the north, and Auyo Local Government to the west. The Hadejia Local Government consist of eleven (11) political wards, namely: Atafi, Dubantu, Gagulmari, Kasuwar Ƙofa, Kasuwar Kuda, Matsaro, Majema, Rumfa, Sabon Garu, Ƴankoli and Yayari. Inhabitants are dominantly Hausa, Fulani and Kanuri with some other groups such as Tiv, Yoruba, Igbo, Igala etc. The dominant occupation of the inhabitants is crop-farming and animal rearing which a considerable percentage, engaged in trading, fishing and services including civil service. The people of Haɗeja are largely Muslims, although some follow indigenous belief systems. The town lies to the north of the Hadejia River, and is upstream from the Hadejia-Nguru wetlands. Hadejia is an internationally important ecological and sensitive zone.

Hadejia was once known as Biram, and is referred to as one of the "seven true Hausa states" (Hausa Bakwai), because it was ruled by the descendants of the Hausa mythological figure Bayajidda and his second wife, Daurama. By 1810, during the Fulani War, the Hausa rulers of the Hausa Bakwai had all been overcome by the Fulani. Haɗeja had been transformed into an emirate two years earlier, in 1808. In 1906 Haɗeja resisted British occupation, under the then Emir (Muhammadu Mai-Shahada). Haɗejiya was absorbed into Jigawa State in 1991 from Kano State.

The Haɗeja is home to majorly 4 tertiary institutions, which are: Binyaminu Usman Polytechnic Hadejia, School of Nursing Hadejia, National Teachers Institutes Hadejia Study Centre.

== Agricultural products ==
Hadejia town, a market center for cotton, millet, sorghum, fish, and rice, is an export crop for peanuts. Locals maintain cattle, goats, guinea fowl, sheep, and donkeys. It is connected to the main highway and railway.

== Climate ==
The climate has a blistering, cloudy dry season with temperatures ranging from 15 °C (59 °F) to 41 °C (105 °F), as well as a hot, oppressive rainy season with predominantly cloudy skies.

== Air pollution ==
Hadejia's air undergoes significant changes due to the presence of dust and particulate matter, which pose significant health risks due to their small size and potential inhalation into the lungs.

== Gallery ==
=== Commerce and administration ===
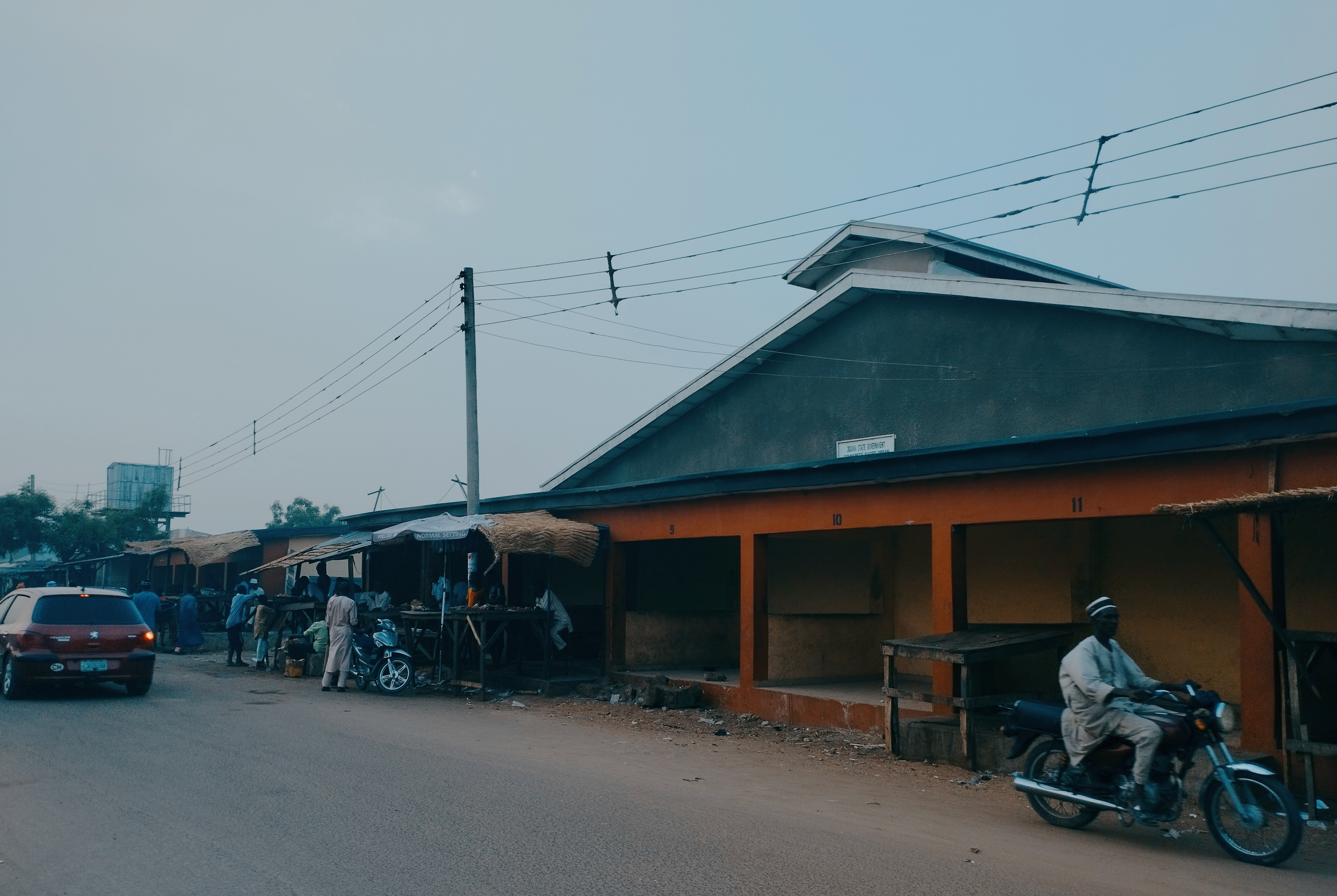
Meat market Hadejia

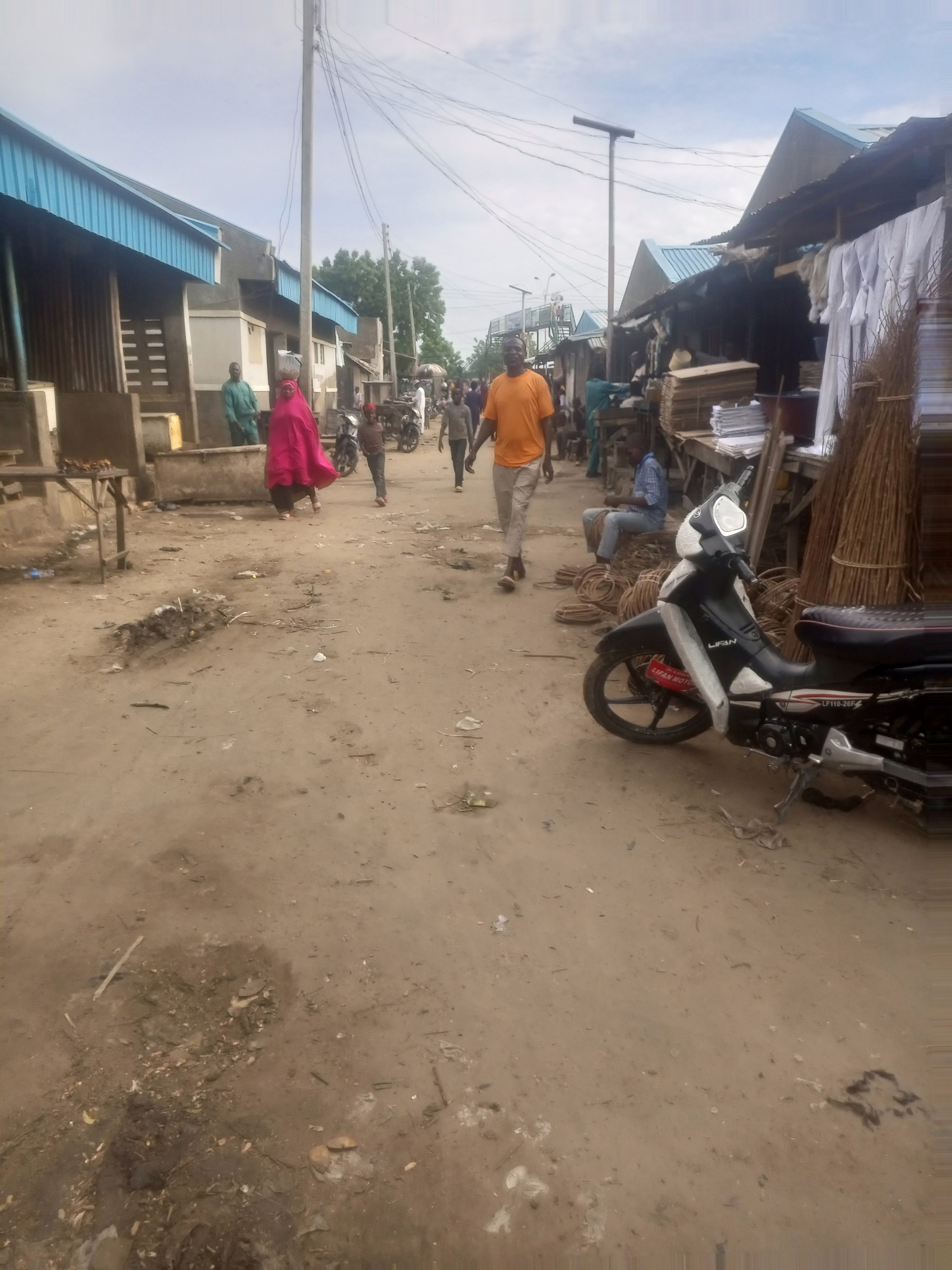
Hadejia fish market

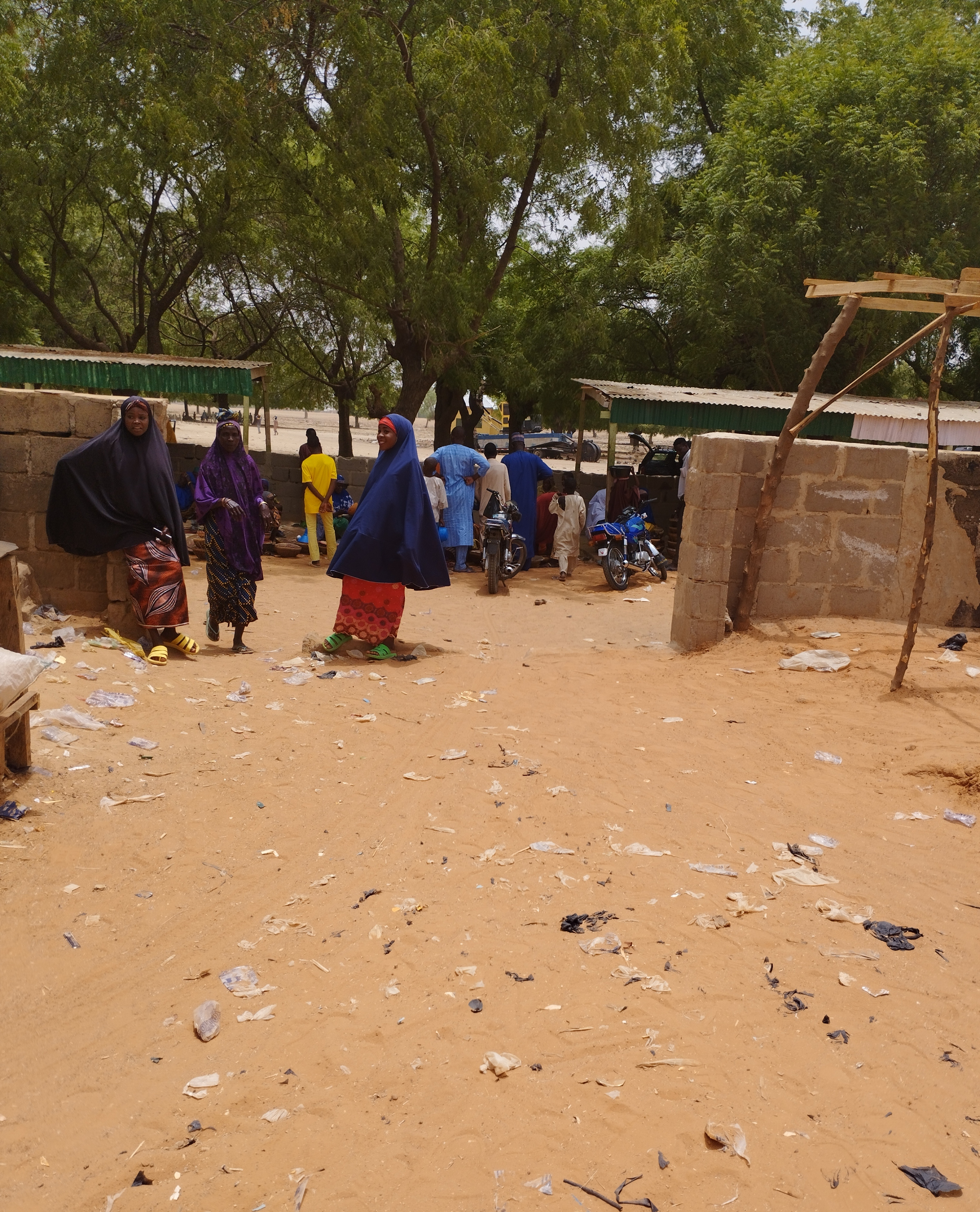
Milk market Hadejia

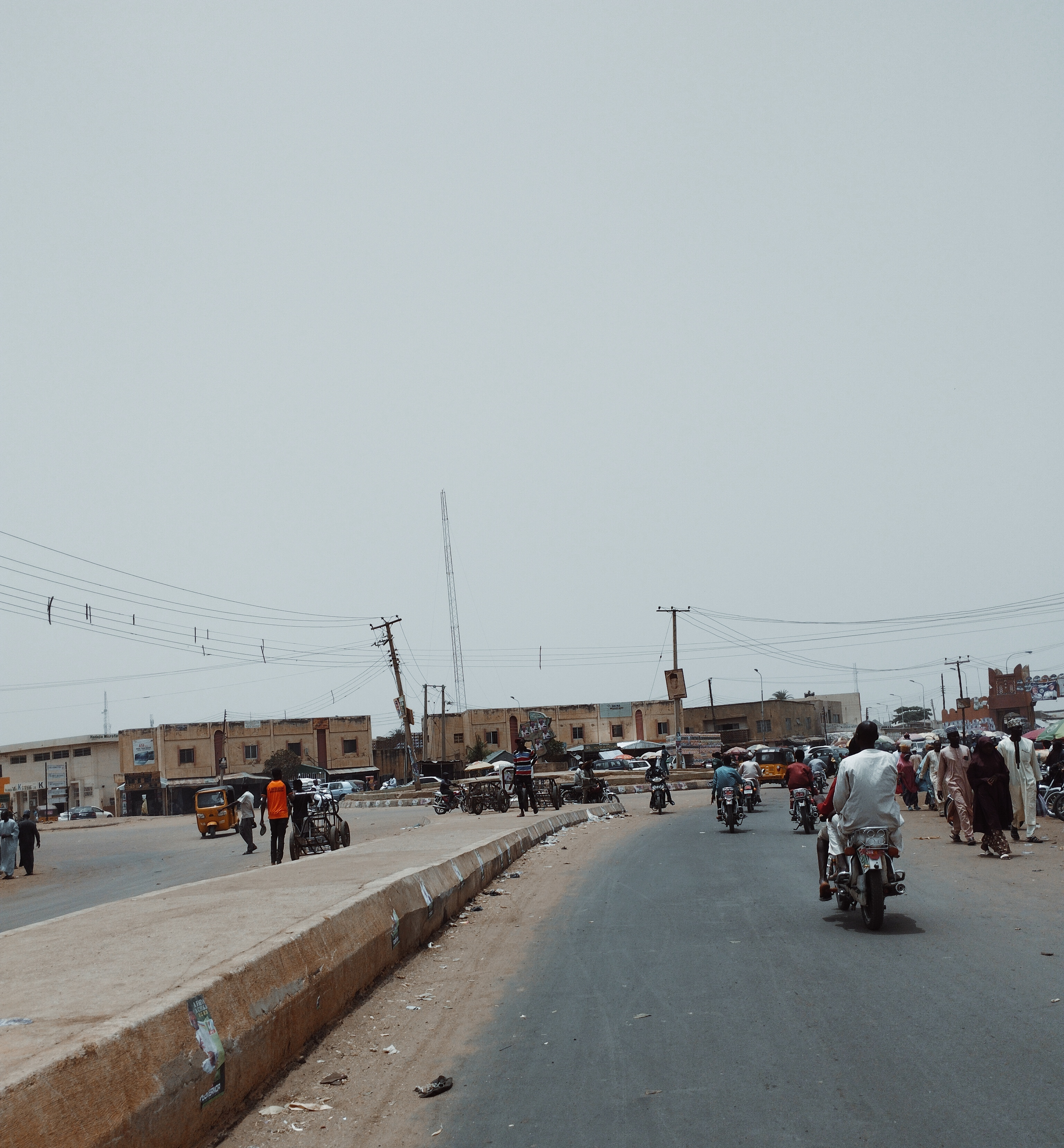
Toward the entrance to the Hadejia Market

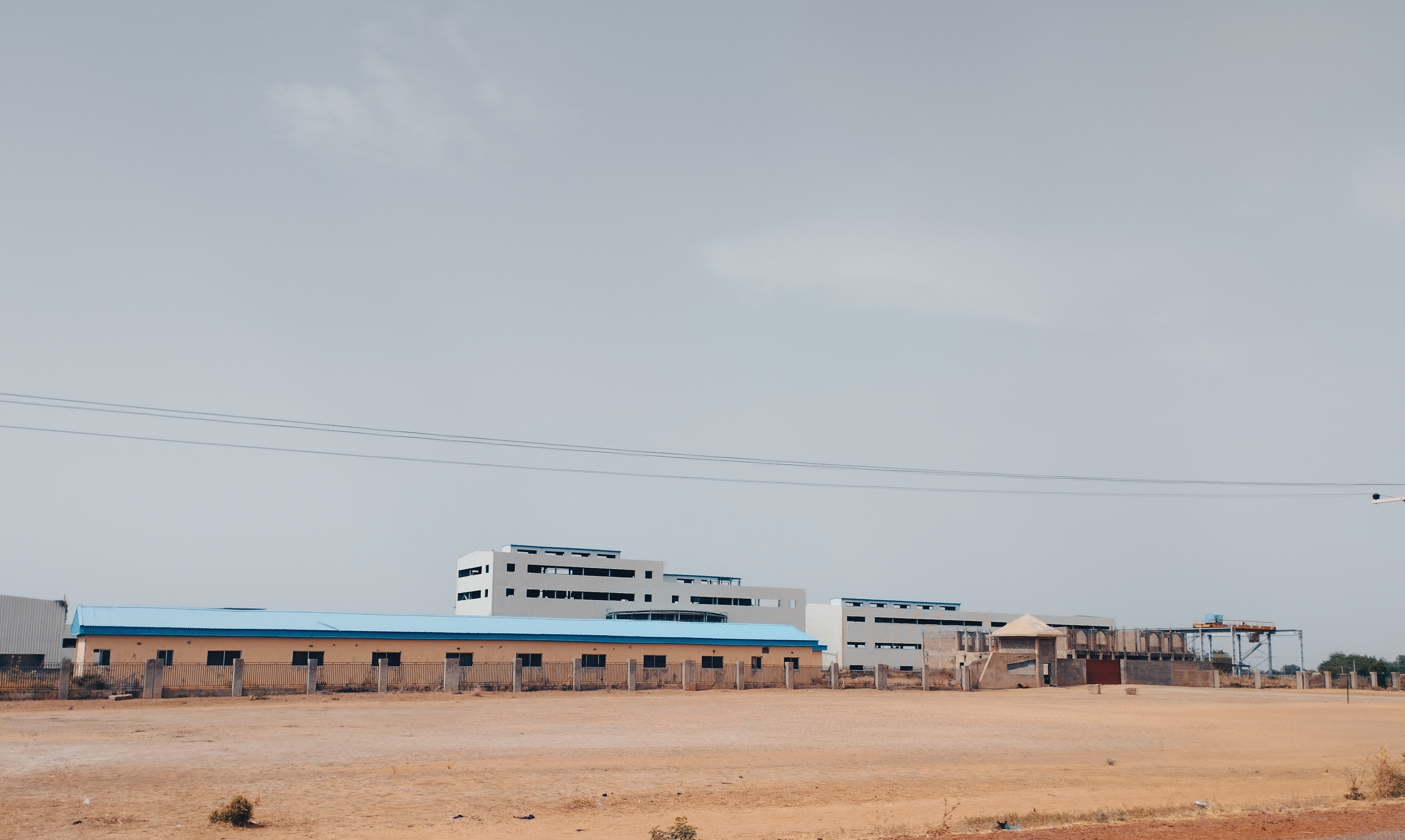
Abandoned Sugar refinery company in Hadejia

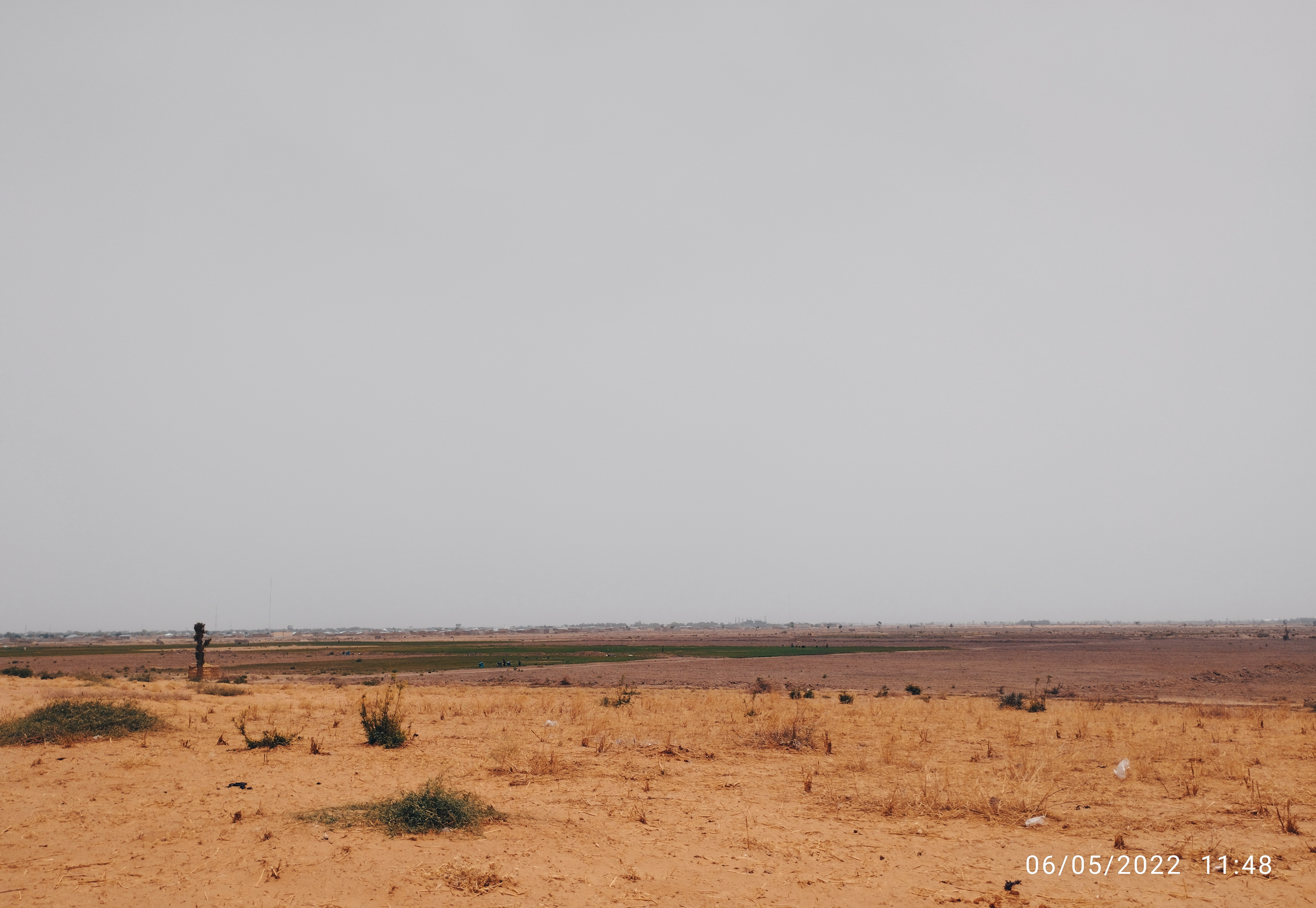
Farmland in eastern Hadejia

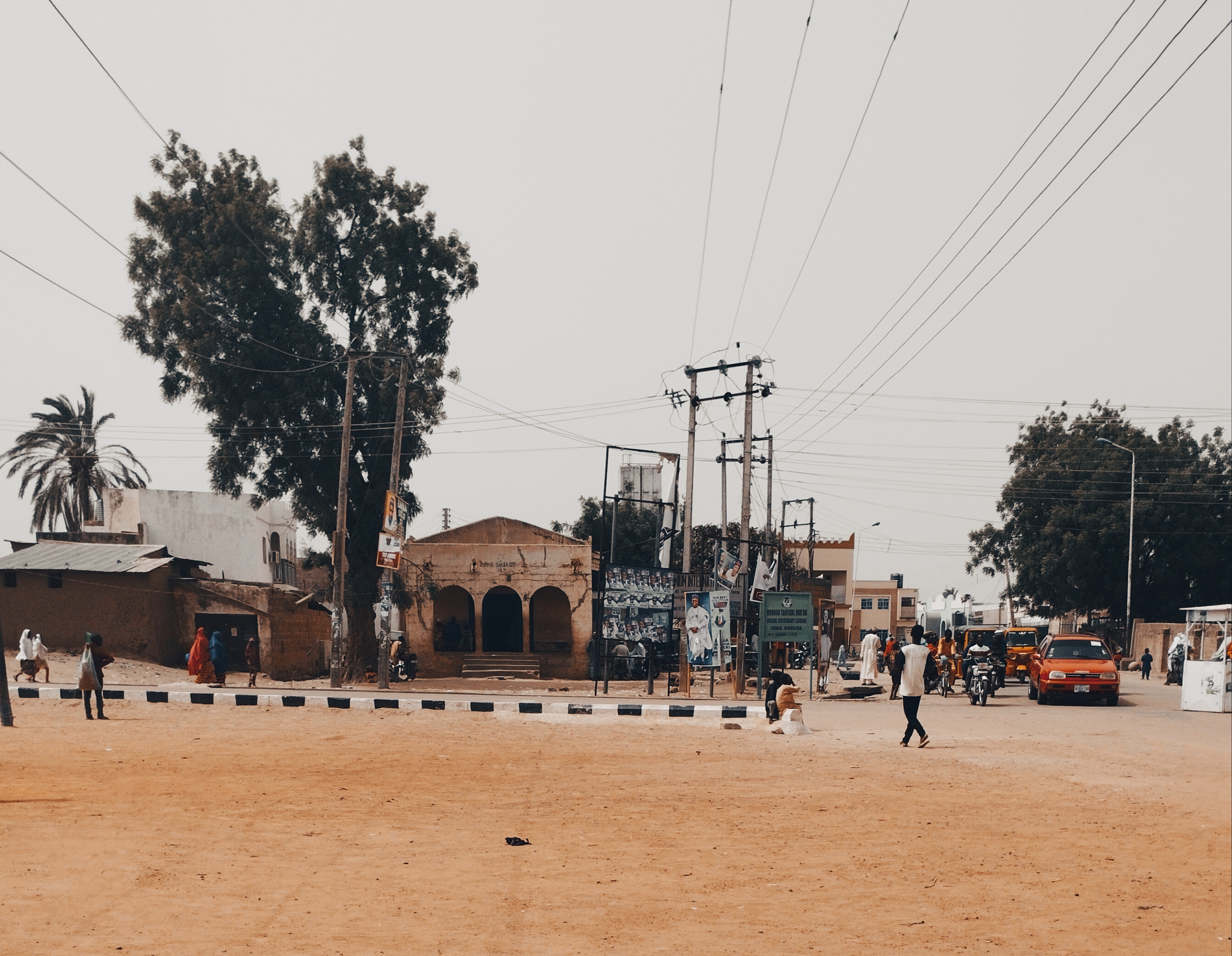
Downtown Hadejia

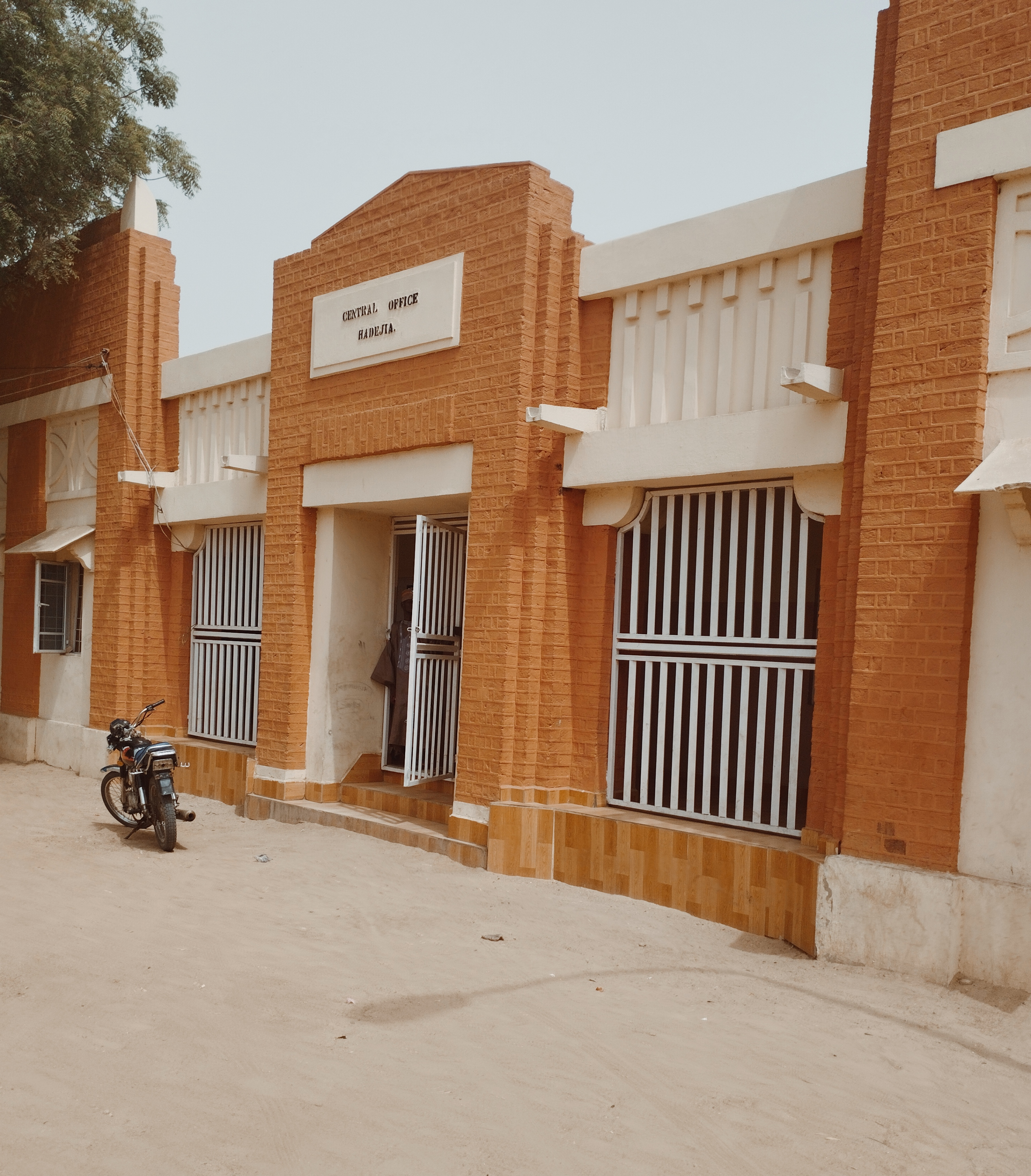
The Central Office, Hadejia

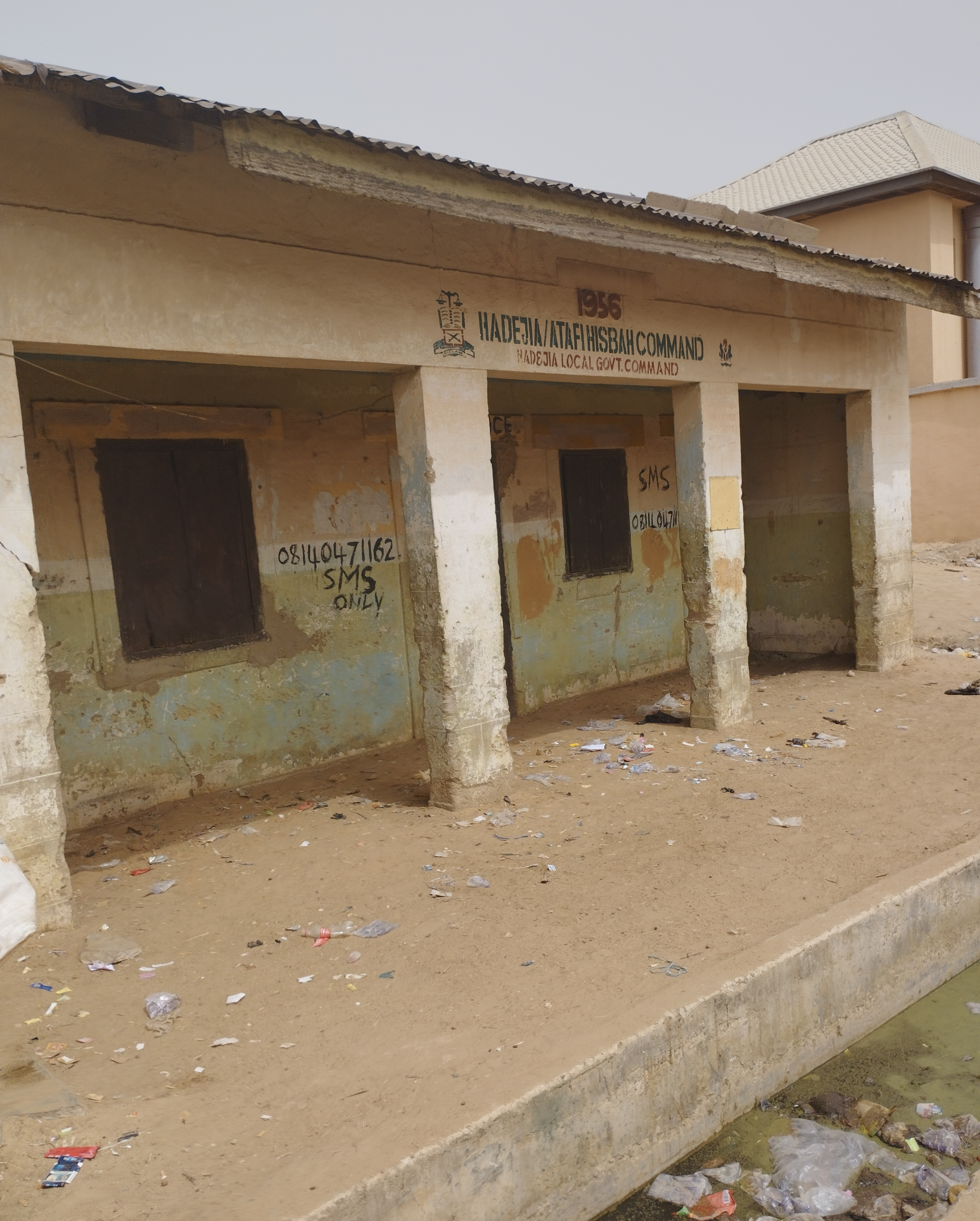
Hisbah Office

=== GLAM and educational institutes ===
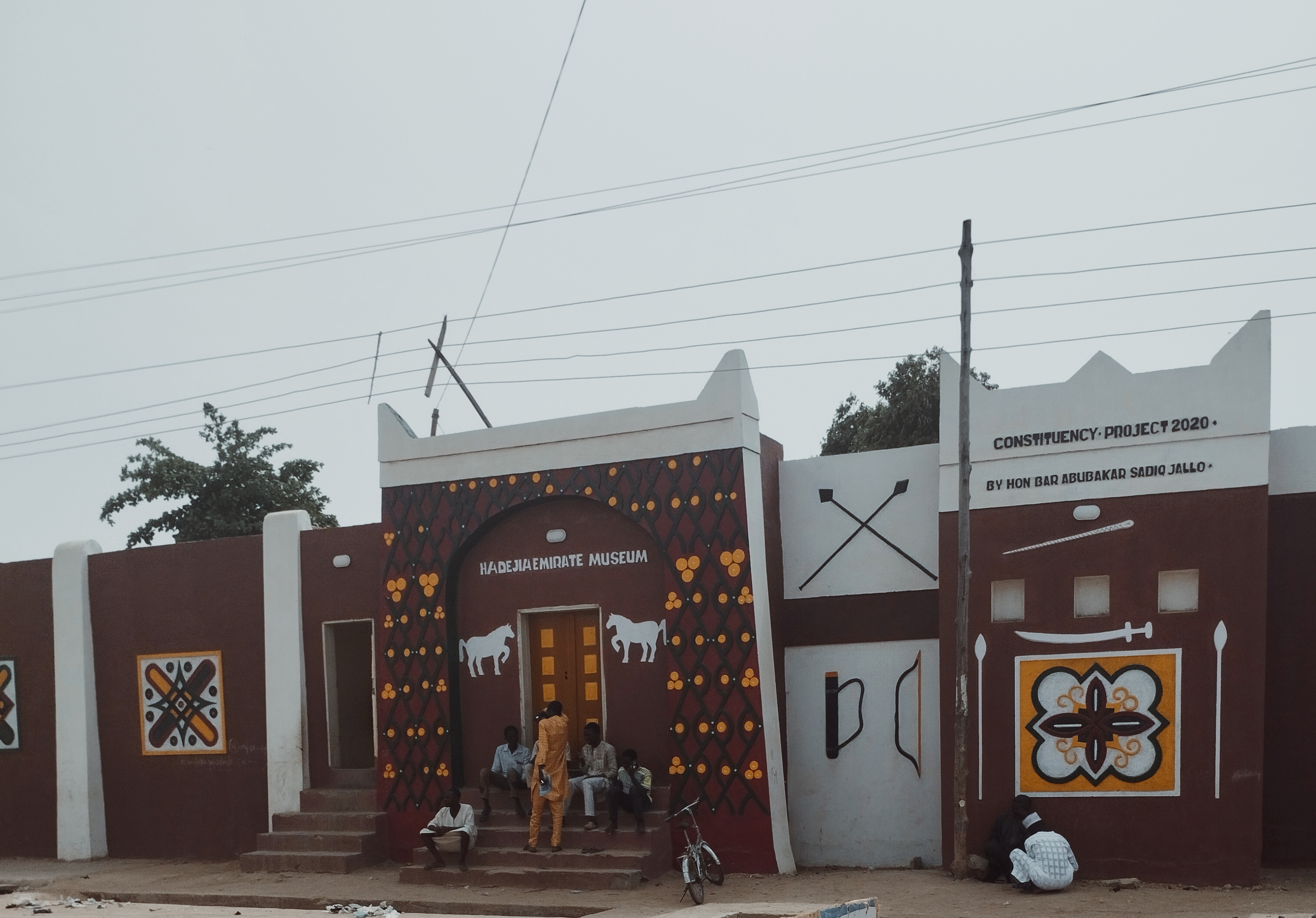
Hadejia Museum

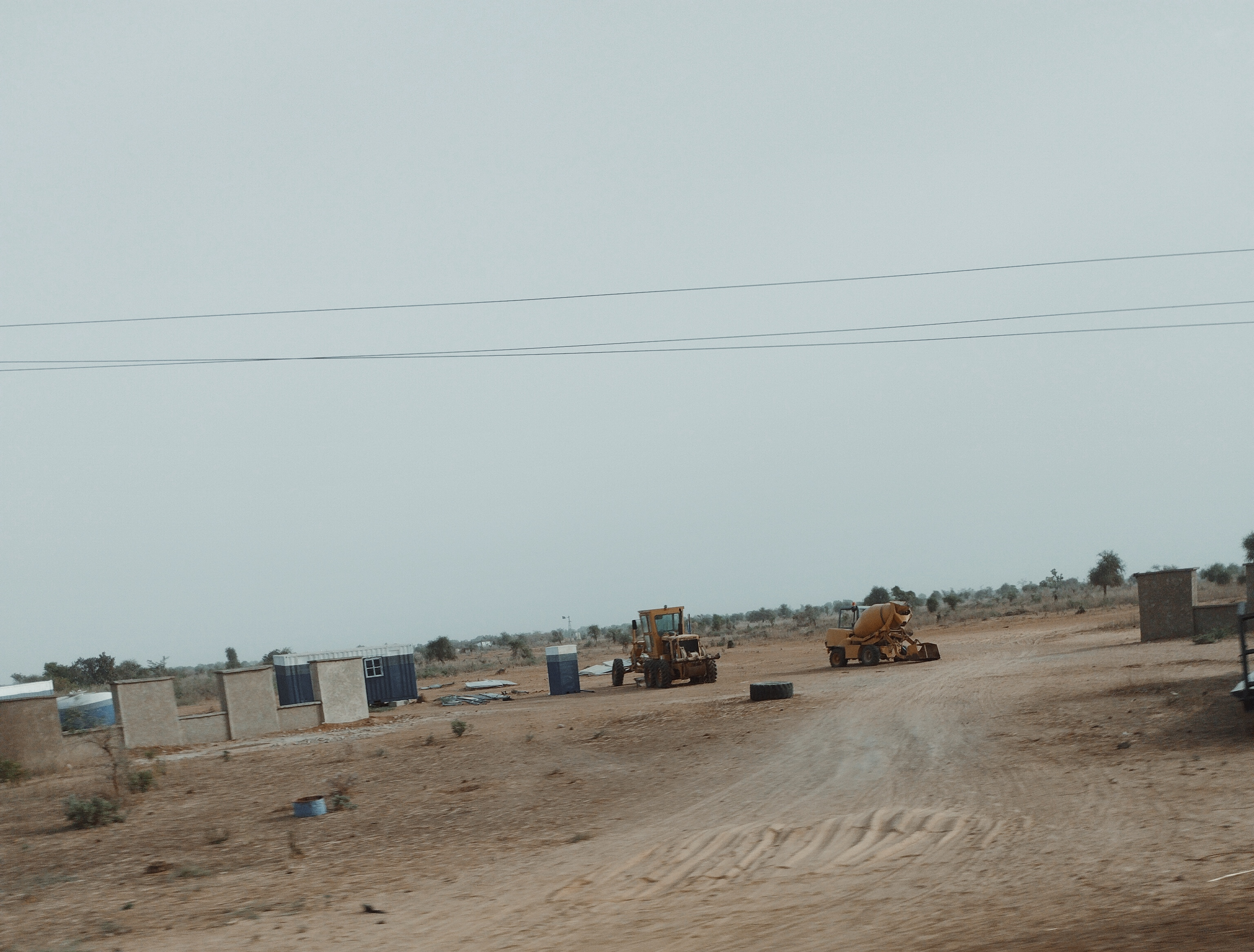
IZALA University, under construction

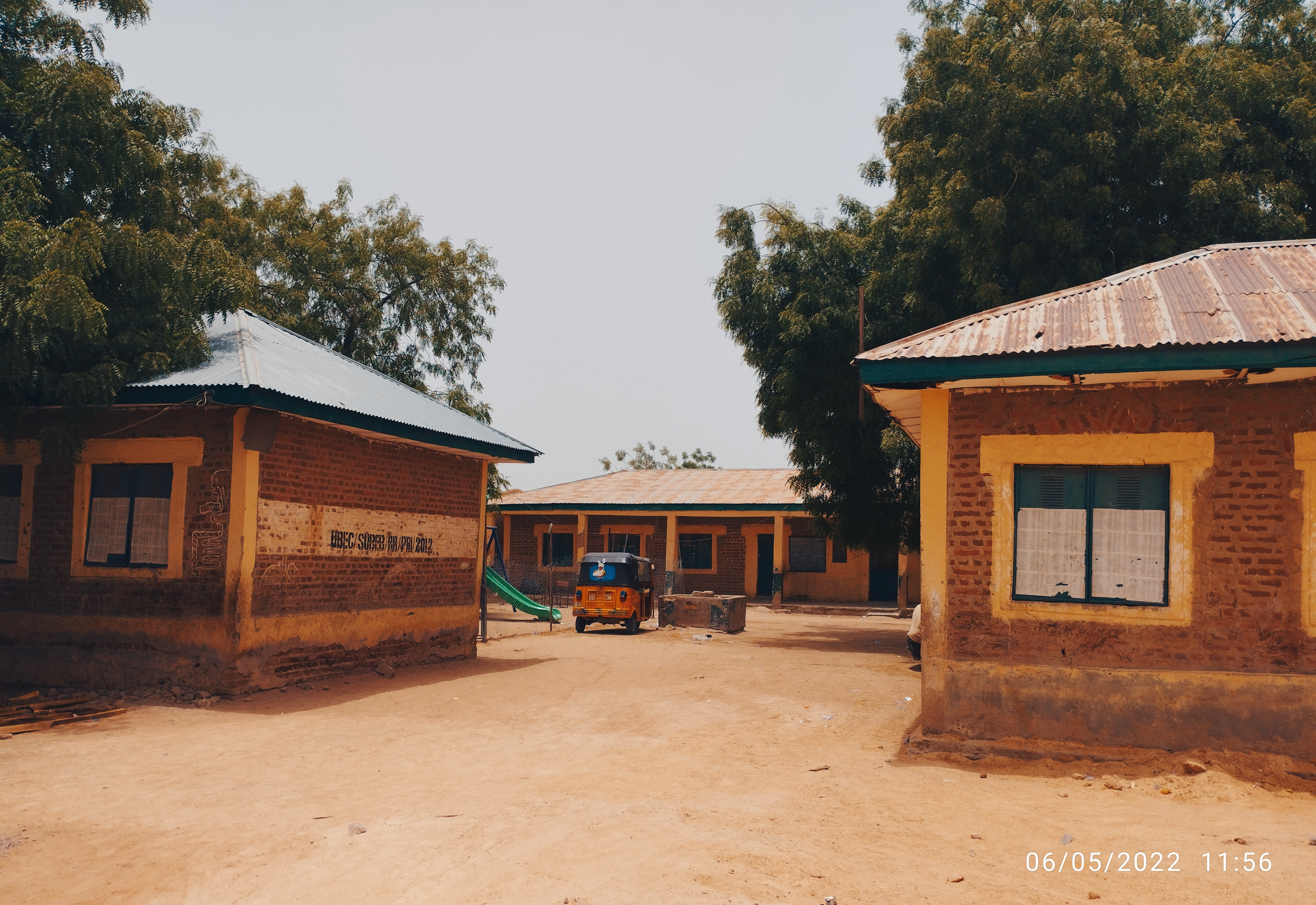
The old primary school

=== Culture ===
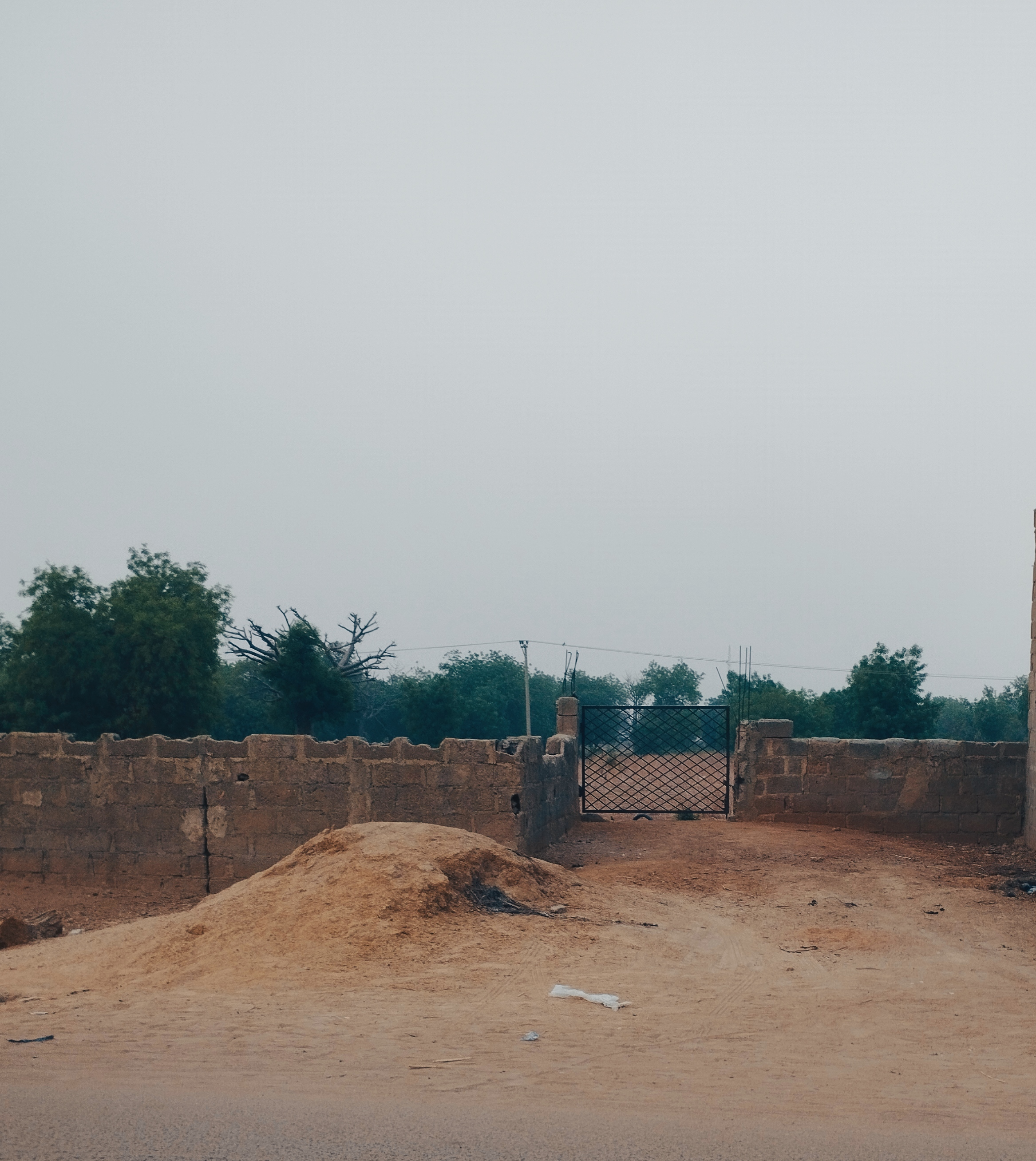
Hadejia Cemetery

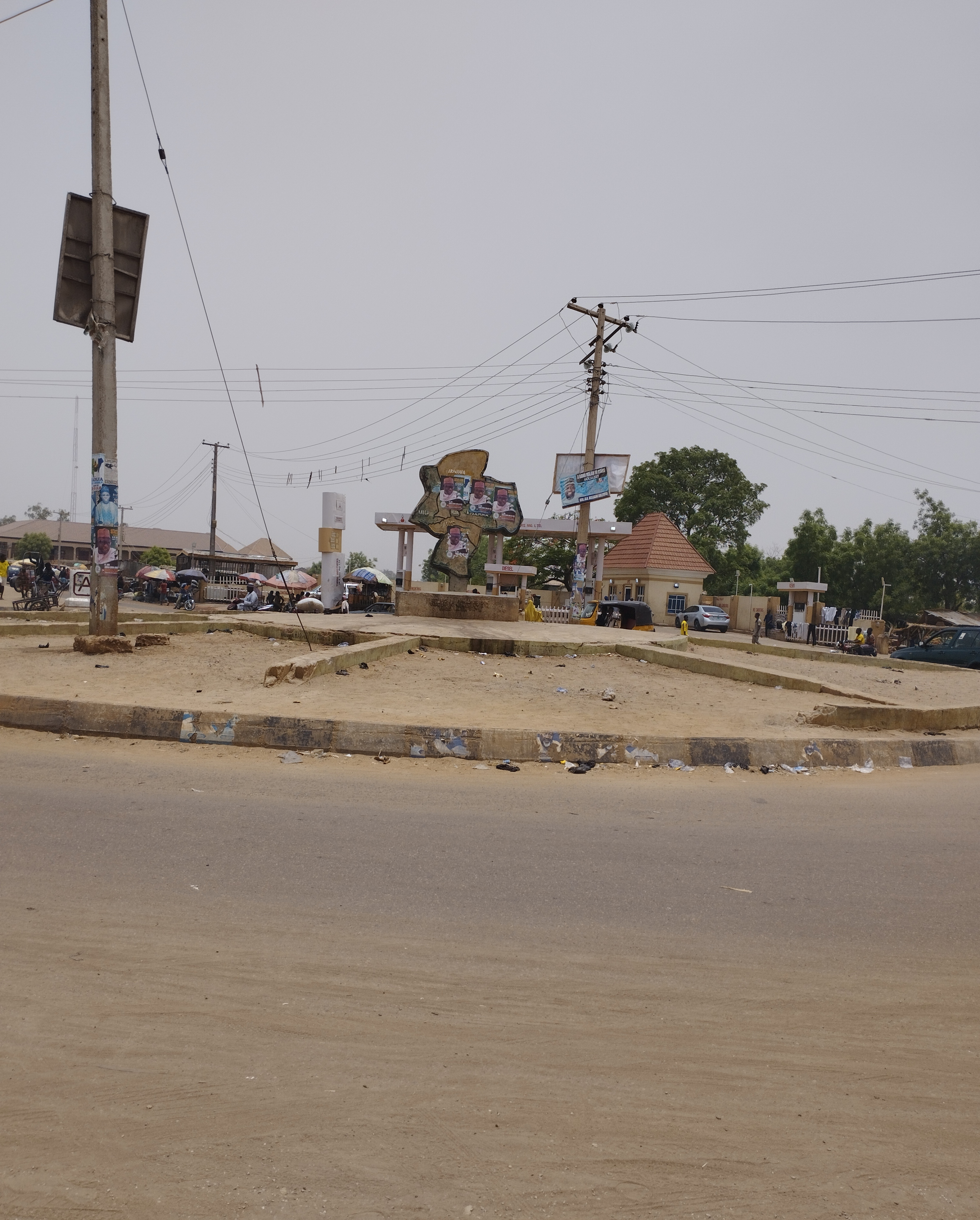
A roundabout in central Hadejia, past Gate Western

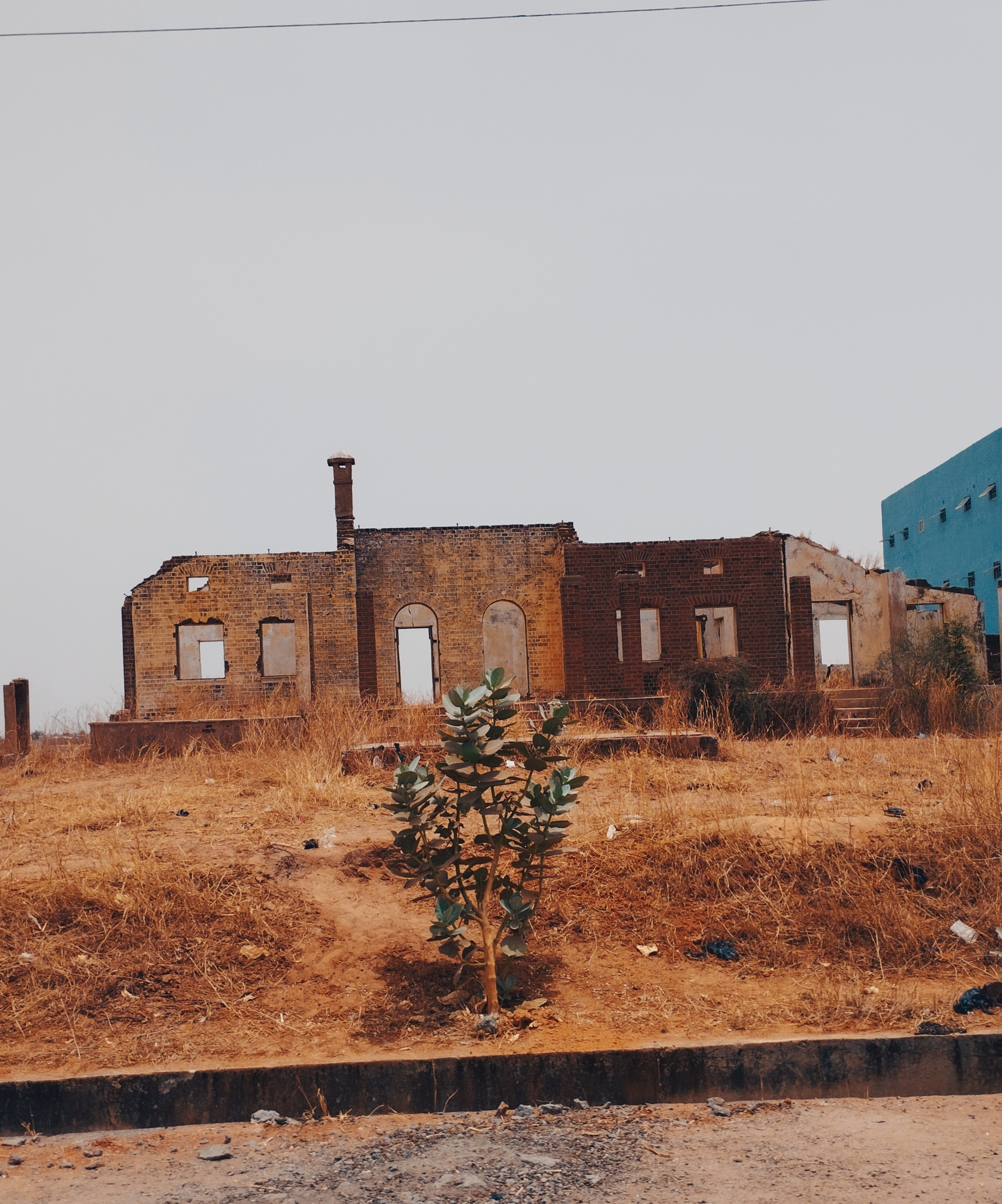
A colonial residence near Hadejia city

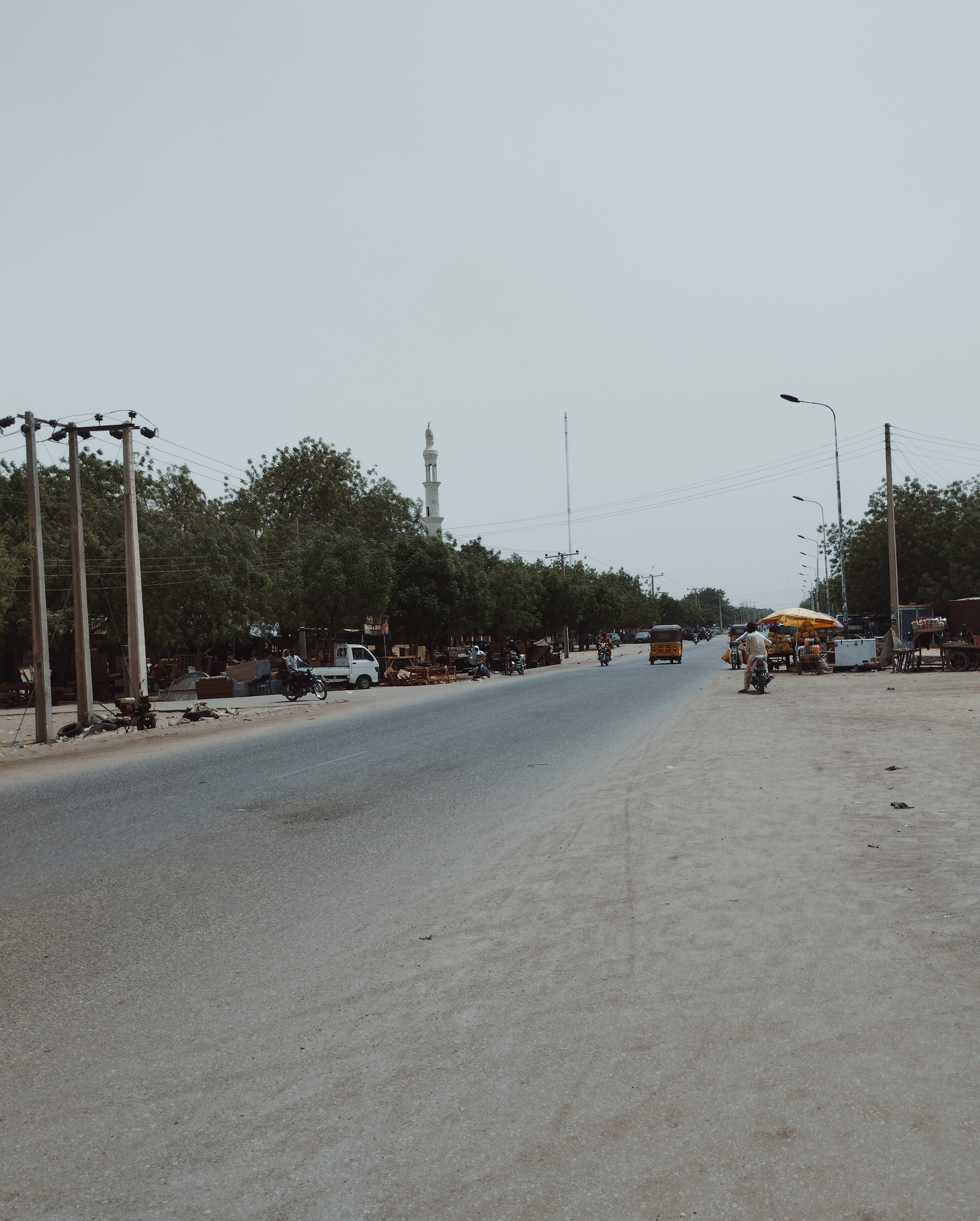
Nguru Road toward NATO Motor Park

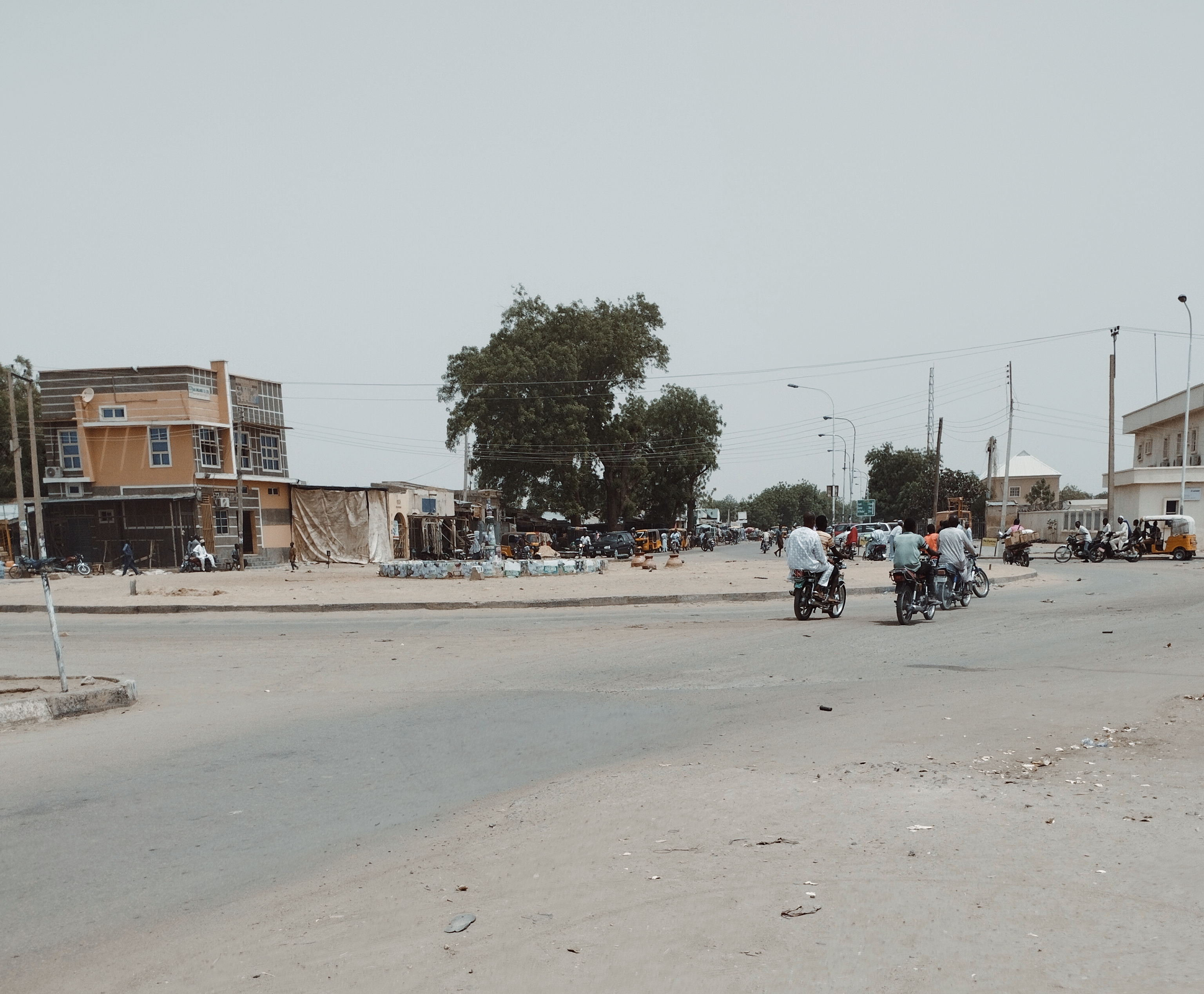
A roundabout at Gumel-Madana-Malam Maduri-Hadejia

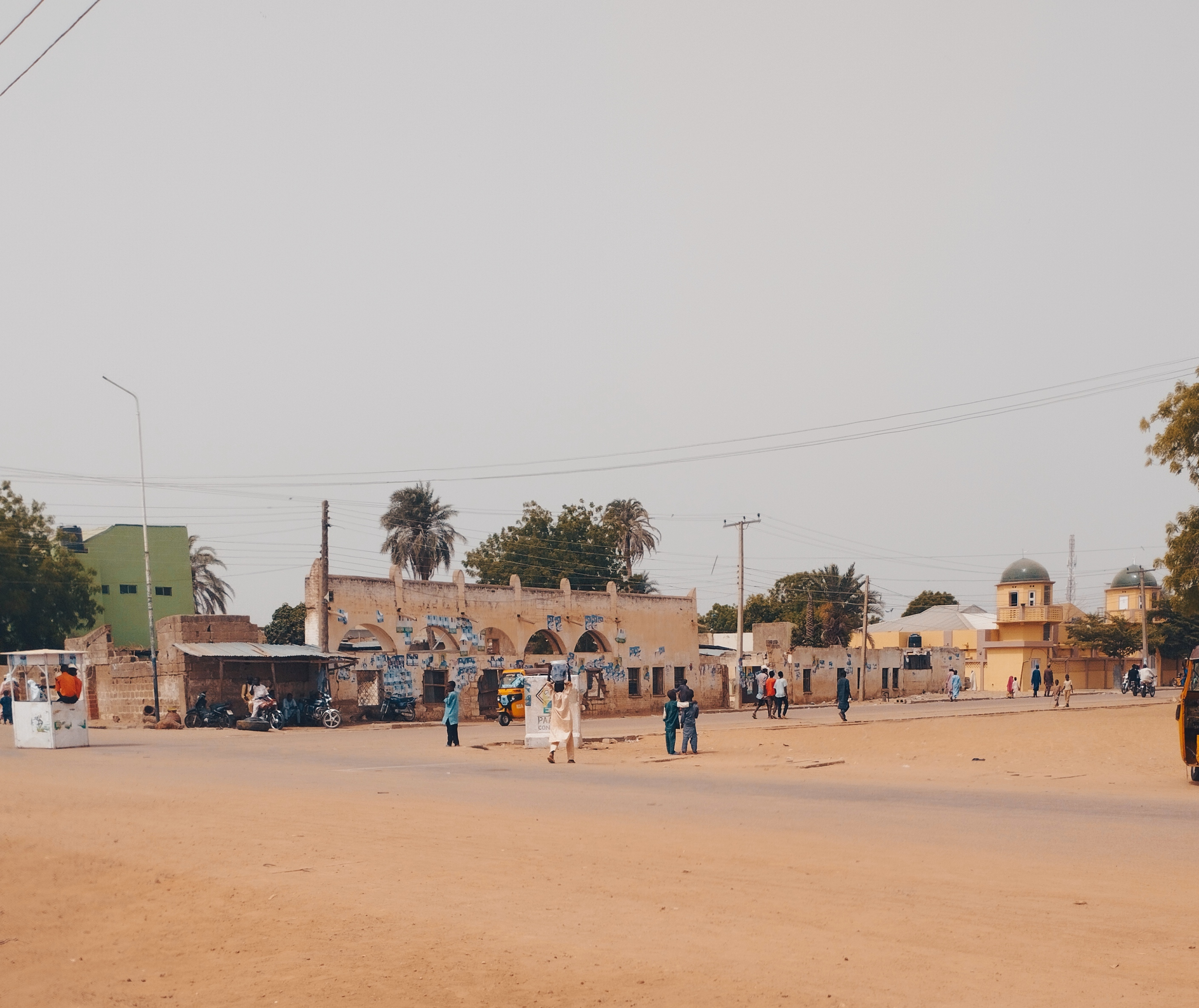
Outside Koga Market Mosque, Hadejia

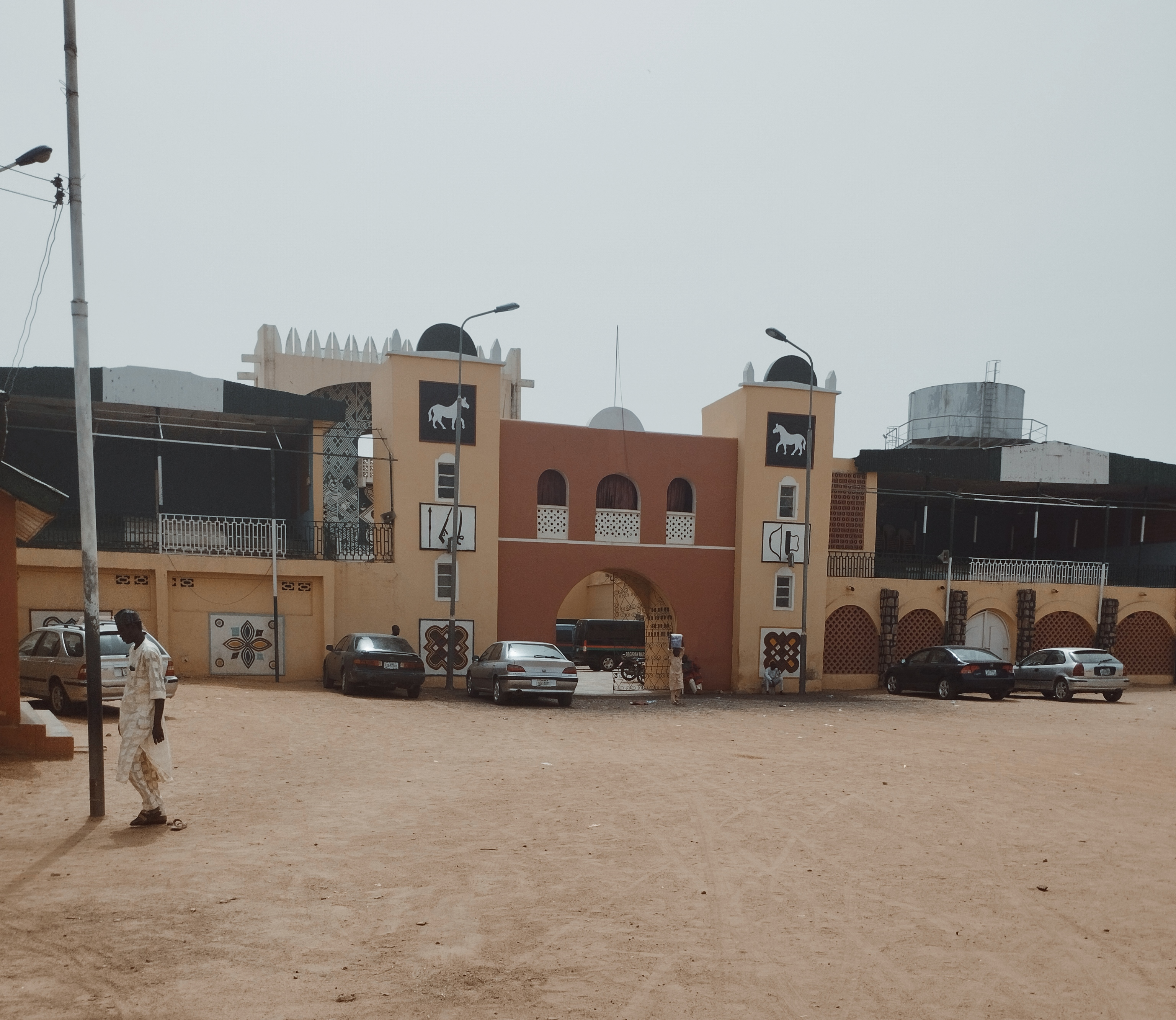
Emir's Palace Hadejia

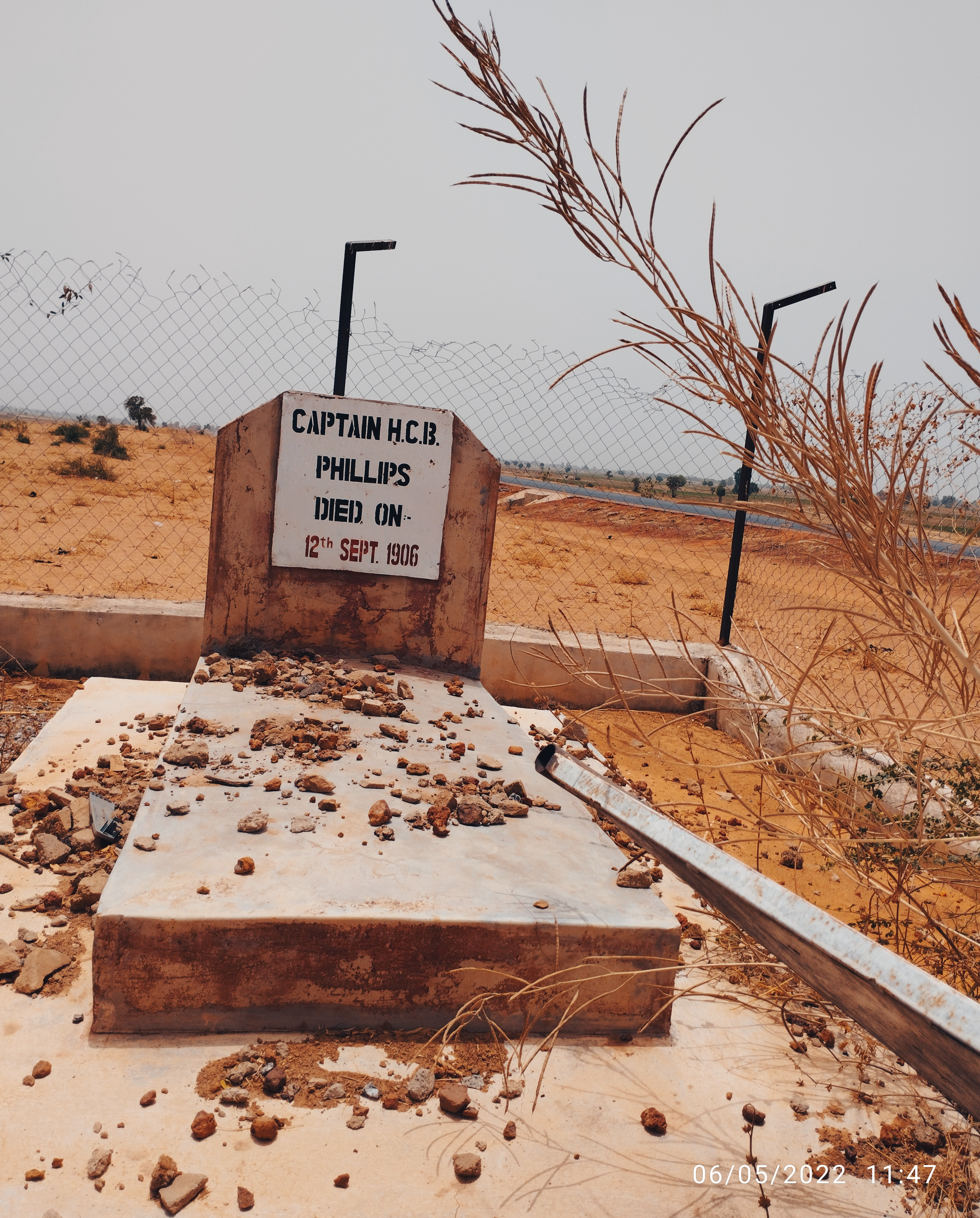
Grave of Captain Phillips (kabarin mai tumbi)
