= 2011 Nigerian Senate elections in Abia State =

2011 Nigerian Senate election in Abia State

The 2011 Nigerian Senate election in Abia State was held on April 9, 2011, to elect members of the Nigerian Senate to represent Abia State. Nwaogu Nkechi Justina representing Abia Central, Enyinnaya Abaribe representing Abia South and CHukwumerije Uche representing Abia North all won on the platform of People's Democratic Party (Nigeria).

== Overview ==
Affiliation	Party			Total
Affiliation	APC	PDP	PRP	Total
Before Election	0	2	1	3
After Election	0	3	0	3

== Summary ==
District	Incumbent	Party	Elected Senator	Party
Abia Central	Nkechi Nwaogu Justina	PDP	Nwaogu Nkechi Justina	PDP
Abia South	Eyinnaya Abaribe	PDP	Enyinnaya Abaribe	PDP
Abia North	Uche Chukwumerije	PRP	Chukwumerije Uche	PDP

== Results ==
=== Abia Central ===
People's Democratic Party (Nigeria) candidate Nwaogu Nkechi Justina won the election, defeating All Progressives Grand Alliance candidate Anamah Uzomah Kingsley and other party candidates.

2011 Nigerian Senate election in Abia State
Party	Candidate	Votes	%
PDP	Nwaogu Nkechi Justina		
APGA	Anamah Uzomah Kingsley		
Total votes			
PDP hold			

=== Abia South ===
People's Democratic Party (Nigeria) candidate Enyinnaya Abaribe won the election, defeating All Progressives Grand Alliance candidate Anyim Chinyere Nyere and other party candidates.

2011 Nigerian Senate election in Abia State
Party	Candidate	Votes	%
PDP	Eyinnaya Abaribe		
APC	Anyim Chinyere Nyere		
Total votes			
PDP hold			

=== Abia River North ===
People's Democratic Party (Nigeria) candidate Chukwumerije Uche won the election, defeating All Progressives Grand Alliance candidate Nnennaya Lancaster-Okoro and other party candidates.

2011 Nigerian Senate election in Abia State
Party	Candidate	Votes	%
PDP	Chukwumerije Uche		
APC	Nnennaya Lancaster-Okoro		
Total votes			
PDP hold			
