= 2007 Nigerian Senate elections in Abia State =

The 2007 Nigerian Senate election in Abia State was held on 21 April 2007, to elect members of the Nigerian Senate to represent Abia State. Nkechi J Nwaogu representing Abia Central and Eyinnaya Abaribe representing Abia South won on the platform of People's Democratic Party while Uche Chukwumerije representing Abia North won on the platform of the Progressive Peoples Alliance.

== Overview ==
| Affiliation | Party | | | Total |
| Affiliation | PDP | PPA | ANPP | Total |
| Before Election | 2 | 0 | 1 | 3 |
| After Election | 2 | 1 | 0 | 3 |

== Summary ==
| District | Incumbent | Party | Elected Senator | Party |
|---|---|---|---|---|
| Abia Central | Bob Nwannunu | PDP | Nkechi Nwaogu | PDP |
| Abia South | Adolphus Wabara | PDP | Eyinnaya Abaribe | PDP |
| Abia North | Ike Nwachukwu | PDP | Uche Chukwumerije | PPA |

== Results ==
=== Abia Central ===
The election was won by Nkechi Nwaogu of the Peoples Democratic Party (Nigeria).

2007 Nigerian Senate election in Abia State
| Party | Candidate | Votes | % |
|---|---|---|---|
| PDP | Nkechi Nwaogu | | |
| Total votes | | | |
| PDP hold | | | |

=== Abia South ===
The election was won by Eyinnaya Abaribe of the Peoples Democratic Party (Nigeria).

2007 Nigerian Senate election in Abia State
| Party | Candidate | Votes | % |
|---|---|---|---|
| PDP | Nkechi Nwaogu | | |
| Total votes | | | |
| PDP hold | | | |

=== Abia Central ===
The election was won by Uche Chukwumerije of the Progressive Peoples Alliance.

2007 Nigerian Senate election in Abia State
| Party | Candidate | Votes | % |
|---|---|---|---|
| PDP | Uche Chukwumerije | | |
| Total votes | | | |
| PPA hold | | | |
