= Chukwumerije =

- Gender: Male
- Language: Igbo

Origin
- Word/name: Igboland
- Meaning: God makes something walk.

Chukwumerije audio is a surname of Igbo origin.

Notable people with the surname include:

- Chika Chukwumerije (born 1983), Nigerian taekwondo artist
- Dike Chukwumerije, Nigerian poet and author
- Uche Chukwumerije (1939–2015), Nigerian politician
