= Aniebiet Inyang Ntui =

Nigerian academic

Professor Aniebiet Inyang Ntui
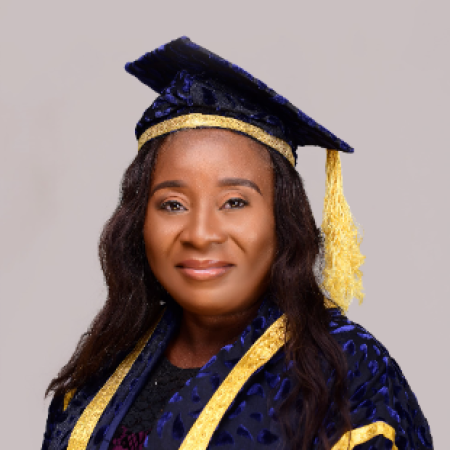
- Official portrait, 2022

University Librarian, University of Calabar
- Incumbent
- Assumed office 24 February 2022
- President: Florence Banku Obi; Vice-Chancellor

Personal details
- Education: University of Cross River State, Uyo (B.S.); University of Ibadan, Nigeria (MLAIS); University of Calabar, Nigeria (MEd); University of Uyo (PhD)
- Known for: Climate and Biodiversity Advocacy, Literacy Advocacy, and Library Development

Aniebiet Inyang Ntui is a Nigerian diplomat, special advisor, environmentalist and Professor of Library and Information Science who has served as the Ambassador of the European Climate Pact since 2022 and the University Librarian of the University of Calabar. She was named as the "Most Read Researcher in Nigeria" in August 2022.

She has virtually chaired panels and negotiations at the 2023 United Nations Climate Change Conference, the 2022 United Nations Biodiversity Conference, the 2023 G20 New Delhi summit, the 2022 G20 Bali Summit, the 2022 United Nations Climate Change Conference, the United Nations Summit on Groundwater, and the 2023 World Economic Forum and various other high-level events.

== Education ==
Aniebiet holds a Bachelor's Degree from the University of Uyo, a Diploma in Computer Techniques and Applications from the University of Ibadan, and a Master's Degree in Education from the University of Calabar.

She also holds a Master's Degree in Library, Archival and Information Science from the University of Ibadan and a Ph.D. in Library and Information Science from the University of Uyo.

== Career ==
Aniebiet Inyang Ntui is a Professor at the University of Calabar, where she has been a Key Member of the University's Management. She has over two decades of experience in program management, financial management, fundraising, international relations and development.

During her career, she has made significant contributions to research and has been recognized for her work. In February 2022, she was appointed as the Chief Executive of the University of Calabar Library and became the 5th Substantive University Librarian by the 13th Governing Council of the institution headed by General Martin Luther Agwai.

In August 2022, she was named as the Most Read Researcher in Nigeria by the Web of Science, with over 500,000 reads on the ResearchGate Platform. In addition, she received the Leaders in Law's 2022 UK Global Prize as "the Education Services Expert of the Year in Nigeria."

Professor Ntui is actively involved in various global health, environmental science, and international research initiatives. She is a member of the C7's Global Health Working Group, including the Gender & Health Sub-Working Group, as well as the C7's Climate and Environmental Justice Working Group and P20's Climate and Environment Policy Working Group. She is a Stakeholder Member of the Polifonia Project. Additionally, she serves as an Overseas Associate Member of the University of the West of Scotland's Centre for African Research on Enterprise and Economic Development and the University of Glasgow's UK-COP 26 Universities Climate Network.

She contributed her expertise to the Nigeria Centre for Disease Control's Contact Tracing Program during the COVID-19 pandemic in 2020–2021 and participated in the Johns Hopkins University's COVID-19 Contact Tracing Initiative in 2020. She also made significant contributions to the Nigerian Guinea Worm Eradication Programme from 1993 to 1998 and was involved in the Ford Foundation's Initiative for the Visually Handicapped in 1997.

As a member of the Civil 7 Engagement Group, Aniebiet Ntui provided "valuable recommendations" to the 2023 Japanese Presidency of the G7. Her recommendations emphasized the need for sustainable practices, equitable distribution of resources, and the prioritization of global health initiatives. Professor Ntui's advocacy as a Member of the UN CBD Women's Caucus led to a historic moment during the 2022 United Nations Biodiversity Conference. For the first time in its 30-year history, a Rio Convention adopted a stand-alone target on gender equality in the Kunming-Montreal Global Biodiversity Framework.

Prof. Ntui has made substantial contributions to the understanding of environmental pollution, particularly through her research on noise pollution in Nigerian universities. Her studies, published in the Journal of Nigerian Environmental Society (2004) and the African Journal of Library, Archives, and Information Science (2009), have been widely cited and serve as a key reference point for Nigerian researchers in this field.

In June 2023, Professor Aniebiet had a high-level meeting with President Volodymyr Zelenskyy of Ukraine to discuss the environmental impact of the Destruction of the Kakhovka Dam, part of the Russian invasion of Ukraine, They were joined by a group of approximately 60 prominent individuals, including political figures and public representatives such as Vice-President of the European Parliament Heidi Hautala, environmental activist Greta Thunberg, and former Deputy Prime Minister and Foreign Minister of Sweden Margot Wallström.

== Controversy ==
In October, an article emerged which claimed that Professor Aniebiet was "set" to endorse the Presidential Candidate of the Nigerian Labor Party, Peter Obi ahead of the 2023 Nigerian Elections. Other articles went further to claim that Aniebiet will be the Minister of Education in the "Obi-Datti administration". Later that week, Professor Aniebiet through a statement released in the City of Calabar said she has no plans to endorse any political party or candidate ahead of the 2023 general elections, she also noted that she has no interest in "any divisive issues or any political appointments" from the Labor Party. Her statement ignited a strong response from supporters of the Youth 'Obidient' movement who took to various social media platforms to criticize her.

== Publications ==
- Noise Sources and Levels at the University of Calabar Library. African Journal of Library, Archives and Information Science.
- Library Services Delivery in Africa during and after COVID-19 Pandemic: Call to Action & Guide for African Libraries & Librarians. Library Aid Africa.
- Motivation as Correlates of Work Attitude of Library Staff in Tertiary Institutions' Libraries in Cross River State, Nigeria. Journal of Library and Information Science.
- Gender Disparity in Science, Technology & Mathematics in Nigeria. The Paragon, A Journal of the National Association of Women Academics.
- Mobile Phone Etiquette in Nigeria: The Case of Calabar Municipality, Nigeria. IRMA.
- Economic Challenges and Prospects Associated with the Utilization of Information and Communication Technology (ICT) for Library Services in Universities in Cross River State, Nigeria. EBSCO Information Services.
- Developing Strategies for Effective Knowledge Management (KM) in University Libraries in Nigeria. ResearchGate
- Role of Library in Conflict and Peace Process in Bakassi Area of Nigeria. Bepress.

== See also ==
- Frans Timmermans
- Nnimmo Bassey
- Tunji Bello
- Jessica Gardner
- Victoria Okojie
- Peter Gregory Obi
- Lenrie Olatokunbo Aina
- Andrea Joana-Maria Wiktorin
- Małgorzata Wasilewska
