= Agbor (name) =

Agbor is both a given name and a surname. Notable people with the name include:

- Agbor Gilbert Ebot (born 1983), Cameroonian film producer
- Brian Agbor (born 2001), Cameroonian footballer
- Queeneth Agbor (fl. 2014), Nigerian actress
- Felix Agbor Balla (born 1970), Cameroonian human rights lawyer
