= 2003 Nigerian Senate elections in Abia State =

2003 Nigerian Senate election in Abia State

The 2003 Nigerian Senate election in Abia State was held on April 12, 2003, to elect members of the Nigerian Senate to represent Abia State. Uche Chukwumerije representing Abia North, Chris Adighije represented Abia Central and Adolphus Wabara represented Abia South and they all won the Peoples Democratic Party platform.

== Overview ==
| Affiliation | Party | | Total |
| Affiliation | PDP | AD | Total |
|---|---|---|---|
| Before Election | | | 3 |
| After Election | 3 | 0 | 3 |

== Summary ==
| District | Incumbent | Party | Elected Senator | Party |
|---|---|---|---|---|
| Abia North | | | Uche Chukwumerije | PDP |
| Abia Central | | | Chris Adighije | PDP |
| Abia South | | | Adolphus Wabara | PDP |

== Results ==
=== Abia North ===
The election was won by Uche Chukwumerije of the Peoples Democratic Party.

2003 Nigerian Senate election in Abia State
| Party | Candidate | Votes | % |
|---|---|---|---|
| PDP | Uche Chukwumerije | | |
| Total votes | | | |
| PDP hold | | | |

=== Abia Central ===
The election was won by Chris Adighije of the Peoples Democratic Party.

2003 Nigerian Senate election in Abia State
| Party | Candidate | Votes | % |
|---|---|---|---|
| PDP | Chris Adighije | | |
| Total votes | | | |
| PDP hold | | | |

=== Abia South ===
The election was won by Adolphus Wabara of the Peoples Democratic Party.

2003 Nigerian Senate election in Abia State
| Party | Candidate | Votes | % |
|---|---|---|---|
| PDP | Adolphus Wabara | | |
| Total votes | | | |
| PDP hold | | | |
