= Josephine Effah-Chukwuma =

Nigerian social entrepreneur

- Born: Josephine Effah; Lagos state, Nigeria
- Education: University of Calabar; Institute of Social Studies, Hague, Netherlands
- Occupations: Social entrepreneur; Human right advocate
- Known for: Founder and Executive Director, Project Alert

Josephine Effah-Chukwuma (born 29 September 1966) is a Nigerian development specialist and advocate against domestic violence who founded Sophia's Place, the first battered women's shelter in Nigeria She is the founder and executive director of Project Alert established in January, 1999 which provides medical assistance to injured female victims through public fund sourcing and also provide legal services to victims.

== Background and education ==
Effah-Chukwuma is an English and Literature graduate from the University of Calabar with a master's degree in Development Studies with Specialization in women from the Institute of Social Studies in The Hague, Netherlands. She was married to fellow social entrepreneur and human rights activist Innocent Chukwuma until his death in 2021

== Career ==
She worked for a newspaper called The Diplomat until 1992 when she went for her master's degree after which she joined The Constitutional Rights Project, an institution founded by Clement Nwankwo.

She has saved a lot of women through her NGO Project Alert. In May 2001, she launched a shelter project known as Sophia's place (the first battered women's shelter in Nigeria) – a temporary shelter for victims of domestic violence. For eight years, the shelter operated in a rented building.

In 2010, Project Alert was able to acquire its own building for its shelter project through funds raised at the Ngo's 10th Anniversary Shelter Fundraising event in 2009 and funds received from the African Women Foundation, AWDF, Accra Ghana.

She is a member of several organizations which include Lead Consultant at Justice for all (J4A) Programme 1.4 Voluntary Policing, President at Our Lady of Apostle Old Students Association, Founding Member at Association on Research in Civil Society in Africa, AROCSA and also an Ashoka fellow since 2002.
