= Akeju =

- Gender: Male
- Language: Yoruba

Origin
- Origin: Nigerian
- Region of origin: South-West Nigeria

Akeju is a surname. Notable people with the name include:

- Akeju (singer) Nigerian singer, songwriter, and producer
- Camille Akeju, American curator and educator
