= John Elliott (architect) =

British architect (1936–2010)

John Elliott, RIBA, (26 October 1936 – 13 September 2010) was a British architect, who planned and designed luxury hotels and resorts. Born in Portsmouth, England, he was known principally for his contribution in the Middle East and designing 7 star hotel Emirates Palace in Abu Dhabi, United Arab Emirates.

== Biography ==
=== Education ===
John Elliott (Richard John Anthony Elliott), was born in Portsmouth, England. After leaving home at the age of 15, he travelled around Europe before winning a scholarship at the Architectural Association School of Architecture in London. Upon graduating, he took a short course in product design at the Central School of Art, before winning a prestigious Finnish government scholarship and finishing his post graduate studies at the Institute of Technology in Helsinki, Finland.

=== Early career ===
After Finland he moved to Sweden where he spent three years in the office of Ralph Erskine. His years in Sweden and Finland had a profound influence on his design approach to the practice of architecture, and it was this practical experience that started a lifetime of wide angle focus on design. In 1967, John became the first official town planner of Abu Dhabi, where his specialisation in the Arabian peninsula began. Initially involved with the first developments of Abu Dhabi, John had a close working relationship with Sheikh Zayed bin Sultan Al Nahyan (1918–2004), ruler of Abu Dhabi and President of the United Arab Emirates (1971–2004).

His work later took him to Saudi Arabia designing projects such as the King Abdulaziz University in Jeddah and consulting for the town planning of Jeddah and Riyadh for the royal family.

=== Sultan of Brunei ===
In addition to architecture, John also worked in interior design, as managing partner of Dale Keller & Associates' London Office. Here, he designed a 3 million square meter stately palace, commissioned by the Sultan of Brunei.

=== Hong Kong ===
He moved to Dale Keller & Associate's Hong Kong office, and was involved in several new hotels in China and other parts of the Far East. John stayed in Hong Kong for 13 years and began working with Wimberly Allison Tong & Goo's founder, George J. "Pete" Wimberly.

=== WATG ===
In 1991, John moved back to the UK as founder member and managing director of Wimberly Allison Tong & Goo's (WATG) London office. He became a member of the board of directors and senior vice-president, specialising in Middle East projects.

== Personal life ==
John Elliott had four children, two from his first marriage to Lisbet Frolich, Timo and Maja, and two children from his marriage to Erika Grohmann, Kelsey and Yolande. John and Erika raised Kelsey and Yolande in Hong Kong before moving back to the UK, where they lived in Sandbanks, Dorset. Two years later they moved to their 1930s Art Deco home in London, which John spent several years remodelling.

== Completed projects ==
=== Architecture ===
- Emirates Palace, Abu Dhabi, United Arab Emirates
- One&Only Royal Mirage, Dubai, United Arab Emirates
- Hilton 2000, Ras Al Khaimah, United Arab Emirates
- The World Resort, Dubai, United Arab Emirates
- Virgin safari resort, Masai Mara, Kenya
- Mövenpick Hotels & Resorts Dead Sea Resort & Spa, Jordan
- Jumeirah Beach Residence, Dubai, United Arab Emirates
- Private Palaces, Al Ain, United Arab Emirates
- Shangri-La Hotels and Resorts Resort, Oman, Muscat
- Sheraton Hotels and Resorts Abu Soma, Soma Bay, Egypt
- Mövenpick Hotels & Resorts El Gouna, Egypt
- InterContinental Hotel Amman, Amman, Jordan
- Grand Hyatt Amman, Amman, Jordan
- Aqaba Beach Resort, Aqaba, Jordan
- Marina Village Ayla Oasis Resort, Aqaba, Jordan
- Legoland, Windsor, United Kingdom
- Denia Marriott La Sella Golf Resort & Spa, Denia, Spain
- Hyatt Regency La Manga Golf Resort, Spain
- Hilton International Resort, Mauritius
- St. Gallen, Switzerland
- Military Hospital, Abu Dhabi, United Arab Emirates
- Three National Clinics, Abu Dhabi, United Arab Emirates
- King Abdulaziz University, Jeddah, Kingdom of Saudi Arabia
- University of Calabar, Nigeria
- Vilamoura, Algave, Portugal
- Villa Gardelius, Stockholm, Sweden
- Svapavaara Housing Kiruna HSB Housing, Tibro, Sweden
- HSB Housing, Gyttorp, Sweden
- Birmingham University Arts Tower, Birmingham, United Kingdom
- Coutts & Co Bank, London, United Kingdom
- Villa Complex, St.Tropez, France
- Phillps Petroleum Villa, Abu Dhabi, United Arab Emirates
- Phillips Petroleum Offices, Abu Dhabi, United Arab Emirates

=== Interior design ===
- Claridge's, London, United Kingdom (hotel refurbishment)
- New Istana Palace, Brunei
- Harbour Grand Hotel, North Point, Hong Kong
- City Plaza Shopping Centre, Hong Kong

=== Master planning ===
- Town Plan, Trebo, Sweden
- Town Plan, Gytorp, Sweden
- Town Plan, Svapavaara Kiruna, Sweden
- Redevelopment of Norwich Station, Norwich, United Kingdom
- Town Plan, Abu Dhabi, United Arab Emirates
- Town Plan, Al Ain, United Arab Emirates
- Town Plan, Um Al Qwain, United Arab Emirates
- Shangri La Resort Master Plan, Muscat, Oman
- Aftelqaat Resort Master Plan, Muscat, Oman
- Bahwan Resort Master Plan, Muscat, Oman
- Ayla Oasis Marina Village Urban Plan, Aqaba, Jordan
- Excelsior Hotel, Nanjing, China
- Mandarin Hotel, Guilin, China
- Swiss Hotel, Beijing, China
- Sharm Al Ibli Master Plan, Red Sea, Egypt
- National Elephant Park Master Plan, Muputo, Mozambique
