= Favour Abatang =

Nigerian non-profit executive

- Born: Favour Abatang; April 13, 2000 (age 26); New Karu, Nasarawa State, Nigeria
- Education: University of Calabar
- Occupations: social entrepreneur; women's right advocate
- Awards: The Diana Award, 100 Reputable Women of African Descent

Favour Abatang (born April 13, 2000) is a Nigerian social entrepreneur and women's rights advocate. Her Voice Foundation was created by Abatang during the 2020s.

She was named among the 100 Reputable Women of African Descent by the African Women Network and is a recipient of The Diana Award.

== Early life and education ==
Favour was born in New Karu, Nasarawa State, before living in Obanliku, Cross River State.

She went on to study philosophy at the University of Calabar. She later got a scholarship from the Mastercard Foundation to study Africa and International Development at the University of Edinburgh.

Additional education was completed at Lagos Business School.

== Career ==
Campus Babe Initiative began during the 2020s. It then became Her Voice Foundation.

== Awards and recognitions ==
Abatang was the Diana Award honouree in 2023. That same year, the Girl Child Education Champion Award in South Africa, was presented to her by the Maldives minister of defense, Mariya Didi.

Abatang was part of the 100 Reputable Women of African Descent list during 2025.
