= Biko Agozino =

Nigerian American criminologist

- Born: 27 July 1961 (age 65); Awgu, Enugu State, Nigeria
- Citizenship: US
- Education: University of Calabar (B.Sc); University of Cambridge (M.Phil.); University of Edinburgh (Ph.D.)
- Occupations: Professor of Sociology and Africana Studies
- Writing career
- Language: English
- Genre: Criminology
- Notable works: Black women and the criminal justice system (1997), Counter-Colonial Criminology: A Critique of Imperialist Reason (2003)

Biko Agozino (born 27 July 1961) is a Nigerian criminologist best known for his 1997 book Black Women and the Criminal Justice System.

== Early life and education ==
Agozino was born on 27 July 1961 in Awgu, Enugu State, Nigeria. He attended the University of Calabar where he gained a BSc in Sociology, the University of Cambridge where he gained a Master of Philosophy in Criminology, and the University of Edinburgh where he earned a PhD in Criminology.

== Career ==
Agozino has been editor of the Interdisciplinary Research Series in Ethnic, Gender and Class Relations series of books from Ashgate Publishing. His 1997 Black Women and the Criminal Justice System: Towards the Decolonisation of Victimisation was the first of these. By 2008 over two dozen books had been published in the series.

He was appointed editor-in-chief of the African Journal of Criminology and Justice Studies and a member of the editorial board of Jenda: A Journal of West African Women's Studies and Culture.

Agozino is a founding member of the international governing council of the Lagos-based think tank the Centre for Democracy and Development. In 2007, Agozino was appointed criminology unit coordinator and professor in sociology at the University of the West Indies, St Augustine, Trinidad and Tobago.

== Work ==
Agozino's work explores the past and present impact of colonisation on the way in which racial and ethnic minorities are treated by justice systems worldwide.

His work develops a postcolonial perspective in African criminology. Agozino challenges the criminology discipline to "decolonize" its theories and methods and to undo the harm that has been done.

In his introduction to Gabbidon's 2007 W.E.B. Du Bois on crime and justice, Agozino notes that "excessive punitiveness" in the criminal justice systems of the US, UK, South Africa and Russia has been increasing rather than reducing the problem of crime. He also noted the hypocrisy of British and American leaders in calling Nelson Mandela a terrorist as he was struggling with the terrorist apartheid regime in South Africa.

His work is theoretical in nature, discussing the development of criminology in western countries and their impact on non-western societies, particularly former colonies. It has rejuvenated the colonial perspective on race and crime.

In his 1997 Black women and the criminal justice system Agozino notes the roles of race and ethnicity in negotiation of power within prison, where coloured people are greatly under-represented among prison officers and over-represented among inmates.

== Bibliography ==
- Biko Agozino (1997). Black women and the criminal justice system: towards the decolonisation of victimisation. Ashgate. ISBN 1-85972-643-7.
- Biko Agozino, ed. (2000). Theoretical and methodological issues in migration research: interdisciplinary, intergenerational and international perspectives. Ashgate. ISBN 1-84014-557-9.
- Biko Agozino (2003). Counter-colonial criminology: a critique of imperialist reason. Pluto Press. ISBN 0-7453-1886-X.
- Anita Kalunta-Crumpton, Biko Agozino (2004). Pan-African issues in crime and justice. Ashgate Publishing, Ltd. ISBN 0-7546-1882-X.
- Biko Agozino (2005). "Nigerian Women in Prison – Hostages in Law". In Julia Sudbury (ed.). Global lockdown: race, gender, and the prison-industrial complex. Routledge. ISBN 0-415-95056-2.
- Biko Agozino (2006). ADAM: Africana Drug-Free Alternative Medicine. Lulu.com. ISBN 1-4116-6915-0.
- Biko Agozino and Unyierie Idem (2008). "Chapter 4 The Militarization of Nigerian Society". In Chris Affor (ed.). Colonial systems of control: criminal justice in Nigeria. University of Ottawa Press. ISBN 978-0-7766-0666-8.
- Biko Agozino (2010). The Debt Penalty. Lulu Enterprises Inc. ISBN 978-0-557-34094-1.
