= Zana Akpagu =

Nigerian academic

Zana Itiunbe Akpagu (born 26 August 1966) is a Nigerian academic and a professor of language. He is the 10th substantive vice-chancellor of the University of Calabar. He was appointed to succeed James Epoke, a Nigerian pathologist whose tenure ended on 30 November 2015. The pro-chancellor commended the council for their ability to maintain decorum, integrity and high standard during the election process.

== Education ==
Zana attended Ipong 1 Primary School, Obudu (1971), and Mary Knoll College, Okuku-Ogoja (now Yala), where he obtained the West African Senior School Certificate. He obtained a Bachelor of Art, in French, in 1982, from the University of Calabar. Following the completion of the compulsory one year youth service program, he later continued at the University of Calabar where he earned a master's degree in French (1985) and proceeded to University of Benin where he received a doctorate degree in African and Caribbean Literatures in French (1995).

== Career ==
Akpagu began his academic career in January 1984 as a Graduate Assistant at the Faculty of Art, University of Uyo, where he rose to the rank of Assistant Lecturer (1985-1991); he became Lecturer II (1991-1994) before he later proceeded to University of Benin as Lecturer I (1998-2004) and later went to University of Calabar as a senior Lecture (1998). He became a full professor of French on October 1, 2007. He is one of the academics that contributed to the development of the curriculum for the teaching of Languages in Nigerian Universities. He had served as Head of Department and Dean of Students' Affairs. He also served as member of the university's governing council. He was a former Dean for the faculty of Arts and Deputy Vice-Chancellor Administration for University of Calabar.

He is a member of various Professional Bodies. He also served in various Important positions such as Commissioner of Education, Cross River (2001-2003); he was also the special adviser to Cross River Governor on Inter-Governmental Affairs (2007-2010) and Special Duties (2010-2012).

== Achievement ==
He holds title of Ushikebe 1 of Ipong, Utekushu 1 of Bebuagbong, Utah Kinde 1 of Bedia, Ntufam Amid Ejagham of the Qua Nation. He also bags the post of Best Performing VC in Nigeria By the Nigeria print journalism magazine.

== Personal life ==
He is a Christian and a knight at catholic church. He is married with kids.
