= Louiza Williams =

Nigerian film executive

Louiza Williams Ogar is a Nigerian film executive and talent manager.

== Early life and education ==
Williams was born in Cross River State, Nigeria, she earned a Bachelor of Science degree in Chemistry from the University of Calabar. Louiza also studied film production at New York Film Academy.

== Career ==
Williams is the head artiste manager at G-Worldwide, she has worked as an artist manager with Nigerian musicians including Kizz Daniel and as a talent consultant for events like the Calabar Carnival.

Williams produced Suga Suga in 2021.

== Awards and recognitions ==
Year	Award	Category	Result	Ref.
2015	The Beatz Awards	Artist Manager of the Year	Nominated	
2016	The Beatz Awards	Best Artist Manager	Nominated	
2018	City People Music Awards	Artiste Manager of the Year	Nominated	
