= Chrisland Schools =

Conglomerate of schools in Nigeria

- Lagos and Abuja; Nigeria

Information
- Established: 1977

Chrisland Schools is a conglomerate of schools that has provided education for nursery, primary and secondary school students in Nigeria, with its schools spread across Lagos and Abuja.

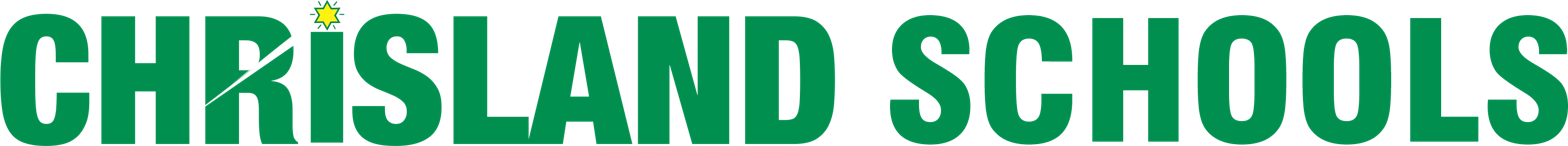

== History ==
The first Chrisland School was founded on 3 October 1977 by an educationist, High Chief Dr. (Mrs.) Winifred Adefolahan Awosika, OON, at Ikeja. Aside the Ikeja campus, the school sites are now in Lekki, Ladipo Oluwole, Festac, Idimu, Victoria Garden City (VGC), and Abuja

=== Schools ===
- Chrisland School Ladipo Oluwole
- Chrisland School Opebi
- Chrisland College Idimu
- Chrisland School VGC
- Chrisland Nursery School VGC
- Chrisland High School VGC
- Chrisland High School Ikeja
- Chrisland Pre-Degree College
- Chrisland School Abuja
- Chrisland School Lekki
- Chrisland High School Abuja
- Chrisland High School Lekki
- Chrisland School Festac Area
- Chrisland High School Festac Area
- Chrisland College Katampe Abuja

=== Extracurricular activities and achievements ===
The VGC campus of the school celebrated her inaugural career day on 30 April 2015. The event was coordinated by the principal of the school, professor John Viljoen

In 2016, Chrisland Schools beat out other participants, including Atlantic Hall, Meadow Hall, Day Waterman College, Temple Schools and Noble house to win the AISEN Volleyball Competition in the Senior Girls Category.

On 3 December 2016, Chrisland Schools, Lagos, won the 10-school Loya Milk Swimming Competition tagged Loya Swim Meet. A competition organised by Loya Milk to boost swimming in secondary schools in the country.

In 2016, Chrisland High School, Ikeja, won the junior category for the Lagos Zone (which involved schools in the Southern part of the country) of the national history competition with 80 points.

David Uwakwe of Chrisland College Idimu in 2016 emerged the third best in the West Africa Senior Secondary School Examination (WASSCE).

Uwetu Obadiah-Franklin of Chrisland High School, Abuja defeated contestants from sixteen other countries to win the 2016 TSL International Schools Essay/ Debate competition in Dubai.

Also in 2016, Chrisland High School VGC finished 1st out of 37 schools that participated in the South Western Zone Nigeria regionals of the International Geography Olympiad.

In the annual literary competition, tagged Teecoks writing competition held in February 2017, Ibukunoluwa Addy of Chrisland College, Idimu, finished first in the prose category of the competition.

As part of its 40th anniversary, Chrisland Schools on the 2nd day of March, 2017, commissioned the Chrisland High Performance Centre at the 24th Annual Inter-house Sports Competition of Chrisland College Idimu, Lagos State with a host of dignitaries attending.

In March 2017, Chrisland School students participated in PROJECT WET; an initiative by Nestle Nigeria Plc in commemoration of the United Nations World Water Day for proper water management in the society as a standard for meeting water challenges to save the environment and ecological system.

Chrisland Schools secured an Outstanding Rating in the 2017 Whole School Evaluation by the Office of Education Quality Assurance, a division of the Ministry of Education.

The exercise was carried out by District 1 Evaluators in Lagos State in November 2016. A revisit was made by the office in March 2017 to validate their findings, and found that the report was reliable and objective.

Chinasa Adaeze Osuji had the highest mark in the world for Cambridge IGCSE Agriculture in the November 2017 exam.

Haneefa Kasim of Chrisland School VGC won the Sidmach Prize after emerging as the Second Overall Best Result in Lagos State in the West African Senior School Certificate Examination (WASSCE, 2020)

In 2021, Chrisland Schools Limited, emerged Winner, Most Outstanding Private Secondary School.

In 2021, three students of Chrisland Schools received the Council of British International Schools (COBIS) awards for outstanding achievements.

Chrisland Secondary School, emerged Winner, Centre for Black and African Arts and Civilization Competition in 2021.

In 2023, two students of Chrisland Schools, Mmesomachukwu Okonkwo and Oluwabukolami Adeyemi, emerged 'Tops in the World' in the Cambridge International AS (Advanced Subsidiary) Level and International General Certificate of Secondary Education (IGSCE) examinations respectively.

== Scholarships ==
In 2013, Chrisland Schools awarded scholarships worth N27 million to six pupils, who came tops at the annual entrance examination that held in March. The award, solely sponsored by the chairman and Founder, Chrisland Schools Limited, Dr.Winifred Awosika, lasts for six years and covers their secondary education.

In the 2014/2015 academic year, the number of scholarships was increased from 6 to 10 pupils according to managing director, Chrisland Schools, Mrs. Ronke Adeyemi. She stated that the founder Dr. Awosika decided to increase scholarship recipients from six to 10 in line with her commitment to encouraging academic excellence.

== Allegations, Controversies and Facts ==
In 2016, the mother of a two-year-old pupil raised the alarm that her child was raped by her teacher, Adeboyega Adenekan. The school denied the claim and stood with the teacher by proclaiming his innocence. The Lagos State Government took over the case and on October 24, 2019, the Ikeja Sexual Offences and Domestic Violence Court found the teacher guilty of a one-count charge of rape of a minor. He was sentenced to sixty years in prison.

On April 17, 2022, a ten-year-old pupil of Chrisland was reported to have been coerced into engaging in a sexual act with some students of the same school at the World School Games in Dubai while performing a truth or dare game. The sexual act was filmed and distributed across multiple social media platforms in Nigeria. The school, in a letter accused the minor of participating in the sexual act willingly and therefore suspended her. The minor's mother in a viral video alleged that the school threatened to kill her daughter if she speaks out, while also insisting that her child was raped. Some popular figures who came across the sex tape opined that it was an intentional sexual act involving two minors, and not a sexual violence. Some people attributed the incidence to lack of parental guidance and monitoring. The news drew public uproar and the Lagos State Government in a statement on April 18, 2022, ordered the immediate closure of the school alongside all other annexes within the state. It also promised to take up the investigation and prosecution. The Lagos State Government ordered that all Chrisland Schools be reopened on Monday, April 25, 2022.

In 2023, one of the students of Chrisland, Miss Whitney Adeniran, slumped during the inter-house sports in one of the Agege stadium in Lagos State. Due to lack of medical facility inside the stadium, she was taken to a nearby hospital where every attempt to revive her proved abortive. Though the school was accused of negligence and was charged to court. The case, which is currently in court, has undergone preliminary investigation (including autopsy) which has revealed that the Whitney died of asphyxia. Under cross examinations from Court proceedings, Whitney Adeniran’s parents admitted to have taken their daughter to Inland Hospital where she has been undergoing treatment for panic disorders previous to the Interhouse event incident.

Few weeks to the sports event, the school informed the parents of their daughter's ill health among which was difficult in breathing. Her father took her to their family doctor at Inland Hospital Lagos where she was checked and prescribed some drugs (Nitrazepam and Amitriptyline). Before she slumped at the stadium, she opted not to participate in the march-past due to her health.

== Notable alumni ==
- Israel Adesanya, mixed martial artist, former UFC Middleweight Champion.
- Omotola Jalade Ekeinde, Nollywood actress.
- Adunni Ade, Nollywood actress and model
- Somkele Iyamah also known as Somkele Iyamah-Idhalama, a Nigerian TV and film actress and model.
- Ifeanyi Chudy Momah, Nigerian lawyer and businessman
- Kaffy born Kafayat Oluwatoyin Shafau is a Nigerian dancer, choreographer, dance instructor and fitness coach.
- David Onyemata, defensive tackle with the Atlanta Falcons of the National Football League.
- Eno Essien, Nigerian technology entrepreneur

== See also ==
- British International School Lagos
- Greenspring School
