= Elizabeth Shoyemi =

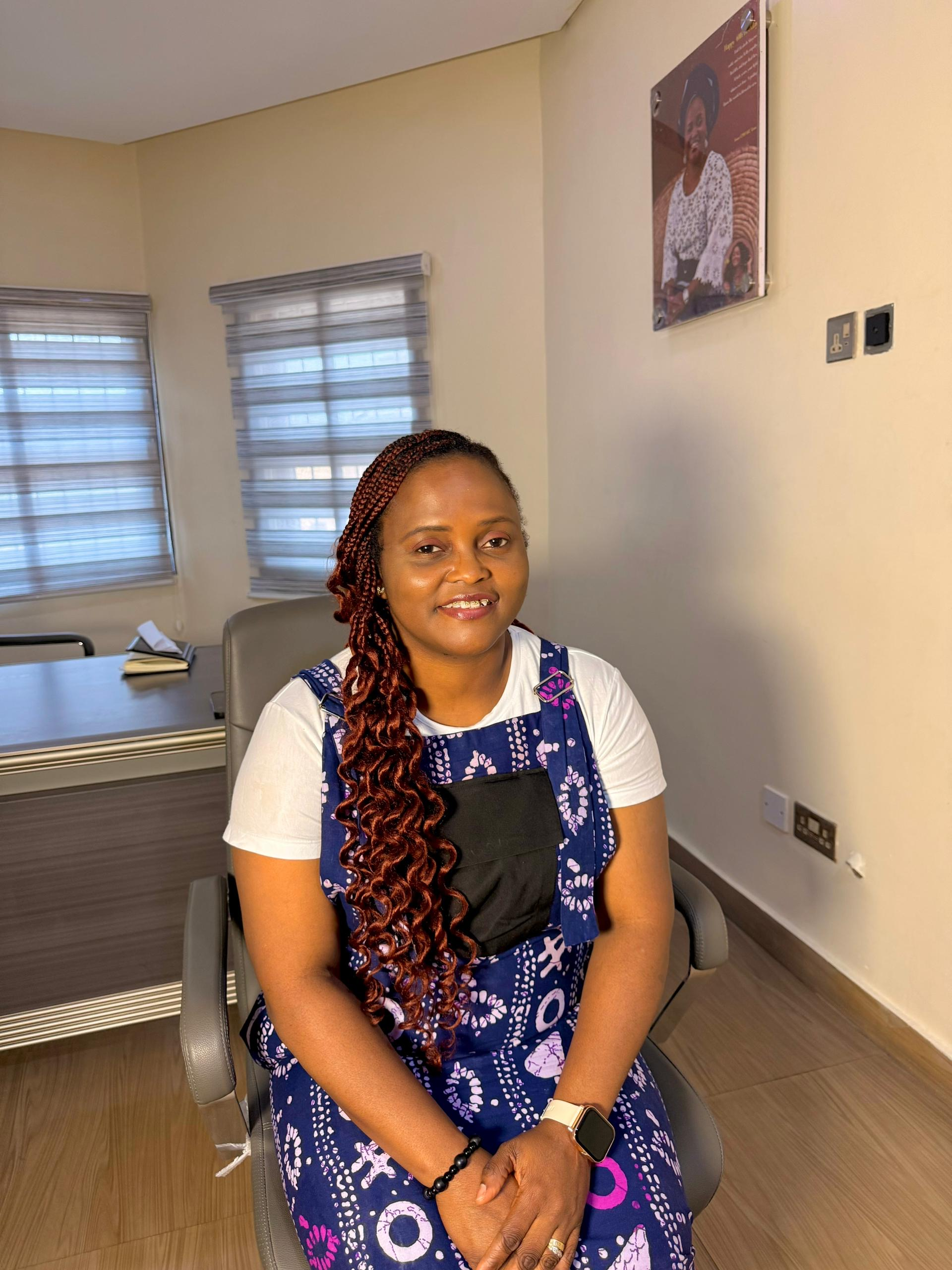
- Citizenship: Nigeria
- Education: University of Calabar University of Lagos Nexford University
- Occupation: Non-Profit Organization
- Organization: Centre for Population Health Initiative (CPHI)
- Known for: SRHR Activism and Advocacy
- Title: Executive Director

Elizabeth Shoyemi is a Nigerian activist and sexual and reproductive health and rights expert. She is the Executive Director of the Centre for Population Health Initiatives (CPHI), a non-profit organization based in Lagos and Port Harcourt, Nigeria, that addresses sexual and reproductive health needs.

== Education ==
She obtained a Bachelor of Science in microbiology from the University of Calabar, a Master of Science in Public Health from the University of Lagos, and a Master of Business Administration from Nexford University.

== Career ==
Shoyemi is the executive director of CPHI, established in June 2020. The organization provides free self-test kits, STI treatments, PrEP and PEP, and other services to key populations in Lagos and Rivers State and has seen over 30,000 interventions. She has over 10 years of experience in the non-profit sector, having worked with organizations such as Population Council, DeltaWomen NGO, and the Nigerian Youth Aid Program, and has also volunteered with the Society for Family Health and Youth Empowerment.

== Works ==
She has co-authored over 20 publications, with over 300 citations, on stigma reduction and behavioral interventions. Shoyemi presents these findings at international conferences in collaboration with global health organizations. She believes that leveraging digital health platforms and social media campaigns is central to HIV vaccine advocacy.

In 2025, CPHI launched condom and lubricant vending machines. While the Nigerian non-profit sector faced funding cuts from USAID, CPHI continued to provide access to these services.

== Personal life ==
Shoyemi is from Akwa Ibom State, lives in Lagos State, and has two children.
