= Dorothy Ufot =

Nigerian lawyer

Dorothy Udeme Ufot SAN, FCIArb (UK), C.Arb.
- Born: Akwa Ibom State, Nigeria
- Education: University of Calabar, University of Lagos
- Occupations: Lawyer, arbitrator
- Spouse: Udeme Ufot, MFR
- Awards: African Arbitrator of the Year 2020
- Website: dorothyufotandco.com

Dorothy Udeme Ufot SAN is a Nigerian lawyer with specialty in Commercial law. She is the first woman from Akwa Ibom State to be elevated to the rank of a Senior Advocate of Nigeria (SAN).

Ufot is the founding partner of Dorothy Ufot & Co., a leading Nigerian full-service law firm, where she heads the international arbitration and litigation departments of the firm. She specialises in international arbitration, litigation and other forms of dispute resolution, including investment treaty arbitration, enforcement of foreign arbitral awards, investment consulting, corporate and commercial law.

Ufot is a member of the Court of Arbitration of the Casablanca International Mediation and Arbitration Centre (CIMAC) Morocco, since 2016. She was designated to serve a six-year term on the panel of arbitrators of the International Centre for the Settlement of Investment Disputes in February 2017. She is a former global vice president of the ICC Commission on Arbitration and ADR, and currently a member of the council of the ICC Institute of World Business Law and vice-chair of the arbitration and ADR commission of ICC Nigeria as well as the treasurer of ICC Nigeria National Committee.

Ufot is a member of the ICC International Court of Arbitration in Paris and was the Vice President of the ICC Commission on Arbitration. In 2000, she became a fellow of the Chartered Institute of Arbitrators London.

== Education ==
Dorothy Ufot was born in Akwa-Ibom State, Nigeria. She is a graduate of the University of Calabar, Calabar, Nigeria; with a bachelor's degree in Political Science in 1983. She then obtained an LL.B degree from the University of Lagos in 1988. On completion of the law school requirements, she was called to the Nigerian Bar in 1989. In 1996, she completed her master's degree in Law (LL.M) and also obtained an Advanced Diploma in Commercial Law and Practice from the University of Lagos, Nigeria in 1998. Dorothy Ufot is married to Mr Udeme Ufot with children.

== Law career ==
Ufot started her legal career after she was called to the Nigerian Bar in 1989. She specializes in commercial litigation and arbitration. In 2009, she became the first female lawyer from Akwa Ibom State to wear the silk gown.

Alongside her legal career, she has also served in different capacities at the Nigerian Stock Exchange, Chevron Oil PLC, and MRS Oil PLC.

== Awards ==
In 2020, Ufot was awarded the African Arbitrator of the Year by the African Arbitration Association, for her contributions in Arbitration and Commercial Law. She is also recognised as a fellow of the Chartered Institute of Arbitrators (UK) (CIArb) and a chartered arbitrator.

== See also ==
- First women lawyers around the world
