= Anthony Ayine =

Nigerian public servant

Former Auditor General For The Federation
- In office 12 January 2017 – 25 October 2020
- Preceded by: Samuel T. Ukura

Auditor General For Local Governments
- In office 1 September 2001 – 31 December 2016

Personal details
- Born: Anthony Mkpe Ayine; 25 October 1960 (age 65) Bokalum, Boki, Cross River State
- Education: Ahmadu Bello University, University of Calabar
- Occupation: Public servant

Anthony Mkpe Ayine (born October 25, 1960, in Lagos, Nigeria) is a Nigerian public servant. He is the former auditor general for the Federation from 12 January 2017 to 25 October 2020.

== Early life and education ==
In 1986, Ayine graduated with Bachelor of Science degree in accounting from Ahmadu Bello University and in 1993 he earned a Master's degree in business administration from University of Calabar.

Ayine became an Associate Member (ACA) of the Institute of Chartered Accountants of Nigeria (ICAN) in 1999 by qualifying in the final examinations set by the institute. He was further elevated to a Fellow of the institute (FCA) in 2010.

Anthony is a Certified Forensic Accountant (CFA) and an Associate Member of the Chartered Institute of Taxation of Nigeria (CITN) as well as the Nigerian Institute of Management (NIM).

== Professional career ==
He began his working career in May 1988 as an Auditor 1 in the then Audit Department (now office of the State Auditor-General) in Cross River State and then joined a state financial institution - Equity and Investment Company Limited, in Calabar, where He advanced to the position of Principal Manager in charge of finance in 1999.

His achievements over the years earned him recognition by the Cross River State Government, where he was offered a position in the Civil service to assume leadership of the Ministry of Finance Incorporated (MOFI) in the State Ministry of Finance.

In September 2001, Anthony was appointed Auditor General for Local Government, a position where his key duties were to audit accounts of all 18 Local Government of Cross River State.

On January 12, 2017, President Muhammadu Buhari GCFR appointed Anthony, Auditor General for the Federation after he emerged as best candidate from the series of tests set by the Nigerian Civil Service. On October 29, 2020, Mr Anthony Ayine retired from the civil service after completing 35 years of service.

== Personal life ==
Anthony Ayine is a devout Christian and happily married with five children. In his leisure periods, he enjoys football, swimming and reading.
