= University of Calabar Library =

Academic library in Nigeria

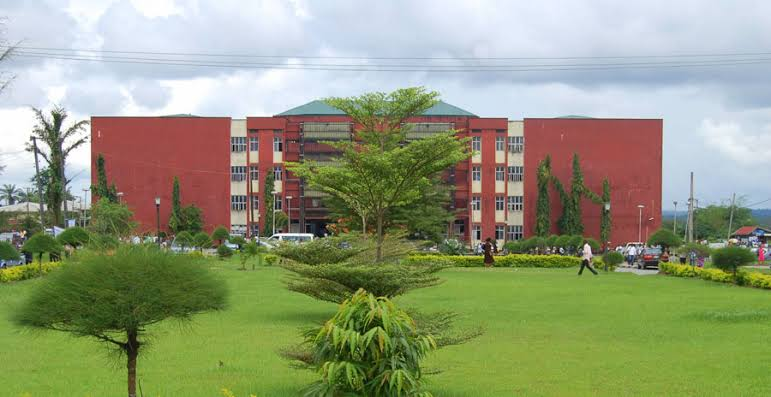
- Location: Calabar, Cross River State, Nigeria
- Type: Academic library
- Established: 1975 (51 years ago)

Collection
- Items collected: Books, journals, newspapers, magazines, sound and music recordings, patents, databases, maps, stamps, prints, drawings and manuscripts.

Access and use
- Access requirements: Open to Students, Researchers

Other information
- Director: Aniebiet Inyang Ntui (University Librarian)
- Website: https://library.unical.edu.ng/

The University of Calabar Library is an autonomous research institution and the main academic library of the University of Calabar, located in Calabar, Cross River State, Nigeria. The current University Librarian is Professor Aniebiet Inyang Ntui.

Established in 1975, the library has since grown to become one of the largest and most comprehensive academic libraries in Nigeria and West Africa, serving as a resource for students, faculty, and researchers in South South Nigeria.

== History ==
The University of Calabar Library was established in 1975, shortly after the creation of the university to support the creative process. Initially, the library was housed in a temporary location, but in 1981 it moved to its current location, a spacious and modern building designed specifically for the library's needs. The library has since undergone several renovations and expansions to accommodate its growing collections and users.

== Organization and Governance ==
The University of Calabar Library is an independent institution governed by the University Librarian. The library is further organized into several departments, including Technical Services, Reader Services, and Special Collections.

The current Chief Executive of the Library is Aniebiet Inyang Ntui, a Nigerian Diplomat and Professor of Library and Information Science, who began serving in February 2022.

The Technical Services department is responsible for the acquisition, cataloging, and processing of library materials. The Reader Services department is responsible for providing reference and information services, as well as circulation and interlibrary loan services. The Special Collections department is responsible for collecting and preserving rare and unique materials, such as manuscripts, archives, and other special collections.

== Collection and Services ==
The University of Calabar Library has a vast collection of print and electronic resources in various fields of study, including humanities, social sciences, natural sciences, engineering, and medicine. The library's holdings include over 200,000 books, 2,000 current journal titles, and numerous electronic resources such as e-books, e-journals, databases, and other online resources.

The library provides a range of services to support research, teaching, and learning activities of the university community. These services include reference and information services, circulation services, interlibrary loan services, document delivery services, and access to electronic resources.

In addition to its traditional library services, the University of Calabar Library also offers specialized services such as bibliographic instruction, orientation for new students and staff, and digital literacy training. The library also hosts various academic events, such as lectures, seminars, workshops, and exhibitions, to promote research and scholarship in the university community.

== See also ==
Academic libraries in Nigeria
