= Eno Essien =

Nigerian technology entrepreneur

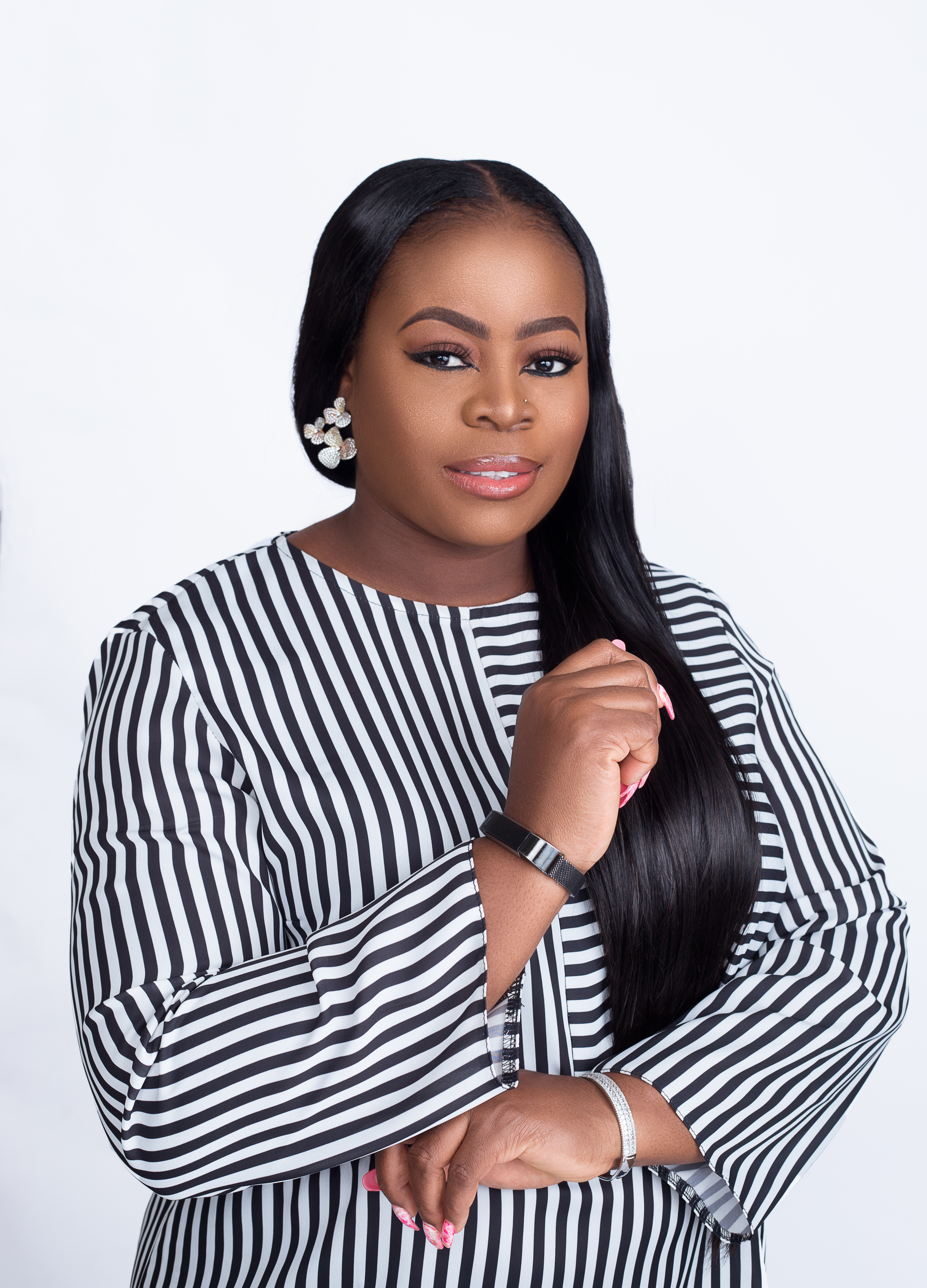
- Born: Eno-Obong Essien; May 13, 1982 (age 44)
- Education: University of Calabar
- Occupation: Technology Entrepreneur
- Years active: 2007–present
- Known for: Founder Of Rheytrak Limited

Eno-Obong Essien is a Nigerian technology entrepreneur and chief executive officer at Rheytrak Limited, a Vehicle Tracking and Recovery company, which she started in 2007. In 2012, she was nominated as the Future Awards Entrepreneur of the Year (Technology) and the only female CEO in the Vehicle Tracking Industry in Nigeria. She serves as the Public Relations Officer of the Association of Telematics Operators of Nigeria and sits on the Governing Council of the Lagos Business School Alumni Association (LBSAA)

== Early life and education ==
Essien was born on 13 May 1982 to Nsikak and Naomi Essien. She did her Secondary School education in Chrisland Schools before proceeding to University of Calabar where she graduated with a bachelor's degree in Microbiology. She has a postgraduate diploma from the National Open University of Nigeria and alumnus of the Lagos Business School.

== Career ==
In 2007, Essien founded Rheytrak Limited, the first female owned vehicle tracking company in Nigeria. She is the Public Relation officer of the Association of Telematics Operations of Nigeria and a member of the governing council of the Lagos Business School Alumni Association.

== Awards and recognition ==
- (2012) Entrepreneur of the Year – The Future Awards.
- (2019) Ladies who inspires - Exquisite Ladies of the Year (ELOY)
- (2019) Guardian News listed Essien as one of the top 10 women who inspire of 2019.
- (2019) Technology Woman of the Year - Her Network.

== Writing ==
In 2024, she authored her debut book titled Unstoppable: My Journey of Resilience and Overcoming Cancer, which documents her journey towards overcoming cancer.
