= Stacey B. Day =

British educator and physician

Stacey B. Day (born 31 December 1927, London) is a British educator and physician. He was educated at the Davenant Foundation Grammar School and was evacuated to Chatteris, Cambridgeshire, during World War II.

Following military service in the British Army (R.A.E.C.), he graduated in medicine and surgery at the Royal College of Surgeons in Ireland (Dublin), 1955. He absolved a PhD in Experimental Surgery at McGill University (1964) and D.Sc in Surgery at the University of Cincinnati (1971).

He was a medical educator in a range of scholarly activity devoted to Medicine and Surgical Research, Biopsychosocial, Social, and Public Health; and to Verse, Essays, Literature, Publishing, and Scholarly Translations into English of diverse writings including the Japanese Wisdom of Hagakure (ISBN 4-87378-389-5) and the Kromeriz Lectures (Problem Maleho Naroda) of Tomáš Garrigue Masaryk, Founding President of Czechoslovakia. From 1956 to 1960, under Professor Owen H. Wangensteen, at the University of Minnesota, he pursued research methods for the Surgical Treatment of Coronary Heart Disease.

Day returned to the University of Minnesota in 1972 to set up the "Bell Museum of Pathology" at UM's School of Medicine. He accompanied Dr Robert A. Good to the Sloan Kettering Institute for Cancer Research in New York City, after Dr Good was named president, to co-ordinate communications. Dr Day introduced the Division of Health Communications/Medical Education at the Sloan Kettering Institute for Cancer Research. Dr Day was professor and head of the Laboratory of Education/Communications, 1973–80, and Professor in the Post-Graduate Division, Cornell University Medical College.

== Accomplishments ==
- He designed and proposed Cancer CIDACS and Consensus Organization in Health Care Systems Management, Biosciences Communications, Health Communications, Integrated Systems for Education for Health.
- Founded "Department of Biopsychosocial and Community Health" at the University of Calabar, Nigeria, 1983–85, interacting with the W.H.O./H.Q. and US-AID.
- Professor and chairman, College of Medicine & Member of University Senate, University of Calabar (Nigeria). Day initiated Education-For-Health programs on the Nigerian Television Authority (TVA) and on radio, producing such public health TV films as Akampka – Primary Health Care, Oncocerciasis in Cross River State, Guinea Worm at Nkpani, and Leprosy in Etinan.
- "Plan For Renewal" for Meharry Medical College, Nashville, collaborated with the W.H.O. (Geneva), to develop a WHO Collaborating Centre in 1987
- Dr Day was honoured by President Ronald Reagan on 2 January 1987
  The vision of Dr Stacey Day, and his fine team at the Center, builds on a community approach to medicine which is truly international in scope. The effort to bring outstanding medical care to other nations and to help them implement effective health service programs for their peoples is vitally important
- Citation Congressional Record, Senate Proceedings of January 6, 1987 (Proceedings and Debates of the 100th Congress, First Session), Washington, Vol. 133, No. 1. Meharry Medical College: Tribute as a World Health Organization Collaborating Center in Health Manpower Development (928<bullet>) 7JA. Hon. William Hill Boner of Tennessee in the House of Representatives. Congressional Record Index 1987
- Citation State of Tennessee, Senate Joint Resolution #55: To Honor Meharry Medical College and Collaborators Tennessee State University and Fisk University on the Designation as the World Health Organization's only US Center for Training World Wide Health Care Providers. Adopted 26 February 1987
- From 1990 to 2000 he served as

Fulbright professor, Charles University, Prague
Visiting Professor, Institute of Tropical Medicine, Post Graduate Medical School, Prague
Permanent Visiting Professor of Medical Education, Oita Medical University, Japan

== Honours ==
- Commendation from the King of Calabar (1984)
- Key to the City of Nashville, Tennessee, USA (1987)
- Tennessee Ambassador of Good Will (1987–97)
- Citation in Congressional Record, Proceedings of 100th Congress, First Session, Washington D.C., Tuesday, 6 January 1987, Vol 133, by Hon. William Hill Boner (TN)in the House of Representatives.
- Festschrift Letters, Library of Congress, "As They See You". WHO Collaborating Center, Nashville, Tennessee (December 1987), including letters to Day from USPresidents Jimmy Carter and Ronald Reagan, Governor Ned McWhorter (TN), Hon. Minister of Education of Nigeria, Dr Jibril Aminu and others
- First Foreign Honorary Member, Hagakure Society, Saga, Japan (1992)
