= David Onyemata =

Nigerian-Canadian American football player (born 1992)

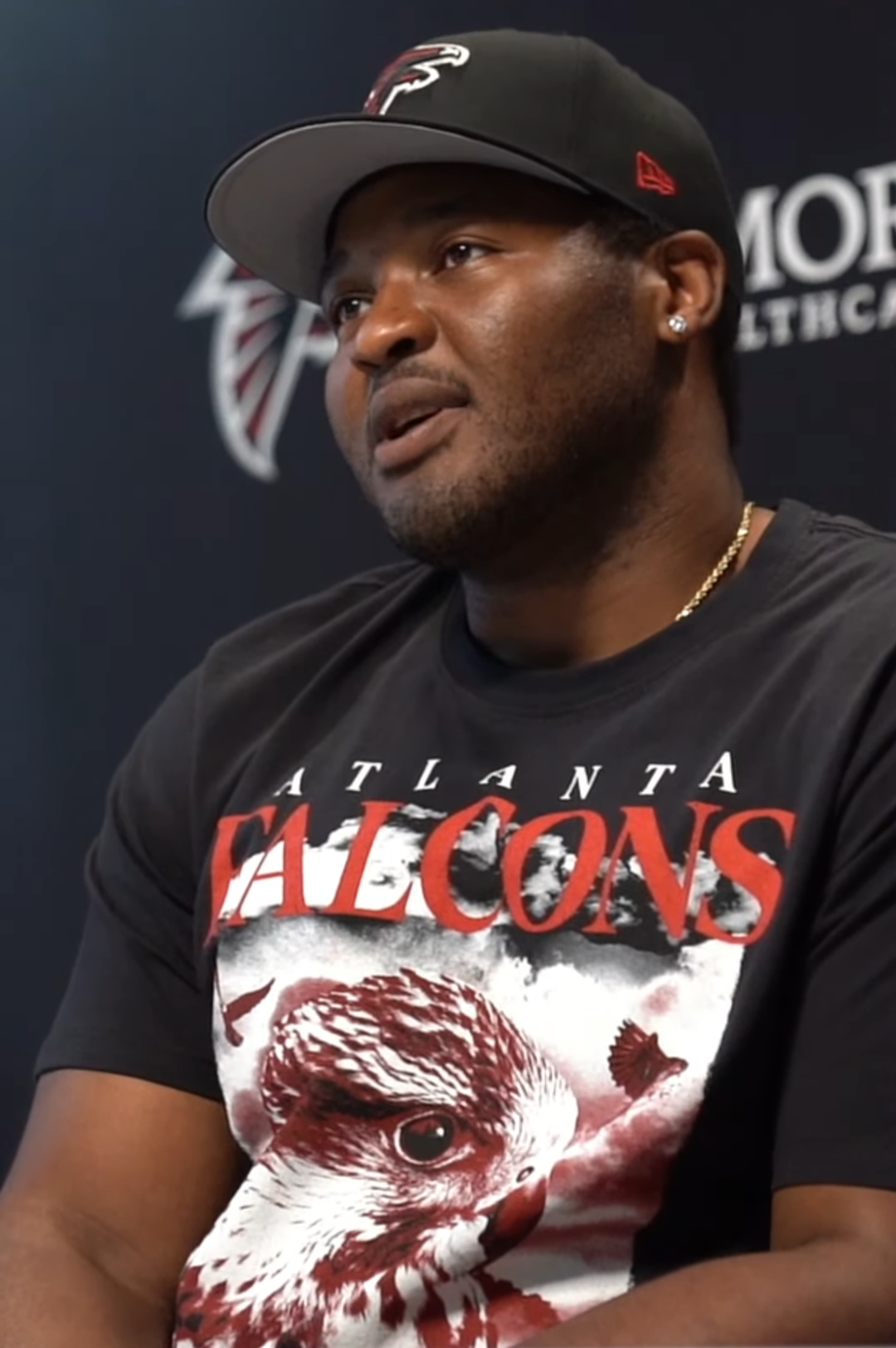
- Onyemata in 2023

No. 93 – New York Jets
- Position: Nose tackle
- Roster status: Injured reserve/designated for return

Personal information
- Born: November 13, 1992 (age 34); Lagos, Nigeria
- Listed height: 6 ft 3 in (1.91 m)
- Listed weight: 300 lb (136 kg)

Career information
- High school: Chrisland Schools (Ikeja, Lagos, Nigeria)
- University: Manitoba (2012–2015)
- NFL draft: 2016: 4th round, 120th overall pick
- CFL draft: 2016: 4th round, 35th overall pick

Career history
- New Orleans Saints (2016–2022); Atlanta Falcons (2023–2025); New York Jets (2026–present)

Awards and highlights
- J. P. Metras Trophy (2015)

Career NFL statistics as of 2025
- Total tackles: 401
- Sacks: 31.0
- Forced fumbles: 3
- Fumble recoveries: 2
- Pass deflections: 10
- Interceptions: 1
- Stats at Pro Football Reference

David Onyemata (born November 13, 1992) is a Nigerian professional American football nose tackle for the New York Jets of the National Football League (NFL). He played college football for the Manitoba Bisons.

== Early life ==
Onyemata is a native of Lagos, Nigeria, where he attended the Chrisland Schools but he graduated from Rainbow College. He immigrated, on his own, to Winnipeg in 2011 to attend college at the University of Manitoba.

== University career ==
Onyemata had never seen a gridiron football game until he came to Winnipeg, but he became a standout player for the Manitoba Bisons. He won the 2015 J. P. Metras Trophy as the top down lineman in CIS football, was invited to play in the East–West Shrine Game, and became the top Canadian prospect in the 2016 draft.

== Professional career ==
Pre-draft measurables
Height	Weight	Arm length	Hand span	Wingspan	40-yard dash	10-yard split	20-yard split	20-yard shuttle	Three-cone drill	Vertical jump	Broad jump	Bench press
6 ft 3 1/4 in (1.91 m)	300 lb (136 kg)	33 1/4 in (0.84 m)	10 3/8 in (0.26 m)	6 ft 10 1/4 in (2.09 m)	5.06 s	1.66 s	2.89 s	4.65 s	7.25 s	33.0 in (0.84 m)	9 ft 11 in (3.02 m)	33 reps
All values from Pro Day

=== New Orleans Saints ===
Onyemata was selected by the New Orleans Saints in the fourth round of the 2016 NFL draft as the 120th overall pick. He was the first player from the University of Manitoba ever selected for the NFL draft, and the twelfth NFL draft pick from the CIS (now U Sports). The Saints traded their fifth round picks for 2016 and 2017 to Washington in order to draft Onyemata. He was also selected by the Saskatchewan Roughriders in the fourth round of the 2016 CFL draft.

In 2018, Onyemata played in all 16 games with four starts, recording 35 tackles, 4.5 sacks, and a forced fumble.

Onyemata was suspended the first game of the 2019 season for violating the league's substances of abuse policy. He was reinstated to the active roster on September 10, 2019.

On March 18, 2020, Onyemata signed a three-year, $27 million contract extension with the Saints.

In Week 9 against the Tampa Bay Buccaneers on Sunday Night Football, Onyemata recorded his first career interception off a pass thrown by Tom Brady during the 38–3 win.

On March 3, 2021, Onyemata agreed to convert part of his $7 million base salary into a signing bonus to free up cap space for New Orleans. On July 16, Onyemata was suspended six games by the NFL after testing positive for a banned substance.

=== Atlanta Falcons ===
On March 16, 2023, Onyemata signed a three-year, $35 million contract with the Atlanta Falcons, reuniting him with his former Saints position coach, Ryan Nielsen, who was named the Falcons defensive coordinator.

In his three years in Atlanta, Onyemata was an every-game starter as an interior defensive lineman, posting career numbers across the board.

=== New York Jets ===
On March 12, 2026, Onyemata signed a one-year, $10.5 million contract with the New York Jets. He suffered a groin injury in Week 2 and was placed on injured reserve on September 22.

== NFL career statistics ==
Legend
**Bold**	Career high

=== Regular season ===
Year	Team	Games		Tackles					Interceptions					Fumbles				
Year	Team	GP	GS	Cmb	Solo	Ast	Sck	TFL	Int	Yds	Lng	TD	PD	FF	Fum	FR	Yds	TD
2016	NOR	16	0	18	11	7	0.0	0	0	0	0	0	0	0	0	0	0	0
2017	NOR	16	6	38	18	20	2.0	4	0	0	0	0	1	0	0	0	0	0
2018	NOR	16	4	35	23	12	4.5	4	0	0	0	0	1	1	0	0	0	0
2019	NOR	15	15	32	22	10	3.0	3	0	0	0	0	1	0	0	0	0	0
2020	NOR	15	15	44	20	24	**6.5**	**10**	**1**	**3**	**3**	0	2	0	0	0	0	0
2021	NOR	11	11	34	12	22	2.0	2	0	0	0	0	0	0	0	**1**	-6	0
2022	NOR	**17**	**17**	43	25	18	5.0	5	0	0	0	0	1	0	0	**1**	**0**	0
2023	ATL	14	14	50	25	25	4.0	6	0	0	0	0	**3**	**2**	0	0	0	0
2024	ATL	**17**	16	45	23	22	3.0	8	0	0	0	0	1	0	0	0	0	0
2025	ATL	**17**	**17**	**62**	**29**	**33**	1.0	7	0	0	0	0	0	0	0	0	0	0
Career		154	115	401	208	193	31.0	49	1	3	3	0	10	3	0	2	-6	0

=== Postseason ===
Year	Team	Games		Tackles					Interceptions					Fumbles				
Year	Team	GP	GS	Cmb	Solo	Ast	Sck	TFL	Int	Yds	Lng	TD	PD	FF	Fum	FR	Yds	TD
2017	NOR	2	0	3	1	2	0.0	0	0	0	0	0	0	0	0	0	0	0
2018	NOR	2	1	4	**2**	2	0.0	0	0	0	0	0	0	0	0	0	0	0
2019	NOR	1	1	3	**2**	1	0.0	0	0	0	0	0	0	0	0	0	0	0
2020	NOR	2	2	**5**	1	**4**	0.0	0	0	0	0	0	0	0	0	0	0	0
Career		7	4	15	6	9	0.0	0	0	0	0	0	0	0	0	0	0	0
