= Suga Suga (film) =

2021 Nigerian romantic comedy film by Richard Omos Iboyi

- Directed by: Richard Omos Iboyi
- Written by: Priscilla Okpara
- Produced by: Festus Ehimare (exec.); Louiza Williams
- Starring: Taiwo Obileye; Ayo Adesanya; Tana Adelana; Wole Ojo; Charles Inojie; Gregory Ojefua
- Cinematography: Toyin Odukoya
- Music by: Sugarboy; Kizz Daniel
- Production company: G-Worldwide Entertainment
- Distributed by: Bluepictures Distributions; Amazon Prime Video
- Release date: 30 April 2021
- Running time: 110 minutes
- Country: Nigeria
- Language: English

Suga Suga is a 2021 Nigerian romantic comedy film written by Priscilla Okpara directed by Richard Omos Iboyi. The film stars Taiwo Obileye, Ayo Adesanya, Tana Adelana and Wole Ojo in the lead roles. The film had its theatrical release on 30 April 2021 and received mixed reviews from critics.

== Cast ==
- Taiwo Obileye as Dr. Durojaiye
- Ayo Adesanya as Ireti
- Tana Adelana as April Yekini
- Wole Ojo as Aaron
- Charles Inojie as Banabas
- Gregory Ojefua as Ovie
- Vivian Anani as Miss Banjo
- Christian Paul as Chief Wema
- Priscilla Okpara as Becky
- Mc Mbakara as Felix

== Synopsis ==
The film is based on a wealthy billionaire who lusts after young girls while his family members are angry with him. On the other hand, a young intelligent man decides to work as a maid at the mansion of the billionaire after failing to get a decent job as a driver.

== Production ==
The film project marked the maiden feature film production venture for the Nigerian 360 entertainment company G-Worldwide Entertainment. The film executive producer was Emperor Geezy, credited as Festus Ehimare, and produced by Louiza Williams who graduated from the New York Film Academy. The filming and post-production works of the film were wrapped up in early 2021.

== Premiere and release ==
The film was premiered nationwide in Nigeria on 30 April 2021, in cinemas, and was distributed by Bluepictures Distributions. Suga Suga was released on 30 April 2021 in Nigeria by G-Worldwide Entertainment. The film was released to over 200 countries, including the United States, United Kingdom, and Germany on 16 May 2022 via Amazon Prime Video.
