= Centre for Democracy and Development =

Organization in Abuja, Nigeria

- Abbreviation: CDD, CDD-West Africa
- Formation: 1997
- Founded at: London, United Kingdom
- Type: Think tank
- Legal status: Civil Society
- Purpose: Democracy, Human Rights, Peace and Human Security
- Headquarters: House 16, A7 Street Mount Pleasant Estate (CITEC), Jabi-Airport Road, Mbora District, Abuja, Nigeria
- Location: Abuja
- Region served: West Africa
- Official language: English
- Director: Dauda Garuba
- Website: cddwestafrica.org

The Centre for Democracy and Development (CDD) is a non-profit organization headquartered in Abuja, Nigeria. The organization aims to promote the values of democracy, peace and human rights in Africa, particularly in the West African sub-region.

Established in the United Kingdom in 1997 and subsequently registered in Lagos in 1999, the CDD mobilizes global opinion and resources for democratic development and provides a space for critical reflection on the challenges posed to the democratization and development processes in West Africa. It also provides alternatives and best practices for sustaining democracy and development in the region.

== History ==
The CDD was founded in 1997 in London at a time when Nigeria was under military rule. Its first activity was to organize a roundtable discussion on the future of democracy in Nigeria. One of the founding members was Biko Agozino, a criminologist whose books explored the impact of colonization on the way racial and ethnic minorities are treated by justice systems worldwide. The Center works on policy-oriented scholarship on introducing and improving democratic processes, improving economic governance, safety and development throughout Africa. The Centre is engaged in capacity-building work, policy analysis and advocacy, and as a research reference point on democratic governance, human security, and people-centered development in the region.

== Activities ==
CDD has offices in Lagos, Abuja, and Maiduguri in Nigeria and an international office in London. The center conducts research on democratization and governance and also trains groups and individuals who are promoting democracy and development in the region. In collaboration with the Kituo Cha Katiba (East African Centre for Constitutional Development), the CDD has run a capacity-building project funded by the Ford Foundation. The project sponsors East African women lawyers for graduate masters programs.

== Promoting accountability by monitoring election campaign promises ==
The Buharimeter project, supported by the Open Society Initiative for West Africa (OSIWA), was a tool designed to track over 222 election pledges made by President Muhammadu Buhari, and the All Progressives Congress (APC) to Nigerians before the 2015 general elections. Buharimeter's one-year report did provide a synopsis of citizens' perception of the implications of the actions of the government and also revealed the degree to which Nigerians were aware of campaign promises and the actions carried out to achieve them.

Knowledge about the existence of the Buharimeter and its findings have taken a global outlook. Aside from highlighting how the initiative was widely reported internationally, Buharimeter is now listed as one of the promise tracking initiatives on the Duke Reporters' Lab. The one-year report was the fifth report released since the project's launch. Others include 30 days, 60 days, 100 days, 7 months' and mid-term assessment reports published in July 2017 and can be viewed on Buharimeter reports. In May 2018, the Buharimeter team at the CDD was expected to release a third-year report which would score the performance of Nigeria's President after 3 years.

== Work on Boko Haram insurgence ==
The CDD organised the first intervention that brought Borno residents, the government, and civil society together at the height of the insurgency in 2011. Since then, it has organised several forums, developed counter radical narratives, and supported the Operation Safe Corridor (OSC) program of the Nigerian Government on deradicalisation, rehabilitation of former Boko Haram militants, and has a Memorandum of Understanding (MOU) with the Presidential Committee on the North East Initiative.

== Work on disinformation and misinformation ==
The Centre runs a project on disinformation and misinformation in Nigeria. It has released reports on the fake news ecosystem in Nigeria. In collaboration with Daily Trust, it launched a fact-checking website.

== Leadership ==
The current Director of CDD is Dr. Dauda Garuba.
