= Chido Onumah =

Nigerian journalist

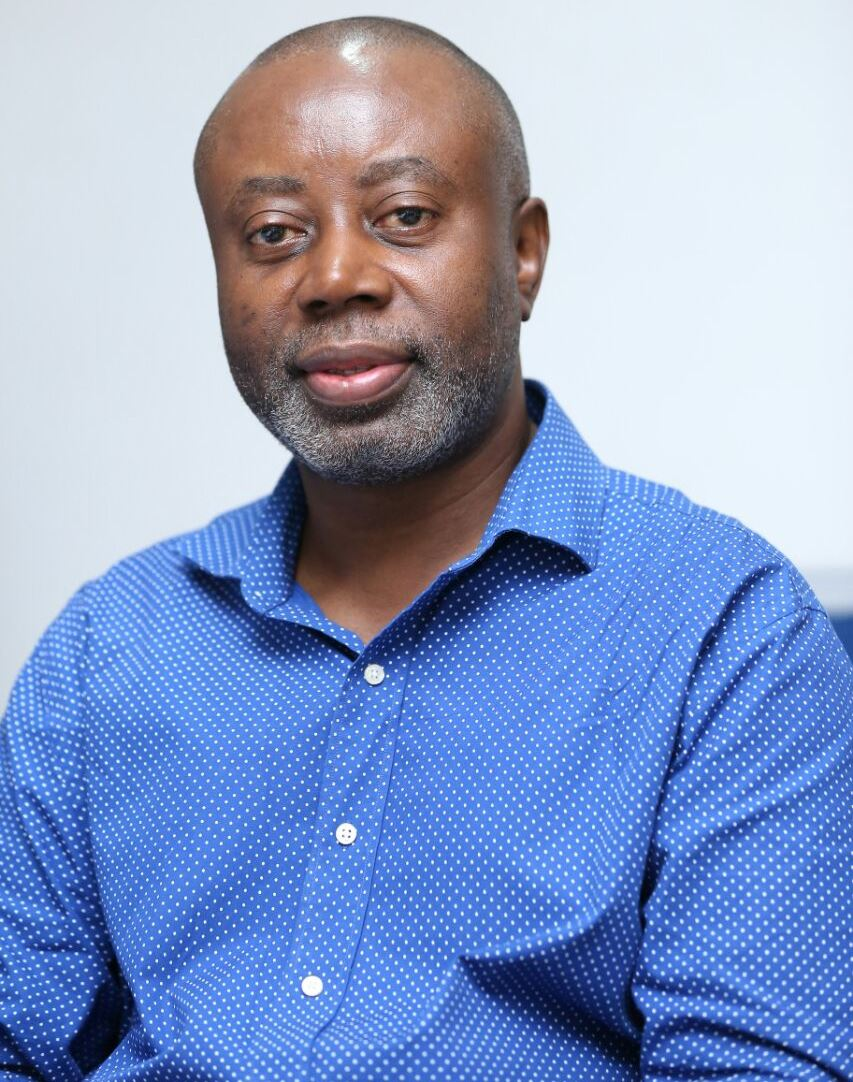
- Image of Chido Onumah
- Born: 1966 (age 59–60)
- Education: University of Calabar, Autonomous University of Barcelona, University of Western Ontario
- Occupations: Journalist, writer, rights activist
- Notable work: Remaking Nigeria: Sixty Years, Sixty Voices, Nigeria is Negotiable, Time to Reclaim Nigeria
- Awards: Clement Mwale Prize for courage in journalism, Kudirat Initiative for Democracy KIND Award for excellence in journalism, Devatop Anti-Human Trafficking Ambassador, Nigeria, The Jerry Rogers Writing Award, Alfred W. Hamilton Scholarship

Chido Onumah (born 1966) is a Nigerian journalist, writer, and rights activist. He has worked for over three decades as a journalist, rights activist and media trainer in Nigeria, Ghana, Canada, India, the US, the Caribbean and Europe. He holds a PhD in Communication and Journalism from the Autonomous University of Barcelona, UAB, Spain. He is a columnist with several newspapers.

Onumah was arrested and detained by Nigeria's State Security Services (SSS) at Abuja airport on his arrival from Spain for wearing a T-shirt with the inscription "We Are All Biafrans".

== Education ==
Onumah studied at the University of Calabar, Cross River State, Nigeria, and received an MA in journalism from the University of Western Ontario, London, Ontario, Canada. He holds a PhD in communication and journalism from the Autonomous University of Barcelona, UAB, Spain.

== Career ==
Onumah worked and wrote for several media houses in Nigeria, including; The Sentinel magazine, the Guardian, AM News, PM News, The News/Tempo, Concord, Punch and Thisday newspapers, before moving to Accra, Ghana, in 1996. He served as associate editor of the Insight newspaper, assistant editor of Third World Network's African Agenda magazine, coordinator, West African Human Rights Committee and correspondent for African Observer magazine, New York, and AfricaNews Service, Nairobi, Kenya.

Between 2001 and 2002, Onumah volunteered for the London Cross Cultural Learner Centre, London, Ontario, Canada, working on integration and provision of information for refugees and new immigrants to Canada. From 2002 to 2004, Onumah worked as Director of Africa programmes at the Panos Institute in Washington, DC.

In 2003, Onumah spent time in Haiti and Dominican Republic where he reported on people living with HIV/AIDS, and on a cross-cultural dialogue between African and Caribbean journalists. Between December 2001 and January 2002, Onumah was in New Delhi, India, on fellowship with the Indian Express newspaper, reporting on international issues.

In 2005, he began volunteering for the World Computer Exchange WCE, seeking donations of used computers and assisting in recruiting African community organizations, universities, and secondary schools. Between 2006 and 2008, he served as pioneer coordinator of the crime prevention unit (Fix Nigeria Initiative) of the Economic and Financial Crimes Commission (EFCC) in Nigeria, working on a civil society anti-corruption agenda for the country, and in partnership with the Wole Soyinka Centre for Investigative Journalism developed programs on ethics and investigative reporting for Nigerian journalists.

=== African Centre for Media & Information Literacy ===
Onumah is coordinator of the African Centre for Media & Information Literacy (AFRICMIL), Abuja, Nigeria. The African Centre for Media & Information Literacy focuses on media, information, research, advocacy, and training. AFRICMIL was set up in 2008 following the resolution of the 1st Africa media & Information Literacy Conference in July 2008 in Abuja, organised in conjunction with British Council, Nigeria, and the National Film & Video Censors Board (NFVCB).

=== Pan-African Alliance for Media & Information Literacy ===
Chido Onumah is the chair of the Pan-African Alliance for Media & Information Literacy (PAMIL) and former Co-Chair of Global Alliance on Media and Information Literacy (GAPMIL).

== Controversies ==
=== We Are All Biafrans ===
Onumah has generated intense and continuous discussions on governance, human rights abuses, and corruption, through his expository articles and essays. He has often questioned the credibility of some political office holders and frowned at exclusion of youth in governance. One of his books titled: We Are All Biafrans, which talks about restructuring Nigeria, has continued to generate debate among political leaders, the media and civil society across Nigeria. The book uses Biafra as a metaphor for the various agitations in Nigeria. It calls for political restructuring as a basis for enhancing Nigeria's unity and building an egalitarian society.

=== Arrest by State Security Services ===
Onumah was arrested and detained by Nigeria's State Security Services (SSS) on 29 September 2019 at 5pm at Nnamdi Azikiwe International Airport, Abuja for wearing a T-shirt with the inscription "We Are All Biafrans". He traveled to Barcelona where he bagged a PhD in Communication and Journalism from the Autonomous University of Barcelona, UAB, and was waiting for his luggage when SSS arrested him and detained him till 11pm. He was later released and the SSS denied arresting him.

== Awards ==
- 1997: Clement Mwale Prize for courage in journalism, AFRICANEWS SERVICE (Kenya)
- 1999: Kudirat Initiative for Democracy KIND Award for excellence in journalism (Nigeria)
- 2001: Alfred W. Hamilton Scholarship - Canadian Association of Black Journalists
- 2001: William C. Heine Fellowship for International Media Studies, University of Western Ontario, Canada
- 2002: The Jerry Rogers Writing Award, University of Western Ontario, Canada
- 2017: Devatop Anti-Human Trafficking Ambassador, Nigeria.

== Publications ==
Onumah is the author of the following books:

- "Remaking Nigeria: Sixty Years, Sixty Voices" (ed.)
- "Testimony to Courage: Essays in Honour of Dapo Olorunyomi (with Fred Adetiba)", (ed.)
- "We Are All Biafrans (2016),
- Nigeria is Negotiable (2013) and
- Time to Reclaim Nigeria (Essays 2001-2011) 2011.

He has edited books on various subjects, including

- Making Your Voice Heard: A Media Toolkit for Children & Youth (2004);
- Anti-Corruption Advocacy Handbook (with Comfort Idika-Ogunye) 2006;
- Youth Media: A Guide to Literacy and Social Change (with Lewis Asubiojo) 2008;
- Understanding Nigeria and the New Imperialism (with Biodun Jeyifo, Bene Madunagu, and Kayode Komolafe) 2006;
- Sentenced in God’s Name: The Untold Story of Nigeria’s "Witch Children" (with Lewis Asubiojo) 2011; and
- Media and Information Policy and Strategy Guidelines (with Grizzle, A., Moore, P., Dezuanni, M., Asthana, S., Wilson, C. and Banda, F.).

== Sources ==
- "About Us". Canadian Association of Black Journalists. 25 February 2007.
- UAB - Universitat Autònoma de Barcelona. "Universitat Autònoma de Barcelona - UAB Barcelona".
- "PANOS CARIBBEAN:"Real People - Real Voices!"".
- "TWN-AFRICA".
- "Latest News, Breaking News Live, Current Headlines, India News Online - The Indian Express".
- "Welcome -- Wole Soyinka Centre for Investigative Journalism". 13 March 2016.
- "World Computer Exchange - Technology + Education = Potential".
- Onumah, Chido (2004). Making Your Voice Heard: A Media Toolkit for Children & Youth. ISBN 978-978-8033-87-5.
- Madunagu, Edwin; Jeyifo, Biodun (2006). Understanding Nigeria and the new imperialism: essays 2000-2006. Clear Lines. ISBN 978-978-38525-1-8.
- "Yahoo! Groups".
- Media and information literacy: policy and strategy guidelines
- "African Centre for Media & Information Literacy".
- "British Council - Nigeria".
- "This site is undergoing maintenance! Please check back later".
- "UNESCO".
- "United Nations Alliance of Civilizations - UNAOC". United Nations Alliance of Civilizations (UNAOC).
- Global Forum for Partnership on MIL (GFPMIL)
