= Akeju (singer) =

Nigerian singer, songwriter

- Also known as: Akeju
- Born: Abass K.M Akeju; Accra, Ghana
- Genres: Afrobeats, afropop, R&B, dancehall, highlife
- Occupations: Singer, songwriter, producer, content manager, film maker.
- Instruments: Vocals, piano, drums, conga, guitar
- Years active: 2015—present
- Label: BSMG STUDIOS

Abass K.M Akeju, most often known by his stage name Akeju, is a US-based Nigerian musician known for his 2017 single "Kiss and Tell".

He launched Inside Nollywood in 2021 and also produced a unity song for ARDN Red campaign. He is a U.S-based artist whose genre of music is Afro-beat. He won the Africa Diaspora Face of Change award in 2022.

== Early life and education ==
Akeju was born in Ghana to Nigerian parents. His mother was from Ilorin in Kwara State, and his father was from Ogun State. In his early life, he lived in Ghana where he developed a strong passion for music. In an interview with Tribune, a Nigerian news portal, Akeju said he moved to the United States where he had his first degree in IT from Wagner College, a bachelor's degree in fine arts from New York Film Academy and NYU Institute of Music where he studied music art and business.

== Career ==
He launched Inside Nollywood, a documentary that featured Nollywood, where they discussed their personal experiences and fans got to know them better. The documentary was featured on Amazon Prime Video, New York Times Signature billboard and Connecticut billboards.

Akeju Abass produced Unity song for the African Renaissance and Diaspora Network (ARDN) which was premiered in 2022 during the Africa Day Celebration featuring five African female artists.

He launched Faces of Afrobeats in 2021 while top Nigerian artist such as 2face, Wizkid and others joined the campaign.

== Music ==
His songs are often a mix of afro-beat and hip-hop.

Akeju collaborated with Beenie Man, the Jamaican Grammy award-winning artist, on the remix of Kiss and Tell.

His hit single "Kiss and Tell" was used as soundtrack for a Nollywood (African) movie with the same title, starring Nadia Buari and Queeneth Agbor. Omoge was also used as soundtrack for a movie with the same title, starring Ik Ogbonna, Esther Audu, Perikles Mandinga to name a few.

== Discography ==
- Kiss and Tell ft. Beenie Man (2019)
- Kiss and Tell original (2018)
- Omoge (2018)
- Luv (2017)
- Susanna (2017)
- Sweetie. Ft. Joey B (2018)
- Emotions ft. Lil scrappy (2018)
- Loving you. Ft. Khadi diop
- Sade. Ft. Tome (2020)
- Smile. Ft. Fourever21 (2020)
- Whatsup (2020)

== Awards ==
Year	Award	Category	Result	Ref.
2022	Africa Diaspora award	Face of Change	Won	
