= Nkechi Nwaogu =

Nigerian politician

- In office June 2003 – June 2007
- Preceded by: Ohiagu
- Succeeded by: Eziuche Ubani
- Constituency: Osisioma/Obingwa and Ugwunagbo Federal Constituency

Senator Representing Abia Central Senatorial District
- In office June 2007 – June 2015
- Preceded by: Senator Chris Adighije
- Succeeded by: Senator T A Orji
- Constituency: Abia Central Senatorial District

Personal details
- Born: Nkechi Justina Nwaogu
- Party: NDC
- Education: Brunel University
- Occupation: Banker, Politician
- Profession: Banker

Nkechi Justina Nwaogu//, CON is a Nigerian politician and banker, founder and CEO Libra Investment. She is the former Chairman Governing Council and Pro Chancellor University of Calabar. Nwaogu was the Member representing Osisioma Ngwa, Ugwunagbo and Obi Ngwa Federal Constituency in the Federal House of Representatives from 2003 to 2007. In 2007 she was elected as the senator representing Abia Central Senatorial District. In 2011 she was re-elected for a second term.

By June 2015, Senator Nkechi Justina Nwogu left the PDP, the basis of candidate imposition by the PDP which did not suit her interest.

In 2016, Nwaogu officially declared her membership of the ruling party the All Progressives Congress (APC).

Senator Nwaogu officially joined the Nigeria Democratic Congress in May, 2026

== Background ==
Nkechi Nwaogu has served two terms as senator, and was the pro chancellor of the University of Calabar. She married Roland Nwaogu.

== Educational, political and professional career ==
Nkechi Nwaogu completed her First School Leaving Certificate in 1967 at Aba Township School and later attended Immaculate Heart Secondary School in 1975. She left Nigeria for London where she obtained a Diploma in Printing Management from the London College of Communication. By 1981, she got her post-graduate degree in management studies (major in finance) from London South Bank University, then attended Brunel University of London in England where she obtained an M.sc degree in management (major in finance) in 1984. In 2018, she obtained a doctorate degree in political science from the University of Nigeria.

In her first tenure in the upper legislative chamber, she was the chairperson for the senate committee on banking, insurance and other financial institutions. She was chairman of the senate committee on gas resources.

She became a member of the ECOWAS Parliament in 2005, and was the executive director for the West African region of the African Parliamentarians' Network Against Corruption, APNAC.

In 1987 Nwaogu returned to Nigeria to complete the one-year compulsory National Youth Service Corps scheme, and worked for the International Merchant Bank as a credit analyst. Thereafter she joined Commerce Bank as deputy manager and later Diamond Bank as branch manager. She set up an investment company, Libra Investments Ltd, which provided credit to rural traders and artisans.

In December 2011, Nwaogu's April election was overturned by a Nigerian Court of Appeals.

== Pro Chancellor University of Calabar ==
Nwaogu was appointed the pro chancellor and chairman of the governing board, University of Calabar. Her achievements in her tenure included the election of the university's first female Vice Chancellor, Professor Florence Obi.

== Awards and recognition ==
- Commander of the order of the Niger, CON by Former President Goodluck Ebele Jonathan
- Ugo Nwanyi Ndigbo by Eze Nri
- Outstanding Leadership Award by the International Inner Wheel, Nigeria
- Award of Excellence in Community Service by Rotary Club of Aba
- Award of Recognition by Igbo Women Union
- Ngwa Ambassador by Ngwa Women Cultural Association, Lagos
- A special recognition by Ngwa women of Los Angeles, California, USA
