= Queeneth Agbor =

Nigerian actress and media personality

- Born: Calabar, Nigeria
- Citizenship: Nigeria
- Education: University of Calabar
- Occupations: Actor; Media personality
- Notable work: Kiss and tell (2019)

Queeneth Agbor (born in Calabar) is a Nigerian actress and media personality. Raised in Calabar, she graduated in microbiology from the University of Calabar. She relocated to Lagos, after feeling that people were "pressurising" her to become an actress. She has become known for her roles in Nollywood films such as Painful Kingdom with Olu Jacobs, Hooked with Francis Duru and The Movement.

== Career ==
Agbor enrolled in the Lagos-based Royal Arts Academy, where she studied acting for three months. In October 2014, she made her professional debut. Since then, she has appeared in films with a number of prominent actors, including Ngozi Ezeonu, Charles Inojie, Chika Ike, Ebube Nwagbo, and Eve Esin.

== Filmography ==
- Kiss and tell (2019)
- Omoge(2019)
- The Marriage Rules (2018)
- Spiritual Contact (2018)
- St.Mary (2018)
- Breaking cord (2018)
- Finally In Love (2017)
- Incredible Father (2017)
- Ibu and the Akwa Ibom girls (2017)
