= Florence Obi =

Nigerian academic

Florence Banku Obi
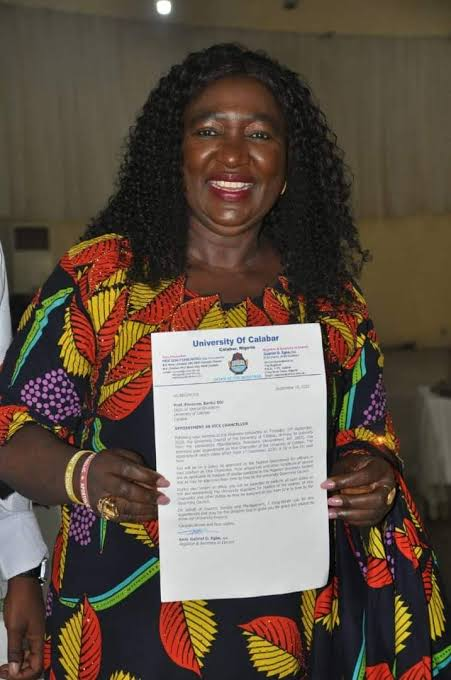

11th Vice-Chancellor, University of Calabar
- Preceded by: Prof. Zana Akpagu

Personal details
- Born: Florence Banku Obi Bansan–Osokom, Boki Local Government Area of Cross River State, Nigeria
- Education: University of Calabar; Jordanhill College
- Occupation: Lecturer; author; professor of special education
- Website: myunical.edu.ng

Florence Banku Obi is a Nigerian academic, author and a professor of education with specialization in psychology and special needs education. She is the 11th substantive vice-chancellor of the University of Calabar and the first female vice-chancellor since the inception of the institution. After her appointment as the new VC, Senator Ovie Omo-Agege who chairs the Senate Adhoc Committee on Constitution Review, described Prof. Obi as "an astute educational icon". She was previously the deputy vice-chancellor, academics and commissioner for women affairs in Cross River State. She was a candidate in the 2015 VC election but was not elected until 2020, when she became the first woman to be elected. In 2007, she served as the social development and member of the executive council, Cross River State.

== Early life and education ==
Obi is from Bansan–Osokom, Boki Local Government Area of Cross River State. She started her education at St Bridget's Primary School, Ogep Osokom, Boki, Cross River State where she got her F.S.LC, finishing in 1969. She then enrolled at the St. Thomas's Teachers Training College, Ogoja, Cross River State, where she graduated in 1983. She obtained her degree in special education at University of Calabar. In 1990, she got her MEd in special education at the same institution. She moved to the Jordanhill College where she obtained a PGCEE in 1993. In 2002, she finished her PhD in psychology of education, University of Calabar.

== Academic career ==
In 1990, Obi started her academic career as an assistant lecturer at the Institute of Education, University of Calabar. In 1992, she won a six-month postgraduate scholarship to Jordan-Hill College of Education, under the World University Service (WUS), World-Wide Fund for Nature (WWF) and the Nigerian Conservation Foundation (NCF) during an interview for staff of the Institute of Education.

After the scholarship offer, she was placed in charge of the WWF/NCF funded schools and community education programmes. In 2007, she became a professor of special needs education.

== Personal life ==
Florence Obi is married and has four children and six grandchildren.
