= Dike Chukwumerije =

Nigerian author, spoken word and performance poet

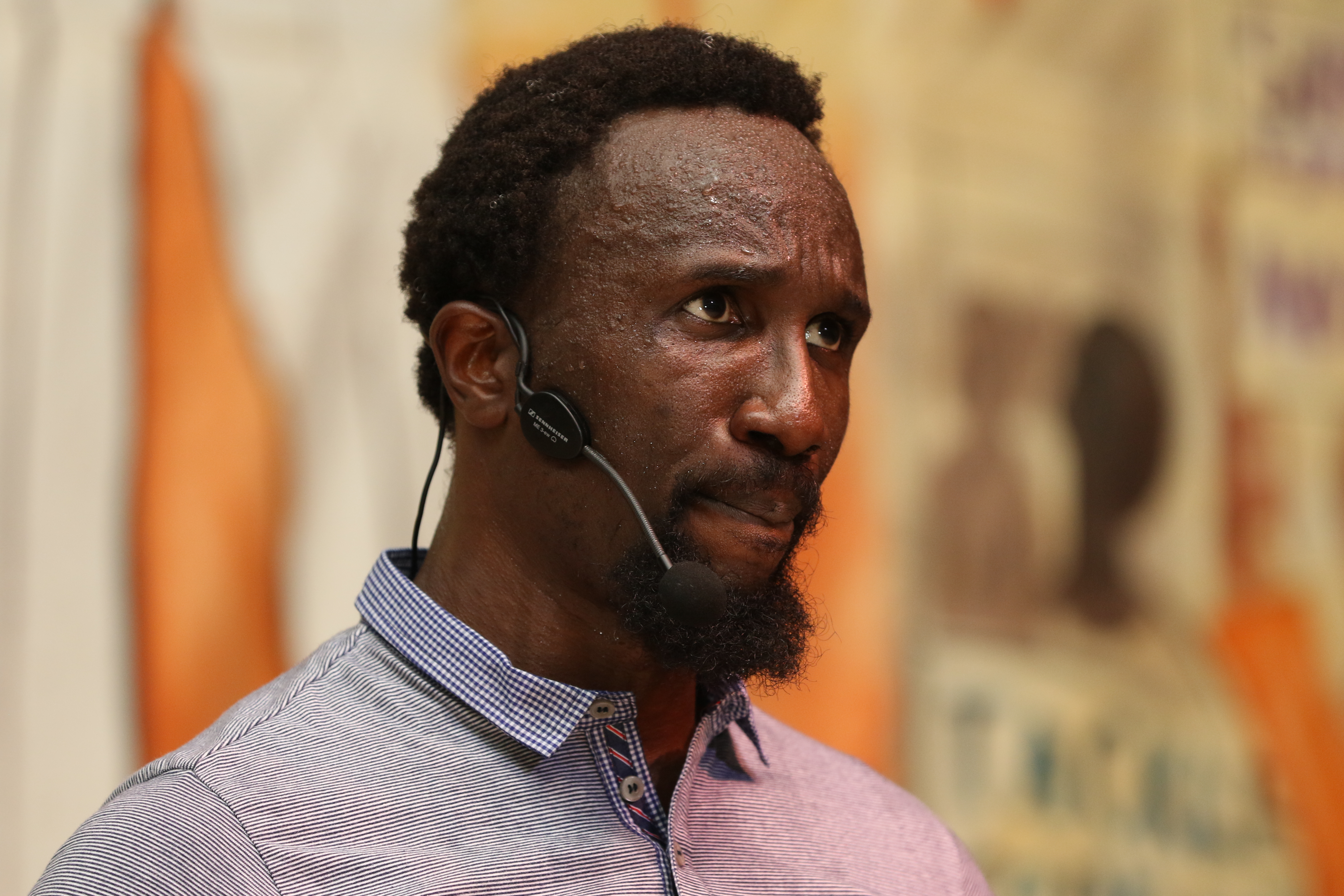
- Chukwumerije in 2016
- Born: Dike-ogu Chukwumerije; Surulere, Lagos, Nigeria
- Education: University of Abuja; SOAS University of London
- Occupations: Author; Performance Poet
- Years active: 2005–present

Dike Chukwumerije is a Nigerian spoken word and performance poetry artist and author. He has eight published books, including the novel Urichindere, which won the 2013 Association of Nigerian Authors (ANA) Prize for Prose Fiction and a poetry theatre production made in Nigeria.

Chukwumerije was cited as one of the Top 100 most influential Africans by magazine New African in 2016.

== Early life ==
Chukwumerije was born in Lagos, Nigeria, and completed his primary and secondary education in the same city before moving north to Abuja. He studied for an LLB Law at the University of Abuja and later obtained a master's degree in Law and Development from SOAS, University of London. His interest in writing and poetry came as a child from his elder brother, poet and musician Che Chukwumerije, and from a childhood friend, Onesi Dominic. He was heavily influenced by his father, Uche Chukwumerije, who published a pan-Africanist magazine, Afriscope, from the 1970s to the early 1980s, and by his mother, Nwoyibo Iweka, a storyteller.

== Career ==
=== Poetry ===
Chukwumerije is a member of the Abuja Literary Society (ALS) and the host of the group's Book Jam and Poetry Slam. He has won several poetry grand slams in Nigeria, including the maiden edition of the African Poet (Nigeria) Grand Slam competition. Since 2013, he has hosted and directed the annual Night of the Spoken Word (NSW) performance poetry event as part of a movement to insert performance poetry into Nigeria's mainstream pop culture. He also hosts weekly Open Mic performances, which include a mix of acts from readings of short stories by their authors to musical performances, poetry, and spoken word acts.

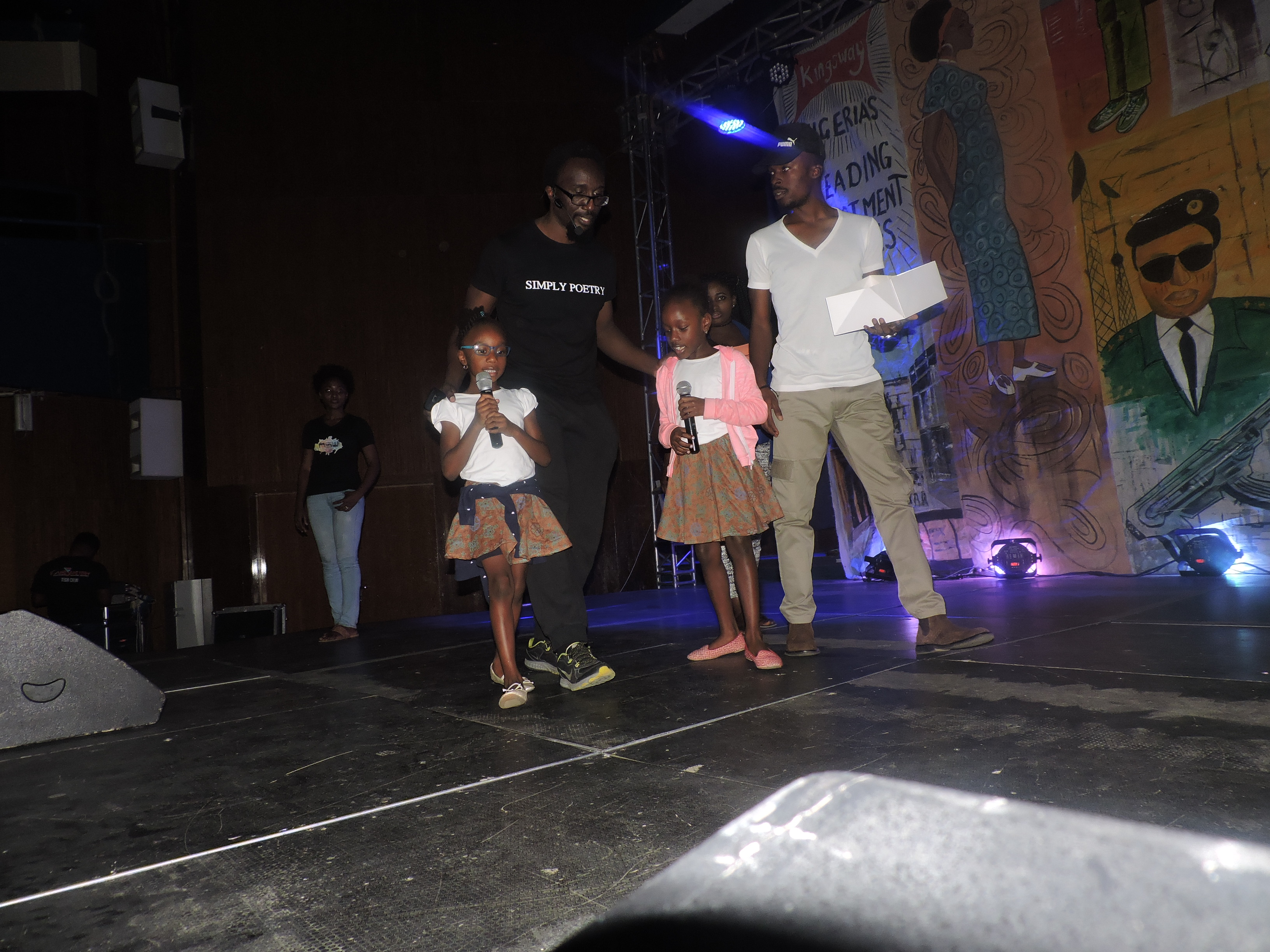
Chukwumerije preparing for a show on February 11, 2017

He has three performance poetry videos, a live poetry show (NSW – Night of the Spoken Word), now in its fifth year, and three theatre productions: The "Made in Nigeria" Poetry Show was shown on stage nine times – in Abuja, Lagos, Enugu, Benin, Bonny, Maiduguri, Yola, Jos, and Ile-Ife – between September 2016 and October 2018. "Let's be honest" and "Man-made gods" had its stage debut on October 1, 2018.

His shows are critically acclaimed.

At TEDx Maitama in September 2017, and at the 23rd Nigeria Economic Summit in October 2017, Chukwumerije's rendition of his poem, "The Wall and The Bridge", attracted widespread public attention to his message of the need for national rebirth and a re-awakening of social consciousness.

At The Platform on May 1, 2018, Nigeria's Vice President Professor Yemi Osinbajo recites Chukwumerije's poem "The revolution has no tribe" during his remarks on how young Nigerians are shaping the future. Osinbajo writes that "Dike Chukwumerije reminds us in his powerful poem the Revolution has no tribe and that our destinies as Nigerians no matter our tribe or religion are inextricably tied together. What affects one affects all. Suffering neither knows tribe nor tongue."

On November 15, 2018, he was a speaker alongside Nobel Laureate Wole Soyinka, at the Fifth Lafarge Africa National Literacy Competition in Lagos to challenge leaders to help improve the literacy rate in Nigeria.

=== Speaker ===
Chukwumerije speaks at workshops for amateur writers.
