= Eve Esin =

Nigerian actress (born 1981)

- Born: Evelyn Esin; 17 October 1981 (age 44); Akwa Ibom State
- Education: University of Calabar
- Occupation: Actress
- Years active: 2008-Present

Eve Esin is a Nigerian actress who won the City People Entertainment Awards for Most Promising Actress in Nigeria in 2015, the AMAA award for Best Actress in a Supporting Role and Best Actress in a drama at the AMVCA.

== Early life and education ==
Esin was born in Akwa Ibom State a south-south geographical area of Nigeria occupied predominantly by the minority tribes in Nigeria. Esin, more precisely is from Oron Local Government Area of Akwa-Ibom. Esin completed her primary school education in her hometown in Akwa Ibom where she obtained her First School Leaving Certificate. Esin after completing her primary school education, proceeded to Immaculate Conception Secondary School Itak-Ikono in Akwa Ibom State where she obtained her West African Senior School Certificate. Esin then proceeded to the University of Calabar in Cross River State where she graduated with a B.Sc. degree in Theatre Arts.

== Career ==
Esin before officially joining the Nigerian movie industry commonly known as Nollywood in 2008 was a banker who would eventually quit her job as a banker to focus on what she described as her true passion which was acting. Esin joined the Nigerian movie industry in 2008 after she participated in a movie audition where she emerged successful and got a call back from the producers to feature in the movie project. Esin made her directorial debut with the movie titled Spirit. According to reputable Nigerian media house The Tribune, Esin has featured in over 100 movies.

== Awards ==
- In 2015, Esin won the City People Entertainment Awards for most Promising Actress in Nigeria in 2015.
- Esin won the AMAA Award for Best Actress in a Supporting Role.
- Esin won the award for Best Actress in a drama at the AMVCA

== Selected filmography ==
- Blue (2019)
- Pains Of Life (2017)
- Girls Are Not Smiling (2017)
- Treasure (2017)
- The Storm (2016)
- Marry Who You Love (2016)
- Oshimiri (2015)
- Idemili (2014)
- Brothers War (2013)
- Brave Mind (2012)
- Deep Water (2012)
- Hand Of Fate (2012)
- Sins Of The Past (2012)
- The Enemy I See (2012)
- Gallant Babes (2011)
- Thanks For Coming (2011)
- Mad Sex (2010)
- Royal War (2010)
- Indecent Desire (2005)

== See also ==
- List of Nigerian actors
