= University of Calabar =

Public university in Calabar, Nigeria

Coordinates: 4.9527°N 8.3406°E

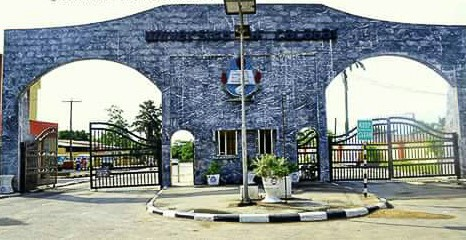
- University of Calabar main gate
- Motto: Knowledge for Service
- Type: Public
- Established: 1975; 51 years ago
- Vice-Chancellor: Professor Offiong Efanga Offiong
- Location: Calabar, Cross River State, Nigeria
- Campus: City
- Nickname: Malabites/Malabresses
- Website: unical.edu.ng

The University of Calabar is a federal university situated in Calabar, Cross River State, Nigeria. It is one of Nigeria's second-generation federal universities. The University of Calabar was a campus of the University of Nigeria until 1975. The present Vice Chancellor is Prof. Offiong Offiong. The post of the DVC (Academics) is held by Professor Anthony Eyang, while Dr. Grace Eno Nta (Professor) is the current DVC (Administration).

The architecture was designed by John Elliott. It was established by decree to fulfill this traditional mandate, its motto "Knowledge for Service".

== University Library ==
The University of Calabar Library is the main academic library of the University of Calabar, located in Calabar, Cross River State, Nigeria. Established in 1975, the library has since grown to become one of the largest and most comprehensive academic libraries in Nigeria, serving as a resource for students, faculty, and researchers.

== Administration and leadership ==
The current principal members of the university administration and their positions are as follows:

Office	Holders
Visitor	President of the Federal Republic of Nigeria Bola Ahmed Tinubu
Chancellor	The former Emir of Kano, Alhaji Aminu Ado Bayero
Pro-Chancellor & Chairman of Council	DIG Udom Ekpoudom (rtd)
Vice-Chancellor	Professor Offiong Efanga Offiong
Deputy Vice-Chancellor (Academics)	Professor Anthony Eyang
Deputy Vice-Chancellor (Administration)	Professor Eno Grace Nta
University Librarian	Professor Aniebiet Inyang Ntui
Registrar	Dr. (Mrs.) Chukwuka Icha
Bursar	Mr. Aniefiok Godwin Williams

== Affiliate institutions ==
This is a list of affiliate institutions of the University of Calabar approved by the National Universities Commission (NUC).

- Nigerian Christian Bible Church (NCBC).
- Reformed Theological Seminary, Mkar (RTSM).
- Catholic Institute of West Africa, Port-Harcourt (CIWAP).
- Essien Ukpabio Presbyterian College Itu, Akwa Ibom State (EUPCIAS).
- College of Education, Katsina-Ala, Benue State (CEKBS).
- Federal College of Education, Obudu, Cross River State (FCEOCR).

== Notable alumni ==
Amongst the alumni of the University of Calabar are:

- Favour Abatang, women's rights advocate
- Reuben Abati, Lawyer/writer.
- Queeneth Agbor, actress
- Biko Agozino, criminologist
- Godswill Akpabio, Senate President of Nigeria
- Anthony Ayine, auditor general for the Federation.
- Regina Askia-Williams, actress -left before graduation
- Isabella Ayuk, MBGN 2012.
- Grace Folashade Bent, politician.
- Omotu Bissong, model/television presenter.
- Stacey B. Day, Ntufam Ajan of Oban
- Chile Eboe-Osuji, International Jurist and Current President of the International Criminal Court, The Hague, Netherlands.
- Dr. Betta Edu, Nigerian public health specialist and politician
- Dr. Ahizechukwu Eke, Nigerian-American, Associate Professor of Maternal-Medicine & Gynecology & Obstetrics, Johns Hopkins University
- Kennedy Ekezie, philosopher, former national debate champion, entrepreneur and CEO of Kippa
- Keppy Ekpenyong, Nigerian actor.
- Alexx Ekubo, actor/model.
- Ita Enang, politician
- Nelson Enwerem, model, television personality and winner of Mr Nigeria 2018
- Eve Esin, Nigerian actress
- Eno Essien, technology entrepreneur
- Aloysius Akpan Etok, politician
- Shiloh Godson, Nigerian composer
- Kate Henshaw, actress
- Okezie Ikpeazu, Former Governor of Abia State of Nigeria.
- Alex Mascot Ikwechegh, politician, businessman and philanthropist
- Stella Immanuel, Doctor and conspiracy theorist based in Houston, Texas.
- Iyanya, singer/songwriter/performer.
- Osita Izunaso, politician
- Uche Jombo, actress
- Benjamin Kalu, politician and member of the House of Representatives
- Yahaya Kuta, Nigerian author
- Victor Ndoma-Egba, politician
- Aniebiet Inyang Ntui, EU Ambassador, University Librarian of University of Calabar and Professor of Library and Information Science.
- Florence Obi, academic, author, professor, and 11th substantive vice-chancellor of University of Calabar
- John Odey, former minister
- Stephanie Okereke, actress.
- Chido Onumah, Nigerian/Canadian journalist, author and activist
- Elizabeth Shoyemi, Executive Director Centre for Population Health Initiatives (CPHI)
- Jewel Taylor, Former first Lady, Senator (2006–2018) and current Vice President of Liberia
- John James Akpan Udo-Edehe, politician
- Dorothy Ufot, lawyer and politician
- Eteng Jonah Williams, Nigerian Senator
- Louiza Williams, film executive
- Owens Wiwa, human rights activist.
- Chukwuemeka Ngozichineke Wogu, minister

== Notable faculty ==
- Eskor Toyo, Professor of Economics and Marxist scholar
- Eno James Ibanga, Professor of Solid State Physics and Materials Science
- Akpan Hogan Ekpo, Professor of Economics and Public Policy

== See also ==
- List of universities in Nigeria
- Education in Nigeria
