= Uche Chukwumerije =

Nigerian politician

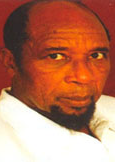

Senator for Abia North
- In office 29 May 2003 – 19 April 2015
- Preceded by: Ike Nwachukwu
- Succeeded by: Mao Ohabunwa

Personal details
- Born: 11 January 1939 Ogoja, Nigeria
- Died: 19 April 2015 (aged 75) Abuja, Nigeria
- Resting place: Ngogo Isuochi, Abia State, Nigeria
- Party: PDP
- Other political affiliations: Socialist Workers and Farmers Party (SWAFP), People's Redemption Party (PRP), Progressive People's Alliance (PPA)
- Spouse: Princess Gloria Nwoyibo Iweka
- Children: Che Chidi, Kwame Ekwueme, Azuka Juachi, Dikeogu Egwuatu, Chaka Ikenna, Uchemruaka Obinna (Uche jnr), Kelechi Udoka, Chikadibia Yagazie
- Parent(s): Sergeant (Sarji) Ogbonna Chukwumerije, Mrs Egejuru Chukwumerije
- Education: University of Ibadan
- Occupation: Politician, publisher, journalist, entrepreneur
- Profession: Economist
- Nickname(s): Comrade, Ishikaraka

Uche Chukwumerije // (11 January 1939 – 19 April 2015), popularly referred to as "Comrade Chukwumerije" because of his lifelong socialist beliefs, was elected a senator of the Federal Republic of Nigeria in April 2003, representing Abia North Senatorial District.

== Early life ==
Chukwumerije was born on 11 January 1939 in Ogoja, in present day Cross River State of Nigeria, to Sergeant Ogbonna Chukwumerije (popularly called Sarji) and his third wife Mrs Egejuru Chukwumerije, both hailing from Isuochi in present day Abia State of Nigeria. He was the 4th of his mother's eight children: Daniel, Roland, Ahamefula (Joe), Ucheruaka, Ifeyinwa, Rosa, Ochi, Onyekozuoro (Onyex).

== Education ==
He attended Methodist Central School, Nkwoagu, Isuochi, Abia State, 1943–52; Our Lady's High School, Onitsha, 1953–57; University College Ibadan, 1958–61, where he majored in Economics; Faith Bible College, Sango-Ota, 1991-92.

== Early career ==
Head Features Desk, DailyTimes, 1961; News Desk, Nigerian Broadcasting Corporation (now FRCN);

== Political career ==
Chukwumerije served as Minister of Information and Culture under General Ibrahim Babangida and under the Interim National Government of Ernest Shonekan.

== Senate ==
In the Fourth Republic, Chukwumerije was elected to the Senate on the Peoples Democratic Party's platform, but he fell out of favor with the party's leadership when he opposed the Third Term Agenda. Chukwumerije eventually decamped to the Progressive Peoples Alliance in 2006, and was reelected to the Senate on April 28, 2007.

Chukwumerije was reelected on the PDP platform in the April 2011 elections. He died in office of lung cancer in 2015.

== Family ==
Chukwumerije was married to Princess Gloria N. Iweka. They had eight children: Che Chidi (1974-), Kwame Ekwueme (1975-1995), Azuka Juachi (1976-), Dikeogu Egwuatu (1979-), Chaka Ikenna (1980-), Uchemruaka Obinna (1982-), and the twins Kelechi Udoka (1983-) and Chikadibia Yagazie (1983-). Chukwumerije and Princess Iweka were divorced in 1988. In 1995,He lost his son Kwame in an auto accident.One of their sons Chika won a bronze medal at the 2008 Olympic Games in Beijing. Another son, Dike, is an acclaimed Nigerian writer, public speaker and performance poet.
