= List of villages in Cross River State =

This is a list of villages and settlements in Cross River State, Nigeria organised by local government area (LGA) and district/area (with postal codes also given).

== By postal code ==
LGA	District / Area	Postal code	Villages
Abi	Agbo	543106	Abba-Omega; Abokolo; Adadama; Agarabe; Akanefore; Akeraja; Akpoha; Among-Ezeke; Ebalabo; Egberonyi; Ekufe Kunta; Ekuruku-Nta; Ekurukube; Ekweiekwu; Eligene; Emina; Eminekpon; Etani; Ezeke-Emege; Iboiebo; Imikuo; Imino; Itigidi; Letoner; Mbaiebe; Mbaleke; Ngaraba
Abi	Ajere	543103	Afoafaha; Ajere-Beach; Akugom; Ekori; Epenti-Beach; Kemaniben; Lekpankom; Ntan; Ofrekpe; Okon-Obonogha
Abi	Ebom	543101	Abegor; Aneja II; Ano-Ikpara; Barbobom; Bikobiko; Egbizum; Emenko; Eno-Evong; Enwetiti; Funaria; Ibenda I; Leboikom; Lekpankom; Lower Igonigoni; Mkpanghi; Ntankpo; Ugep; Upper Ignoigoni; Usumutong; Yenon
Abi	Ediba	543102	Afafanyi; Anona; Ediba; Ensuokwe; Enugwema; Epenti; Ezono; Ofrekpe
Abi	Idomi	543105	Aduma; Agoi Ibomi; Egbezum; Idomi; Ife Agoi; Iyang-Mkpe; Lekpankom; Loseni; Mkpani; Nfakom; Nsobo; Otalosi; Uden-Okota
Abi	Igbo	543107	Assiga-Beach; Assiga-New Town; Assiga-Old-Town; Ekepoli; Ekunkuna; Igbo Waterside; Inyima; Itakono
Abi	Nkpolo	543104	A.D.C. Rubber; Abanankpai; Agoi Ekpo; Agoi-Ekpo; Ekamasai; Ekom Agoi; Elige; Ephoho; Lebong; Lokpoi; Mbono I - III; Mpeni; Nko; Nko Rubber Estate; Okomasi; Okurika
Akamkpa	Egup-Ipa	542109	Abamba; Abaribara; Abini Ajijia; Abrikang; Adim Edodono; Adim Obioko; Agwaguna Egbe; Agwaguna Emo; Ahapai Adom; Ahapia; Akofbenyim; Akparavuni; Akpet Central; Akpet I; Akugom; Aradang; Asetoimo; Asoke; Ayimo; Edodiesu; Edodone Aboni; Egip Urom; Ekoho; Epefime; Esuikongo; Etabi; Ibenabang I; Ibenabang II; Igbadara; Ijom Abayong; Imasetbi; Ina Missingo; Itu Agwagune; Okurike; Ugbem; Ukwop-Uyiere; Umari; Unoikengo
Akamkpa	Ehom	542107	Ehom; Ehom Central; Ekpri; Etono I; Idoma; Iko; Iwuru Obio; Ntan
Akamkpa	Erei	542112	Abanwam; Afono; Edu; Egbor; Etana; Ibini; Ipene; Obani Erei; Umoubon; Urugban
Akamkpa	Iko Ekpe-Rem	542105	Ekpri Iko; Ibum; Iko Ekperem; Iko Esai; Itokem; Mbenentung; New Ekuri; Obutang; Obutong; Old Ekuri; Owai
Akamkpa	Ikpai	542106	Abatai; Akor; Ekang; Ikpai; Kwa Falls-Aningeje; Mamenyong; Mbeban; Mkpot; Mtabachot; New Ndebeji; Nkame; Ojok; Old Ndebeji; Orem; Owon
Akamkpa	Netin	542101	Akamkpa; Awi; Ibonda; Isong Inyang; Mbarantung; Njagachang; Nsan; Nyaabam; Okom Ita; Old Netim; Onun Mbarakom
Akamkpa	North West (Ito)	542110	Akani Obio I; Asang; Atan Eki; Atan Idere; Atan Onoyom; Ekim Ito; Ekpene Ibiabong-Eki; Enen Ito; Esuk Stan; Ewen; Ibiakpan; Iboho Ito; Idim Atan; Idim Nom Eku; Ikot Eduong; Ikot Offiong Asang; Ikpabio Ito; Isahi; Ito; Mbiabong; Mbiabong Ito; Nipani; Ntan Obu Ukpo Obio; Obiom; Obodio Eno Eki; Obodo Eki; Obot Akpatio; Obot Esu Ito; Obot Udana; Obukwo Esa; Obukwomuno; Odioho Ito; Odot Idere; Okpo; Okube; Ono Ito; Ubem Okon Abia; Ubia Obi o; Ubia Obio II; Ufot Itiat; Ukwa-Mbiwa; Usang Ikpa; Usiere; Utambara Ito
Akamkpa	Oban	542102	Abong; Aking; Ekong; Elae Itokem; Mangor; Mbenentung; Ndip Eranim; Okarara; Osomba
Akamkpa	Ojuk	542103	Abiati; Aningeje; Ekonganaku; Mbobui; Mfamosing; Ndingane; Oberekai; Okoroba
Akamkpa	Ubang-Hara	542111	Anogbanesu Ikun; Ejoro Okpor; Emokin; Emot Okpar; Emot Okpor; Enidit; Enodakoton; Enougo; Enougo-Ewuruon; Eriget; Etono II; Eweruon; Ewothpo-Ikun; Iboku-Ikun; Igana-Ikun; Igenigba Deogbe; Imieapo; Izu Egwe; Obun-Ikun; Okonta; Okpo; Onba Ikun; Onoronwanza; Oriti Ugom; Owon-Aradun; Ugburugbu; Urambok; Uyor Eyai
Akamkpa	Umon	542108	Abana; Akpasip; Aniyem; Ayaba Oji; Bechei; Berekpe; Biekpe; Bikekpe; Ekot Ewo; Idung Itu; Ikot Abasi;Ikot Ana; Ikot Obisame; Ikot Oboaama; Ikot Ogbandem; Ikot Ogun; Ikot Okpora; Ikot Utun; Inu-ranu; Utumua
Akamkpa	Uyanga	542104	Akwa Ibami; Ekei Ibemi; Ekpri Iwuru; Ewen; Ifumkpa; Igboria; Ikami; Joseph Oyak; Mbarakpa; Ojor Nkonimba; Uwet; Uyanga; Uyanga Abakpa
Bakassi	Atimbo (East)	541104	Anwa Enang-Edem; Asibang; Atimbo; Edem; Edik Ekpen Eyo; Efanga; Efiom; Ekpeme Ikot Ekpse; Ekpeme Ikot Umo; Ekpene Tete; Ekpri Ikot; Ifondo; Ikot; Ikot Abasi-Archibong; Ikot Anasa Edet; Ikot Asuquo-Edem; Ikot Asuquo-Ukut; Ikot Edem-Ndarake; Ikot Efefiong; Ikot Efio Ayarare; Ikot Efio Enang; Ikot Ekanaem-Nya; Ikot Ekpo Ene; Ikot Ekpri; Ikot Ewa Effiom; Ikot Eyo Abia; Ikot Offiong-Ambai; Ikot Ofiong Owo; Ikot Uba
Bakassi	Atimbo (West)	541103	Atim Asan; Duke; Edem; Edet Nsa; Effiong; Esit Ikot Inameti; Esit Ikot-Effanga; Ete Oyo; Eto Mkpa-Archigong; Eto Mkpe Yellow; Eto Mkpe-Edem; Etok Ukana Ikot-Efanga; Iko Ekpo-Ase; Ikot Akwa-Umo; Ikot Efio Okon; Ikot Efiong; Ikot Mkpe Efiom; Ikot Ndarake; Ikot Okon Eniang; Ikot Okpo Ene; Ikot Oyom; Itu Ikot-Efanga; Mbanyok Ikot-Efanga; Mong; Okon Etim; Oton Kwo; Urua Ndung-Ikot-Efanga
Bakassi	Iboku	541106	Abayama; Ada Iba; Adana Mbaibo; Adiabo Akani Obio; Adun Mbiabo; Afaha; Akani Obio Ukem; Akpatrefe; Akwa Efe; Akwa Iyoke; Akwa Obio Inwang; Atan Oku; Ebe Akpo; Edik Iko; Edit Iko Ekpo-; Edit Ikpa Eman; Efuk Ifako; Ekong Atan Oku; Ekot Antigha Udo; Ekot Efiok Eyo; Ekpenyang Eyo; Ekpenyong; Ekpri Iyoki; Ekwa Iyoke; Eseku; Esku Ikot Itam; Esuk Akwa Obio; Esuk Obot Inyang; Etak Okono; Ibonda Town; Ibumo; Ifako; Ikiot Offiong Ebe; Ikot Ikang; Ikot Abasi Eyo; Ikot Antigha Ado; Ikot Asako; Ikot Asido Otu; Ikot Aye Eyo; Ikot Efa; Ikot Effiong Otop; Ikot Efiok Eyo; Ikot Efiok-Ekpenyong; Ikot Ekong; Ikot Enembe; Ikot Eneokon; Ikot Eno; Ikot Essien; Ikot Esu; Ikot Etim; Ikot Ewa Otu; Ikot Eyo; Ikot Eyo Abasi Itam; Ikot Eyo Okon; Ikot Ibok Eyo; Ikot Mesembe; Ikot Mfuho; Ikot Mkpanam (Akpane); Ikot Mkpang; Ikot Nameti Otu; Ikot Ntung; Ikot Obongeno; Ikot Okon Akabom; Ikot Otudor; Ikot Udo; Ikot Ukpa; Ikpet; Inua Akpa; Inwang; Iso Inyang Ikpa; Isong Inyang; Isong Inyang Ene; Isong Inyang Eyo; Isong Inyang Ufak; Isong Inyang-Akpamfrukin; Isong Inynag; Mbambori Ikot Ma; Mbarakom; Mbiabo; Mbiabo Ikoneto; Mbombori; Ndom Itu; Ndom Nyam; Nkitto/Obot Okpo; Nsa; Nta Ikot Offiong Ede; Nta Obo; Nyom Idibi; Obot Akpang; Obot Etubom; Obot Eyho; Obot Eyo; Obot Idim Nyoyok; Obot Inyang; Obot Iyang; Obot Oko; Obot Udo; Obot Urua; Obot Urua Mbiabo; Obufa Obio Ukem; Ofong Okurusa; OKOY-; Okpo Ikpa; Okuruikang; ONG 541107; Osak; Ovufa Obio Ukan; Ukem Okoyong-Ekenge; Usang Abani; Usun Akin Akim; Usung Obot; Uyin Ekon
Bakassi	Ikang North	541113	Abakpa Efio Ase; Abakpa Ikot-Nkok; Akpap Okon-Ekpriwong; Anie; Edik Okon Idem; Esuk Okon; Esuke Aye; Ifiong Nsung; Ikot Edem Oku; Ikot Eso Odiong Ene; Ikot Iwang Okpo; Ikot Otu; Ofiong Edem Inyang; Osuk Okon; Usung Esuk-Efio-Obori
Bakassi	Ikang South	541115	AkwaObio Inwang Nsidung; Efute Abua Esighi; Ekpene Esuk Esighi; Esit Ikot Nsa Ewa; Idua Inwang Esighi; Ikot Abasi Ene-Esighi; Ikot Antigha Ene; Ikot Ene Uyi Esighi; Ikot Enene Esighi; Ikot Ikot Antighi; Ikot Inyang Nsidung; Ikot Mkpang Esighi; Nyom Idibi Nsidung; Okukubarakpa-Esighi; Usung Idim Ikot-Antigho
Bakassi	Ikangu Central	541114	Akwa Obutong; Edik Idim Ikot; Ekpri Ikang; Ikang Efio Ekpe; Ikang Town; Ine Akpa Ikang; Ine Effiong; Ine Ibot Owong; Ine Ikong Efanga; Ine Nkene Okure I; Ine Nkene Okure II; Ine Nkoi; Ine Ukpono; Ine Utan; Ine Utan Asukwo
Bakassi	Ikot Edem Odo	541105	Akwa Esuk Iyamba; Archibong; Ekakat Iyamba; Ekpene Ikot Edet-Nsa; Ekpene Ikot-Okon; Ekpri Ikot Ene; Ekpri Ikot Umo; Ekpri Nsidung; Enang; Esiene Ufot-Iyanba; Esuk Mba; Esuk Mbat Efio-Edem Efa; Esuk Mbat Umo Edem; Esuk Mbat-Efio Urua; Iboku/Esit/Edik; Idem; Ikot Akpa; Ikot Edem Odo; Ikot Edet; Ikot Efion Eniang; Ikot Ekong; Ikot Ekpo; Ikot Ekpo Udo; Ikot Obo; Ikot Oboko; Ikot Okan Okpo; Ikot Okodiong; Ikot Onono Iba; Ikot Oyo; Ikut Nkok Anie; Nkakat Efiong Essien; Nsa; Usung Idim
Bakassi	Ikot Naka-Nda	541111	Abakot Eneyo; Abakpa Etim Ene; Akwa Obio-Inwang-Eneyo; Duke; Ebisa Eneyo; Edem Esa Abakot; Efe Efik Imaha; Ekpo; Ekpri Ikot Eyo-Edem; Esuk Efiom Ikara; Esuk Ewa; Ikot Adiaha Eneyo; Ikot Asuquo-Efiong-Anye; Ikot Edem Ita; Ikot Efiong Etta; Ikot Ekpe; Ikot Etim Inyang; Ikot Inynag Eneyo; Ikot Man Du Eneyo; Ikot Mbakara Eneyo; Ikot Out Abasi; Ikot Uduak Edem; Ikot Umo Edem
Bakassi	Ikot Nakawda (North)	541112	Akwa Ikot Eyo Edem; Ekpene Efion Eyo; Esine Ufot Ikot-Edet Nsa; Esit Ikot; Esit Ikot Ede Nsa; Idebe Ikot Essen; Idebe Ikot Essien; Idebe Offiong-Umo; Ikot Akpandem; Ikot Anasua; Ikot Asikpo; Ikot Edem Mtifot; Ikot Efio Enang; Ikot Ekpo Essien; Ikot Ene Edet; Ikot Mbang; Ikot Mkpa; Ikot Nakan de; Ikot Nkese; Ikot Nya Nya; Ikot Okon Mma; Ikot Okor-Ekpenyong; Ikot Otu Namuso; Okon Idem; Okoro Oyo Ita
Bakassi	New Netim	541109	New Etim
Bakassi	Odot Edion	541110	Adua; Akpa Ita; Akwa Ekim; Akwa Ikot; Anwa Ibok; Atan Odot; Edem Adua; Efedem; Ekime Mfuk; Ekimi Ebebit; Esit Ikot; Esuk Edem; Esuk Odot; Ndon Nwong; Obio Asim; Obot Inwang; Obot Nunuene; Obot Obio; Obot Obot Eyanba; Odot Uyi; Ottong Ediong; Usung Odot
Bakassi	Odukpani (East)	541102	Archibong; Asabanka; Efeta; Enyanghanse; Esin Ufot I; Esin Ufot II; Etantan; Idundu; Ikot Archibong; Ikot Okon; Ikpa; Orok Epong
Bakassi	Odukpani (West)	541101	Abiakom; Adiabo Ikot-Otu; Akani Obio-Akim; Akim Akim; Akpong; Anyanghanse; Ediki Okon-Eta; Esuk Adim; Esuk Itiat; Esuk Mbat; Etaa Kpini; Etim Edet; Ibuot; Ikot Agbor; Ikot Ansa Ekpo; Ikot Ayom; Ikot Mesembe; Ikot Offiong; Ikot Okon-Archibong; Ikot Okpo-Umoh; Ikot William-George; Mbat Odukpani; Obot Oyoh; Odukpani Dua; Okong Nte-Okong; Usung Ayom
Bakassi	Okoyong (South)	541108	Akapa Uwet; Akpap Okoyong; Asiaha Obufa Usang; Budeng; Efe Ene; Esine Ufot; Esuk Ekom; Iko; Kaifa; Ndoduo; Nta Inwang; Oboroko; Obot Inyang; Oton Hotoho; Ubanbat; Unyin Akamkpa; Usung Esuk; Usung Idim Usung; Usung Ikoneto; Usung Ura; Utan Okpo
Bekwarra	Abuochiche	550102	Abube Ukpa; Abuochiche; Agage; Agbagbuna; Akwurinyi; Anyikang; Bekwara; Ebegang-Irihunguchu; Echegang; Etekpa; Eyoediomu-Ijibor-Irihunguchu; Ibiragndi; Ijibor; Ijibor Agana; Ijibor-Ojiji; Ijibor-Oloko; Ikparikobo; Nyanya Ohum; Nyaya Idigwe; Obuachi; Ubekpa; Ububu; Ugboro; Ukpa; Ukpada; Ukpahribo; Ukpat; Unwagba Ukpa; Unwapu; Unwapu Ukpa; Utube Iye; Utukwe; Utukwe-Iye
Bekwarra	Afrike	550103	England Afrike; Ochagbe; Okpaech
Bekwarra	Eastern Yala	550107	Abacho Ogugo; Akraha; Echiakpu; Echumofara; Echumogana-Ofiekpa; Edimoga; Ekprinyin; Ibi; Igbekuriko; Ijegu; Ijegu Ogogo; Ijegu Ore; Ijegu Wobu; Ijguonyi; Imaje; Ipude Okuku; Oganiko; Ojebu Oke; Okuku; Okukujin; Oloko; Ugaga; Woda; Yaa
Bekwarra	Ekajuk	550109	Abaraku; Abealirin; Abuntak Nwang; Adop; Ajohjah; Akogbe; Akunaye; Ashuk; Asika; Atambong; Atanghol; Atuntak; Awinghi; Bansara-Abakpo-Ntara; Ebinde; Edep; Efut Nsei; Egbong; Eguoh; Eja; Ekagong; Ekpeherongho; Ekpojokown; Ekpokre; Ekuaro; Emandak; Emandok; Emekpo; Enagendak; Enyi; Eyimi; Eyombon; Kaduda; Kpambpa; Kpautra; Leper; Mabuna Fram; Mafung; Mbok; Mfom; Mfom II; Mkpakua; Mojebekabe; Motel; Ndar; Ndubi; Nfanangbe; Ngiti; Ngon; Ngulia; Njokima; Nkamero; Nkpangi; Nnang-Elesi; Nsinjon; Ntak Ekon; Ntara I; Ntara II; Ntara III; Ntara-Ayimaya; Ntingigna; Ntunnop; Nwang; Nyake; Settlement; Ukpagatale; West Nwang
Bekwarra	Gabu	550112	Abioghole; Adikpe Yole; Ega; Gabu; Itekpa; Ogbohi; Opipua; Otukpa; Otunkpa
Bekwarra	Gakem	550108	Akaraba; Akpakpa; Atuana; Ayandie; Betin; Bewo; Gakem; Otukporo; Utugbo
Bekwarra	Mbube	550104	Abi-Irruan; Abuekpu; Adayom; Akatem; Aragbam; Asaba I; Asaba II; Bansan-Mapan-Atam; Bansara; Binkpe; Edede; Ediba; Egbe Mpi-Iman; Egung; Ekeja; Ekum Tak; Idum; Iloko; Irribekem-Efintak; Jeriko; Kadama; Lagos; London; Mkpar; Mpam-Bentam; Mpambeka; Mpan Ewenken; Mpan-Agabo; Mpan-Amung; Mpan-Bikuel; Mpanbikuel; Mpangbenyi; Mtom; Njukwe; Nkim; Oboso; Ochogbe; Odojie; Ogberia-Ochoro; Ogeria-Ogong; Ojerim; Okumba; Onicha; Orin-Ekpang; Umaji; Zaria
Bekwarra	Nkum	550105	Aburumbede; Akpahata; Aladin; Edogo; Eshehge; Ibil; Ikandang; Ikpride; Ikum; Ishindede; Mbenkpin; Mfonju; Mokom; Nkpute Bagidi; Ukpagada; Ukpe
Bekwarra	North Ukele	550111	Aboko; Adomogbe; Agbo; Ajine Adum; Anyogbe; Ayioba-Wankinde; Bikele-Obantagama; Bitol; Ekom; Elakin; Ibenta; Ichojil I; Ichojil II; Igbakobu; Igbeji; Igede; Ika Like; Ikpokpo; Imo; Ishony; Latin; Mgbege; Ngidi Adum; Ogangang; Ogoagam; Ojonyor Esoka; Okon Ogbodo; Okponga; Okpotogom; Olemat; Omoji; Oogbaja Ibom 8a; Opriku; Uhakilu; Ujenyi; Ujokom; Ukinde; Ukolobia; Wamakpe; Wamubu; Wanadon; Wanagina; Wanakandi; Wanakpon; Wanikade; Wanjer Elhen; Wanukande
Bekwarra	Ogoja Urban	550101	Aminica; Igoli; Ishibori; Leper Settlement; Monaya; Ndok; Njaria; Ogboja; Ogoja; Okendi; Okuku
Bekwarra	South Ukele	550110	Adums; Benkaba; Bituol; Bitutum; Ezekwe; Idum; Ijigbeji; Ijobolor Odaraka; Ijokom; Ijrogar II; Ikemoho; Imate; Indiegonu; Ipollo; Itigidi; Mbora; Mfum; Mfum Odom; Ndubia; Ndunwankpu; Ngomo; Njimaya; Ntrigom; Ogba; Ogomogoma; Okpodom; Okpodom I; Okpodom II; Okponi; Okumenyi; Olosi; Oshuel; Ujissi-Ekagwu; Ujm; Ukpaka; Wanbiha; Wonudu
Bekwarra	Western Yala	550106	Abakpa; Abanike; Abatchor; Abiogbole; Achiodoba; Achuoku; Adeni; Adikpe Yohe; Agomeko; Alifokpa; Alonge; Ayokpa; Baraki; Ebaruma; Ebo; Ebor; Echimbong; Ega; Etandare; Gabu; Iboko; Idiku; Igo; Ijegu; Ijema; Inia; Ipuele; Itega; Itega Okpodu; Itege; Itekpa; Jie; Mbuo; Mouye; Oba Okpoma; Ochocho; Ochouge; Ogboli; Okpoma; Okpudu; Olatchor; Opipu; Osina; Ougumaji; Owoleyeche; Uche; Udenyuwa; Ukpauku; Utagba; Utukpa; Utukpo; Wanye; Yahe
Bekwarra	Yache	550113	Abakpa; Abanike; Achiodoba; Achuoku; Alifokpa; Alonye; Ayuokpa; Ebaruma; Echimbogu; Etandare; Igo; Ijegu; Inia; Ipuele; Jie; Mbuo; Mouye; Ochouge; Osina; Uche; Utagba; Wanye
Boki	Abawyum	551110	Abankang; Abinti; Akorofono; Akumabal; Alok; Baggo; Bassange; Begga; Edor; Eleneber; Emangbe; Etikpe; Kundere I; Kundere II; Manden; Mkim; Nkarasi II; Nkatasi I; Nketa; Nkum; Nlui; Noutap; Ogomogoim; Uyrenkper
Boki	Akpara-Bong	551105	Akorahi; Balep Balep; Balep Opu; Begiaba; Begiatte; Bendeghe Afi; Bendigie; Egbahente; Kakwalalka; Ketting; Lishikwel; Mkpanje; Nkana Cha; Ntuso Okin; Omale; Segiatsu
Boki	Boje	551106	Abo Bonable; Abo Ebanm; Abo Eme; Abo Nkpang; Abo Obisu; Abo Ogbagbante; Abo Takon; Abonorok; Ashikpe; Bansan; Bashua-Biakwen; Bashua-Efore; Bayatung; Bayobri; Boje; Buanchor; Damere; Igel; Ikang; Isobendeghe; Kagbang; Kangyang I; Kangyang II; Karu; Katabong; Kigbor; Nsadop; Orimekpan I; Orimekpan II; Owong
Boki	Eastern Boki	551107	Ashishie; Bakum; Bamba; Bateriko; Beebo; Botatong; Bulkalum; Bumaji; Ofambe; Okiro; Okurison; Okwa ukwanda, Okwa ukwonde; Okwabang; Okwango; Ubong-Atenkwu; Wula
Boki	Ikom (Rural)	551101	Abonkibi; Adijinkpor I; Adijinkpor II; Ariekpe; Asenasen; Bebuagam; Bebuyobang; Benuwhuan; Bishogbo; Bokomo; Etayip; Isabong; Iwumikwu; Little-Agokum; Mgbagabiti; Okwei-Obudu; Old Ikom Town; Ukambi
Boki	Nde	551104	Abayongo; Anagha; Bayabo; Bayalele; Bayano; Bayapere; Bayasung; Bayatugun; Bayaya; Begero; Bika; Bintabe; Buchan-Etebong; Buchan-Unya; Etakor; Etama Nwana; Ijua; Irie; Irriagu; Kabun; Kaku; Kalang; Killie; Mbon Nkpon; Nkumentan; Nkwande; Ofanfun; Rukeri; Saw Kwala; Udeshi; Unyanjos
Boki	Northern Etung	551102	Abia; Abonita; Agbokim Obi; Beabuagbong; Bebuabie; Bebuatauan; Bedia; Begiaba; Bendeghe Ekim; Betukwai; Effraya; Ekimaya; Ekuhaiai; Ibong; Igwe; Kakum; Kukorshie; Kutiang; Mbume; Ohong; Ubong-Better
Boki	NTA	551109	Ababene Ngo; Abayongho; Abebene Nta; Abenatek; Abinti; Adumatam; Alesi; Egbaja; Egbanga; Ejor; Enyi Nte; Enyi-Evertop; Ezere; Inijigo; Memberokpa; Mgbonege; Ngidi; Ngo; Nirigom Nta; Njemetop; Nkapaya; Nkrira; Nkuambong; Nkurofa; Ntatin; Nto; Odo-Nta; Ofafuk Nta; Ofofadim Nta; Ofokpan; Ofonkpan Oyenche; Ofonokpan Ejebajor; Ofonokpan-Egenga; Oikokoma Nta; Okorogang; Okorotung; Okpodom; Olakidung; Otafuk-Nselle; Otighidi-Uselle; Oyenghe; Oyenghe Agong; Ukpada; Ukpringi; Utubia
Boki	Ofutop	551108	Abargba; Abuasu; Amukwong/Alara; Biwhe-Echua; Ebulkunda; Ekpokpa; Ndim; Nkpura; Okangha-Njimowan; Okanghe-Mkpensi; Okosora; Ukordam
Boki	Osokom	551111	Abedebede; Agba; Ajirija; Amandakureke; Arongba; Bansan; Bawop I; Bawop II; Beleege; Belegtte; Borum; Dishighua; Eban; Egbugbe; Etimitim; Iundara; Kotele; Nfom; Njua-Bano; Njua-Kaku; Nkim; Ntamante; Ogep; Oku Aro; Oku Bushuyo; Old Ikwete Ranch; Oundi; Ugbakoko
Boki	Southern Etung	551103	Abijang; Ablesang; Agbotai; Akan; Amunga; Bayaga; Bayaluga; Bayayan; Bebushayan; Beesbong; Biakuanu; Bukumaya; Busanfuna; Buya; Ekuri; Etara; Lishche; Nsofang; Okoraba; Okumi; Otuhu; Shikpacha; Ugene
Obubra	Iyalla	551115	Alagha; Echingro; Iyalla Esaji; Iyalla-Nkum-Akpambe; Iyalla-Ogrude; Njem; Ukpochi
Obubra	Obubra Urban	551112	Abiakom; Akim Akim; Ijakoruk; Imavana Ochoku; Itapibet; Obubra Urban; Ogaga I; Ogaga II; Owakande I & II
Obubra	Ofat (Adum)	551117	Abadene; Arobom; Ebo; Iko; Oderega; Ofat; Okorikpana; Omon; Onyadama; Ovukwa
Obubra	Ofodua (Adum)	551118	Ahaha; Apiapum; Iyamoyona; Obubem; Ofatura; Ofodua; Ofodua Waterside; Onyekpenden; Ovonom
Obubra	Ofombo-Ngha	551114	Agada II; Arama; Ighomatore; Imabana Itamtet; Imebama Ochoku; Obokpa; Obubra; Odum; Ofomokpan; Ofonekan; Ofonkpan; Ogada; Ogana; Okoi; Okokoma; Okpangut; Oraragha; Osakan; Osini; Osobo; Owakande; Owongha; Oyina
Obubra	Okom	551116	Ababene; Akan-Agbawono; Arobom; Ebo; Iko; Isabang; Iyamitet; Ochon; Oderega; Odondon; Odonget; Ofat; Oganbang; Ohama; Okokoro-Otrekpe; Okorikpana; Okumoritet; Omon; Onyadam; Onyen-Okpan; Ovukwa; Oynen-Orangha
Obubra	Osopong	551113	Afia-Oji; Appiapum; Ebiem; Echara Ikwo; Echara-Osopong; Eja; Enibichiri-Osopang; Enyadologor; Enyadolozundechi; Idoro I & II; Igbo; Ijege-Orangha; Ijutum; Isobo Bikobiko; Isobo Otaka; Ndechi; Odagrida; Ofenekom; Ofia-Oji; Ofomana; Ofongamaa; Ogamana I & II; Ogurude; Ohene Eddah; Okimongha; Okpechi; Okpuitumo; Okurike; Omene; Otutu; Owakande Ekpe; Tet; Ugrupon
Obudu	Alege	552018	Abuasu; Amukwong/Alara; Biwhe-Echua; Ukordam
Obudu	Becheve	552111	Amandakureke; Belegette; Belenge; Kotele; Lundara; Old Ikete Ranch; Ugbakoko
Obudu	Bettee	552102	Akoreshie; Beabuagbong; Bebuabie; Bebuatsuan; Bedia; Begiaba; Betukwel; Ibong; Igwo; Kakum; Kutiang; Ohong; Ubong-Better
Obudu	North Oban-Liku	552103	Ablesang; Amunga; Bayaga; Bayatuga; Bayayan; Bebushayan; Beegbong; Blukonu; Bugene; Bukumaya; Busanfung; Buya; Lishiche; Shikpeche; Utuhu
Obudu	Obudu (Rural)	552101	Abonkib; Atiekpe; Bebuagam; Bebuyobang; Benuwhuan; Iwumikwu; Okwei-Obudu; Ukambi
Obudu	Okpe	552105	Akorahi; Begiaba; Begiatsu; Begiatte; Bendi; Bendigie; Kakwalaike; Ketting; Lishikwel; Okpe; Omale
Obudu	South Oban-Liku	552104	Bayabo; Bayalele; Bayama; Bayano; Bayapere; Bayasung; Bayatugun; Begere; Bika; Bintebe; Buchan-Unya; Etesong; Ijua; Irie; Irriagu; Kabun; Kaku; Kalane; Killie; Ruberi; Saw Kwala; Udeshi
Obudu	Ugang	552107	Ofambe; Okiro; Okurison
Obudu	Unpe	552106	Ashikpe; Bayatung; Bayobri; Igel; Ikang; Kagbang; Karu; Kigbor; Owong
Obudu	Utanga	552110	Baggo; Bassange; Begga; Kundeve I; Kundeve II
Obudu	Utugwang	552109	Mgbonege; Nkrira; Okorogang; Okorotung; Ukpada; Ukpringi; Ukutia

== By electoral ward ==
Below is a list of polling units, including villages and schools, organised by electoral ward.

LGA	Ward	Polling Unit Name
Abi	Adadama	Adadama Play Ground; Ivone Play Ground; Ekpon Market Square; Imina Play Ground; Ibalebo Play Ground; Isong Inyang Play Ground; Eminkwe Play Ground; Ekpon Town Hall
Abi	Afafanyi/Igonigoni	Afafanyi Primary School; Akpoza Play Ground; Ezomezom Play Ground; Bazohure Playground; Abe Uyo Play Ground; Abe Okum Play Ground; Abe Enyi Uso Play Ground; Health Centre, Igonigoni
Abi	Ebom/Ebijakara	Funavai Play Ground; Bawetiti Play Ground; Abegor Town Hall; Anoikpte Playground; Rehumomet Play Ground; Health Centre; Banobon Town Hall; Abe Awari; Egbezum Play Ground; Baromi Town Hall; Ebom Primary School
Abi	Ediba	Near Mrs. Bassey Out's Comp; Near Ubi Uka's Compound; Enobom Play Ground; Enugwehuma Playground; Near Elder Ukpabi's Compound; Usa Play Ground Enusokwe; Enugwehuma Play Ground; Obot Uyo Town Hall; Near Chief Uyo's Compound; Eninom Play Ground; Eninom Town Hall; Near Upo's Compound, Waterside; Ezono Play Ground; Akpan Town Hall; Abena Play Ground
Abi	Ekureku I	St. Vincent Primary School Anong; Likpo Town Hall; Anong Letafor Play Ground; Primary School Ekureku; Akpohe Play Ground; Ezeke Play Ground; Akpanku Play Ground; Ekureku Market Square; Akarefor Play Ground; Anong Town Hall; Likpo Waterside Town Hall
Abi	Ekureku II	Ngarabe Play Ground; Primary School, Agbara; Primary School Itiegeve; Government Primary School, Egboronyi; Pcn Eminekpon; Ngarabe Townhall; Agbara Play Ground
Abi	Imabana I	Postal Agency; Opposite Market Square; Primary School I Imabana; Health Centre, Amotomozi; Akpanku Play Ground; Near Agbor, Agbor's Compound Kekoi; Near Edoghi Itobo's House Echekwu; Ba Azogor Play Ground; Ba Emenyi Play Ground; Secondary School, Ezomezom; Igbor Play Ground
Abi	Imabana II	Ba Amo Play Ground; Ba Ikake Play Ground; Ba Egbeng Town Hall; Lehangha Primary School; Ikpalegwa Play Ground; Ikpalegwa Primary School; Ebor Play Ground
Abi	Itigidi	Levachie Town Hall; Community Primary School; Lekpachiel Play Ground; Opposite T N/09; Ikamine Play Ground; Tn/11/N/S; Agba Motor Park; Agba Play Ground; Primary School, Eminebol; Near Elder Asibong Compound
Abi	Usumutong	Abe Ugo Play Ground; Ebokwo Play Ground; Egbezu Play Ground; Abe Ominmini Play Ground; Enoishori Town Hall; Enoishori Play Ground; Enokpore Play Ground; Enoikporotum Play Ground; Enoidom Play Ground; Ekpokan Play Ground; Primary School Usumutong
Akamkpa	Akamkpa Urban	St. John's Primary School; Army Primary School; Government Secondary School; Isong Inyang Play Ground; Base Camp G/House; Mfom Ajoyi Playground; Njohobika Play Ground; Okomita Play Ground; St. Theresa's School; Primary School, Old Netim; Island Village Square; Okomita Village Square; Oso Agui Play Ground; Old Netim Play Ground; Fed. Housing Estate; Bus Stop, Isong Inyang
Akamkpa	Awi	Primary School, Nsan; Health Centre, Nsan; Playground, Mbarakpa; Primary School, Obung I; Primary School, Obung II; Primary School, Awi; Primary School, Etoikumi; C. O. E. Garrage; Town Hall, Awi; Health Centre Ayaebam; Rcc Garage
Akamkpa	Eku	Primary School, Aking; Playground, Osomba; Ayip Eku Playground; Ayip Eku Estate; Primary School, Okarara; Playground New Ndebiji; Primary School, Abung; Primary School, Akor I; Primary School, Akor II
Akamkpa	Iko	Townhall, Okombi; Primary School, Iko Ekperem; Primary School, Iko Esai. I; Primary School, Iko Esai. II; Primary School, Iko Esai. III; Playground, Owai; Playground, New Ekuri; Primary School, New Ekuri; Primary School, Old Ekuri; Village Square, Old Ekuri; Eyeyeng, Playground
Akamkpa	Ikpai	Primary School, Orem; Playground, Ntebachot; Primary School, Mkpot I; Primary School, Mkpot II; Playground, Iku; Primary School, Nyaje I; Primary School, Nyaje II; Playground, Ikpai; Play Ground Owom; Primary School, Old Ndebiji; Playground Ojok; Playground, Mbeban; Primary School, Nkame; Primary School, Mfaninyen; Playground, Ekang; Playground, Akarin Mkpot; Village Square, Ojok Old Town; Village Square, Akaran Mkpot; Primary School, Mkpot; Playground, Ekpinini, Orem
Akamkpa	Mbarakom	Primary School, Mbarakom; Playground, Mbarakom; Old Postal Agency; Town Hall Mbarakom; Aniking Playground; Nsan Bus Stop(Inside The Structure); Primary School Njagachang I; Primary School Njagachang II; Primary School, Camp I; Playground, Camp II; Townhall, Camp III; Playground, Camp IV; Playground, Camp V; Village Square, Njagachang I; Village Square, Njagachang II
Akamkpa	Oban	Primary School, Neghe; Primary School Ekong; Primary School, Oban I; Primary School, Oban II; Play Ground, Oban Ext.; Play Ground, Camp I; Primary School Ibe Quarters; Play Ground, Camp II; Primary School, Camp III; Playground, Camp IV; Playground, Camp V; Playground, Oban; Playground, Mangor; Otitab Farms
Akamkpa	Ojuk North	Primary School, Oberekai; Playground, Oberekai; Primary School, Mbobui; Primary School, Mfamosing I; Primary School, Mfamosing II; Playground, Abiati; Primary School, Ekong-Anaku; Playground, Ekong-Anaku; Village Square, Etim Ayip
Akamkpa	Ojuk South	Primary School, Okoroba; Mile 29 Playground; Playground Aningeje; Primary School, Aningeje; Kwafalls Camp Square; Camp III Ndingane; Camp IV Ndingane; Camp I Kwafalls; Primary School, Ndingane; Village Square, Nsunakan I
Akamkpa	Uyanga	Dukwe Camp Hall; Igbofia Estate; Duwang Playground; Crel Hall; Calabar River Camp; Primary School, Ojor Camp; Primary School Iwuru Central; Primary School Uyanga; Primary School Uyanga II; Customary Court Hall; Ikami Play Ground; Secondary School, Ojor; Ifumkpa Playground; Okopedi Playground; Govt. School, Uwet; Uwet Camp Hall; Akwa Ibami Playground; Budeng Village Square; Ekpri Ibami Village Square; Ewen Playground; Government Guest House; Mkpara Playground; Kizito Camp Play Ground
Akpabuyo	Atimbo East	Playground, Ikot Ekanem Nya; Secondary School Ikot Ewa; Primary School Esuk Ekpo Eyo; Playground, Atimbo (Near Police College); Primary School Ikot Offiong Ambai; Bus Stop Ikot Offiong Ambai; Playground Ikot Uba; Playground Ifondo; Playground, Ekpri Ikot Effanga; Playground, Ekpene Ikot Umo; Playground Anwa Enang; Ikot Ekanem Nya Hall
Akpabuyo	Atimbo West	Primary School, Eto Mkpe Yellow Duke(A); Primary School Eto Mkpe Yellow Duke Hall; Playground Eto Mkpe Achibong; Village Square, Urua Nyomebe; Playground Ikot Okon Eniang; Primary School Ikot Effanga; Playground, Etak Ukana; Playground, Ikot Edem Itu; Primary School, Ikot Okpo Ene; Playground, Ikot Okpo; Playground Ikot Ndarake; Primary School Atim Assam; Playground, Atim Asam Junction; Playground Oton
Akpabuyo	Eneyo	Playground, Edemesa Abako; Playground, Ebisa Eneyo; Townhall, Ikot Adiaha; Playground Ikot Otu Abasi; Playground Urua Etak Uyayak; Playground, Ikot Umo Edem; Playground Ikot Inyang; Town Hall, Ikot Asuquo Effiong Anye; Townhall, Akwa Obio Inwang; Eneyo Memorial Primary School; Playground, Ikot Oyom; Playground, Esuk Mesembe; Townhall, Ekpri Ikot Eyo Edem; Market Square Mkprok; Ebisa Eneyo Square
Akpabuyo	Idundu/Anyanganse	Primary School, Idundu; Playground, Idundu/Ebiet Okon; Primary School Asabanka; Playground, Ifeta; Playground, Nkwa Itiat; Playground, Etantan; Playground, Ikot Effiong Effiom; Primary School Anyanganse; Playground Anyanganse; Primary School, Akansoko; Playground Akansoko; Primary School Assembly Hall Idundu
Akpabuyo	Ikang Central	Primary School, Ikang Town; Playground, Ikang Town; New Motor Park; Ikang Old Motor Park; Playground, Edik Idim Ikot Effanga; Playground, Edik Idim Ikot Eyi; Playground, Akwa Obutong; Playground, Ine Nkan Okure; Playground, Ine Nwak Offiong; Playground, Ine Akpa Ikang; Playground, Ine Ekpo; Primary School Ekpri Ikang; Playground, Anansa Beach; Ikang Market Square
Akpabuyo	Ikang North	Playground, Esuk Efio Obori; Townhall, Ekpri Obio Abakpa; Primary School Ifiang Ayong; Primary School Ifiang Nsung; Playground Ikot Inwang; Playground Obot Okon Idem; Playground Edik Okon Idem; Playground Esuk Okon; Primary School Akwa Ubom; Primary School, Ikot Effiom; Playground Camp III; Playground Esuk Aye; Esuk Efio Obori Square; Primary School Assembly Hall Ifiang Ayong
Akpabuyo	Ikang South	Primary School Esighi; Playground, Ekpene Esuk; Playground, Akwa Obio Inwang; Playground, Ikot Abasi Effiong; Playground, Nyom Idibi; Secondary School Esighi; Play Ground, Ikot Owok Nyama; Primary School Esit Ikot Nsidung; Playground, Esit Ikot Nsa Ewa; Playground, Okukubarakpa; Playground, Idua Inwang; Playground, Ine Akpa Inwang; Playground, Asiak Obufa Itam; Primary School Field Esighi
Akpabuyo	Ikot Edem Odo	Playground, Ikot Ekong; Primary School, Ikot Edem Odo; Townhall, Ikot Edem Odo; Health Centre, Ikot Edem Odo; Primary School Ikot Effiong Essien; Primary School Esuk Mbat; Playground Ekpri Ikot Umo; Playground Ekpri Ikot Edet Achibong; Playground Ekpri Ikot Edet Nsa; Playground Usung Idim Yellow Duke; Play Ground, Esuk Mba; Townhall, Ikot Ekpo Eyo; Primary School Field, Ikot Edem Odo
Akpabuyo	Ikot Eyo	Playground, Ikot Okon Idem; Playground, Ikot Efio Enang; Primary School Ikot Eyo Edem; Playground, Ikot Eyo Edem; Playground Ikot Anasua; Playground Ikot Edet Nsa; Playground Ikpa Nkanya; Playground Ikot Ekpo Essien; Primary School Ifiang King Duke; Playground, Ifiang King Duke; Playground, Ekan Edak; Primary School Field Ikot Eyo Edem
Akpabuyo	Ikot Nakanda	Primary School, Ikot Nakanda; Playground, Ikot Nakanda; Playground, Okoroba Oyo Ita; Playground, Ikot Nyanya; Primary School Idebe Offiong Umo; Playground, Idebe Ikot Esu; Playground, Idebe Ikot Essien; Playground, Esuk Idebe; Playground, Ikot Asikpo
Bakassi	Abana	Primary School, Abana; Play Ground Ufot Utan; Playground Okposo; Play Ground Ikot Ntuen; Playground, Onosi I; Playground Onosi II; Playground Ubere Mong
Bakassi	Akpankanya	Play Ground, Akpankanya; Playground, Ekimenen/Okong Enyong; Playground Ine Ekoi; Play Ground Uruanyan I; Play Ground, Etak Edat; Play Ground Ine Ubere Ofum; Play Ground Uruanyan II; Play Ground Ine Utan Udia
Bakassi	Ambai Ekpa	Play Ground, Ndor; Playground, Eso Andu; Playground Ine Qufe Idea; Play Ground Ekimindo; Play Ground, Ine Umo
Bakassi	Amoto	Playground, Ine Unya; Playground, Afia Utan; Playground Okom Kiet; Playground Inwang Esit Ikot; Playground, Ine Etak Ukim; Playground Ancha Anating; Playground Bekwe Amoto
Bakassi	Archibong	Primary School, Archibong Town; Playground, Edik Esuk I; Playground Ine Utatan I; Playground Ine Utatan II; Playground, Archibong Town; Playground, Efe Eyo; Playground Edik Esuk II
Bakassi	Atai Ema	Primary School, Atai Ema; Play Ground, Edet Anatigha; Playground Ema Andem Ema; Play Ground Ukpabio Ema; Play Ground, Sand Sand II; Play Ground, Ema Antigha; Play Ground Asuquo Ema; Play Ground Ikot Okon Asuquo
Bakassi	Efut Inwang	Play Ground, Efut Obot Ikot; Play Ground, Ine Ambeno; Playground Debondo; Playground Ine Efa; Play Ground, Makomia; Play Ground, Efut Inwang; Play Ground Yanga Demoga
Bakassi	Ekpot Abia	Playground, Ekpot Abia; Playground, Atabia/Effanga Edem; Playground Umo Offiong; Play Ground Esuk Asikpo; Play Ground, Asuabiat; Play Ground, Ine Ibekwe; Health Centre, Ekpot Abia
Bakassi	Odiong	Playground, Edem Abasi; Playground, Bassey Effiong; Playground Etetim Effiom; Playground Efio Edem; Playground, Atayo Umo
Bekwarra	Abuochiche	Customary Court Premises Abuochiche; Playground, Abuochiche; Primary School Abuochiche; Primary School Itekpa
Bekwarra	Afrike Ochagbe	Playground, Lagos-Ikahor; Playground, Ikahor; Town Hall, London / Ibadan; St. David's Primary School, Ochagbe; Market Square, Obanishe
Bekwarra	Afrike Okpeche	Ohangabi Playground; Bus Stop (Near Postal Agency); St. Ignatius Primary School A.; St. Ignatius Primary School B.; Playground Egurude; Obanishe Playground; Playground America
Bekwarra	Beten	Obagane Play Ground Beten; St. Justine's Primary School Beten; Primary School Ikanda; Primary School Akpakpa; Primary School Utugbor; Primary School Abuana; Ebieko Town Hall; Abuana Town Hall
Bekwarra	Gakem	Agbara Playground; St. Mark's Primary School A, Gakem A.; St. Mark's Primary School, Gakem B.; Health Centre Gakem; Ayogoba Junction; Iiah Playground Gakem; Atibulum Primary School; Abukpem Primary School; Akanaba Primary School Gakem; Ichiakpo Playground, Gakem; Akurinyi Primary School, Gakem; Inyie-Alibi Playground Gakem; Adachi Playground, Gakem
Bekwarra	Ibiaragidi	Primary School, Ububa-Iye; Primary School, Anyikang; Opposite Bible College Anyikang; Primary School Ibiaragidi; Playground, Ebegang; Bus Stop, Ebegang; Ibiaragidi - Iye Junction; Ububa - Iye Junction; Open Space, Ebegang
Bekwarra	Nyanya	Nyanya New Junction, Nyanya; Primary School, Nyanya- Olim; Nyanya Playground, Nyanya; Nyanya Town Hall, Nyayan; Ikparikobo Playgroung, Nyanya; Alumonye Playground, Nyanya; Primary School, Nyanya Idigwe; Ukporo - Ukpo, Nyanya; Ichogodo Playground, Nyanya; Primary School, Abuagbor - Iye, Nyanya; Ago-Oshibelim Play Ground, Nyanya; Onwalong Play Ground, Nyanya
Bekwarra	Otukpuru	Ayage Play Ground; Ubepa Play Ground; Bewoo Primary School; Primary School Otukpuru - Ukum; Primary School, Abnagbor - Ukum
Bekwarra	Ugboro	Playground, Ijibor; Town Hall Ijibor; Ijibor Postal Agency; Community Sec. School, Ugboro; Primary School, Ugboro; Primary School, Utukwe; Playground Ubua-Ukum; Primary School, Akurinyi; Primary School, Ukpada; Ugboro Bus Stop
Bekwarra	Ukpah	St. Augustine's Primary School, Ukpah (A); St. Augustine's Primary School, Ukpah (B); Community Sec. Sch. Ukpah; Bus Stop Market Square Ukpah; Holy Child Convent Primary School Ukpah; Play Ground, Agim; Unwapu Playground; Play Ground, Ukparibu; Playground, Agbalu; St. Stephen's Primary School, Ukpah; Ukpah Market Square; St. Phinbar's Primary School, Ukaribu; Uwagba Playground, Ukpah
Biase	Abayong	Playground, Ijom I; Playground, Ijom II; Playground, Ijom III; Playground, Inuk; Playground, Abredang; Abredang Uwom Ase Obai; Primary School, Abamba; Playground, Abrijang; Playground, Abapia; Playground, Abaribara; Primary School, Ijom
Biase	Adim	Igbase Town Hall; Obioko Square, Adim; Ekpang Owai Hall, Adim; Onun Eko Village Hall; Obu's Village Square; Ekpet Village Hall, Adim; Primary School Adim; Prisons Farm Centre
Biase	Agwagune/Okurike	Village Square, Emomoro; Play Ground, Emouno; Village Square, Egbesim; Playground, Akogbenyim; Primary School, Itu Agwagune; Market Square, Itu Agwagune; Secondary School, Okurike; Playground, Okurike Ebi; Primary School, Okurike I; Primary School, Okurike II; Village Square, Ibenabang; Play Ground, Uso Inyang; Play Ground, Imaseko Effime; Playground, Emo Uso
Biase	Akpet/Abini	Primary School, Akparavuni; Town Hall, Umai. I; Town Hall, Umai. II; Village Square, Ibogo I; Village Square, Ibogo II; Primary School Akpet Central; Bus Stop Akpet Central; Obot Otei Hall, Akpet No. I; Primary School, Akpet No. I; Village Square, Akpet No. I; Village Square, Afifia; Village Square, Emomoro; Town Hall, Edodono; Village Square, Ukwopeyere
Biase	Biakpan	Playground, Crel; Crel Rubber Estate; Play Ground, Onoruwanza; Town Hall, Onoruwanza; Primary School, Biakpan I; Primary School, Biakpan II; Playground, Emudakontang; Town Hall, Emibit I; Town Hall, Emibit II; Town Hall, Imienyo
Biase	Ehom	Secondary School, Ehom; Play Ground, Orida; Primary School, Iwuru; Village Square, Iwuru; Village Square, Ehom; Primary School, Ekpri Iko; Ibiae Camp Square; Primary School, Betem; Town Hall, Betem; Betem Dispensary; Play Ground, Idoma; Playground, Small Idoma; Play Ground Small Betem; Big Iwuru Village Square
Biase	Erei North	Primary School, Nucleus Centre; Village Square, Ipene; Primary School, Ipene; Village Square, Umuolor; Village Square, Egbor; Village Square, Etana; Village Square, Obum; Town Hall, Ase Egwu
Biase	Erei South	Edu Village Square; Oldot Town Hall; Primary School Ibini; Village Square, Ibini; Primary School, Ofono; Primary School Abanwan I; Primary School Abanwan II; Urugbam Village Square; Urugbam Town Hall; Primary School, Abanwan; Okpoma Town Hall
Biase	Ikun/Etono	Primary School, Etono Central; Primary School, Etono Central; Village Square, Etono Central; Primary School Ikun; Omobe Town Hall, Ikun; Village Square, Omobe; Market Square, Ikun; Town Square, Amanke; Primary School, Etono II; Village Square, Etono II; Farm Settlement, Ikun
Biase	Umon North	Primary School, Ikot Okpora; Village Square, Ikot Obo Isamo; Primary Kschool, Ayaba; Village Square, Ikot Anakaniyom; Crel Village Square; Primary School Ikot Ana; Primary Lschool, Ikot Ewo; Primary School, Akpasip; Primary Lschool, Bechei; Primary School, Ugbem; Primary School, Ufut
Biase	Umon South	Play Ground, Ikot Otum - Idungitu; Play Ground, Bagani; Primary School, Umon Island; Primary School, Amarurang; Playground, Ganyi; Playground, Utuma; Playground, Ikot Ogbondem; Town Hall, Itanbene
Boki	Abo	Playground, Ebam; Playground, Emeh; Playground Ogbagante I; Playground Ogbagante II; Playground, Mkpang; Playground Obisu; Playground Bonabe; Playground Bashu; Primary School, Abontakon; Playground, Bashua I; Playground, Bashua II; Playground Ayimekpang; Playground, Ochor; Playground, Orimekpang; Play Ground, Emeh Orimekpang; Playground, Abonorok I; Playground, Abonorok II; Playground, Danare I; Playground, Danare II; Playground, Danare III
Boki	Alankwu	Playground, Betriko I; Playground, Betriko II; Playground Bakum; Playground, Butatong I; Playground, Butatong II; Primary School Ashishie; Play Ground Okwabang I; Play Ground Okwabang II
Boki	Beebo/Bumaji	Primary School, Owambe; Playground, Abija; Play Ground Bejomfua; Play Ground Ukampo; Playground, Kakwe; Play Ground Otanchi; Play Ground Bambariko; Play Ground Bajiki; Play Ground, Bunfua; Play Ground, Bakuruku; Play Ground Bago/Unuh; Play Ground Bagobo; Play Ground, Ogwefor; Play Ground, Bakie; Play Ground, Yagwabe; Play Ground, Ochakwai; Play Ground, Buabri
Boki	Boje	Playground Kayang I; Playground, Kayang II; Playground Buanchor I; Playground Buanchor II; Playground, Katabang; Playground Enyi I; Playground Enyi II; Playground Kache; Playground, Asuben; Playground, Ebranta I & II; Playground Ebok; Playground Iso-Bendeghe; Playground, Kach Buchu; Playground, Bansan; Playground, Alike; Playground, Arrangha; Playground, Onicha Farm; Play Ground, Kaku Nsadop; Play Ground, Kashie; Play Ground Estate; Play Ground Kejip; Play Ground Alike II
Boki	Buda	Primary School, Katchuan; Playground, Oil Mill; Playground Katchuan; Play Ground Kaleem; Playground Adikpu; Playground Atse-Keto; Playground Bitiah; Playground Owerro; Playground, Banshie; Playground, Njawa; Playground Kak. Irruan I; Playground Kak. Irruan II; Play Ground, Kak. Irruan III; Playground, Okonde; Playground, Nkanyia; Playground, Kakubok; Playground, Bini; Playground Owuo-Etuen
Boki	Buentsebe	Playground, Ubong Alankwu; Playground, Ekumpuo I; Playground Ekumpuo II; Playground Mgbabisong; Playground, Bokalum; Playground Bamba; Playground Kabia; Playground Olum; Playground, Ukwangwo; Playground, Ukwonde; Playground, Ukwanda; Playground, Bokalum-Bebuo Attah; Playground, Oshie-Ubuanda-Bokalum II; Play Ground, Kabake-Bokalum
Boki	Bunyia/Okubuchi	Playground, Bunyia I; Playground, Bunyia II; Playground Kashie Bokom; Playground Kashie Grace; Playground, Koki Leo; Playground Akatom; Playground Bankpor I; Playground Bankpor II; Playground, Kobieshu; Playground, Kubuchi I; Playground, Kubuchi II; Playground Esekwe; Playground, Bekpor I; Playground, Bekpor II; Playground, Ndimachang; Playground, Banshay Bunyia; Playground, Oshie Bokom; Playground Oshie Edah; Playground, Konorie Boninye
Boki	Ekpashi	Playground, Agba I; Playground, Agba II; Playground Batang; Play Ground Nkim Osokom I; Play Ground, Nkim Osokom II; Playground Ntamante I & II; Playground Ntamante III; Playground Ntamante IV
Boki	Kakwagom/Bawop	Playground Obutang/Kashie Nkwaya; Playground, Ekumba; Playground, Ashang; Playground Akagbe; Playground Russia; Playground Dishishua; Playground Effigbo; Playground Bawop I; Playground, Bawop II; Playground, Bawop Central; Playground, Effiayong; Playground, Orunghe I; Playground, Orunghe II; Playground Mkpat; Playground Begbo
Boki	Ogep/Osokom	Primary School, Bansan; Playground, Bansan I; Playground, Bansan II; Playground Obubra Bansan I; Playground Obubra Bansan II; Playground Duala Arongba; Playground Ogep Osokom I; Playground Ogep Osokom II; Playground, Eshekede; Postal Agency Okundi; Primary School, Okundi; Playground Panyia; Playground, Ayibinkang; Playground Bebuoshie; Playground Eshi Agurugbe; Playground, Bafin; Playground Nfon
Boki	Oku/Borum/Njua	Playground, Alibong; Playground, Eban; Playground Eshi; Playground Camp 1 & 2; Playground Njua Kaku/Njuakeben; Playground Ebinowe; Playground Etumane; Dplayground Okubushuyu; Playground, Bokie; Playground, Okuaro; Playground, Banakong; Playground Njua Bano
Calabar Municipality	One	Primary School, Barracks Road; Eyo Eta/C. R. Radio; Near Prison Staff Canteen; Government Primary School Akim I; Government Primary School Akim II; Government Primary School Akim III; Health Tech.; Cal. Prep/Nnsl; Etta Agbor/Mbora Lane Junction; Ikang Eta/Inyang Otop Town Hall; Abang Asang/Akim Market Fence; Ekpenyong Effiom/Mbora Junction; Eyo Etta Park; Mekenge Layout Near Viciem Hotel; Etta Agbor By Former Sanitation Court; Bateba/Ettio Junction; Goldie/Mayne Avenue Extension; Primary School Barracks Road; Edem Ekpenyong By Timber Market; Federal Training Centre
Calabar Municipality	Two	Airport Field/Big Gutter; Edim Otop/Market; Edim Otop/Stream Road Junction; Otu Ansa/Immigration; Atimbo/Grand Hotel; Unical Teaching Hospital Permanent Site Gate; Otu Ansa/Oqua Street Junction; Airport Road/Edim Otop; Abang Asang Street Junction; Old Library (Unical); Malabor Male/Female Hostel; Eastern High Way/Lower Goldie Street; Goldie/Edet Essien Junction; Ekong Nyong/Bore Hole
Calabar Municipality	Three	N. A. A. Staff Quarters; F. G. G. C. School Gate; Nur. School, Nyagasang; By Evening Market Nyagasang; Near Church Of Christ Atimbo Road; Navy Town Staff Quarters; Upper Ediba Near Ikwang Church; Middle Of Ediba Road Near Assemblies Of God Church; Ediba Health Centre I; Ediba Health Centre II; Nsefik Eyo/Ediba Street; Orok Street/Ediba Junction; Okon Inok/Ediba Street Junction
Calabar Municipality	Four	Iso Oqua/Okoro Agbo Junction; Nicco Commercial Sec. Sch; Behind Desam House; Opposite Aroline Police Barracks; Ikpai Town Hall; Primary School Ediba; Big Qua Town Hall; Pcn Primary School, Big Qua; Opposite Citizen Bank By Fidelity Bank; King Str/Atekong Street.; Asi Abang/Atekong Street Junction; Atekong Town Hall; Housing Estate Primary School I; Housing Estate Primary School II; 3rd Avenue Recreational Park; Ibb/Okoro Agbo Junction; Ibom Eteta-Ita Layout
Calabar Municipality	Five	Archibong Eso By Mechanic Workshop; New Obutong/Opp. F/Mill; Essien Town/Spring Road Junction; By Wapi; A. M. E. Zion School; Primary School, Ekorinim; Ekorinim Village Centre; Near H. W. T. I Chapel; Naval Base By Stadium Gate; By Government House Gate
Calabar Municipality	Six	Nsisuk Nur. School; Nsisuk Junction Near Apostolic Church; Near God's Heritage Centre, Mcc Road; Ibok Street/Cameroun Cons.; Middle Of Nsemo By Pry Sch Annex, Nsemo Street; Town Hall Akai Effa; Near Rcc Junction; Obori Drive Near Zion Rock Church; Navy Quarter; Odukpani Rd/Ikot Eka-Idem; Ikot Eka-Idem Near Santified Mount Zion; Primary School, Ishie Town I; Primary School, Ishie Town II; Ishie Town Hall
Calabar Municipality	Seven	Town Hall Ikot Effa; Akai Village Square; Kasuk Nur. School; Esam Abasi/H/Way; Ikot Effiong Nta; Primary School, Ikot Awatim; Ikot Awatim Village Centre; Parliamentary Gate; Dr/Middle Staff Quarters; New Layout/Parl. Gate
Calabar Municipality	Eight	Primary School, Ikot Ansa I; Primary School, Ikot Ansa II; Ekan Hall I; Ekan Hall II; Civic Centre; Esuk Utan Village Junction; T. T. C. Government College Calabar; S. P. C. Calabar; Opposite Mobile Police; N. T. A. Calabar; Jimmyship Yard; Golf Field I; Golf Field II; Golf Field III; Asim Ita/High Way; Road 4, Federal Housing; Town Hall Etap Ekpo Iso/Odukpani Road
Calabar Municipality	Nine	Basin Authority Canteen; Primary School, Ikot Effanga Mkpa; Town Hall Ikot Effanga Mkpa; By Water Board Sign Post; Ikot Nkebre T/Hall; Ikot Eneobong T/Hall; Agrofeed Road Junction; People's Club, Ikot Effanga; Ikot Eneobong/Police Barracks
Calabar Municipality	Ten	Ikot Omin Motor Park; St. Augustine Primary School I; St. Augustine Primary School II; Ikot Ekpo Junction; Ikot Ekpo/Bacoco Junction; Adak Ukpa Town Hall; Poly Clinic, Ikot Omin; Pri. Sch. Nasarawa; By Small Mosque Nasarawa; Awahada/Bacoco; Obot Okoho Junction; Primary School Abenyo; Nasarawa Near Sariki's Compound; Primary School Bacoco
Calabar South	One	Cultural Centre I; Cultural Centre II; Cultural Centre III; Mary Slessor/Itu Street; Edem Odo/Bogobiri Street; Etim Edem/Goldie Street; Red Cross; Maternity/High Court I; Maternity/High Court II
Calabar South	Two	Ene Ndem/Edet Nsa Street I; Ene Ndem/Edet Nsa Street II; Coco Bassey/Marina(Maritime Workers Office); Marina/Edem Street; Marina/U. A. C.; Edet Nsa/Offiong Street; Anwa Nyoro I; Anwa Nyoro II; Anwa Nyoro III
Calabar South	Three	Duke Town Primary School; Beecroft/Nkwa Street; Offiong Square; Eyamba/Offiong Street; Eyo Edem/Offiong Street; Native Court; Edem Street/Archibong Street; Hewett/Watt I; Hewett/Watt II
Calabar South	Four	Primary School, Macdonald I; Primary School, Macdonald II; Duke Town Secondary School; Nkwa Street By Annesley Street; Annesley/Lagos Street; Henshaw Square; Edgerley/Ballantyne I; Edgerley/Ballantyne II
Calabar South	Five	Government Primary School Hawkins Rd I; Government Primary School Hawkins Rd II; Government Primary School Hawkins Rd III; Convent Primary School I; Convent Primary School II; Sacred Heart Primary School I; Sacred Heart Primary School II; Sacred Heart Primary School III; Sacred Heart Primary School IV
Calabar South	Six	Nelson Mandella/Brooks; Opp. Fed High Court By Lgea; Salvation Army Primary School; Target By Nelson Mandella; Harcourt/Bassey Duke; Holy Trinity Primary School; Clifford Road By Nigerian Legion; Calabar Road/Watt I; Calabar Road/Watt II
Calabar South	Seven	Emmanuel Church Primary School I; Emmanuel Church Primary School II; Bedwell/Dan Archibong; Allman By Victor Akan Junction; Dan Archibong/ Former Sss; Edgerley/Chamley I; Edgerley/Chamley II
Calabar South	Eight	Ekeng Ewa/Hawkins Road; Hawkins Beach Market; Henshaw Town Secondary School I; Henshaw Town Secondary School II; Edibe-Edibe/Eyo Ita Street; Edibe-Edibe/Eket Street; Ballantyne Junction; Benneth/Macgregor; Fenton By Edgerley; By Dr. Lawrence Henshaw Memorial Hospital(Former Idh); Wilkie/Edibe Edibe Road; Esin/Shanahan
Calabar South	Nine	Ironbar Primary School; Atu/Ekondo Street; Palm/Elijah Henshaw Street; Palm Street/Atu Street; Chamley/King Duke Street; Foster/Probyne Street; Ephraim/Mayne Avenue; Maple/Ephraim Street; African Field; Nyong Edem/Dan Archibong Street; Wilkie/Ephraim Street; William George/Ephraim Street; Chamley/Ephraim Street
Calabar South	Ten	Nelson Mandela By Big Gutter; Lutheran Primary School I; Lutheran Primary School II; Lutheran Primary School III; Murray/Esselfie Street; Webber Street/Opposite Centor Press; Academy/Atu Junction; Bourdillion/Odwyer Street; Government Primary School, Atu Street I; Government Primary School, Atu Street II; Government Primary School, Atu Street III
Calabar South	Eleven	Ikot/Edem Oyom/Iboku Street; Ewa Henshaw/Ibesikpo Street; Dan Henshaw/Edibe Edibe; Ibuno/Ewa Henshaw; Primary School Ambo I; Primary School Ambo II; Ikono/Dr. Dean Street; Apostolic Primary School Idang I; Apostolic Primary School Idang II; New Airport Field/Ene Ita; New World/Bassey Ekong; New Airport By Truth And Life Church Junction; Afokang/State Avenue I; Afokang/State Avenue II; Middle Of Nkese Effiong Street; Okon Eyo/Afokang Street; Abitu Junction; Middle Of Okon Edet Street; Okon Edet/Oko Kon Street; Government Secondary School, Anantigha; Prisons Town Hall I; Prisons Town Hall II; Middle Of Enobong Street; Jebs/Afokang; Mbukpa/Iman Junction I; Mbukpa/Iman Junction II; Nsit/Umo-Ukpe Junction; Infront Mbukpa Police Station I; Infront Mbukpa Police Station II; Effio-Okoho/Iboku; Ene Edet/Frazer; Itam/Asikpo Junction; Fitzibon/Essien Street; Bishop King Primary School I; Bishop King Primary School II; St. Mary's Primary School I; St. Mary's Primary School II; Convent Primary School I; Convent Primary School II; Imo/Nsit Street; New Airport Road/Tank; Apostolic Avenue/Dr Dean
Calabar South	Twelve	Primary School Mayne Avenue I; Primary School, Mayne Avenue II; Palm Street/Yellow Duke Street; Mayne Avenue/Okpo Ene Junction; Ekpo Abasi/Yellow Duke Junction; Ekpo Abasi/Bassey Street; Middle Of Abasi Edem; Yellow Duke/Rosol G. House; New Airport Road/Jebs Shopping Centre; Ekeya/Effioanwan Junction; Middle Of Dr. Ekong Street; Crutect Prefab I; Crutect Prefab II; Crutech Gate I; Crutech Gate II; Adam Duke/Kasuk; Abasi Obori/Ayatmo; Ibonda/Abasi Obori; Ayatmo/Uwanse Junction; Akpanim/Goldie Junction; Unical Staff School; Goldie/Mt. Zion Junction; Orok Orok Street By Orok Orok Lane; Goldie/Amika Utuk Street; Amika Utuk/Uwanse; Atamunu/Ezekiel Street; Atamunu/Efio Ene; Enobong/Atamunu Street; Oyo Efam/Atamunu Junction; Atamunu/Cross Road Hotel; Emillis/Ekpo Nkpo Street; Edem Edet/Enobong Street; Okon Edak/Atamunu; Middle Of Etinyin Abasi; Mt. Zion/Uduak Orok Junction; Inyang Edem/Mt. Zion; Opposite Uwanse Police Station; Abasi Edem/Akparika Junction; End Of Etinyin Abasi Street; Uwanse/Ibonda Street; Uwanse/Ekpo Eyo Junction; Asari Ntang Inim/Asuquo Nyong Street; Ekpo Abasi Technology; Musaha/Yellow Duke Junction; Pinn Margaret Secondary School
Etung	Abia	Abia Town Hall; Abia Play Ground; Space Near Abia Adc Office Block; Primary School, Abia; Bijah Play Ground; Bijah Primary School
Etung	Abijang	Primary School, Abijang; Town Hall Abijang; Play Ground, Agbotae; Town Hall, Etara; Town Hall, Ekuri; Primary School, Ekuri; Primary School Etara
Etung	Agbokim	Agbokim Waterfall Play Ground; Agbokim Town Hall; Cara Boat I, Junction Shade Along Agbokim Road; Cara Boat II, Shade Along Abia Road; Cara Boat III, Shade Along Abia Road; Ekukate Town Hall; Cara Boat IV, Open Space
Etung	Ajassor	Ajassor Play Ground; Ajassor Town Hall; Shed In Crin; Open Space, Mbabiakare; Ajassor Four Conners(Shade); Ajassor Primary School; Mfum Primary School
Etung	Bendeghe Ekiem	Agrigon Town Hall; Ayork I, Town Hall; Ayork II, Play Ground; Echintok Play Ground; Njimehmeh, Play Ground; Okosoro Town Hall; Agbor Oru Town Hall; Oserebetang Play Ground; Ekimaya Play Ground; Mba Ogim Effe Open Space, Opposite Police Station; Ekimikae Primary School; E. C. S. S. Secondary School, Etung; Bus Stop Ekimikae
Etung	Effraya	Effraya Town Hall; Beside Council Secretariat; Effraya Three Corners; Ekimaya Town Hall; Adc Shed, Open Shade Near The Open Space
Etung	Etomi	Njiminkok I, Town Hall; Njiminkok II, Play Ground; Nyarinka I, Town Hall; Nyarinka II, Play Ground; Abon-Nta Camp Play Ground; Okundi Court Yard Open Space; Mgbe-Tabe Play Ground
Etung	Itaka	Primary School Itaka; Okoroba Town Hall; Acharam Town Hall; Itaka Town Hall; Old Nfamiyem Play Ground
Etung	Mkpot/Ayuk Aba	Mkpot Isong Hall; Mkpot Primary School; Ayuk Aba Play Ground; Play Ground, Ikiribi; Play Ground, Otae Nkim; Play Ground, Ochiossor
Etung	Nsofang	Nsofang Primary School; Nsofang Town Hall; Nsofang Play Ground; Akpor Play Ground; Secondary School Nsofang; Akpor Town Hall
Ikom	Abanyum	Primary School Edor; Playground, Ekonde; Playground, Akomba; Play Ground Ekpatala; Primary School Nkim/Nkum; Play Ground Akumabal; Play Ground Abinti I; Play Ground Abinti II; Market Square Nkarasi I; Play Ground Nkarasi II; Play Ground Etikpe; Play Ground Nkonfab; Play Ground Nkum; Play Ground Abankang; Town Hall, Akumabal
Ikom	Akparabong	Onicha Farm Settlement; Bus Stop Akparabong; Playground, Nkpanjen; Town Hall Nkanacha; Play Ground Nturokim; Play Ground Ogbagante; Play Ground Olokpo; Town Hall Abanko; Primary School, Opu; Primary School, Balep I; Primary School, Balep II; Town Hall Nkpanjen
Ikom	Ikom Urban I	Mgbagatiti Play Ground; Bisogho Play Ground; Ejayip Play Ground; Asenasen Town Hall; Bokomo Town Hall; Holy Child Convent School; Hausa Quarters; Isabang Town Hall; Enoghi Town Hall; Market Square Ikom Town; New Bokomo Street 4/Corners; No. 32 Ndifon Odu Street F/C/; Old Army Barracks Gate; Primary School Asu-Egbe; 34 Ochorore St. F/Corners; No. 12 Ani Street Off Obudu Road; Alpha Filling Station; Okondi Play Ground; No. 76 Ogoja Road 4/Corners; No. 7 Old Etomiroad; Primary School, Grass Field; Play Ground Iyawende; Otere Farm Settlement; Near Of Chief Mgbe Compound, Convent Road; Agbokim Mgbabor Play Ground
Ikom	Ikom Urban II	Playground, Adijinkpor I; Play Ground, Adijinkpor; Play Ground Adijinkpor II; Adijinkpor Farm Settlement
Ikom	Nde	Playground, Etanawana; Play Ground, Nkonaten/Anagha; Town Hall Nkonaton/Anagha II; Play Ground Mbenkpen; Primary School Nde 3 Corners; Bus Stop, Nde; Play Ground Etakor; Play Ground Egonorkoe/Esaji; Play Ground, Nsak; Play Ground Ayughasa; Play Ground, Ejirawor; Play Ground Nwande/Ofafum; Primary School Mgbaka Mkpiri; Town Hall Mgbaka; Mammy Market Mgbaka; Play Ground II Etanawana; Market Square Ntonaton/Anagha
Ikom	Nnam	Playground Nlul; Playground, Alok; Playground Emaghabe; Play Ground Abilti; Play Ground, Mande/Nkleta; Play Ground Akorofono; Play Ground Nyarenkpo; Play Ground Ogomogom; Town Hall, Alok
Ikom	Nta/Nselle	Primary School, Enjemetor; Playground, Abinti; Playground Emeakpen; Playground Lebenjok; Play Ground, Ekpatala; Play Ground Nto; Play Ground Adunta; Play Ground Ngo/Ntrigon; Play Ground, Nkruabong; Primary School, Ofunta; Play Ground, Nkurufa; Play Ground Naborokpa; Play Ground, Oyenghi; Play Ground, Eyanga
Ikom	Ofutop I	Play Ground, Nkpansi; Playground, Nsa Nkpin; Play Ground Ela Osusula; Playground Ela Ekpok Nkum; Comm. Secondary School, Okangha; Customary Court Ela-Aya; Play Ground Nkpura Osiela; Nnam Play Ground; Akamafork Play Ground
Ikom	Ofutop II	Primary School, Okosora; Playground, Egun Okpun; Primary School Alesi; Playground Adibongha; Play Ground, Mbak; Primary School Ekukunela; Play Ground Osusomkpor; Play Ground Nsimaghe; Primary School, Abaragha; Play Ground, Nkpozien; Town Hall, Okosora
Ikom	Olulumo	Playground, Iyami; Primary School, Okuni Compound A; Playground Effi I; Upper Effi Junction; Play Ground Omon; Play Ground, Emmorrow; Bus Stop Akam; Play Ground Akam; Primary School, Okuni Compound B; Community Secondary School Okuni
Ikom	Yala/Nkum	Playground Orom; Playground Obioko; Playground, Okpochi; Play Ground Okoroba; Play Ground Opuiji; Play Ground, Owom; Bus Stop Atimaka; Play Ground Opuwowe; Play Ground, Mbianang
Obanliku	Basang	Udeshi Town Hall; Kukare Town Hall; Bayamang Town Hall; Bayanu Town Hall; Primary Sch. Bayasung; Bayabo Town Hall; Kabon Town Hall; Kalane Town Hall; Bayalele Town Hall; Irriagwu Town Hall; Bayapri / Kakwa Playground; Bayatuo Town Hall; Bayama Health Centre; Bayalele Playground
Obanliku	Bebi	Playground Bugene; Playground, Begbong; Blokoun Town Hall; Primary School, Bayaluga; Sankwala Market Square; Near Rev. Ogar's Frontage, San Kwala; Near J. A. Jumbo's Compound; Opposite Police Station, Sankwala
Obanliku	Becheve	Primary School Amana; Primary School Belinge; Ogbakoko Town Hall; Kotele Play Ground; Primary School Iyendeve; Primary Sch., Ranch; Osenikpa Play Ground; Matu, New Ikwate P/G
Obanliku	Bendi I	Playground, Ketting; Primary School, Ketting; Play Ground, Begiatsul; Near Peter Agba's Entrance Begiatsul; Akorshi Market Square; Begiatee Play Ground; Bendigie Town Hall; Waiting Shade Bus Stop Bendigie
Obanliku	Bendi II	Omale Market Square; Lishikwel Market Square; Primary School Begiagba; Begiagba Town Hall; Kakwalaka Town Hall
Obanliku	Bishiri North	Primary School Bishiri; Lishiche Playground; Kakwe Playground; Primary School Shikpeche; Utabu Market Square; Playground, Bishiri
Obanliku	Bishiri South	Government Primary School Amunga; Utuhu Play Ground; Primary School Ablesang; Buya Play Ground; Utuhu Town Hall
Obanliku	Bisu	Bukumanya Town Hall; Bayaga Playground; Bebuenkayang Playground; Bussanagfong Play Ground; Primary School, Bayayam; Busanepong Town Hall
Obanliku	Busi	Bucham Etsong Play Ground; Bintobe Playground; Bucham Bunya Play Ground; Bikka Town Hall; Begore Playground; Ijua Market Square
Obanliku	Utanga	Customary Court Besenge I; Customary Court Besenge II; Primary School Kundeve I; Primary School Kundeve II; Bagga Primary School; Primary School Boggo; Ext. Primary School Vahong; Primary School Bagga
Obubra	Ababene	Government Primary School Ababene; Ababene Town Hall; 6 Corners Ababene; Ochekira Town Hall; Ababene Health Centre; Ofura Primary School; Primary School Arobom; Primary School Obubem; Play Ground, Akpatre; 4 Corners Ababene; Play Ground, Joboknode; Ijirewot; Primary School, Ababene
Obubra	Apiapum	Pcn Apiapum; Elf Filling Station; Customary Court; Community Secondary School; Iyami Play Ground; Obebema Play Ground; Timber Market; Nnunkpen Bus Stop; Obok-Onode Play Ground
Obubra	Iyamoyong	Primary School Okomorotet; Playground Iyamoyong; Round About Iyamoyong; Enona Town Hall; Iyamoyong Market Square; Okparero Town Hall; Oteteh Atet Town Hall; Play Ground Ebora Iyamoyong; Primary School, Iyamitet; Play Ground Iyamitet; Primary School Iyamitet; Play Ground Agoi Road Iyamitet; Play Ground Ekomorotet; Water Pump Station Iyamoyong; Market Square Iyamitet
Obubra	Obubra Urban	Court Hall, Obubra Village; Owakande I Town Hall; Owakande I Play Ground; Ogada II Bus Stop; Mile I Bust Stop; Ogada I Play Ground; Primary School, Ogada I; Imabana Ochokwu Play Ground; Primary School, Imabana Itamtet; Owakande II Bus Stop; Obubra Village Play Ground I; Obubra Village Play Ground II; Round About, Obubra Urban
Obubra	Ochon	Primary School, Ochon; Ofunafu Play Ground; Ochon Bus Stop; Odonget Play Ground; Isabang Play Ground; Onyenekpen Play Ground; Play Ground Onyenorangha; Akam Ogbagwoni Play Ground; Edondon Play Ground; Okokori Play Ground; Ohana Play Ground; Edondon Primary School; Ohana Primary School; Ogambang Play Ground; Town Hall Onyenokpen
Obubra	Ofat	Primary School, Ofat; Oderegha Play Ground; Okorokpana Play Ground; Ovokwa Primary School; Onyadama Primary School; Play Ground Ebo; Ofat Okwudo; Ofat Play Ground; Onyadama Play Ground; Play Ground Ovokwa; Oderegha Town Hall
Obubra	Ofodua	Holy Child Convent Primary School; Play Ground Ofodua; Ofodua Water Side Play Ground I; Ofodua Water Side Play Ground II; Primary School, Onyekpenden I; Primary School, Onyekpenden II; Play Ground Mughe I; Play Ground Ochikpo; Play Ground Ijoda; Town Hall Ofodua; Play Ground Mughe
Obubra	Ofumbongha/Yala	Ofumbongha Play Ground I; Ofumbongha Play Ground II; Ofumbongha Play Ground III; Ofumbongha Play Ground IV; Osini Play Ground; Osakan Play Ground; Primary School, Araragha; Okokoma Play Ground; Obokpa Play Ground; Primary School Nkum Akpambe; Play Ground, Nkum Akpambe; Primary School Osakan; Okpangut Play Ground; Primary School Ofumbongha IV; Market Square Nkum Akpambe
Obubra	Osopong I	Primamry School, Ogurude; Court Hall, Ogurude; Play Ground Ogurokpon; Primary School Okpechi; Primary School, Ofonmana; Primary School, Okimbongha; Primary School, Ijeghe Orangha; Ijutum Primary School; Play Ground, Idoru; Primary School Apiapum Tet; Play Ground, Eja; Play Ground Ofonekom; Play Ground Omene; Play Ground Ofonama; Play Ground Ogamana; Primary School Ijeghe Ibum; Play Ground Owakande Ekpa; Play Ground, Ogurude
Obubra	Osopong II	Playground, Ofia Oji; Play Ground Onyenyim; Play Ground Ndubia; Play Ground Ohenna Edda; Play Ground Odageri Edda; Play Ground, Minikum; Primary School Onyadalogu; Play Ground Enyibilhiri; Pcn Isobo Itaka; Pcn Isobo Bikobiko; Play Ground, Ndio Mejiotaka; Play Ground Azuofia Enyigba; Play Ground Egu Echara; Play Ground Ichorikpa; Play Ground Izoda Otaka; Play Ground Ebura Echara; Play Ground Ndi-Igwe Bikobiko; Play Ground, Isobo Otaka
Obubra	Ovonum	Primary School, Ovonum; Play Ground Ovonum; Ibca Ovonum; Primary School, Ofatura; Primary School Ahaha; Play Ground, Ovonum; Bus Stop Ovonum; Play Ground Owonokwe; Hausa Quarter, Ofatura; Play Ground Okupe; Play Ground, Ofatura; Bus Stop Ofatura
Obudu	Alege/Ubang	Primary School, Amukwong; Alege Maternity, Okikwo; Ngorkpu Town Hall; Primary School, Okordem; Araru Playground; Abuasu Playground; Biwhue Playground; Primary School, Okweriseng; Primary School, Okiro; Ofambe Play Ground; Primary School, Ofambe
Obudu	Angiaba / Begiaka	Primary School, Bedia; Begiagba Town Hall, Bedia; Bikwom Playground; Atiekpe Town Hall; Kudiang Playground, Bedia; Primary School Ibong I; Primary School, Ibong II; Betan Play Ground; Chief Ugbe's Playground; Agba Adah's Playground; Okorshie Play Ground; Ikwen's Playground Okorshie; Kubong Bette Playground; Idilagba Playground Kubong Bette
Obudu	Begiading	Ugarbu Play Ground, Igwo; Primary School, Igwo I; Primary School, Igwo II; Betukwel Bus Stop; Primary School, Betukwel; Near Kutia R. C. M. Church; Primary School, Ohang; Near Chief C. U. Ugbe's Frontage; Itikib Town Hall; Ohong Playground; Biwa Town Hall; R. C. M. Primary School Begiaba; Iti's Primary School Begiaba; Primary School, Kutiang I; Primary School, Kutiang II; Kutiang I, Town Hall
Obudu	Ipong	Bebuaghbong Corner; Bebuaghbong Town Hall; St. Therera's Primary School Kakum; Kakum Town Hall; Bepeh's Playground Kakum; Near A. G. M. Church Bebuabie; Bebuabie Town Hall; R. C. M. Primary School Bebuabie; Bebuabie Health Centre; Bebuabie Town Hall Bebuatsuan; Primary School, Bebuatsuan
Obudu	Obudu Urban I	Government Secondary School, Obudu; Primary School, Udigie; St. Stephen's Primary School Obudu; Customary Court Obudu; Andenson/Adaliku Street; Timber Market Obudu; 39, Market Rd. Obudu(Near Fatima Nawa's Compound); Uko Adaga's Playground Abonkib; St. Patrick's Primary School; Eyam's Playground Atiekpe; Ushie's Playground Bebuagam; Agwuble's Playground; Bebuabong Playground; Akpo's Playground Bebuwhan; Playground Along Okwel-Obudu Road
Obudu	Obudu Urban II	Near Moses Itashi's Frontage; Primary School Okwel-Obudu; Near Godwin Udie's Frontage; Bitul Playground; Akpowho's Playground; Ikagio's Playground; Ikwomikwu Playground
Obudu	Ukpe	Ikong Play Ground; Primary School Karu; Kigbor Playground; Primary School, Ashikpe; Bayatung Play Ground; Primary School, Owong; Bayobri Play Ground; Ekweke Playground, Bayobri
Obudu	Utugwang Central	St. Colman's Primary School I; St. Colman's Primary School II; Near Idoko Etere'E Frontage; Main Nkirira Playground Ejagbe; Primary School, Ejagbe; Primary School, Ukpirinyi; Near Chief Okpam's Frontage; Rikwen Playground
Obudu	Utugwang North	Primary School Ukwortung; Primary School Mgbenege; Primary School, Ukwutia I; Primary School Ukwutia II; Primary School Ejakpe; Near A. G. M Church Ejakpe; Near Eneji Egrinya Frontage; Near Ushie Ewhenke Frontage
Obudu	Utugwang South	Eten Okobo Town Hall; Near A. G. M. Church Ubadem; Achu Mgbom's Playground Ukpada; Primary School Ukpada I; Near Agana Okpamu's Frontage; Primary School, Ukpada II; Old Primary School, Eluka; Near Abu's Frontage; Primary School, Okorogung
Odukpani	Adiabo/Efut	Primary School, Ikot Ukpa; Primary School, Efut Ibonda; Primary School, Adiabo Okurikang; Play Ground, Adiabo Akani Obio; Play Ground, Ukpahata; Play Ground, Mkpara Otop; Play Ground, Usung Mbakara/Ikot Ekong
Odukpani	Akamkpa	Play Ground, Akani Obio Oboroko; Primary School, Akpap Okoyong; Village Square, Akpap Okoyong; Secondary School, Akpap Okoyong; Play Ground, Idim-Iko; Play Ground, Nduoduo; Play Ground, Akamkpa; Play Ground, Ubambat; Play Ground, Esuk Ekom; Primary School, Oboroko; Play Ground, Oboroko; Play Ground, Kaifa
Odukpani	Creek Town I	Secondary School, Creek Town; Primary School, Creek Town; Primary School, Ukim Ita; Village Square, Ukim Ita; Primary School, Useku; Primary School, Five Towns; Primary School, Ikot Esu; Primary School, Esine Ufot; Village Square, Esine Ufot; Primary School, Efut Ifako; Play Ground, Mbombori
Odukpani	Creek Town II	Primary School, Ikot Essien; Primary School, Urua Etak Uyo; Primary School, Ikot Okon Abasi; Primary School, Okimbe; Primary School, Ikot Eyo Okon; Play Ground, Nyomidibi; Play Ground, Ikot Effiok Ekpenyong
Odukpani	Ekori/Anaku	Primary School, Ifako; Playground, Afaha; Playground, Ekenge; Play Ground, Nyakasang; Primary School, Ndon-Nyam; Play Ground, Inua-Akpa; Primary School, Ikot Effiong Otop; Primary School, Okpok Ikpa; Play Ground, Nkita; Postal Agency, Okurikang; Play Ground, Obot Akpang; Play Ground, Ikot Offiong Ebe; Play Ground, Ukem; Play Ground, Nta Obo; Play Ground, Ndonitri; Play Ground, Okurikang
Odukpani	Eniong	Primary School, Obio Usiere; Primary School, Atan Onoyom; Primary School, Ikot Ebiti; Play Ground, Okpo Eniong; Primamry School, Asang Eniong; Primary School, Ikot Offiong Ebiti; Play Ground, Ntan Obu Ukpe; Primary School, Obot Akpabio; Primary School, Isong Inyang; Play Ground, Uyi Ikot Ekanem; Village Square, Ikot Udia; Play Ground, Odung Eniong
Odukpani	Eki	Primary School, Atan Eki; Playground, Esuk Atan Eki; Playground, Obodio Eki; Play Ground, Afia Isong Eki; Primary School, Idim Ndom; Play Ground, Idim Utan; Primary School, Ekpene Eki; Play Ground, Obio Nno; Play Ground, Atan Eki; Play Ground, Mkpatuk Eki; Play Ground, Obot Ekpene
Odukpani	Obomitiat/Mbiabo/Ediong	Playground, Anwa Ibok; Primary School, Obomitiat; Primary School, Mbiabo Edere; Play Ground, Obomitiat; Play Ground, Ikot Iwatt; Play Ground, Etche-Ntem; Play Ground, Iso Esuk; Play Ground, Ekanem Ukim; Play Ground, Akwa Ikot; Play Ground, Ine Odu; Primary School, Ediong
Odukpani	Odot	Primary School, Esuk Odot; Play Ground, Atan Odot; Primary School, Odot Uyi; Primary School, Usung Esuk; Play Ground, Efedem; Play Ground, Esuk Ikwo Edet; Primary School, Ndon Nwong; Play Ground Usung Odot/Mberebere; Play Ground, Ekim Ebebit; Play Ground Akwa Ekim; Village Square, Ndon Nwong
Odukpani	Odukpani Central	Esuk Otu, Primary School; Primary School, Adiabo Ikot Otu Ibuot; Primary School, Esine Ufot Adiabo; Camp Square, Banga Camp; Primary School, C. O. P. E.; Primary School, Akim Akim; Town Hall, Akpung; Primary School, New Netim; Health Centre, Odukpani; Play Ground, Oduyama; Odukpani Junction Square; Camp Square, Pamol Odukpani
Odukpani	Oniman-Kiong	Playground, Ekemkpon; Playground, Ikot Okon Akiba; Primary School, Okoyong Usang Abasi; Play Ground, Ikot Nyong; Play Ground, Okpan-Kiong; Play Ground, Atan Okoyong
Odukpani	Ikoneto	Old Primary School, Ikoneto; Playground, Ikoneto; Primary School, Akwa Efe; Play Ground, Ikot Eniang Nkpo; Play Ground, Akpamfrukim; Play Ground, Obut Urua
Odukpani	Ito/Idere/Ukwa	Primary School, Iboho Ito; Playground, Obukpok Ito; Central School, Ito; Play Ground, Ikot Esuk, Ito; Play Ground, Ono Ito; Play Ground, Obot Esu Ito; Primary School, Mbiabong; Play Ground, Ekim/Enen Ito; Play Ground, Obot Ekpene Ito; Primary School, Idere; Play Ground, Usung Ikpa; Play Ground Ewe; Play Ground, Obokwo Omuno; Play Ground, Mbiawa; Play Ground, Ubene Okonabia; Play Ground, Obukwo Esa; Primary School, Ukwa; Play Ground, Ewen; Play Ground, Akani Obio; Play Ground, Ikesi/Ikot Eduon; Primary School, Mbiabong Ukwa; Play Ground, Ifo; Play Ground, Nuong Mfa
Ogoja	Ekajuk I	Playground, Bansara; Playground Egbung; Primary School, Ekwaro; Playground, Ewinimba; Primary School Mfom I; Primary School Mfom II; Playground, Egbanafom; Primary School, Ntara; Playground, Ntara Waterside; Primary School, Eyanjul; Primary School, Emmandack; Health Centre, Nkpana; Playground, Adigbo
Ogoja	Ekajuk II	Playground, Eshinjuck; Playground, Esham I; Play Ground, Esham II; Playground, Ekpugrinya; Primary School, Nwang; Play Ground, Mbarekul; Play Ground, Egoja Ndim; Playground, Egul; Play Ground, Mbock Junction; In Front Of Egim Ebo, Nwang II; Playground, Abuntak
Ogoja	Mbube East I	Primary School, Nkim I; Primary School, Nkim II; Play Ground, Nkim; Playground, Ogberia Ogang; Play Ground, Mpang Ogberia-Ochoro; St. Peter's Primary School, Ojerim I; St. Peter's Primary School, Ojerim II; Playground, Ojerim Ereh; St. Francis Primary School, Ogang-Ogberia; Play Ground, Igung-Ojerim
Ogoja	Mbube East II	Play Ground, Aragbang; Primary School, Benkpe; Playground, Benkpe; Primary School, Egbe I; Primary School, Egbe II; Play Ground, Egbe-Egbudu; Playground, Kesube, Egbe; Mpang Abang Play Ground, Egbe; Play Ground, Oboso Ereh; Primary School, Oboso Aragbang
Ogoja	Mbube West I	Playground, Odamagbuju-Ekumtak; Lutheran Primary School, Ekumtak; Playground, Kadama, Ekumtak; Primary School, Mpang Abang Libie Ekumtak; Play Ground, Owarakande Ekumtak; Convent Primary School, Idum; Play Ground, Okambi; Play Ground Mpam Mgbinyi, Idum; Play Ground, Mpam Atam Idum; Play Ground Abuekpu, Idum; Play Ground, Abuekpu; Market Square, Idum; Play Ground, Mpam Atam, Idum; Play Ground, Mpam Bekwel
Ogoja	Mbube West II	St. Joseph Primary School Bansan; Playground, Bansan; Playground Edide I; Play Ground Edide II; Play Ground, Mkpat, Odajie I; Play Ground Mkpat, Odajie II; Christ The King Primary School, Odajie; Play Ground Adagom Odajie; Market Square, Odajie; Play Ground, Asaba Odajie
Ogoja	Nkum Iborr	St. Vincent Primary School, Alladim; Primary School, Igodor; Playground, Nfekpa, Igodor; Primary School, Ikandagah; Play Ground, Ikabe; Primary School Mbagide; St. Mark's Primary School, Ukpagada I; St. Mark's Primary School Ukpagada II; Play Ground Ating Ukpe; Play Ground, Nkpote Ukep; Ating Alladim Playground
Ogoja	Nkum Irede	Playground Aburu Mbede, Ibil I; Playground Aburu Mbede, Ibil II; Playground Ishindene, Ibil I; Play Ground Ishindene, Ibil II; Primary School, Ibil; Play Ground Itung, Ibil; Play Ground, Ibil; Customary Court Nkum
Ogoja	Ogoja Urban I	Holy Child Convent Primary School, Agiga I; Holy Child Convent Primary School, Agiga II; Holy Child Convent Primary School, Agiga III; Garki Okuku Road; St. Ben's Dem Primary School Igoli. I; St. Ben's Dem. Primary School, Igoli. II; Maternity Hospital Moniaya; Near B. I. R. Office; Play Ground Ukamusha, Ishibori. I; Play Ground Ikaptang, Ishibori. II; St. Andrew's Primary School I; Play Ground, Ishibori; St. Ben's Primary School, Ogoli I; St. Ben's Primary School, Ogoli II; St. Ben's Primary School, Ogoli III; St. Ben's Primary School, Ogoli IV; Playground Ishibori
Ogoja	Ogoja Urban II	Ntol Comprehensive Secondary School Ndok; Ntol Comp. Sec. Sch. / Ndok; Playground, Ndok America; St. Theresa's Primary School Ogboja; St. Theresa's Primary School, Ogbaja; Play Ground Ogboja; Play Ground, Ogboja; Motor Park Abakpa; Play Ground Okende; Boki Road By Mech. Workshop Abakpa; Njerman Lane Abakpa; Play Ground, Adagom
Yakurr	Afrekpe/Ekpenti	Lekpankom, Community Hall; Yagbunji Town Hall; Outside Postal Agency; St. Francis Primary School; Kotani Play Ground; Yagbunji Civic Centre; Ibom Play Ground; Primary School, Afrekpe; Market Square, Ekori Beach
Yakurr	Ajere	Edang Town Hall; Primary School, No. 3, Ajere; Primary School, No. 1, Ajere; Outside Kotani Town Hall; Akugom Town Hall; Primary School No. 3, Ajere; Kotani Town Hall; Mkpantili Play Lkground; Ugbemuma Town Hall; Apostolic Primary School, Ekori; Okonobongha Play Ground; Outside Edang Town Hall
Yakurr	Assiga	St. Peters Primary School; Gesila; Ekunkune; Old Town Market Square; Levate Town Hall; Afrekpe Market Square; Osaja Town Hall; Pcn, Assiga; St. Peter's Primary School Lefani
Yakurr	Biko Biko	Biko Biko Town Hall; Park Road; Ediba Road By Obimbang Street; Near Ofem Okri's Compound; In Front Of Licensing Office; Court Premises; Yabiagban, Ikpakapit Junction; Obimbang Street By Okoi Junction; In Front Of Nepa Office
Yakurr	Idomi	Pcn Primary School I; Pcn Primary School II; Egbizum Town Hall; Egbizum Play Ground; Otalosi Town Hall; Otalosi Play Ground; Okom Town Hall; Kekowa Play Ground; Lebolkom/Okom Old Town; Pcn Primary School, Idomi
Yakurr	Ijiman	Near Chief Uket Egom's Compound; Near Enang Ubi's Compound; Ijiman Evening Market; Near Utum Etowa's Frontage; Near Ibiang Usang's Frontage; Ijiman Play Ground, Ugom; Apostolic Primary School; Near Chief Amo's Obeten's Frontage; Near Chief Ebri Lekam's Frontage
Yakurr	Ijom	Old Market Road Opposite Nkanu Okio; St. Mary's Primary School, Ugep; Old Market Road, Beside Maygo; Ijom St, Beside Late Eno Eko; Left Side Of General Hospital Gate; Ijom Town Hall; St. Peter's Primary School, Ugep; Egeiti; Ikpa Lang, Near Of Eld Out Arikpo; Near Chief Okon Obeten's Compound; Ketabebe Play Ground; Near Eld. Bassey Ubi's Counpound; Government Primary School, Ugep; Near Onun Joel's Compound, Ntiefoli; Presbyterian Primary School, Ugep
Yakurr	Ikpakapit	Convent Primary School, Ugep; St. Theresa's Primary School; Kefalabaha/Kewin; Morning Market (Leka); Ikpakapit Town Hall; Total Round About; Opposite Lekatina's Compound; Near Uket Eno's Compound; Yenon Play Ground; Fano Hospital By Obimbang Street
Yakurr	Inyima	Ekpeti Town Hall; Ekpeti Primary School; Town Hall Assiga Beach; Ekpoto Town Hall; Primary School, Inyima; Inyima Town Hall; Ekpati Town Hall
Yakurr	Mkpani/Agoi	Pcn Primary School, Akugom; Aduma Town Hall; Ebirebit Primary School; Ekamasai Town Hall; Akugom Town Hall; Lebolkon Play Ground; Near Chief Compound; Ekamasai Near Chief Asuquo's Compound; Afaben Town Hall; Primary School No. I. Mkpani; In Front Of Lukpal Eteng; Primary School, Lokpoi; Lebang Play Ground; Obioko Play Ground; Ajere Play Ground; Ajere Town Hall; Kokomkpol Play Ground; R. C. M. Primary School Ajere; Primary School, Agoi Kibami; Motor Park; Ikpari Health Centre; Itu Agoi Play Ground; Ayoyoa St. Michael's Primary School; Congo Play Ground; Primary School, Abana Kpai; Akarukpat Town Hall; Agoi Ekpo Play Ground; Ijiman Town Hall; Primary School, Ekom Agoi; Chief Eno Eteng's Rice Mill; Community Primary School, Aduma
Yakurr	Abanakpai	Pcn Junet, Ikom/Cal. Road; Nsobo/Mbono II Road Junction; New Culvert Near Ekwe's Compound; Beside Ikom/Cal. Road Ekpon; Abanakpai Play Ground; Lekomkapil Town Hall; Pcn. Primary School, New Block; Community Secondary School, Nko; Near Ikum House
Yakurr	Nkpolo/Ukpawen	Lekamkom; Ukpawen Play Ground; Agoi Ekpo Road, Letekom; Opposite Pcn. Agoi Road; Mkpolo Play Ground; St. Pius Primary School, Nko; Nko Town Hall
Yakurr	Ntan	Kekonkolo Town Hall; Afuafua Town Hall; Atakpa Town Hall; Ngem Town Hall; Pcn Primary School, Ekon; Road Junction, Ntan Ekori; Akugom II, Ntan
Yala	Echumofana	Primary School, Akreha; Playground Echiakpu; Playground, Ipuole Ekprinyi; Igbeku Comprehensive Secondary School 004; Play Ground Echumofana Etiekpo; Play Ground Iluaje By Town Hall Front; Primary School, Echumofana; Play Ground Oloko Ipuole Street; By Chief Ogbeche Ipuole's Street; Primary School Echumoga; Play Ground, Omgbule; By Chief Awoko Ipuole, Street; Igbeku Comprehensive Secondary School; Play Ground, Imaje
Yala	Gabu	Playground, Oturkpo; Playground Adikpe Middle; Playground, Oke Ijaku; Primary School Uturkpa; St. Patrick's Primary School; Primary School Uturkpo; Play Ground, Ega-Ette; Play Ground Oturkpo
Yala	Ijiraga	Primary School, Wanudu; Playground Ngomo; Playground, Adum; Primary School Ijiraga; Play Ground Abenta; Play Ground Ujigam; Play Ground, Bituol; Primary School Wanudu
Yala	Ntrigom/Mfuma	Primary School, Ijigbeji; Playground Elu Ijikom; Opposite Benekaba; Market Square Okpodon; Play Ground Nkaleke; By The Left Of Abuon; Primary School, Akumenyi; Play Ground, Nduogoni; Play Ground, Elu; Bitutum Town Hall; Primary School, Mfuma; Play Ground Ndubia; Ekpa Eba's Street; Play Ground, Ujama; Primary School Ogomogomo
Yala	Okpoma	Primary School, Anyeko Itekpa; Primary School Anyeko Iyeche; By Odey Auotuo's Street; Play Ground Okpodu; Primary School Olachor; By Ogar Omagu's Street; Primary School, Adiero; Play Ground Idigbo; Primary School, Itega-Ekpudu; By Oko Ipuole Street; By Thompson Ejeh Street; Play Ground, Omari Oba; Playground Okache; Primary School, Ijama; Play Ground Adeni; Otuche By Old Dispensary; Idiku By Iyeje Street; Odey Iyaji Street; By Onah Odey Street; By Peter Iyaji Street; By Alaga Street; Play Ground, Abachor; By Baptist Premises; Primary School Ijama
Yala	Okuku	By Wona Eba Street; By Odey Ipuole Street; St. Joseph Primary School Okuku I; St. Joseph Primary School Okuku II; St. Joseph Primary School Okuku III; Play Ground Anyeko; By Fidelis Ogbudu's Street; By Odida Achoda Street; By Odey Odama Street; By Ijakpa's Street; Mary Knoll College; Convent Primary School; St. Joseph Primary School Okuku IV; St. Joseph Primary School Okuku V; St. Joseph Primary School Okuku VI; By Ekpo's Street; By Ogar Ogbadu's Street; By Gregory Iji's Street; By Lawrence Okonu's Street; By Oluohu Odey's Street; By Igogo Odey's Street; Play Ground, Ugaga; By Odadu's Street; Convent Primary School, Ugaga; Playground Ikpachor; By Ibu Ipuole's Street; Play Ground Igbekurikor
Yala	Wanihem	Playground, Uzaga; Town Hall Ezekobe; Play Ground Obat; Play Ground Adum; Play Ground Okah Idah; Play Ground Igbo; Play Ground, Okalaka; Play Ground Okpinya; Play Ground, Ekpotom; Play Ground Liokom; Play Ground, Omachi; Play Ground Allu I; Play Ground Allu II; Play Ground, Idum; Play Ground, Adum (Market Square); Town Hall Ezekobo
Yala	Wanikade	Primary School, Uzenyi; Market Square, Ibenta; Maternity Premises Ibenta; Play Ground Wanikade; Play Ground Uzenyor; Elehen Town Hall; Play Ground, Elahen; By Okpokpo's Street; Primary School, Uchenyi; Play Ground Item; Play Ground, Lema; Play Ground Iwango; Primary School Bitol; Play Ground, Wanikade
Yala	Wanakom	Primary School, Wanakom; Play Ground Uhakilu; Primary School Wanakom; Play Ground Ngidi; Play Ground Wanikpe; Right Side Of Idum Street; Play Ground, Okpaka; Play Ground, Ogenga; Primary School, Igbobia; Playground, Usaluma Middle; Playground Ezekwe; Playground, Ehaha; Play Ground Ibila; St. Kirean Primary School Operiku; Play Ground Enucha; Town Hall, Okpodan; Play Ground By Abeokuta Junction; Play Ground, Ezekwe
Yala	Yache	Osina By Ogar Ogbaka Street; Play Ground Mbuo Alifokpa; Opposite Police Station; Play Ground Ekplor; Primary School Alifokpa I; Primary School Alifokpa II; Primary School, Alifokpa III; Play Ground, Alalina; Primary School, Achuora; Primary School Wonye; Primary School Uchu; Play Ground Ijegu I; Play Ground Ijegu II; Play Groun, D Ijegu; Play Ground, Egraluji; Primary School, Alifokpa; Primary School Achuora
Yala	Yahe	Playground, Ochelebe; Lutheran Hospital Gate; By Ogbaji Inakwu Street; Bansara Road Junction; Hausa Quarters; Primary School Ochumode; By Alo Okwoche's Street; Play Ground, Oko Odey; Play Ground, Ogbenha; By Andrew Oji Street; Play Ground Ebo; Woleche Ebo; Play Ground Afe Adoga; Play Ground Otuche Ekula
