= Asuquo =

Asuquo may refer to:

== People ==
=== First name ===
- Asuquo Effiong (born 1962), Nigerian politician
- Asuquo Ekpe (?-2016), Nigerian international footballer
- Asuquo Ekpenyong (born 1985), Nigerian politician

=== Surname ===
- Bassey Asuquo, Nigerian soldier
- Cobhams Asuquo (born 1981), Nigerian musician
- Daniel Effiong Asuquo (born 1962), Nigerian politician
- Tony Ene Asuquo (1966–2006), Leader of the Bakassi Movement for Self-Determination
