= Bahumono people =

Bahumono
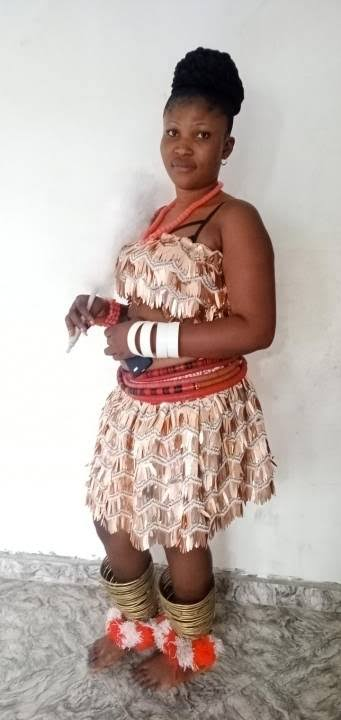
- Ohumono traditional dancer

Total population
- 58,000 (1989, est)

Regions with significant populations
- Abi, Cross River
- Nigeria: 58,000

Languages
- Kohumono

Religion
- Christianity, Traditional African religions

Related ethnic groups
- Yakurr, Efik, Orring people, Igbo people, Ekoi people, Biase and Anang

Humono
- Person: Òhúmónò
- People: Bahumono
- Language: Kohumono

The Bahumono (Ehumono, Kohumono) are a southeastern Nigerian ethnic group that primarily resides in the Abi local government area of Cross River State. They are the largest ethnic group in the region.

They speak the Humono language, or Kohumono.

== History ==
The Bahumono live along the Cross River, but according to Bahumono tradition and folklore, the group migrated from Hotumusa. Hotumusa, is the land where the rock Ekpon á Rara is located. And it is that land, the Bahumono consider their spiritual and ancestral homeland.

During the colonial era, the Bahumono opposed the laws of the British Empire. The Bahumono, alongside other upper Cross River tribes, foiled the Cross River expeditions of 1895, 1896 and 1898. These particular efforts resulted in the deaths of several British personnel.

The Bahumono were once part of the Aro Confederacy although, as of now, the tribe consists of eight villages: Ebijakara (Ebriba), Ebom, Ediba, Usumutong, Anong, Igonigoni, Afafanyi, and Abeugo. They are closely related to the Efik, Waawa, Yakurr, Akunakuna, Ekoi people, and Annang people.

== Culture and tradition ==
Ohumono culture and tradition shares similarities with neighboring communities. Individuals trace their origin and ancestry through the Eshi which literally means womb or navel, people from the same eshi are considered as brothers and sisters and will trace their origin to the same father and mother similar to the Ananng people. Apart from the Eshi, villages are further divided into Rovone.

The practice of the Ekpe secret society and fattening room is widely observed while few people practice Ohumono religion.

=== Festivals ===
Major Ohumono festivals include:

- Rathobai;
- Afu wrestling festival;
- Masquerade parade;
- Oboko;
- The annual Humono festival;
- The traditional boat racing challenge;
- Obam.

=== Cuisine ===
Traditional Ohumono food is similar to that of the Efik, Igbo and other Cross River communities. Major dishes include:

- Fufu;
- Okho (Oha) soup;
- Edikang Ikong;
- Ehkpan.

== See also ==
- Usumutong
- Ebijakara
- Ediba
