= John Gaul Lebo =

Nigerian politician (born 1972)

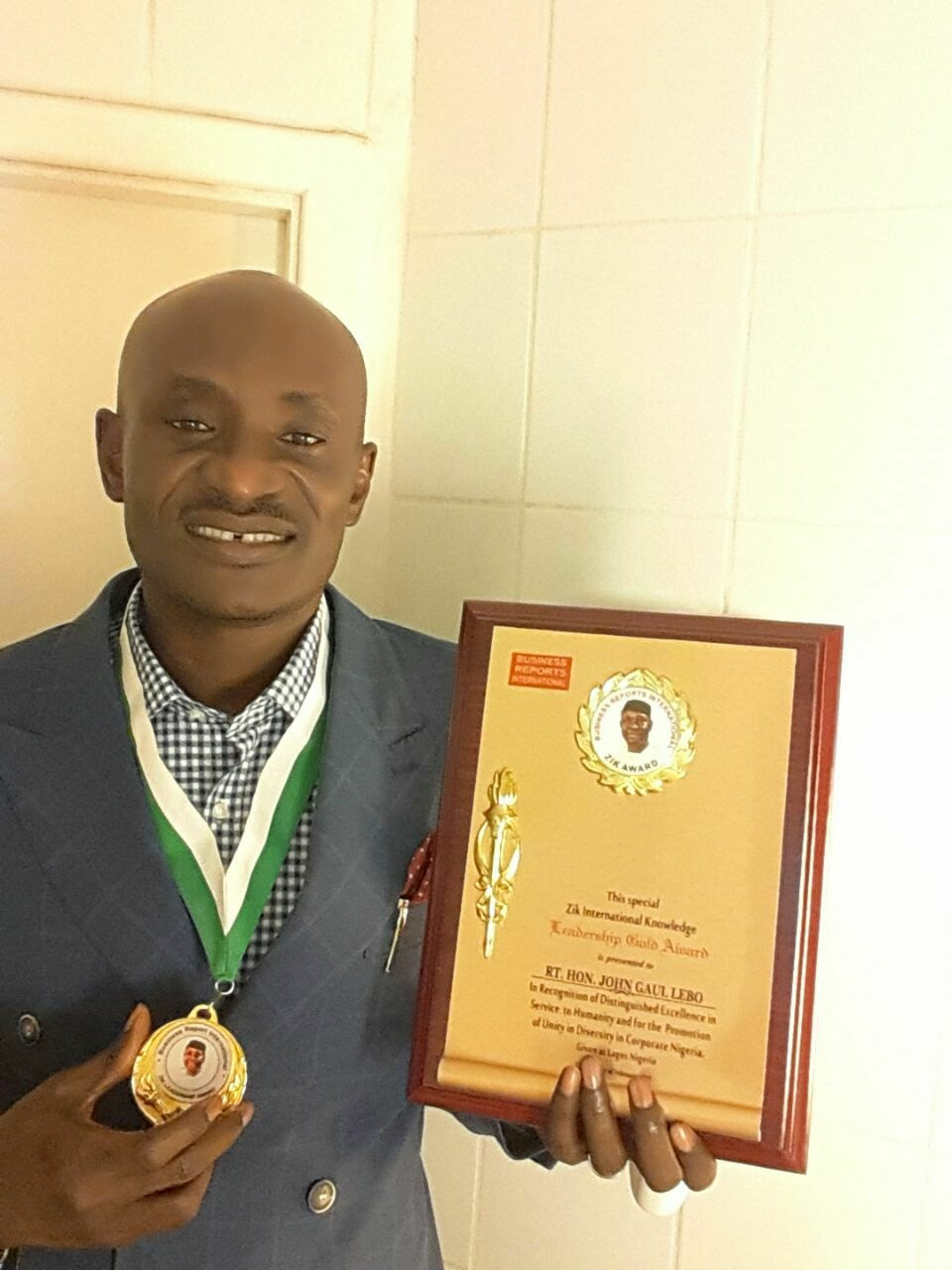
- Lebo in 2017

Speaker of the Cross River State House of Assembly
- Constituency: Abi State Constituency
- In office June 2011 – June 2019

Personal details
- Born: 15 March 1972 (age 54)
- Spouse: Barr. Binta Gaul Lebo
- Education: University of Calabar; Calabar; Nigeria
- Occupation: State legislator
- Profession: Lawyer

John Gaul Lebo (born 15 March 1972) is a Nigerian lawyer and former member of the Cross River State House of Assembly. He is affiliated with the People's Democratic Party (PDP) and has been active in legislative duties and public service within Cross River State.

== Education ==
Lebo qualified as a Barrister at Law and Solicitor of the Supreme Court of Nigeria in 1998. He holds qualifications in business and law from Regenesys Business School, the Institute of Parliamentary and Political Law. Lebo lectured in law at the University of Abuja and served as the managing editor of Law Reports of Nigeria.

== Political career ==
Lebo was elected as Speaker of the Cross River State House of Assembly on 10 June 2015. He served as the pioneer chairman of the People's Democratic Party (Nigeria), Speakers' Forum and Secretary of the Speakers' Forum Ad-Hoc Committee on the constitutional amendment of Nigeria.

On 10 May 2024, Lebo had announced his departure from the PDP, according to a letter addressed to the ward chairman of the party in Adadama Council Ward, Adadama, Abi local government area of Cross River State.

== Legislative career ==
Lebo represented Cross River State at international forums, including the 46th Commonwealth Parliamentary Association African Region Meeting in Nairobi (2015), the United Nations General Assembly in New York (February 2015), the Marrakech Climate Change Conference (COP22) in November 2016, and the World Government Summit in Dubai (February 2017).

== Honors and awards ==
In February 2017, Lebo received an award from the Ghana Civilian Institute of Administration. He participated in the 5th session of the World Government Summit and received the Nnamdi Azikiwe Zik Prize for best state legislature leadership in Nigeria in 2017.
