= Legbo =

Legbo may be,

- Legbo language
- Idris Legbo Kutigi
