= GBO =

GBO may refer to:

- Game Boy Original, a Nintendo handheld game console
- Gbo language (ISO 639-3: agb), a Cross River language of Nigeria
- Get Britain Out, a British Eurosceptic organisation
- The Graham Bond Organisation, a British music group
- Green Bank Observatory, a radio astronomy observatory in Green Bank, West Virginia
- Northern Grebo language (ISO 639-3: gbo), a Kru language of Liberia
- Nationality code of British Overseas Citizen in the machine-readable passport
- Growth buyout, a form of corporate acquisition
