= Ediba =

Village in Cross River State, Nigeria

- Village
- Interactive map of Ediba
- Country: Nigeria
- State: Cross River
- Local Government Area: Abi, Cross River

Ediba is a village in Abi local government area of Cross River State, Nigeria.

This place is situated in Abi, Cross River, Nigeria, its geographical coordinates are 5° 52' 0" North, 8° 1' 0" East and its original name (with diacritics) is Ediba.

The Ediba people speak Bahumono language.

Ediba has several wards which includes: Barracks, Enihom, Enusokwe, Enobom, Enugwehuma and Ezono.

Ediba is bordered on its four sides by Itigidi, Afafanyi, Anong and Usumutong.

The Village is headed by its Traditional Ruler, Ovai Uvara Imong Anani who ascended the throne in 2016. The former chairman of Abi Local Government Area, Farathor Robinson hails from the community. Being a riverine area, Ediba happens to be one of the communities missionaries first got their way to in Nigeria, but up till this moment (April 16, 2023), the area lacks basic facilities such as banks, libraries, tertiary institutions, and a lot of other basic amenities and infrastructure needed for day-to-day life. Before the communal crisis in 2014 over a land dispute, the state government had plans of constructing a ring road around Bahumono that would have run through all the villages. The project was abandoned and never completed. Few years after peace was restored, a sign post was brought signalling the completion of the road. The Cross River State Government was called upon intervene on the matter, but they are yet to respond.

Ediba people originated from a place called Otumusa, after successfully sending the former occupants "Itigidis" away through a commando style led by her famous warrior Ovai Ikereku in the early 1700s.

The community was one of the first villages to witness civilization and the coming of the white man into Nigeria. The white men who brought and established JohnHolts Construction Limited, built one of the first magnificent buildings at the time known as the Enyong'Arakpa in Enobom.

Ediba was the first transportation routes linking Cross River State and Eastern Nigeria through the Royor. The Government then had to produce the pontum "small ship" used for crossing the Ediba river called 'royor'.

The first Magnificent Mansions in Cross River State was built by Engr John Okon Egbe along Edanafa school road. People from all over Nigeria used to come here to take pictures especially during societal weddings and other big ceremonies.

Resorts in Ediba include the ogwa, ikpata azzeh, the Royor, Ujani, Eruwa.

There are three secondary schools in Ediba, two of these schools are privately owned while the third is owned by the government.

1. Enugwehuma Comprehensive college, Ediba.

2. Torti Memorial Nursery, Primary and Secondary School Enusokwe - Ediba.

3. Edanafa secondary commercial school, Ediba
