= Ebijakara =

Village in Cross River State, Nigeria

Ebijakara Ebriba
- Village
- Ebijakara
- Ebijakara, Cross River State, Nigeria
- Coordinates: 5°50′56″N 7°58′04″E
- Country: Nigeria
- State: Cross River State
- Local Government Area: Abi, Cross River

Ebijakara is a community in Abi local government area of Cross River State, Nigeria.

== History ==
Ebijakara is one of the original seven villages which form the Bahumono nation and they migrated from Hotumusa along with other Bahumono communities.

== Communal war ==
There have been a series of communal wars and conflicts in the area between them and the neighboring Ebom community.
