= Akunakuna =

Ethnic Group of Nigeria and Cameroon

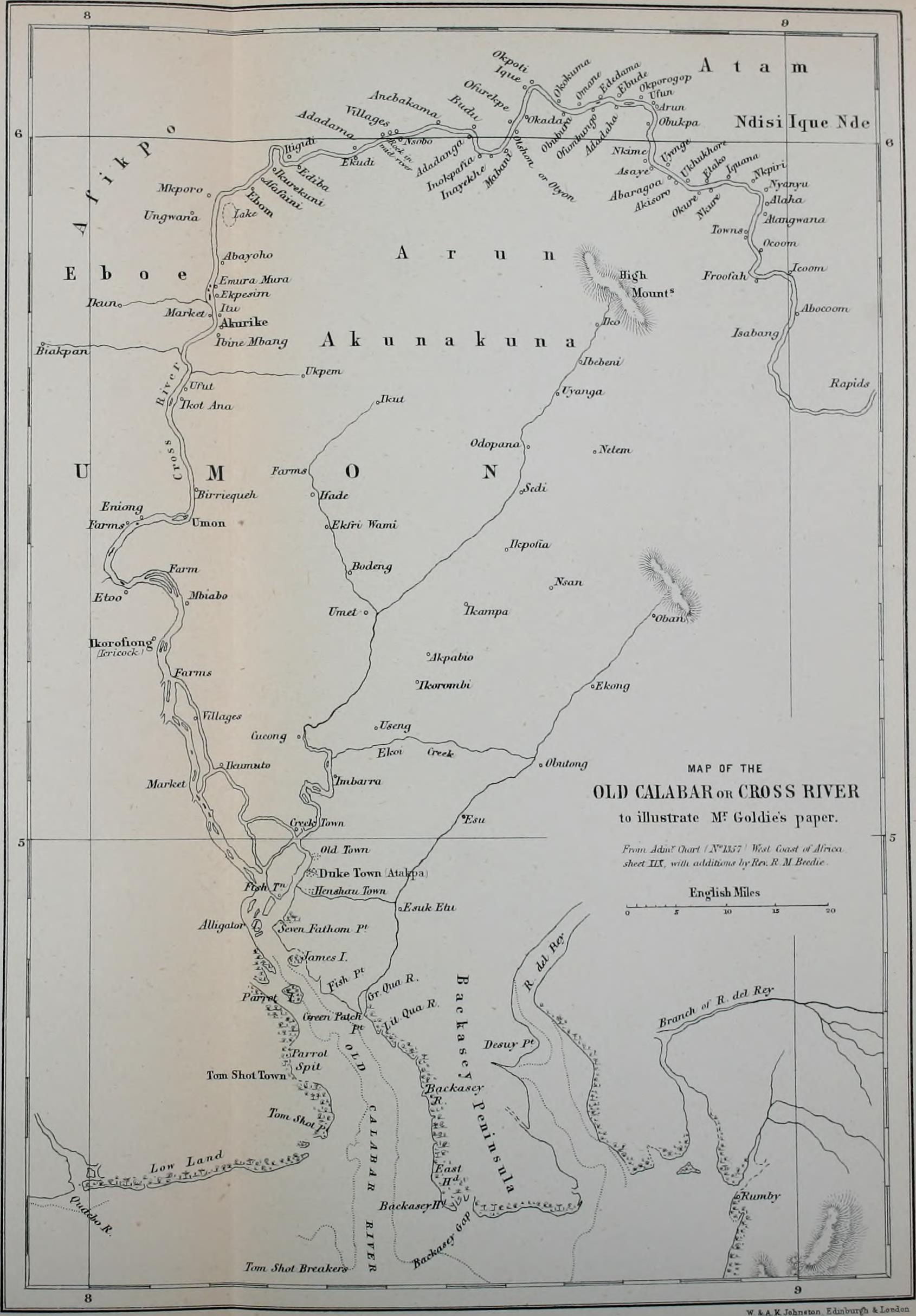
The area of the Cross River where the Akunakuna people live (as of 1885)

The agwaGwunɛ are an ethnic group of Nigeria and Cameroon, closely related to the Efik, Bahumono, Korring and Ibibio people, mostly inhabiting the area around the Cross River. Recent figures have indicated there are over three hundred fifty thousand agwaGwunɛ people.

== History ==
In 1846, the Umon attacked some agwaGwunɛ canoes on the Cross River that were going to trade with the Efik, who had previously traded for European luxury goods. This was used by the agwaGwunɛ as a Casus Belli to go to war with the Umon. Though the war lasted for years, the agwaGwunɛ eventually lost. Under the negotiation of the Efik, the result was as follows, the agwaGwunɛ had to pay an annual tribute to the king of Umon, in return for "keeping peace over the river". In 1888, a treaty was written with agwaGwunɛ leaders giving the British full control to their land.
