= Akanefore =

- Village
- Interactive map of Akanefore
- Coordinates: 5°51′14.933″N 8°0′32.011″E
- Country: Nigeria
- State: Cross River
- Local Government Area: Abi, Cross River

Akanefore is a village in Abi local government area of Cross River State, Nigeria.
