= Akparavuni =

- Village
- Akparavuni
- Interactive map of Akparavuni
- Coordinates: 5°32′39.250″N 8°7′18.944″E
- Country: Nigeria
- State: Cross River State
- Local Government Area: Biase

Akparavuni is a community in Biase local government area of Cross River State, Nigeria.
