= Anona, Cross River State =

Anona
- Village
- Interactive map of Anona
- Country: Nigeria
- State: Cross River
- Local Government Area: Abi, Cross River

Anona is a village in Abi local government area of Cross River State, Nigeria.
