= Samuel Eson Johnson Ecoma =

His Lordship, Honourable Justice Samuel Eson Johnson Ecoma

Chief Judge of Cross River State
- In office 11 March 1990 – 29 November 1995
- Preceded by: Hon. Justice Edem I. Kooffreh
- Succeeded by: Hon. Justice Etowa E. Arikpo

Personal details
- Born: 29 November 1930 Itigidi, Abi Local Government Area, Cross River State, Nigeria
- Died: 30 August 1999 (aged 68)
- Spouse: Professor Chinyere Samuel Ecoma
- Education: North Western Polytechnic; University College London

Samuel Eson Johnson Ecoma (29 November 1930 – 30 August 1999) was a Nigerian jurist and the Chief Judge of Cross River State appointed in March 1990. He was called to the English Bar in June, 1961 and to the Nigerian Bar in August 1963.

== Background ==
His Lordship, Hon. Justice Samuel Eson Johnson Ecoma (aka Hon. Justice S. E. J. Ecoma), born in Itigidi, Abi Local Government Area of Cross River State, Nigeria, was the first legal practitioner from Itigidi. He was baptised and confirmed in the Presbyterian Church of Nigeria, and attended several schools due to the frequent transfer of his father- Mr. Eson Johnson Ecoma- who was a Police Officer and who served in Calabar and other stations of the Old Calabar Province and other places outside Calabar Province viz: Duke Town Primary School, Calabar; Government Primary School, Eket; Umuda Isingwu Methodist School, Umuahia; Aggrey Memorial College, Arochukwu; Duke Town Secondary School, Calabar; and Excelsior Evening School, Calabar.

His Lordship also attended North Western Polytechnic, Kentish Town, London where he read for his General Certificate of Education at the Advanced Level before gaining admission into University College London as an internal student to read Law. During this relevant period, he also enrolled in the Honourable Society of Gray's Inn. His Lordship was called to the English Bar in June, 1961.

== Career ==
His Lordship returned to Nigeria in August, 1963 and set up a lucrative private legal practice at Enugu, which practice took him all over the then Eastern Region of Nigeria. He later shifted his base to Abakaliki until the Civil War broke out and was compelled to flee Abakaliki to Afikpo, to Okigwe and to Mbano where he remained until January, 1970 when the Civil War ended.

After the Nigerian Civil War in 1970, he returned to his home state, then known as the South Eastern State and was appointed a Civil Commissioner (Commissioner for Development Administration) in the then South Eastern State Executive Council in March, 1970 by Governor Brigadier U. J. Esuene. In March, 1972, he was appointed Commissioner for Law Revision and was posted to the Ministry of Justice. He held that post for barely a year when in March, 1973, he was appointed a Judge of the High Court of South Eastern State. On 11 March 1990, he was appointed Chief Judge of Cross River State, a post he held until he retired on 29 November 1995.

During the period he held the post of a Judge, he also served in Tribunals, namely: Member of the Commission of Inquiry into the Nigerian Ports Authority (NPA) Catwalk Disaster- November/ December 1972; 9 June 1977- name placed on the list of Arbitrators of the International Centre for Settlement of Investment Disputes based in Washington, D.C., United States of America; Election Tribunal No. 3 Kaduna State during the 1979 General Elections; Sole Commissioner of Inquiry into Njua Bano/Odajie Mbube and Kachuan Irruan/ Idum Mbube Disputes 1984; Chairman, Commission of Inquiry into Cross River State Agricultural Development Corporation (ADC) 1985; June 1987- Re-appointment as an Arbitrator for the International Centre for Settlement of Investment Disputes based in Washington, D.C., United States of America, combining with them all the other responsibilities of a High Court Judge by opening Criminal Assizes and dealing with Civil Matters.

During the period that he was a Judge, His Lordship served at Ogoja from 1978 to 1979, Uyo from 1979 to 1983, and Ikom from 1983 to 1985 when he was posted back to Calabar. From 1985, he had acted as the Chief Judge three times (August 1987 to October 1987, 14 September to 14 November 1988, and from 10 January to 10 March 1990), and stood in three times (July 1984 to August 1984, August 1985 to September 1985, and August to September 1986).

To his achievements, His Lordship attended the following Conferences/Workshops at home and abroad, viz: All Nigeria Judges Conference in Lagos, 1974; All Nigeria Judges Conference in Lagos, 1978; All Nigeria Judges Conference in Ilorin, 1982; All Nigeria Judges Conference in Abuja, 1988; Judicial Lectures in 1989; Commonwealth Conference for Legal Personalities in Auckland, New Zealand, April 1990; Judicial Workshop in Calabar, May 1990; Judicial Workshop in Port Harcourt, 1991; Judicial Lectures in Enugu, October/November 1991; World Jurist Association Conference in Barcelona, Spain, October 1991; Judicial Workshop at Uyo, May/June 1992; (As a Delegate to the) National Seminar for State Legislators in Abuja, 29 June to 1 July 1992; 10th Commonwealth Conference in Nicosia, Cyprus, 3 May to 7 May 1993; and World Jurist Association 16th Biennial Conference in Manila, Philippines, 25 October to 30 October 1993.

His Lordship was one of the Judges from Cross River State appointed to tour United States of America Cities between June and July, 1981. During his period of service as Chief Judge of Cross River State, he also served in the following capacities: as a Bencher in the Council of Legal Education; as a Director of Nigerian Judicial Institute; as a Member of Advisory Judicial Committee; as a Member of the Screening Committee for Candidates to be called to the Nigerian Bar; and as a Member of the Committee for the Conferment of Senior Advocate of Nigeria.

During his tenure of office as a Chief Judge, more Judicial Divisions were created and brought the number to seven. Magisterial Districts were also increased and the Customary Courts were created to bring the number from 56 to 74. During his tenure also, four High Court Judges and a few magistrates were appointed.

== Hobbies ==
His Lordship was a keen and active participant in Lawn Tennis, and was an active member of the following recreation clubs: Ogoja Recreation Club; Uyo Recreation Club; and Ikom Recreation Club. He also played the organ proficiently and was a keen reader of novels.

== Posthumous awards ==
- Cross River State Government Medal of Honour- October 2005
- Ikom Recreation Club Meritorious Award- 2008

== Notes ==
- Gray's Inn. (1960). Graya: A Magazine for Members of Gray's Inn, Volume 11. London: Gray's Inn, page 131.
- Cross River State (Nigeria). (1986). Conclusions of the government of Cross River State of Nigeria on the report of the Commission on Inquiry into the Cross River State Agricultural Development Corporation (A.D.C.). Calabar: Government Printer, page 2.
- Africa Who's Who. (1981). London: Africa Journal Limited, page 360.
- Fawehinmi, G. (1988). Bench and Bar in Nigeria. Lagos: Nigerian Law Publications Ltd., pages 11, 93 (No. 338) and 700 (No. 3827).
- Fawehinmi, G. (1992). Courts' System in Nigeria- A Guide [1992]. Lagos: Nigerian Law Publications Ltd., pages 311, 312 and 314.
