= Asuquo Effiong =

Nigerian politician

Daniel Effiong Asuquo (born June 4, 1962) is a Nigerian politician who has represented the Akamkpa / Biase Federal Constituency of Cross River State in the 8th and 9th National House of Representatives.He is a member of the People's Democratic Party (PDP).
