= Epenti =

Village in Cross River State, Nigeria

- Village
- Interactive map of Epenti
- Country: Nigeria
- State: Cross River
- Local Government Area: Abi, Cross River

Epenti is a village in Abi local government area of Cross River State, Nigeria.
