= Alex Egbona =

Nigerian politician

Alex Egbona (born October 15, 1964) is a Nigerian politician. He is a member of the Nigerian Federal House of Representatives representing the Yakurr/Abi constituency in Cross River state. He was appointed special assistant, Special Duties to the then Governor of Cross River State and later appointed Deputy Chief of Staff and a member of the Cross River State Executive Council.

== Early life ==
Egbona was born on October 15, 1964, and raised in Agbara Ekureku. He attended primary school in the Abi Local Government area of the state. From 1975 to 1982, Egbona attended Agbo Comprehensive School. He obtained a Higher School certificate from the College of Arts and Science in Ogoja. In 1990, he obtained a graduate degree in Economics from the University of Port Harcourt and then completed his compulsory national service at Kaduna State.

In 1996, Egbona obtained a Master's Degree in Public Administration from the University of Calabar and also holds a Master's Degree in Educational Planning. In February 2014, he obtained a Doctor of Philosophy (PhD) degree in Educational Administration and Planning with Special Interest in Policy Formulation and Implementation from the University of Calabar.

== Career ==
Egbona served as Special Assistant to Donald Duke, the then Executive Governor of Cross River State from 2002 to 2003. He later served as Chief of Staff to Senator Liyel Imoke, the Executive Governor of Cross River State during the year 2007 to 2014.

Egbona won election for a second term in the National Assembly and serve as Member of the House of Representatives for the Yakurr/Abi constituency. Alex Egbona is presently the House of Representatives Committee Chairman on Specialty Healthcare
