= Agarabe =

- Village
- Interactive map of Agarabe
- Coordinates: 6.8361°N 7.2294°E
- Country: Nigeria
- State: Cross River
- Local Government Area: Abi

Agarabe is a village in Abi local government area of Cross River State, Nigeria.
