= Yenon, Cross River State =

Village in Cross River State, Nigeria

Yenon
- Village
- Interactive map of Yenon
- Country: Nigeria
- State: Cross River
- Local Government Area: Abi, Cross River

Yenon is a village in Abi local government area of Cross River State, Nigeria.
