= Itigidi =

Settlement in Cross River, Nigeria

Coordinates: 5°53′31″N 8°01′18″E

Itigidi is a settlement in Abi Local government area in Cross River State, Nigeria. Calabar, the capital of Cross River State, is approximately 109 kilometres (68 mi) from Itigidi. Itigidi and Abuja, the capital of Nigeria, are separated by around 356 kilometres (221 mi).

== Climate ==
In Itigidi, the wet season is warm, oppressive, and overcast and the dry season is hot, muggy, and partly cloudy. Over the course of the year, the temperature typically varies from 19 °C (67 °F) to 31 °C (88 °F) and is rarely below 16 °C (60 °F) or above 33 °C (91 °F).

== Hospital ==
Among the hospital in Itigidi are;

- Eja memorial joint hospital Itigidi

== School ==
Among the school in Itigidi are;

- Cross River State School of Nursing Itigidi
- College of Nursing Itigidi
- Community Secondary School, Itigidi
