= Tony Ene Asuquo =

Nigerian politician

Chief Tony Ene Asuquo

Leader of the Bakassi Movement for Self-Determination
- In office 2006–2006

Personal details
- Born: 1966
- Died: 15 August 2006 Near Calabar, Cross River State, Nigeria
- Occupation: Politician

Chief Tony Ene Asuquo (1966 – August 18, 2006, near Calabar, Cross River State) was a leader of the Bakassi Movement for Self-Determination, which sought the independence of Bakassi.

== Life and career ==
He came to international knowledge after his group announced its intention on August 6, 2006, to seek the independence of Bakassi from Nigeria, which had recently lost an International Court of Justice case over the territory to Cameroon and was preparing, under then-president Olusegun Obasanjo, to hand over control of the territory to the Cameroonian military per the Greentree Agreement.

Prior to his death, Ene challenged the Green Tree Agreement in a Supreme Court case which listed him alongside 6 others - Chief Orok Eneyo, Chief Emmanuel Effiong Etene, Ndabu Eyo Umo Nakanda, Emmanuel Okokon Asuquo, Ita Okon Nyong, and Richard Ekpenyong - as plaintiffs. The court case was won by the plaintiffs, but the federal government of Nigeria refused to recognize the judgment.

== Death ==
Ene died on August 15, 2006, en route to Calabar in a car accident in which 21 people, including Ene, died; he was travelling the Calabar-Itu road to petition to the state government of Cross Rivers for the release of Richard Ekpenyong, who was being detained by the State Security Service on the orders of then-governor Donald Duke.
