= Usumutong =

Village in Cross River State, Nigeria

Usumutong Ekpokan Ibenda(Ekpokan udobi)
- Village
- Interactive map of Usumutong
- Country: Nigeria
- State: Cross River
- Local Government Area: Abi, Cross River

Usumutong is a community situated in Abi local government area of Cross River State, Nigeria.

They are from the Bahumono ethnic group and they speak the Kohumono language
