= Lekpankom =

Village in Cross River State, Nigeria

- Village
- Interactive map of Lekpankom
- Country: Nigeria
- State: Cross River
- Local Government Area: Abi, Cross River

Lekpankom is a village in the Abi local government area of Cross River State, Nigeria.
