= Eno-Evong =

Village in Cross River State, Nigeria

- Village
- Interactive map of Eno-Evong
- Country: Nigeria
- State: Cross River
- Local Government Area: Abi, Cross River

Eno-Evong is a village in Abi local government area of Cross River State, Nigeria.
