= Bakassi Movement for Self-Determination =

Militant organization

Flag of the Democratic Republic of Bakassi, as proposed by BAMOSD

The Bakassi Movement for Self-Determination (BAMOSD) is a militant organization that seeks for the independence of Bakassi, a territory of Cameroon and formation of the Democratic Republic of Bakassi. The movement played a leading role in the Bakassi conflict.

== History ==
According to an email sent by Sive Ogan, a member of BAMOSD, the decision to declare secession from Nigeria was taken at a meeting in Yenagoa, Bayelsa State on 2 July 2006.

It has made two declarations of independence since its foundation in 2006: one on 2 August 2006 in light of the Greentree Agreement between Nigeria and Cameroon, and another one on 31 July 2008 (two days less than two years after the first declaration of independence). In the latter declaration, Akwa Obutong was declared the capital of the republic.

One of the first leaders of the organization, Tony Ene Asuquo, died less than a month after the first declaration of independence in a mysterious car accident.

== Support and affiliations ==
It has been indicated in both Nigerian and Cameroonian media that the BAMOSD is backed by the militant MEND movement, which opposes the federal government and the predominant petroleum industry in the Niger Delta, and the SCAPO, which seeks independence for the nearby Southern Cameroons as the Republic of Ambazonia.

== Actions ==
On 31 October 2008, gunmen in speedboats kidnapped and threatened to kill 10 crew members from French offshore service vessel (OSV) "Bourbon Sagitta" near the Bakassi Peninsula. The vessel's owners said those taken hostage were seven French nationals, two Cameroonians and a Tunisian. A group called Bakassi Freedom Fighters has claimed to have carried out the attack.

The leader of the group Ebi Dari told the BBC's Randy Joe Sa'ah in Cameroon that the Cameroonian government has seven days to enter into dialogue. He said the government had been warned many months ago that there would be no peace in Bakassi if it did not talk with the Bakassi Freedom Fighters. He said the group opposed the secession of the oil-rich Bakassi Peninsula to Cameroon from Nigeria.

Reuters news agency reported that the attack had been carried out jointly with a second group called Niger Delta Defence and Security Council (NDDSC).

On 5 November 2008, the commander of the militant group, Ebi Dari confirmed that one of the French hostages under its custody was killed in a failed rescue bid by Cameroonian soldiers. However, then it was reported that the seafarer reported killed was still alive.

On 5 November 2008 Groupe Bourbon announced that all its 10 crew members had been released.
