= Akpoha, Cross River State =

Akpoha Igbo
- Village
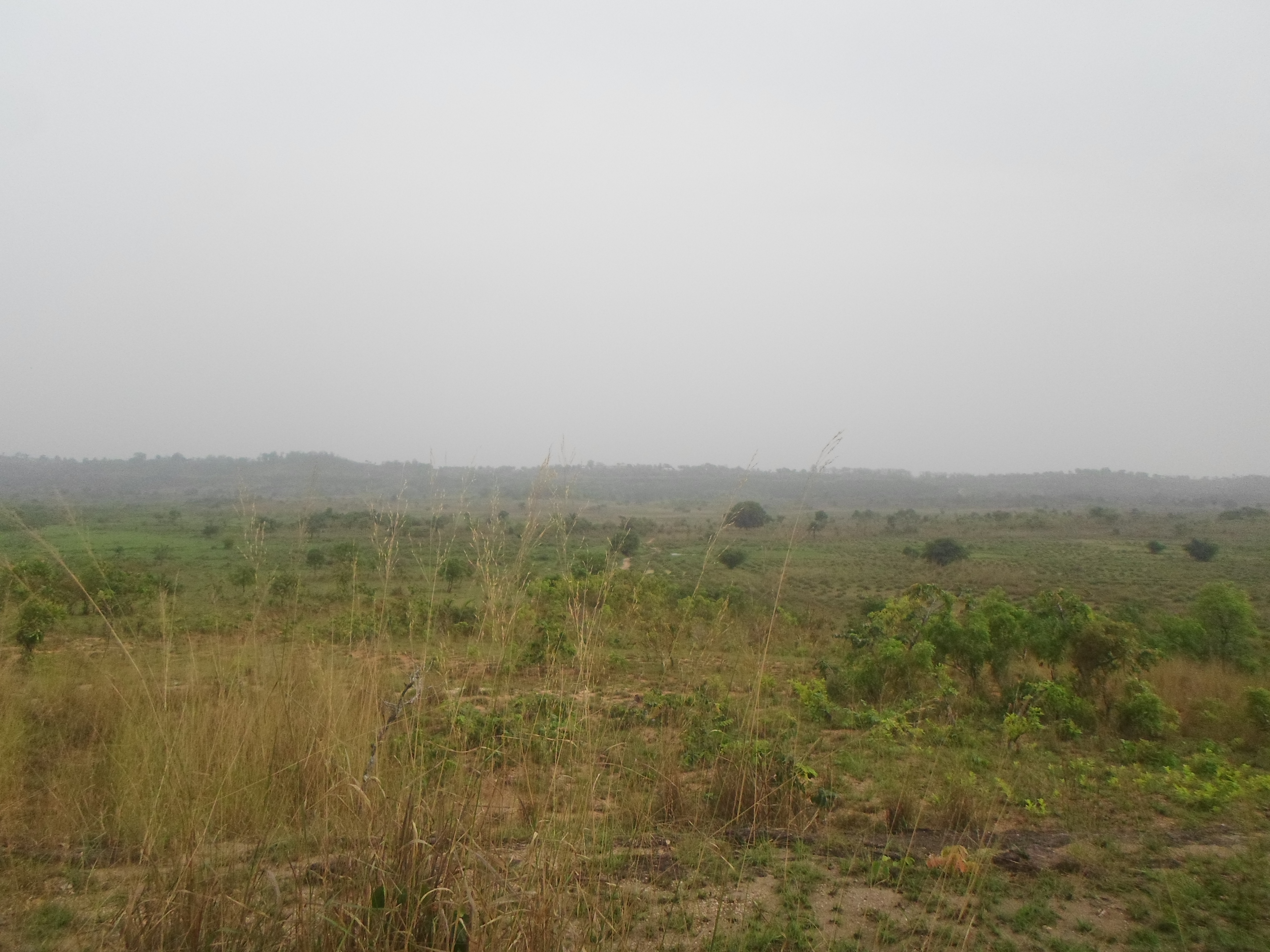
- skyline/landscape of Akpoha
- Nickname: City on the rock
- Interactive map of Akpoha
- Coordinates: 5°58′19.7″N 7°56′51.7″E
- Country: Nigeria
- State: Ebobyi
- Local Government Area: Afikpo, Ebonyi

Akpoha is a village in Afikpo local government area of Ebonyi State, Nigeria. It lies between the border of Ebonyi State and Cross River State.
