= Humono language =

Cross River language spoken in Nigeria

Humono
- Kohumono
- Native to: Nigeria
- Region: Cross River State
- Ethnicity: Bahumono
- Native speakers: (30,000 cited 1989)
- Language family: Niger–Congo?: Atlantic–Congo; Benue–Congo; Cross River; Upper Cross; Central; North–South; Ubaghara–Ohumono; Humono

Language codes
- ISO 639-3: bcs
- Glottolog: kohu1244

Humono
- Person: Òhúmónò
- People: Bahumono
- Language: Kohumono

The Humono language, Kohumono, is a Central Cross River language of Nigeria spoken by the Bahumono people in Abi Local Government Area of Cross River State.
