= Gbo language =

Upper Cross River language of Nigeria

Legbo
- Legbo
- Legbo
- Native to: Nigeria
- Region: Cross River State, Ebonyi State
- Ethnicity: Agbo
- Native speakers: (60,000 cited 1989)
- Language family: Niger–Congo?: Atlantic–Congo; Benue–Congo; Cross River; Upper Cross; Central; East–West; Mbembe–Legbo; Legbo

Language codes
- ISO 639-3: agb
- Glottolog: legb1242

Gbo
- People: Agbo
- Language: Legbo

The Legbo language, is spoken by Agbo people in Abi Local Government Area of Cross River State, Nigeria. It's is spoken by Ekureku, Itigidi, Adadama and Imabana people. Abi Local Government however also have another language known as "Omono" spoken by the "Bahumonos". Legbo and Omono are two different languages but found within the same Local Government.

According to Oral and fragments of documents, Ekureku people are the bedrock of Legbo language.
