= Afafanyi =

- Village
- Interactive map of Afafanyi
- Coordinates: 5.8739°N 7.9868°E
- Country: Nigeria
- State: Cross River
- Local Government Area: Abi, Cross River

Afafanyi is a village in Abi local government area of Cross River State, Nigeria.
