= Abi, Cross River State =

Abi
- LGA
- Interactive map of Abi
- Coordinates: 5.8358°N 7.9778°E
- Country: Nigeria
- State: Cross River State
- Local Government Headquarter: Itigidi

Government
  - Local Government Chairman: Egbala Bassey Egbala

Population (2006)
  - Total: 144,802
- Time zone: UTC+1 (WAT)
- Website: www.crossriverhub.com.ng/abi

Abi is a Local Government Area in Cross River State, Nigeria. It consists of several Agbo, Bahumono and Imabana villages and is home to an annual cultural festival.

== Geography ==
Abi is situated along the Cross River and it is bounded to the west by Ebonyi State, to the south by Biase Local Government Area and to the east by Yakurr Local Government Area.

== Subdivisions ==
Communes of Abi include:

- Abeugo
- Afafanyi
- Ebijakara
- Ediba
- Usumutong
- Ebom
- Bazowure
- Anong

== History and background ==
Most people from Abi come from the Bahumono tribe or Agbo subgroup of Igbo.

=== Bahumono ===
One of the largest tribes within Abi Local Government is Bahumono, which includes eight villages: Anong, Ediba, Usumutong, Abeugo, Afafanyi, Igonigoni, Ebom, and Ebijakara (Ebriba).

There are linguistic differences among the Bahumono people with the major variant being the Kohumono language.

They are all historically known to have migrated from a place within the hills of Ruhura (ekpon a ruhura) called Hotumusa (old town) which lies in a region between the present day Ediba and Usumutong, Ebijakara villages. The Ediba people at Hotumusa had hunters who found a riverine location where Ediba situates presently. The hunters related the news to her people and Ogbudene led the people in a siege against the locals of the river dwelling and drove them across the river. Four of Five of the Ediba families (Henugwehuma, Henusokwe, Enihom and Henuowom) quickly left and colonised the river area. The Ezono clan (made up of Bazorang, Batonene and Fonahini), the last family, decided to stay back at Hotumusa, where they had always been the head land owners and leading family among the other five. This small clan has had its own dynastic legacy, festivals, deities and new yam celebrations to this day.

=== Agbo ===
The first Itigidi man is said to have evolved from a tree which is secreting to the Itigidi man known to them as (Ekomoti). It is a huge tree that bears yellowish fruit and when eaten it taste sour. It is said that the Itigidi man was formed from that tree, the tree was said to have produced a mud-like substance on its bark which with time developed and hatched to a human-like figure. This human stayed and was nursed by the tree until he grew up and was able to fend for himself. He left the tree and started moving round the forest in search of food. He would eat wild fruits, berries, and whatever he thought was eatable. One day when he was exploring the forest he found himself by the tree where he evolved from, but this time he found another creature like him with slight difference in the feature. He took her and went out together to gather fruits and exploit the forest. They started procreating and formed a little village which they called the Lebama (Ekpolodol) otherwise known as the hill of mounds. That was how they came to existence, developed, and now the Itigidi community has come to stay. The tree remains sacred in the land of Itigidi. The tree is not used as fuel wood in Itigidi, dead wood of that tree is being used to create fence in the farms of the Itigidi man and his surroundings. It is believed that any young woman who burns that wood will not procreate, therefore it is only old women who are above the age of chilled bearing that can burn the wood or use as fuel.

== Climate ==
The climate of Abi is classified as savanna or tropical wet and dry. The district's annual temperature is 28.24 °C (82.83 °F), which is -1.22% colder than the average for Nigeria. Abi usually experiences 260.34 wet days (71.33% of the time) and 270.19 millimetres (10.64 inches) of precipitation every year.

== Languages ==
There are different languages spoken in the Abi local government, Kohumono, Agbo and Igbo are the most popular languages in the area.

| Village | Languages |
|---|---|
| Adadama | Kohumono |
| Afafanyi | Kohumono |
| Agarabe | Humono, Igbo |
| Akpoha | Igbo, Kohumono, Agbo |
| Anona | Gbo |
| Annong | Kohumono |
| Bazohure | Humono |
| Ebijakara | Kohumono |
| Eboronyi | Agbo, Igbo |
| Ebom | Kohumono |
| Egbizum | Kohumono |
| Ediba | Kohumono, Lokaa |
| Eno-Evong | Agbo, Igbo, Humono |
| Epenti | Kohumono, Agbo |
| Enwetiti | Kohumono |
| Igbo Ekureku | Agbo |
| Igbo Imabana | Agbo, Igbo |
| Igonigoni | Hohumono |
| Itigidi | Igbo, Agbo, Waawa |
| Leboikom | Agbo, Abanyom |
| Lekpankom | Agbo |
| Mkpanghi | Agbo |
| Ntankpo | Igbo, Agbo |
| Ofrekpe | Kohumono |
| Usumutong | Kohumono, Agwagune |
| Yenon | Kohumono |

== Notable people ==
- Samuel Eson Johnson Ecoma -Former Chief Judge of Cross River State.
- Betta Edu – Cross River State Commissioner for health
- Shan George -Nollywood Actress.
- Liyel Imoke -Former State Governor.
- John Gaul Lebo -Speaker State House of Assembly
- Alex Egbona -Honorable Member House of Representative for Abi/Yakurr Federal Constituency
