= Ntankpo =

Village in Cross River State, Nigeria

- Village
- Interactive map of Ntankpo
- Country: Nigeria
- State: Cross River
- Local Government Area: Yakurr

Area
  - Water: 3 km^{2} (1.2 sq mi)

Ntankpo is a village in Yakurr local government area of Cross River State, Nigeria. Water area is 3 km^{2} (1.2 sq mi; 740 acres)
