= Adadama =

- Village
- Adadama, Cross River State, Nigeria
- Coordinates: 5°55′40″N 8°04′9″E
- Country: Nigeria
- State: Cross River

Adadama is a village in Abi local government area of Cross River State, Nigeria.
