= Biase =

- LGA
- Interactive map of Biase
- Location within Nigeria
- Country: Nigeria
- State: Cross River State
- Capital: Akpet Central

Government
  - Local Government Chairman: Ada Charles Egwu

Area
  - Total: 1,310 km^{2} (510 sq mi)

Population (2006)
  - Total: 169,183
  - Density: 129/km^{2} (334/sq mi)
- Time zone: UTC+1 (WAT)
- Postal code: 542
- Website: www.crossriverhub.com.ng/biase

Biase is a Local Government Area of Cross River State, Nigeria. Its headquarters are in the town of Akpet Central. It has an area of 1,310 km^{2} and a population of 169,183 at the 2006 census.

The postal code of the area is 542.

== Geography and Economy ==
Biase LGA spans about 1,310 square kilometres or 510 square miles and experiences a humidity level of around 93%. The area’s average temperature is roughly 24 °C (75 °F), and its typical wind speed is about 13 km/h (8.1 mph). Biase is also home to numerous rivers and smaller water channels.

Biase LGA's economy heavily depends on fishing because the region has an abundance of seafood. With crops including banana, cashew, kolanut, oil palm, and yam being widely grown, farming is another important source of income for the locals. Biase LGA's economic development is also greatly aided by the existence of oil exploration companies that operate in and around the area. Additionally, commerce flourishes, with markets like the major Akpet market attracting a sizable number of traders and consumers each day.
