= Bakassi conflict =

Border conflict and separatist insurgencies in Cameroon

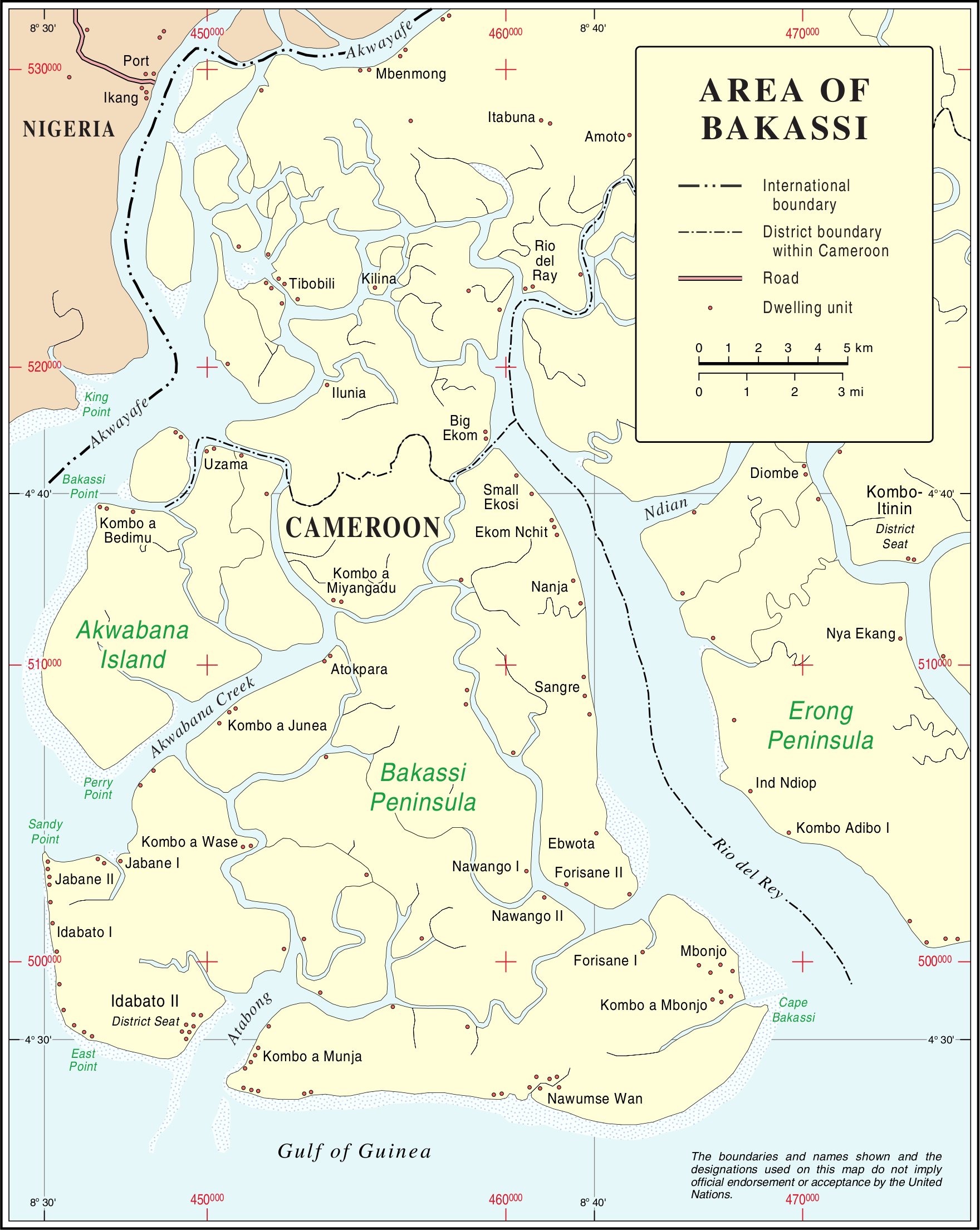
The Bakassi Peninsula in the Bight of Biafra

The Bakassi conflict is an ongoing armed dispute over the Bakassi Peninsula of Cameroon. Originally subject to a border conflict between Cameroon and Nigeria, Bakassi later became affected by insurgencies waged by local separatists against Cameroonian government forces.

After the independence of Cameroon and Nigeria the border between them was not settled and there were other disputes. The Nigerian government claimed the border was that prior to the British–German agreements in 1913, and Cameroon claimed the border laid down by the British–German agreements. The border dispute worsened in the 1980s and 1990s after some border incidents occurred, which almost caused a war between the two countries. In 1994 Cameroon went to the International Court of Justice (ICJ) to avoid war with Nigeria after many armed clashes occurred in the disputed regions. Eight years later the ICJ ruled in Cameroon's favour and confirmed the 1913 border made by the British and Germans as the international border between the two countries. Nigeria confirmed it would transfer Bakassi to Cameroon.

In June 2006 Nigeria signed the Greentree Agreement, which marked the formal transfer of authority in the region, and the Nigerian Army partly withdrew from Bakassi. The move was opposed by many Bakassians who considered themselves Nigerians and they started to arm themselves on 2 July 2006. Two years later the Nigerian Army fully withdrew from the peninsula and it transitioned to Cameroonian control. More than 50 people were killed between the start of the conflict and the full withdrawal of the Nigerians. The conflict largely ended on 25 September 2009 with an amnesty deal, while some militias continued the fight for a few years. In 2021, the Biafra Nations League launched its own insurgency against Cameroonian authorities in Bakassi.

== Cameroonian-Nigerian border conflict ==
Nigerian-Cameroonian conflict over Bakassi
Date	1981–2005
Location	Bakassi, Gulf of Guinea
Result	Greentree Agreement

Belligerents
Cameroon	Nigeria

Commanders and leaders
Paul Biya; René Claude Meka	Shehu Shagari; Muhammadu Buhari; Ibrahim Babangida; Ernest Shonekan; Abdulsalami Abubakar; Olusegun Obasanjo

Units involved
Cameroon Armed Forces; Rapid Intervention Brigade (BIR)	Nigerian Armed Forces

Casualties and losses
- 70 killed (1995–2005)

=== Early years of disputes (1960s–1981) ===
After the independence of both Nigeria and Cameroon in 1960, the status of British Cameroons was unclear. A United Nations-sponsored and supervised plebiscite took place the following February resulting in the northern part of the territory voting to remain part of Nigeria, while the southern part voted for reunification with Cameroon. The northern part of British Cameroons was transferred to Nigeria the following June, while the southern part joined Cameroon in October. However, the land and maritime boundaries between Nigeria and Cameroon were not clearly demarcated. One of the resultant disputes was in the Bakassi Peninsula, an area with large oil and gas reserves, which had been de facto administered by Nigeria. In the early 1960s, Nigeria recognised that the peninsula was not a historical part of Nigeria. Nigeria claimed that the British had made an agreement with the local chiefs for protection, and that the resultant border of 1884 should be the official border. Cameroon claimed that the British–German border agreements in 1913 should demarcate the border between the two countries. The dispute was not a major issue between the two countries until the Nigerian President, Yakubu Gowon, was overthrown by General Murtala Mohammed in July 1975. Mohammed claimed that Gowon had agreed to transfer Bakassi to Cameroon when he signed the Maroua Declaration in June. Mohammed's government never ratified the agreement, while Cameroon regarded it as being in force.

=== Armed clashes (1981–2005) ===
In the 1980s tensions rose at the border; with the two countries nearly going to war on 16 May 1981, when five Nigerian soldiers were killed during border clashes. Nigeria claimed that Cameroonian soldiers fired first on the Nigerian patrol. Cameroon claimed Nigerian soldiers opened fire against a Cameroonian vessel close to Bakassi and that Nigeria violated international law in Cameroon's territory. The situation almost led to a full-scale war, but President Shehu Shagari's diplomacy played a crucial role in preventing further conflict, even after Nigerian soldiers had been stationed at the Cameroonian border. There were two further armed incidents in February 1987 in the Lake Chad region; three Cameroonians were kidnapped and tortured by the Nigerians. That same year Cameroonian gendarmes attacked 16 villages around Lake Chad and exchanged the Cameroonian flag for the Nigerian flag. Another incident occurred on 13 May 1989 when Nigerian soldiers boarded and inspected a Cameroonian fishing boat close to Lake Chad. In April 1990 Nigerian soldiers kidnapped and tortured two people. A couple of months later Nigeria claimed that Cameroon was annexing nine fishing settlements on the peninsula. Between April 1990 and April 1991 Nigerian soldiers made a number of incursions into the town of Jabane; on one occasion replacing the Cameroonian flag with the Nigerian standard. The following July the Nigerians occupied the town of Kontcha. The Nigerian Army made veiled threats that it would occupy some areas around Lake Chad. A 1992–1993 Cameroonian attack in Lake Chad resulted in the oppression of Nigerians, some of whom were killed and the rest subject to discriminatory taxation. Despite years of negotiations between the two countries, their relations became worse after Nigerian soldiers occupied Jabane and Diamond Island in the Bakassi Peninsula on 17 November 1993.

Soon thereafter Nigeria accused the Cameroonian Army of having launched incursions into Bakassi and in response sent 500–1,000 soldiers to protect its citizens on the peninsula in December. Tensions rose when both Nigeria and Cameroon sent additional forces to Bakassi on 21 December. The following January the Cameroonians killed an unknown number of Nigerian citizens. On 17 February 1994, the Nigeria-occupied territory close to Lake Chad received 3,000 refugees from the village of Karena after they fled from a violent crackdown by the Cameroonians. During the crackdown 55 people were burnt alive; 90 others were wounded and parts of the village were torched as well. Soon after another incident was reported close to the Cameroon–Nigeria frontier; Cameroonian gendarmes attacked the village of Abana in Cross River State over the border, killing 6 people and sinking 14 fishing boats. On 18–19 February, Nigerian forces attacked the Cameroonians and occupied now the full peninsula including the villages of Akwa, Archibong, Atabong, and Kawa Bana. Between 1 and 25 people were killed in the clashes. On 29 March, Cameroon referred the matter to the International Court of Justice (ICJ). In early August 1995 heavy fighting took place, and local sources claim that 30 people were killed; this was never officially confirmed. On 3 February 1996, another clash occurred, resulting in several casualties. After these armed incidents, Nigeria alleged that France had deployed soldiers in the region. France stated that it had stationed two helicopters and fifteen paratroopers in Cameroon, but had not deployed to the peninsula. Between late 1999 and early 2000 French forces established a military base close to the disputed territory. The fighting between 1995 and 2005 is believed to have claimed 70 lives.

== Insurgency in Bakassi ==
=== First insurgency ===
First Bakassi insurgency
- Part of the conflict in the Niger Delta and the piracy in the Gulf of Guinea
Date	2006–2018
Location	Bakassi, Gulf of Guinea
Result	Most militants surrendered in 2009

Belligerents
Cameroon	Democratic Republic of Bakassi Niger Delta militias Pro-Nigerian militias

Commanders and leaders
Paul Biya; René Claude Meka	Tony Ene Asuquo † (BAMOSD) "Commander Ebi Dari" (BFF)

Units involved
Cameroon Armed Forces; Rapid Intervention Brigade (BIR)	Bakassi groups; BAMOSD; BFF; SCAPO; LSCP; BSDF; Niger Delta groups; MEND

==== Prelude (2001–2006) ====
In 2001, the Cameroonian Army suffered two killed and eleven missing in what was described at the time as a pirate attack. On 10 October 2002, the ICJ determined that Cameroon was the rightful owner of the peninsula. In Bakassi, there were at least 300,000 Nigerians, at the time they made up 90 per cent of the population. They had to choose between giving up their Nigerian nationality; keeping it and being treated as foreign nationals; or leaving the peninsula and moving to Nigeria. The United Nations (UN) supported the ICJ verdict, putting pressure on Nigeria to accept it. The Nigerian President, Olusegun Obasanjo, had attracted a lot of criticism from the international community and from within Nigeria. He grudgingly accepted the judgement, although he did not immediately withdraw the Nigerian forces from the peninsula. An agreement was signed to start demarcating the entire Nigerian-Cameroonian border; owing to contradicting reference points from colonial maps, as of February 2021, this process has yet to be completed.

On 12 June 2006, Nigeria and Cameroon signed the Greentree Agreement, allowing Nigeria to keep its civil administration in Bakassi for another two years. The Nigerian Army agreed to withdraw at least 3,000 soldiers within 60 days. It also agreed to give back a part to Cameroon. Following the agreement, a Bakassian delegation threatened to declare independence if the handover was carried out. On 2 July 2006 the Bakassi Movement for Self-Determination (BAMOSD) announced that it would join the Movement for the Emancipation of the Niger Delta (MEND) to secede from Cameroon and on the 9th, they carried out the threat. They and the Southern Cameroons People's Organisation (SCAPO) declared the independence of the "Democratic Republic of Bakassi". The separatists were supported by Biafran separatist rebels. Nigeria's Senate claimed in November 2007 that ceding Bakassi was illegal, but this action by the senate had no effect.

==== Main phase (2006–2013) ====
Flag of the Democratic Republic of Bakassi, as proposed by BAMOSD.

René Claude Meka, the Cameroon Chief of Staff, was tasked with securing the territory by deploying the Rapid Intervention Brigade (BIR). The insurgency was largely sea-based and the mangroves of Bakassi offered the insurgents hiding places. They used pirate tactics in their struggle: attacking ships, kidnapping sailors and carrying out seaborne raids on targets as far away as Limbe and Douala. Nigeria also faced insurgent attacks, as rebels in the southern part of the country were fiercely opposed to the border change. On 17 August 2006 the leader of BAMOSD died in a car accident together with 20 others in Cross River State.

Clashes occurred in the region between suspected Nigerian soldiers and Cameroon soldiers on 13 November 2007, in which 21 Cameroonian soldiers died. Nigeria denied involvement in the clashes and claimed its soldiers were also attacked by an unknown armed group; it also claimed none of its soldiers were killed. The region was beset by both Nigerian criminals and rebels; and a previously unknown rebel group called the Liberators of the Southern Cameroon (LSCP) claimed responsibility for some killings. More Cameroon soldiers were killed in attacks in June and July 2008. On 14 August, Nigeria officially withdrew from Bakassi, with 50 people having been killed in the previous year. In October 2008 a militant group known as the Bakassi Freedom Fighters (BFF) boarded a ship and took its crew hostage, threatening to execute them unless the Cameroon government agreed to negotiate on Bakassian independence. This BFF action failed to impact the policies of Nigeria and Cameroon regarding the peninsula. On 14 August 2009 Cameroon assumed complete control of Bakassi. On 25 September an amnesty offer was made and most Bakassian militias surrendered their weapons and returned to civilian life.

The BFF refused to surrender; joining forces with militants in the Niger Delta, they declared that they would destroy the local economy. In December 2009 a police officer was killed off Bakassi in a motorised canoe and the BFF claimed responsibility. On 6 to 7 February 2011, the rebels launched an attack at Limbe and killed two Cameroonians, wounded one, and eleven were missing. In 2012, the BAMOSD launched a national flag and declared independence on 9 August. On the 16th they captured two Cameroonians. In 2013, Cameroon launched a violent crackdown, causing 1,700 people to flee. This angered many Nigerians and prompted the Nigerian government to threaten military intervention. This intervention never materialised.

==== Sporadic clashes (2013–2018) ====
After the agreement, many residents had problems with establishing the recognition of their nationalities in both countries. A lack of identification documents made some Nigerians at risk of becoming stateless, after the ceding of Bakassi. Since the ceding of Bakassi the Cameroonians have been brutalising and harassing the local Nigerians. According to the academic Agbor Beckly the Cameroonian police want them to leave. Due to the discrimination of the Cameroonians against the locals, most of them were afraid and were in risk to becoming stateless, and many of them decided to not register their children as Cameroonians. On 15 August 2013 the Cameroon government gained full sovereignty over Bakassi and the residents had to pay their first taxes after a 5-year tax-free transition. While militant activity in Bakassi gradually subsided, the cause of the conflict remained unresolved. Between September 2008 and 2019, more than a third of the local Nigerian population has fled to Nigeria. On 13 February 2015, militants killed a policeman and kidnapped another. In 2017 a diplomatic crisis erupted when it was reported that Cameroonian soldiers had killed 97 Nigerian citizens in Bakassi. This report turned out to be false, and Cameroon subsequently dismissed two village chiefs whom it found responsible for spreading the false news.

Most remaining separatists, including the Bakassi Freedom Fighters (BFF) under "Commander Ebi Dari", ultimately joined the Nigerian amnesty program and put down their weapons. A small number of Bakassi militants kept fighting. Dissatisfaction with Cameroonian governance remained high in Bakassi, however, especially among former activists.

=== Pro-Biafra insurgency ===
Pro-Biafran insurgency in Bakassi
- Part of the Anglophone Crisis and the insurgency in Southeastern Nigeria
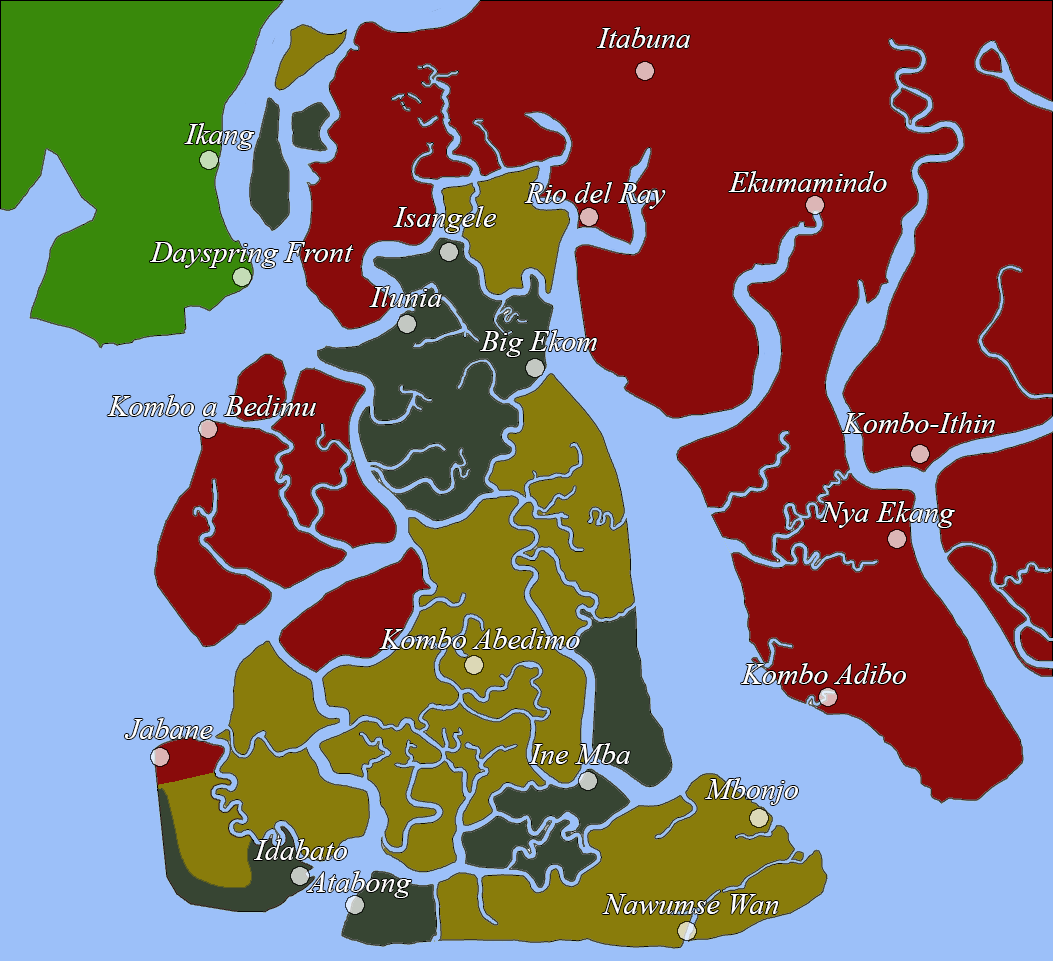
- Approximate map of the Bakassi conflict: Biafra Nations League territory Cameroonian government and BIR presence Nigerian government presence Contested/unclear control
Date	2021–present
Location	Bakassi, Gulf of Guinea
Status	Ongoing

Belligerents
Cameroon; Nigeria	(Republic of Biafra) BNL; Niger Delta militias (from 2025)

Commanders and leaders
(Cameroon) Paul Biya (Cameroon) René Claude Meka (Nigeria) Muhammadu Buhari (Nigeria) Bola Tinubu (Nigeria) E.I. Okoro	Princewill Chimezie Richard; Henry Edet (POW)

Units involved
Cameroon Armed Forces; Rapid Intervention Battalion (BIR); Nigerian Armed Forces; Joint border patrols; 13 Brigade	BNL; Black Marine; Niger Delta militias; Liberation Army of the Niger Delta and Bakassi; MEND

Casualties and losses
Unknown	Unknown

==== Lead-up (2018–2021) ====
By 2018, a major rebellion had broken out in the Cameroon's Anglophone territories which included Bakassi. Some former Bakassi separatists voiced support for this uprising; BFF commander "Ebi Dari" later stated that he had made contact with Ambazonian rebels in hopes of securing Bakassi's freedom within an independent Ambazonia.

In May 2019 it was reported that Cameroon police had destroyed the fishing community of Abana, killing at least 40 people. The authorities denied that police personnel had been involved, and blamed a local militia. According to the state government, Cameroonian soldiers subsequently moved into Abana and arrested 15 people suspected of having participated in the killings.

==== BNL campaign (2021–present) ====
In January 2021, the Biafra Nations League (BNL) complained that some of its members as well as pro-Ambazonian activists had been arrested and tortured by Cameroonian soldiers, both in Bakassi and on Nigerian territory. The group said that they would hoist the Biafran flag in the Bakassi Peninsula, and claimed that the locals identified more as Biafrans than as Cameroonians. The group asked oil companies to quit and threatened to carry arms against Cameroon. A few months later, the group declared that it would not allow Cameroon to keep control of Bakassi, and claimed that several local militias on the peninsula were loyal to the Biafran cause. The BNL leadership argued that the growing insurgency in Southeastern Nigeria would allow Biafran loyalists to capture Bakassi, and threatened to launch pirate raids in the nearby waters. On 8 November 2021, the BNL took control of a border crossing between Akpabuyo and Bakassi, blocking the road leading to the peninsula and raising the Biafran flag. The militants retreated before a Nigerian Armed Forces contingent arrived at the location. In the next weeks, the BNL claimed to have seized territory in Bakassi. On 13 April 2022, a BNL commander was killed by the Cameroonian military in Idabato, Bakassi. On July 23, five Cameroonian soldiers were killed when they invaded a BNL camp in Bakassi; the BNL lost one fighter during the clash.

Cameroonian security forces captured a BNL camp in Bakassi in August 2022. BNL militants killed two Cameroonian soldiers and raised the Biafran flag at Abana on the peninsula in January 2023. Soon after, Cameroon claimed that its Rapid Intervention Brigade had captured BNL commander Henry Edet at Atabong East in Bakassi. Suspected BNL followers also attacked ships around Bakassi in February.

In September 2023, Cameroonian forces carried out an offensive against the BNL in Bakassi. Cameroonian and Nigerian troops jointly repelled an attack on a ship in the Gulf of Guinea. Airstrikes were carried out against a BNL camp in Ine Mba forest. In September 2023, Cameroonian forces ousted the BNL from the town of Abana. Days later, gunmen suspected to be BNL ambushed and killed 7 BIR members. and beheaded 3 BIR members. In response, Black Marine carried out a raid against a joint Nigerian-Cameroonian patrol at the border, using a speedboat to throw explosives at soldiers and killing four. On 12 October, BNL bombed and ambushed a Cameroonian patrol in Abana, killing 5 BIR soldiers. On 15 October, the Nigerian 13 Brigade under Brigadier Gen. E.I. Okoro launched "Operation Still Waters 3" at Ikang in Bakassi, officially to combat the local piracy. On the next day, a battle in Idabato subdivision resulted in two BNL militants and five BIR soldiers being injured. On 31 October BNL repelled the invasion on idabato by BIR forces killing 3 of their troops. On 2 November Cameroon soldiers launched airstrikes in BnL camps however no casualties were reported. On 6 November Cameroon carried an airstrike in a Black Marines camp killing two of their members but failed to destroy the camp due to heavy shootout. On Monday 13 November BNL bombed two military gunboats.

On 18 November 2023 militants suspected to be Black marine bombed a prison allowing 15 to escape while leaving 12 Cameroon gendarme s dead in Idabato Subdivision, however no group claimed responsibility for the attack. On 21 November 2023 the Black marine recaptured the oil firms killing 10 BIR soldiers. On 29 November Cameroon released camera drones on Biafra militants.

On December 5, 2023 Militants managed to intercept a Cameroon Jet after it failed to bomb a hideout. However on 6 December Cameroon forces invaded the BNL camp. 3 Nigerian troops were killed while trying to invade a militant hideout. and 9 of them with Cameroon forces were killed later on by militants.

In January 2024, due to increased attacks on Bakassi by Biafran militants there was a protest in Douala and Yaounde and BnL started taking down foreign flags despite the efforts by Cameroon and Nigerian forces. On February 5, the Black Marines attacked a joint Cameroonian-Nigerian border patrol, reportedly killing at least 17 soldiers. Then on February 27 militants suspected to be Black marines invaded Cameroon's Kombo Abedimo Capital in Bakassi and intercepted Cameroon forces killing 5 while one separatist was killed.

On 1 October 2024, gunmen abducted 2 people in the sub-prefect of Idabato and took off towards Nigerian territory, reportedly on flying boats. Later that month, Bernard Okalia Bilai, governor of Cameroon's Southwest Region, ordered a temporary trade ban due to the abduction of local officials. This caused severe economic interruptions in the area. In March 2025 one of the abducted, Idabato's Divisional Officer, was released.

In March 2025, Biafra Militants killed 5 Cameroonian Soldiers around 6:00 am on Thursday, the group launched explosives, hitting their targets and neutralizing two warships.

In May 2025, the little-known "Liberation Army of the Niger Delta and Bakassi" (L.A.N.D. & B) cooperated with MEND during repeated attacks on the main oil supply line in Nigeria's Bayelsa State. Furthermore in November 26 suspected Black Marine forces attacked Cameroonian Headquarters in Abana, killing 11 Cameroonian forces however no group has claimed responsibility for the attack.

== Bibliography ==
- Akanle, Olayinka; Adésìnà, Jìmí Olálékan (2017). The Development of Africa: Issues, Diagnoses and Prognoses. Cham, Switzerland: Springer. ISBN 978-3319-662-42-8.
- Akinyemi, Omolara (2014). "Borders in Nigeria's Relations with Cameroon". Journal of Arts and Humanities. 3 (9). Cornell University Ithaca. ISSN 2167-9053.
- Amoah, M. (2011). Nationalism, Globalization, and Africa. Berlin: Springer. ISBN 978-1137-002-16-7.
- Beckly, Agbor Tabetah (2013). The Perceptions/Views of Cameroon–Nigerian Bakassi Border Conflict by the Bakassi People (PDF) (Thesis). Historiska institutionen Uppsala universitet. pp. 67–68, 93.
- Egede, Edwin E.; Igiehon, Mark Osa (2017). The Bakassi Dispute and the International Court of Justice: Continuing Challenges. New York: Routledge. ISBN 978-1317-040-74-3.
- Gibler, Douglas M. (2018). International Conflicts, 1816–2010: Militarized Interstate Dispute Narratives. Lanham, Maryland: Rowman & Littlefield. ISBN 978-1442-275-59-1.
- Institute on Statelessness and Inclusion (2018). Submission to the Human Rights Council at the 30th Session of the Universal Periodic Review: (Third Cycle, May 2018) (PDF) (Report). Institute on Statelessness and Inclusion.
- Lukong, Hilary V. (2011). The Cameroon–Nigeria Border Dispute. Management and Resolution, 1981–2011. Mankon, Bamenda: African Books Collective. pp. 2, 47–48, 50–52. ISBN 978-9956-717-59-0.
- Ngalim, Aloysius Nyuymengka (2016). "African Boundary Conflicts and International Mediation: The Absence of Inclusivity in Mediating the Bakassi Peninsula Conflict" (PDF). Social Science Research Council. 9: 1–2.
- Ngwa, Canute Ambe; Funteh, Mark Bolak (2019). Crossing the Line in Africa: Reconsidering and Unlimiting the Limits of Borders within a Contemporary Value. Bermandan, Cameroon: Langaa RPCIG. ISBN 978-9956-550-89-0.
- Ngwane, George (2015). "Preventing Renewed Violence Through Peace Building in the Bakassi Peninsula (Cameroon)" (PDF). Jimbi Central.
- Udeoji, Angela Ebele (2013). "The Bakassi Peninsula Zone of Nigeria and Cameroon: The Politics of History in Contemporary African Border Disputes". International Journal of Social Sciences and Humanities Reviews. 4 (2). National Open University of Nigeria: 92–93. ISSN 2276-8645. S2CID 151691502.
