= Cameroonian Civil War =

Cameroonian Civil War may refer to any of these internal conflicts in Cameroon:

- Cameroon War
- Bakassi conflict
- Boko Haram insurgency
- Anglophone Crisis
