= Nguetchewe attack =

2020 Boko Haram attack in Cameroon

- Part of the Boko Haram insurgency
- Location: IDP camp in Guirbala neighborhood, Nguetchewe, Far North Region, Cameroon
- Date: August 1-2, 2020; 5:30am
- Target: Vigilante outpost (first attack); IDP camp (second attack)
- Deaths: 19 killed: 17 civilians killed; 2 suicide bombers killed
- Injuries: 16
- Victim: 1,500 refugees as a result of the attack
- Perpetrator: Boko Haram

Between August 1 and 2, 2020, militants from Boko Haram attacked an IDP camp in the Guirbala neighborhood of Nguetchewe, Far North Region, Cameroon. Seventeen civilians were killed in the attack, and two child suicide bombers from Boko Haram helped conduct the attack.

== Background ==
The IDP camp in Nguetchewe, Cameroon, houses 1,500 internally displaced refugees from the Boko Haram insurgency in Cameroon and Nigeria. In early 2020, Boko Haram attacks in Cameroon's Far North Region increased, with twenty-two attacks by Boko Haram in the Mozogo district of Cameroon in January alone. Nguetchewe has been attacked several times during the jihadist insurgency; an attack in January 2016 killed five people, and an attack one month later killed six others.

Between sixteen to twenty gendarmes of the Polyvalent Intervention Group of the National Gendarme (GNGIP) were present in Nguetchewe at the time of the attack, although none were present in the Guirbala IDP camp where the attack occurred. Residents who offered to defend themselves from Boko Haram attacks did not have the equipment or training to do so. Prior to the attack, there were only ten volunteer vigilante fighters as security; no gendarmes or Cameroonian forces were present.

== Attack ==
The first attack occurred on August 1 at a vigilante outpost in the Gokoro neighborhood of Nguetchewe. The vigilantes posted at the checkpoint ran away as Boko Haram had surprised and overpowered them, but the fleeing vigilantes "sounded the alarm" on the Boko Haram threat and called gendarmes to the area. One vigilante was killed in the attack on the outpost.

The next attack began on August 2 at around 5:30am, with Boko Haram fighters yelling "Allahu Akbar!' and firing on fleeing residents of the IDP camp. As residents fled from the attackers, an explosion caused by a suicide bomber rang out. A survivor stated that the first explosion killed eight people immediately, and the second suicide bombing that occurred shortly afterward killed four more. In the aftermath of the attack, residents identified the headless bodies of a boy and a teenage girl as the likely suicide bombers.

Boko Haram fighters also looted houses and livestock of civilians in the IDP camp. Gendarmes confronted the attackers, but were ineffective against them.

== Aftermath ==
Both residents of Nguetchewe stated that the attackers were easily identifiable as Boko Haram as soon as the attack began. This was confirmed later by the mayor of Nguetchewe. By the end of August 2, the death toll stood at sixteen civilians killed and a large number injured. 1,500 people had fled the area since the attack on Nguetchewe, citing insecurity and fears of a second attack by Boko Haram. Nineteen people were killed in the attack, including the two suicide bombers, and sixteen others were injured.

Survivors of the attack stated that the 42nd Motorized Infantry Battalion arrived in Nguetchewe after the attack, and Rapid Intervention Brigade fighters arrived from a nearby Cameroonian base in the morning of August 2. Far North Governor Midjiyiwa Bakary stated that Cameroonian forces increased the number of gendarmes and armed forces in Nguetchewe following the attack.
