= Military ranks of Cameroon =

The Military ranks of Cameroon are the military insignia used by the Cameroon Armed Forces. Being a former colony of France, Cameroon shares a rank structure similar to that of France.

== Commissioned officer ranks ==
The rank insignia of commissioned officers.

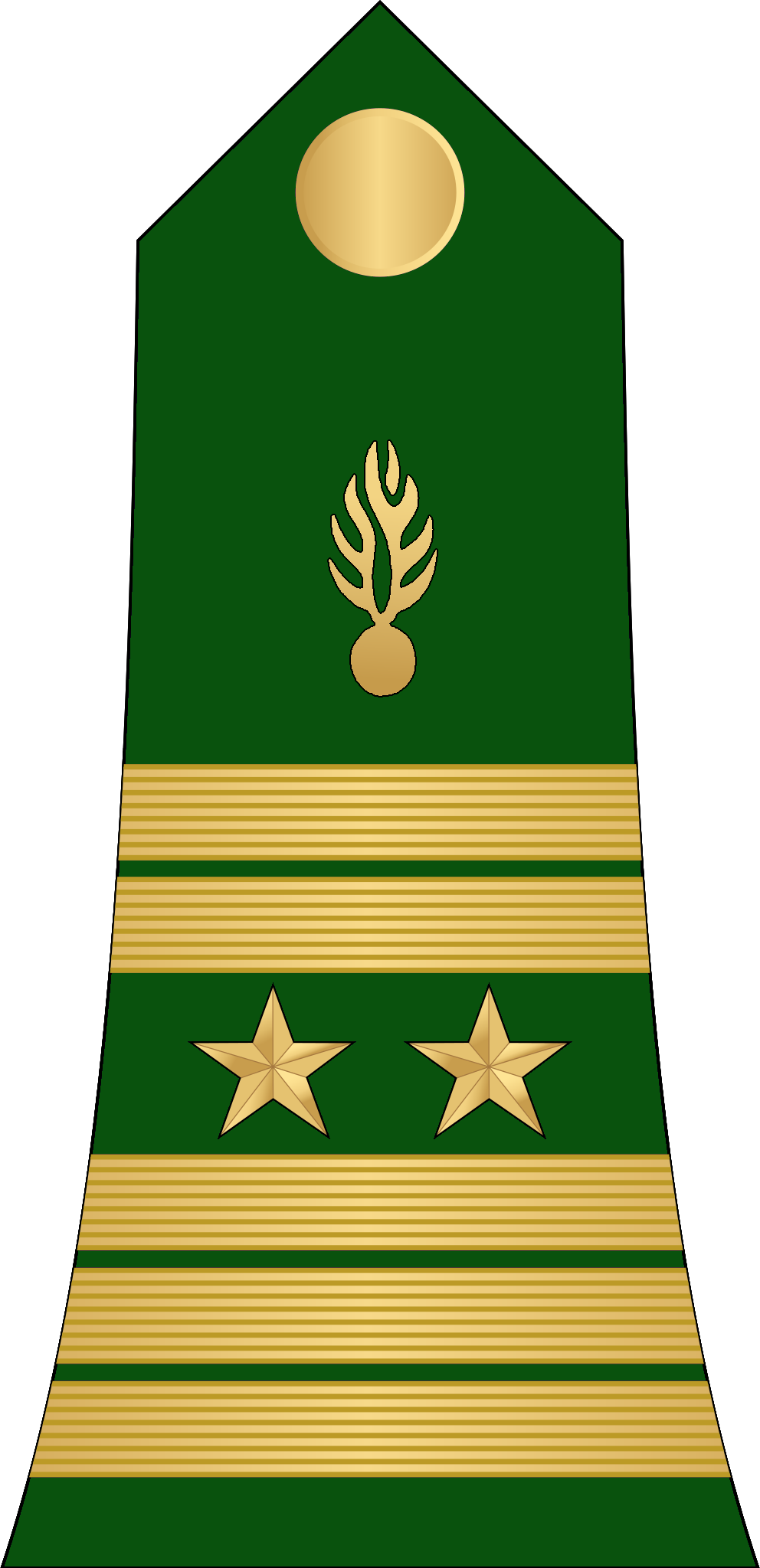
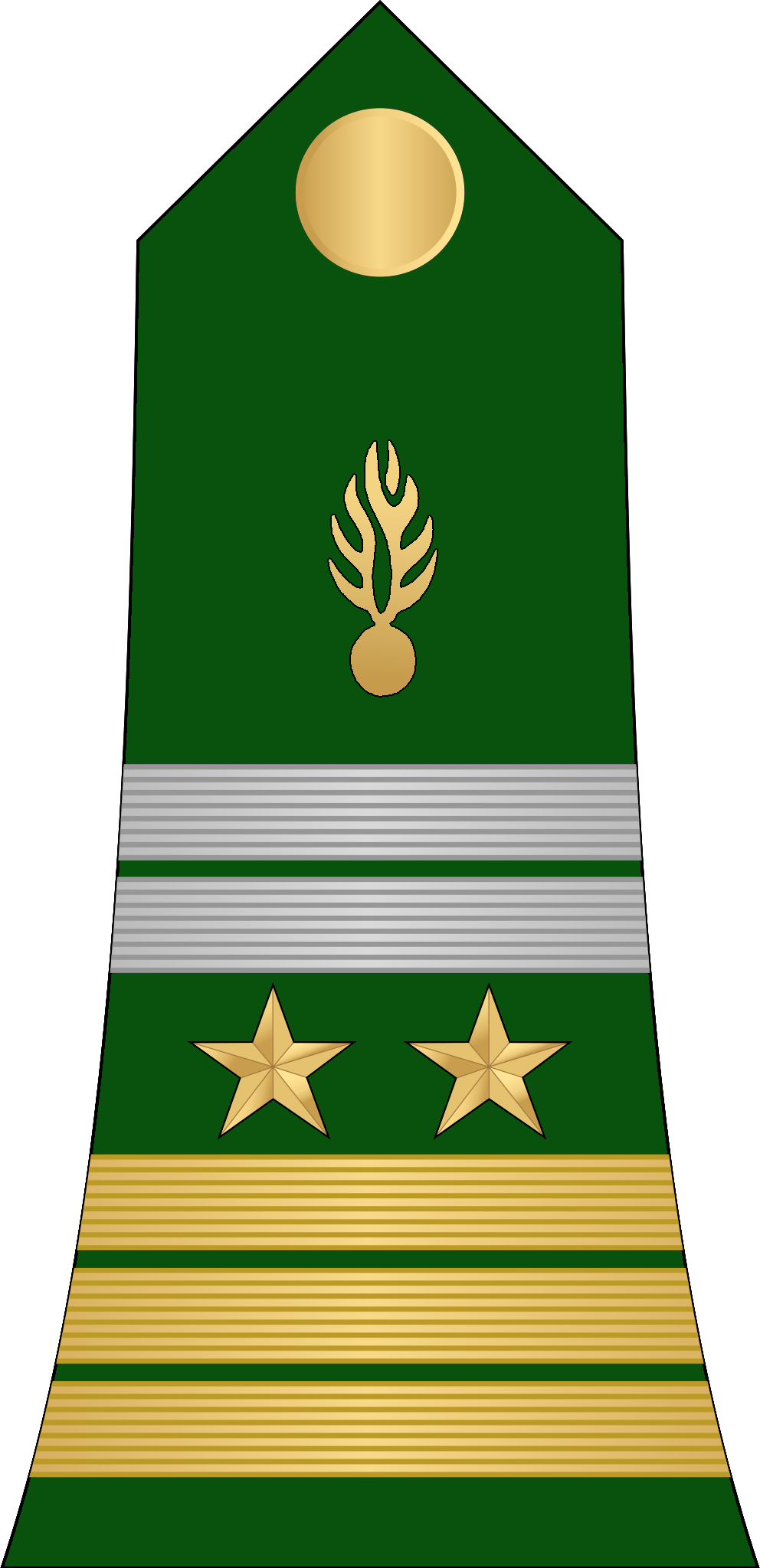
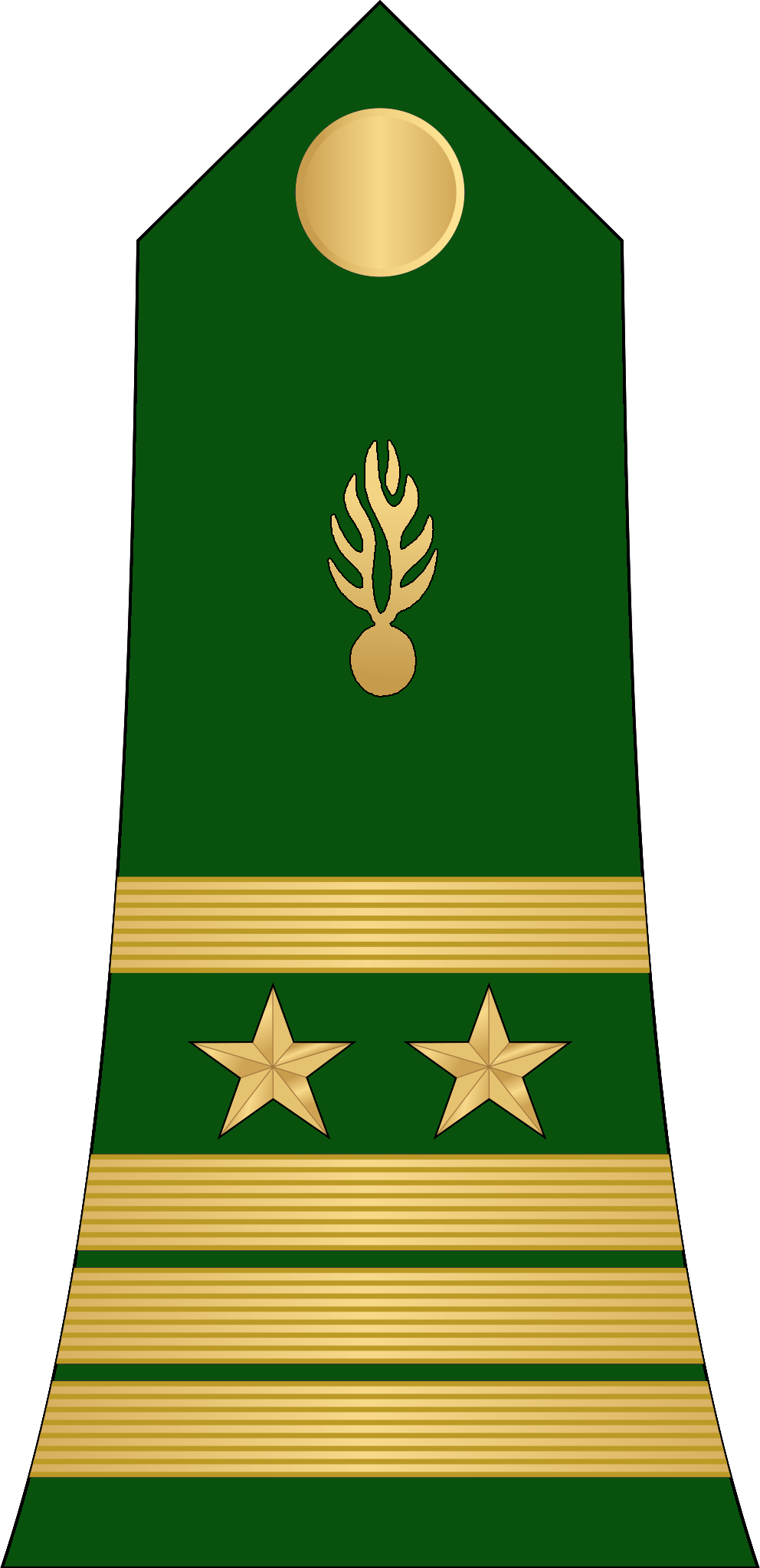
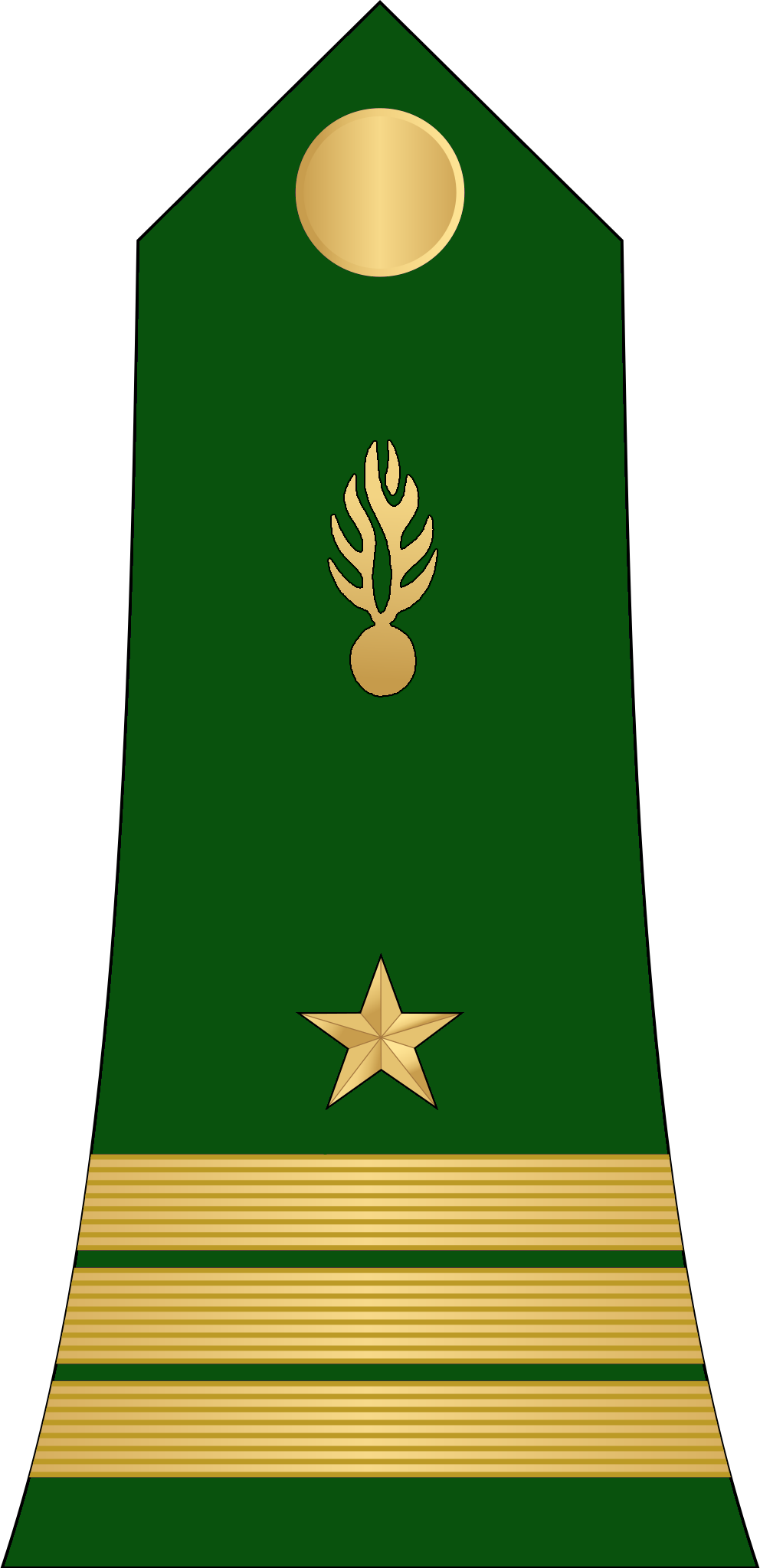
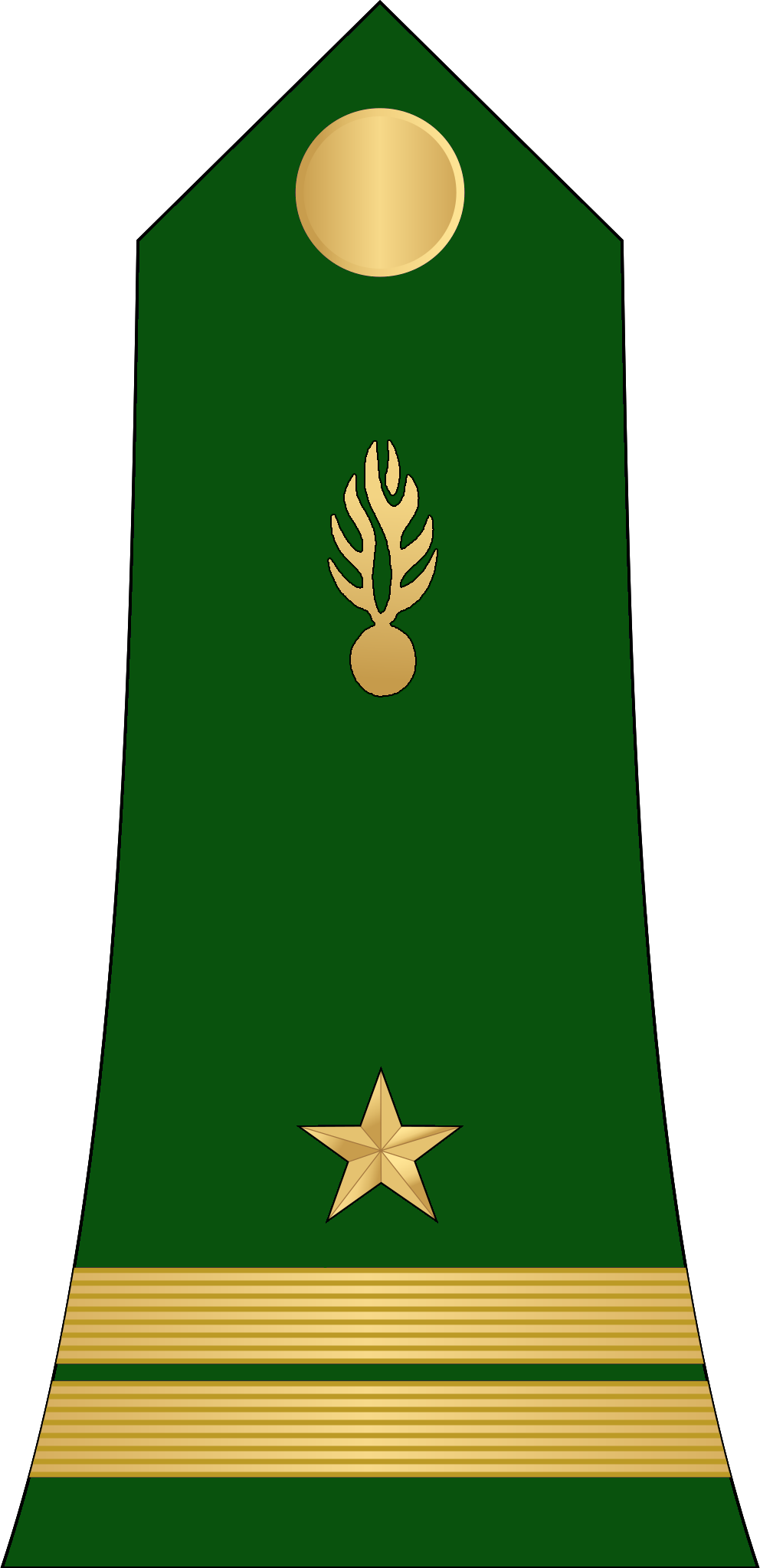
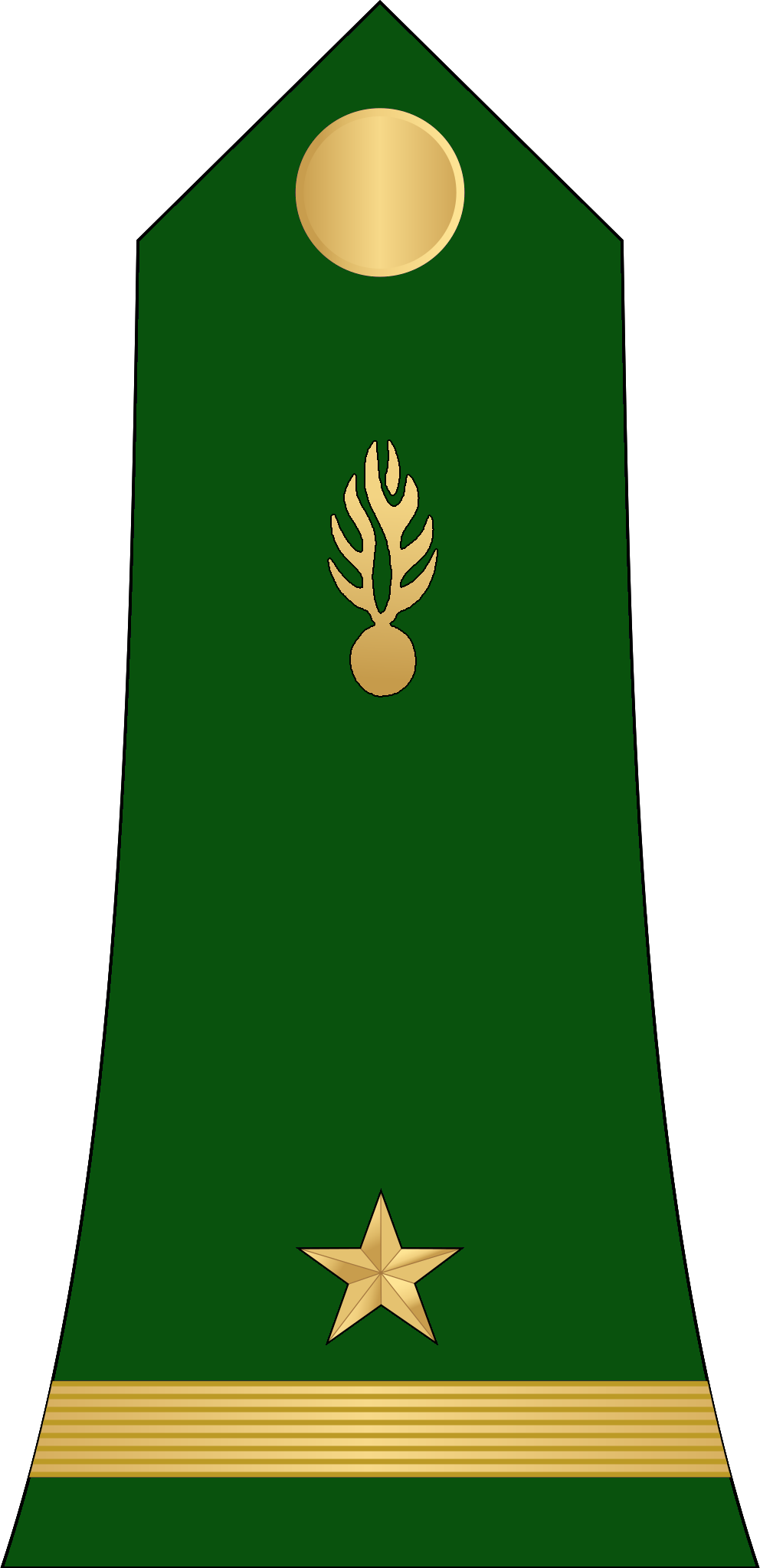
Rank group	General / flag officers				Senior officers			Junior officers
Cameroon Ground Forces
Cameroon Ground Forces	Général d'armée	Général de corps	Général de division	Général de brigade	Colonel	Lieutenant-colonel	Commandant	Capitaine	Lieutenant	Sous-lieutenant
Cameroon Navy
Cameroon Navy	Amiral d'escadre	Vice-amiral d'escadre	Vice-amiral	Contre-amiral	Capitaine de vaisseau	Capitaine de frégate	Capitaine de corvette	Lieutenant de vaisseau	Enseigne de vaisseau de 1^{re} classe	Enseigne de vaisseau de 2^{e} classe
Cameroon Air Force
Cameroon Air Force	Général d'armée aérienne	Général de corps aérien	Général de division aérienne	Général de brigade aérienne	Colonel	Lieutenant-Colonel	Commandant	Capitaine	Lieutenant	Sous-Lieutenant
(Cameroon) Cameroonian National Gendarmerie
(Cameroon) Cameroonian National Gendarmerie	Général d'armée	Général de corps d'armée	Général de division	Général de brigade	Colonel	Lieutenant-Colonel	Chef d'Escadron	Capitaine	Lieutenant	Sous-Lieutenant
Rank group	General / flag officers				Senior officers			Junior officers

=== Student officer ranks ===
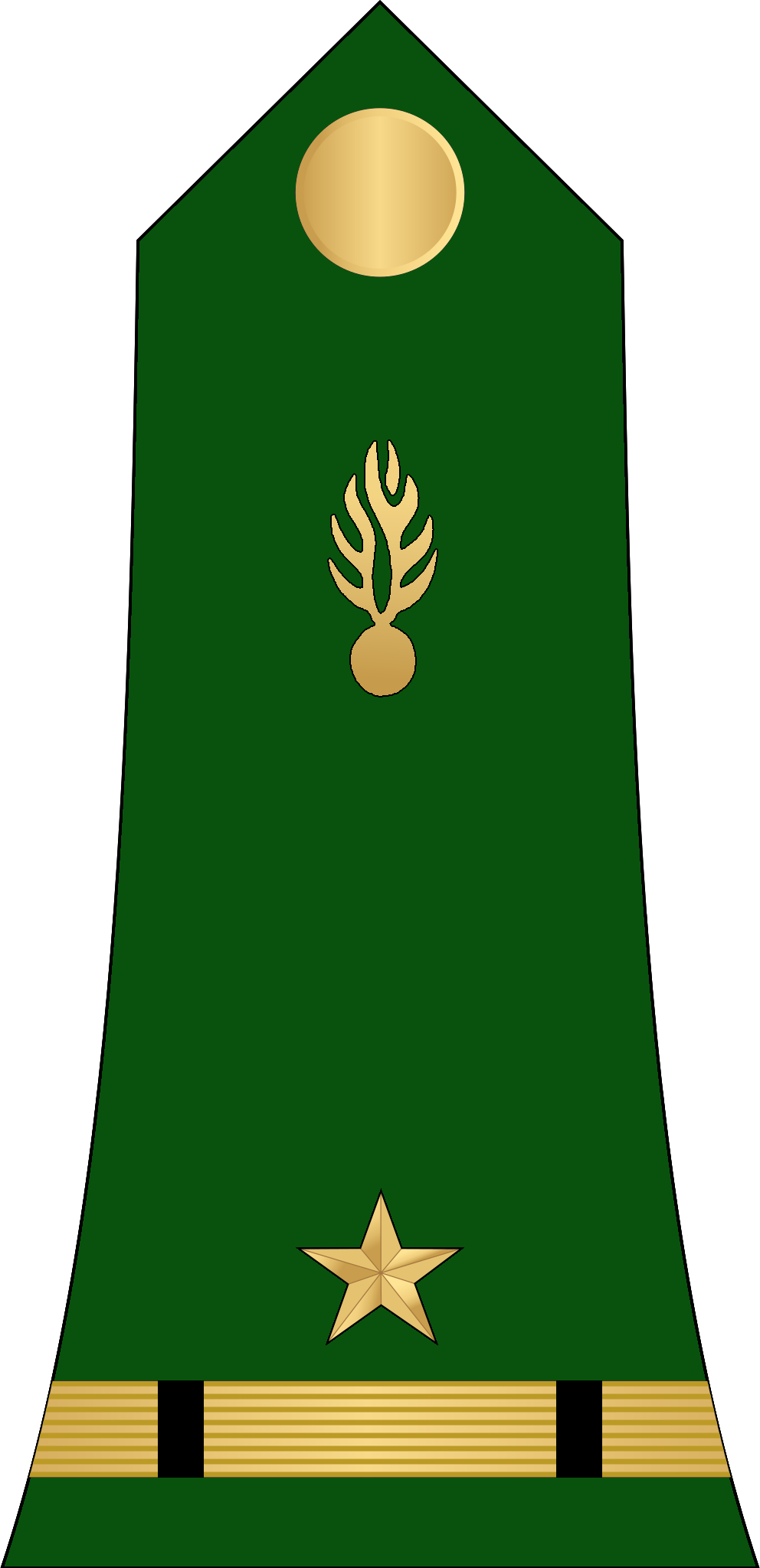
Rank group	Student officers
Cameroon Army
Cameroon Army	Aspirant	Elève officer 2^{è} année	Elève officer 1^{ère} année
Cameroon Navy
Cameroon Navy	Aspirant
Cameroon Air Force
Cameroon Air Force	Aspirant
(Cameroon) Cameroonian National Gendarmerie
(Cameroon) Cameroonian National Gendarmerie	Aspirant	Elève officer 2^{è} année	Elève officer 1^{ère} année

== Other ranks ==
The rank insignia of non-commissioned officers and enlisted personnel.

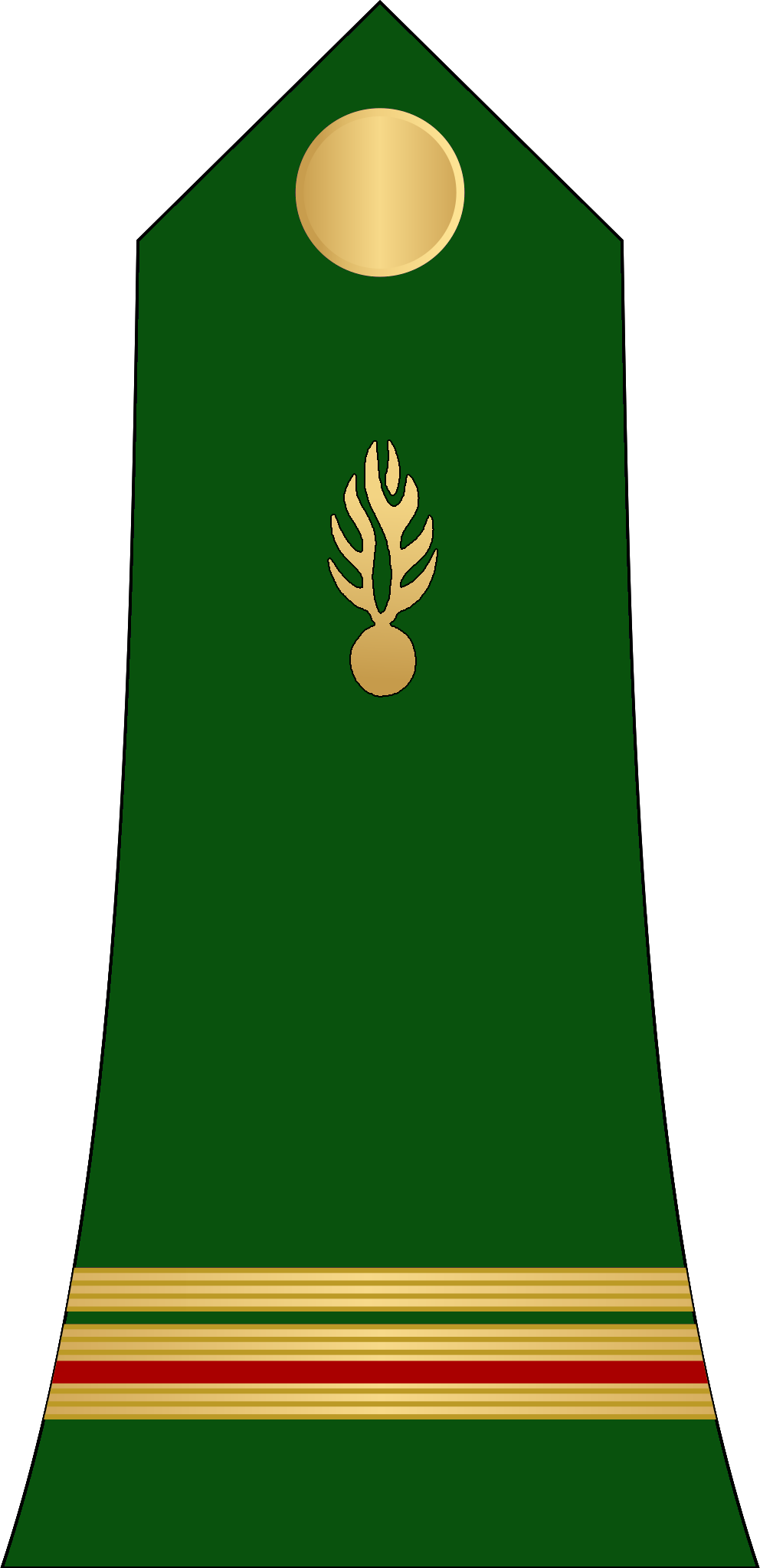
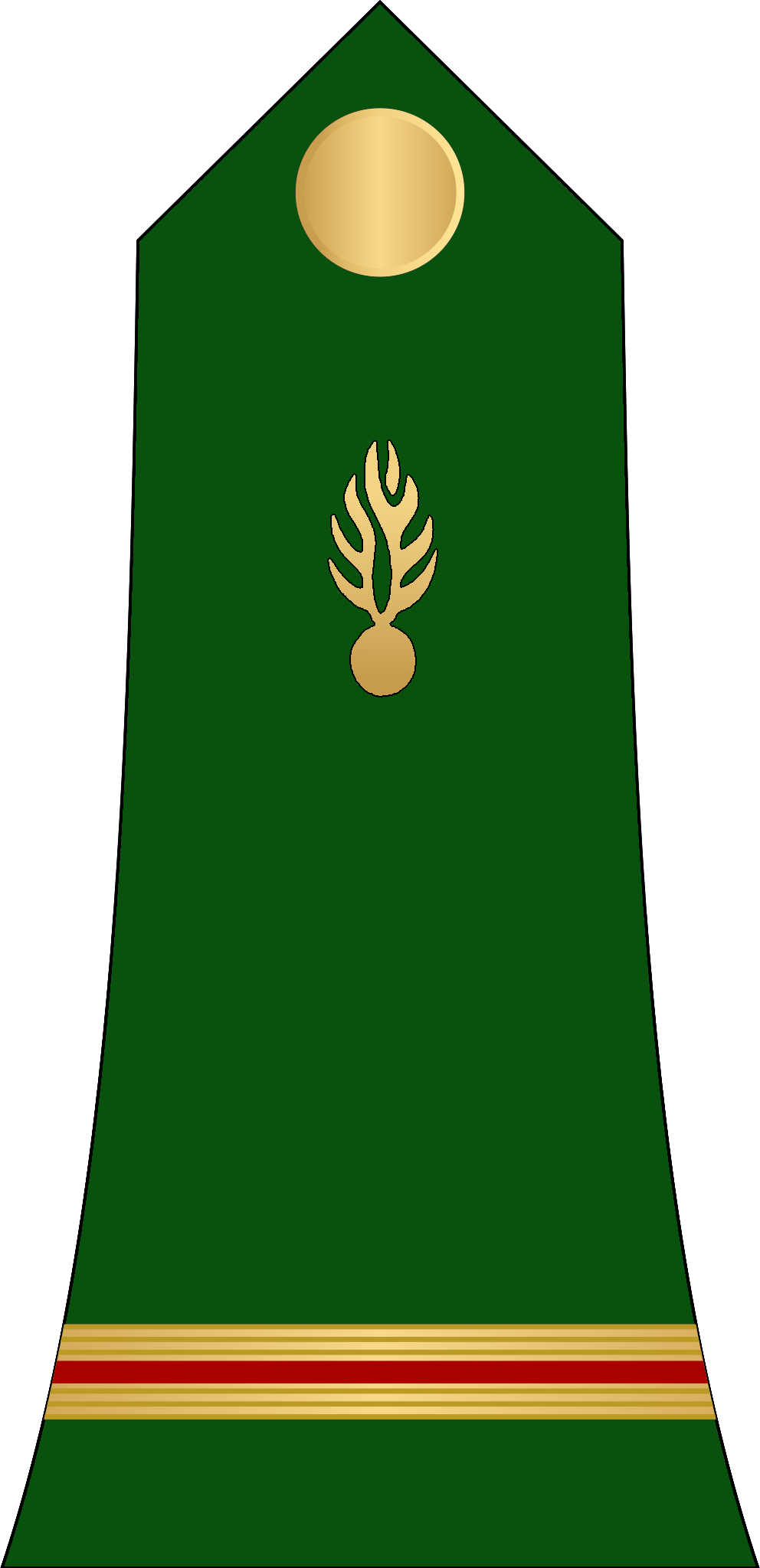
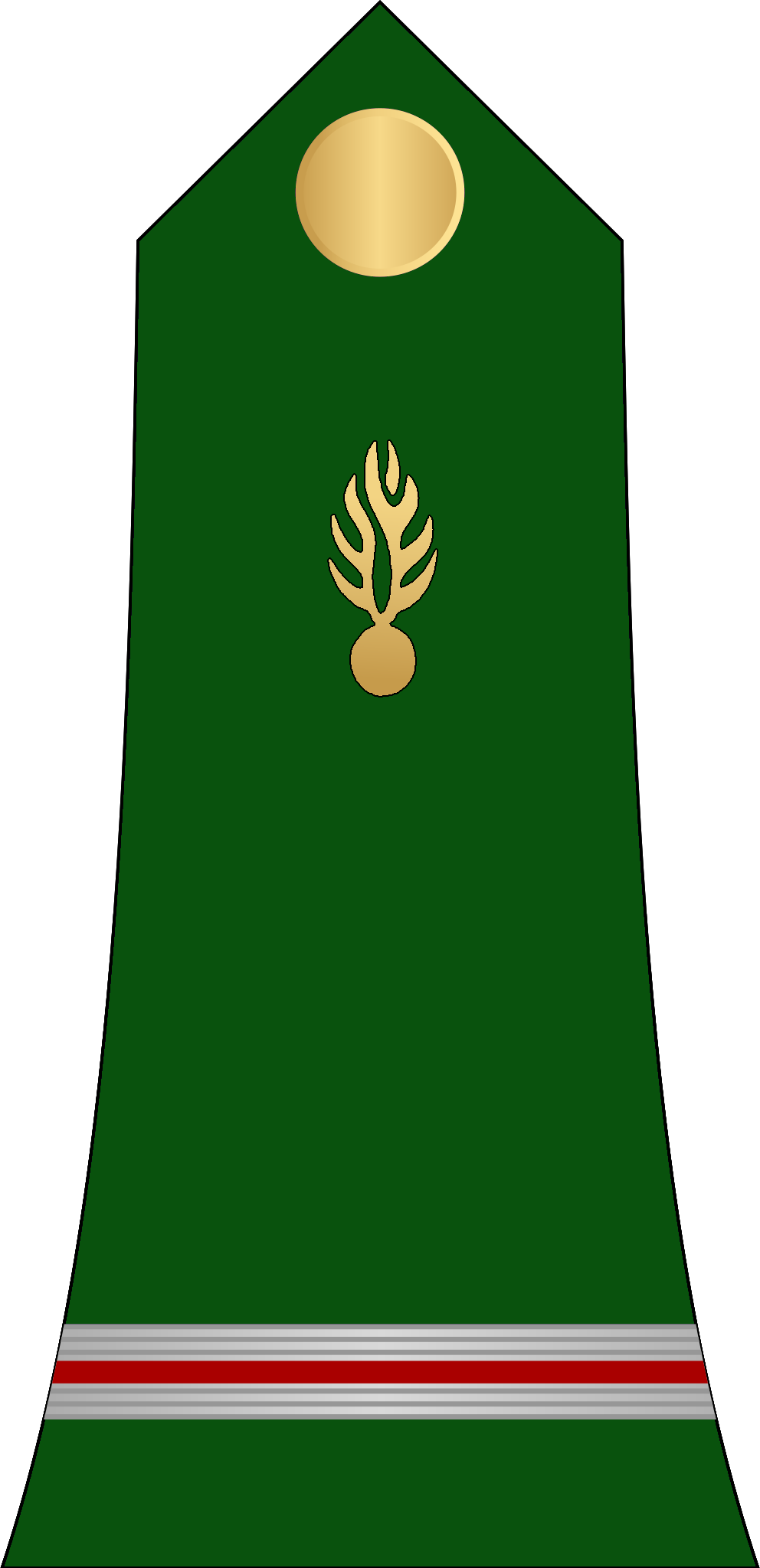
Rank group	Senior NCOs					Junior NCOs		Enlisted
Cameroon Ground Forces
Cameroon Ground Forces	Adjudant-chef		Adjudant	Sergent-chef	Sergent	Caporal-chef	Caporal	Soldat première	Soldat
Cameroon Navy
Cameroon Navy	Maître principal		Premier maître	Maître	Second-maître	Quartier-maître de 1^{ère} classe	Quartier-maître de 2^{ème} classe	Matelot de 1^{re} classe	Matelot
Cameroon Air Force									No insignia
Cameroon Air Force	Adjudant-chef		Adjudant	Sergent-chef	Sergent	Caporal-chef	Caporal	Soldat première	Soldat
(Cameroon) Cameroonian National Gendarmerie
(Cameroon) Cameroonian National Gendarmerie	Adjudant-chef major	Adjudant-chef	Adjudant	Maréchal-des-logis-chef	Maréchal-des-logis	Gendarme major		Gendarme	Elève Gendarme
Rank group	Senior NCOs					Junior NCOs		Enlisted
