= Kouyape attack =

2020 attack on IDP camp in Cameroon

- Part of the Boko Haram insurgency
- Location: Kouyape, Far North Region, Cameroon
- Date: September 1, 2020; 1:00 AM (West Africa Time, UTC+01:00)
- Deaths: 7 (including two Boko Haram fighters)
- Injuries: 14
- Perpetrator: Boko Haram

On September 1, 2020, Boko Haram attacked an IDP camp in Kouyape, Far North Region, Cameroon, killing seven people and injuring fourteen others.

== Background ==
On August 1, 2020, Boko Haram militants attacked an IDP camp in Nguetchewe, also in Cameroon's Far North Region. The attack killed 19 people, mostly refugees, and many residents of the camp subsequently fled Nguetchewe due to fears about their safety. Some of the refugees made their way to the refugee camps in Kouyape, near the town of Goldavi in Far North.

== Attack ==
Around 1,200 people were present in the village of Kouyape and the surrounding camps at the time of the attack. At 1:00 AM on September 1, around 100 Boko Haram fighters launched an incursion into the village. A vigilante present in Kouyape alerted the Cameroonian Rapid Intervention Brigade (BIR) of the attack, and BIR soldiers counter-attacked quickly. As Boko Haram withdrew from the village, a suicide bomber detonated his explosives, killing himself and four other people. Seven people were also injured in the attack.

Two Boko Haram fighters were killed during the attack, including the suicide bomber and a fighter killed by BIR. The death toll later rose to seven killed, in addition to the 14 people injured.
