= Vehicle registration plates of Cameroon =

Republic of Cameroon
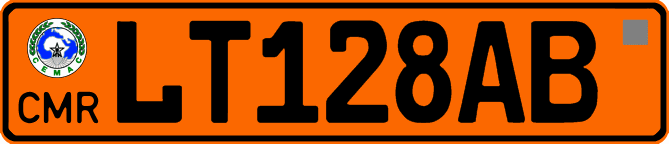
- Regular legal standard number plat from Cameroon.
- Country: Cameroon
- Country code: CAM (unofficially using CMR)

Current series
- Size: 520 mm × 110 mm 20.5 in × 4.3 in
- Serial format: AB 123 CD (AB being the regional code)
- Colour (front): Black on orange
- Colour (rear): Black on orange

The vehicle registration plates of Cameroon is a legal form requiring the citizens of Cameroon to have their cars registered.

== Regular license plates ==
The current scheme of regular license plates was introduced in 1985. It has AB1234V formats or AB123VH where AB is the code region, 1234 is the number, and SH is the series. The regular plate has an orange background with black marks. Since 2005, to reflect the German FE font used, on the left side of the plate are the emblems of the Economic Community of Central African States code and the CMR emblem.

=== Regional coding ===
The current allocation combinations for regional coding was introduced in 1985. Cameroon has 10 regions.

- AD — Adamawa
- CE — Center
- EN — Far North
- ES — East
- LT — Littoral
- NO — North
- NW — Northwest
- OU — West
- SU — South
- SW — Southwest
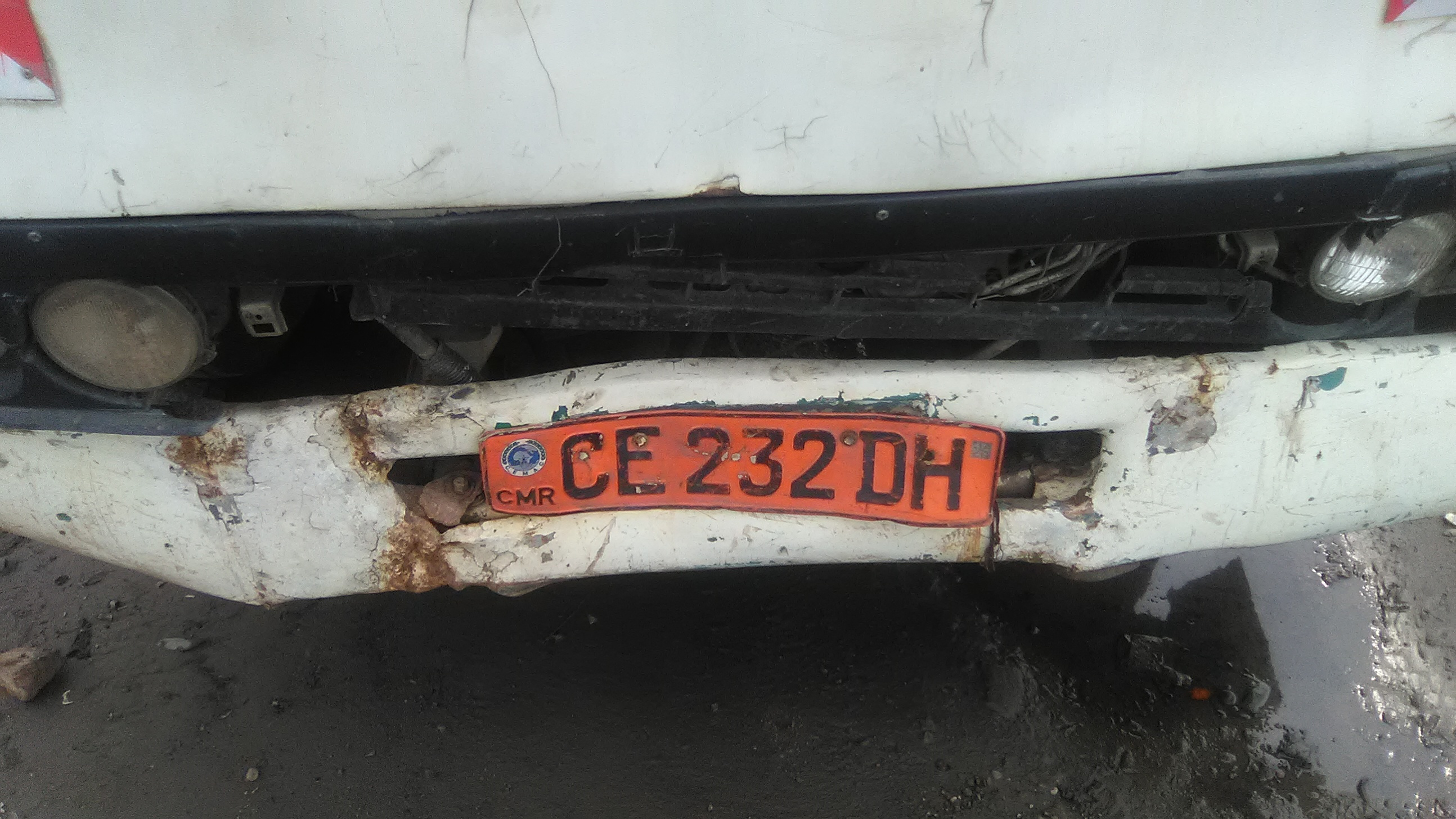
CE : Center

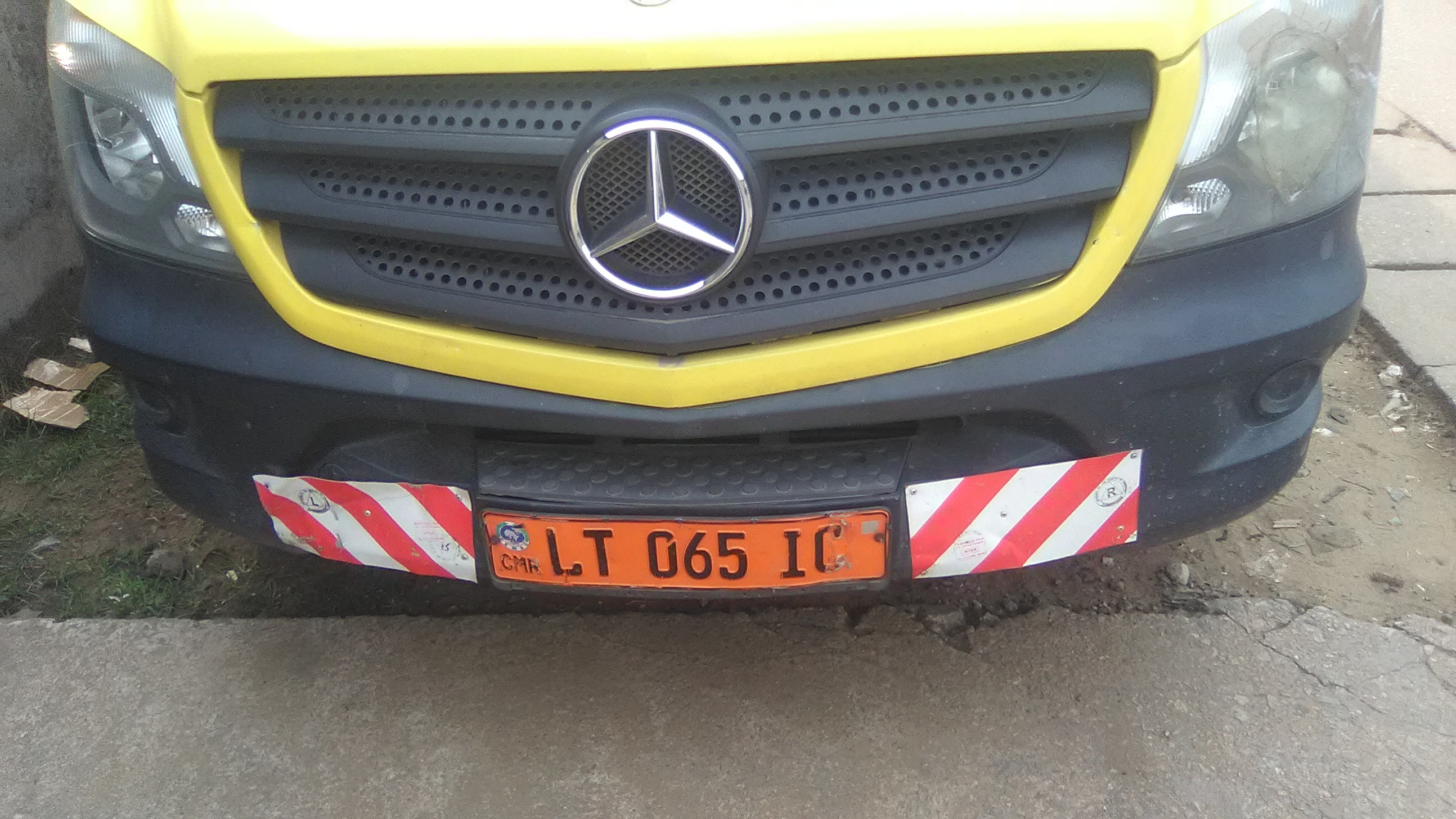
LT : Litoral

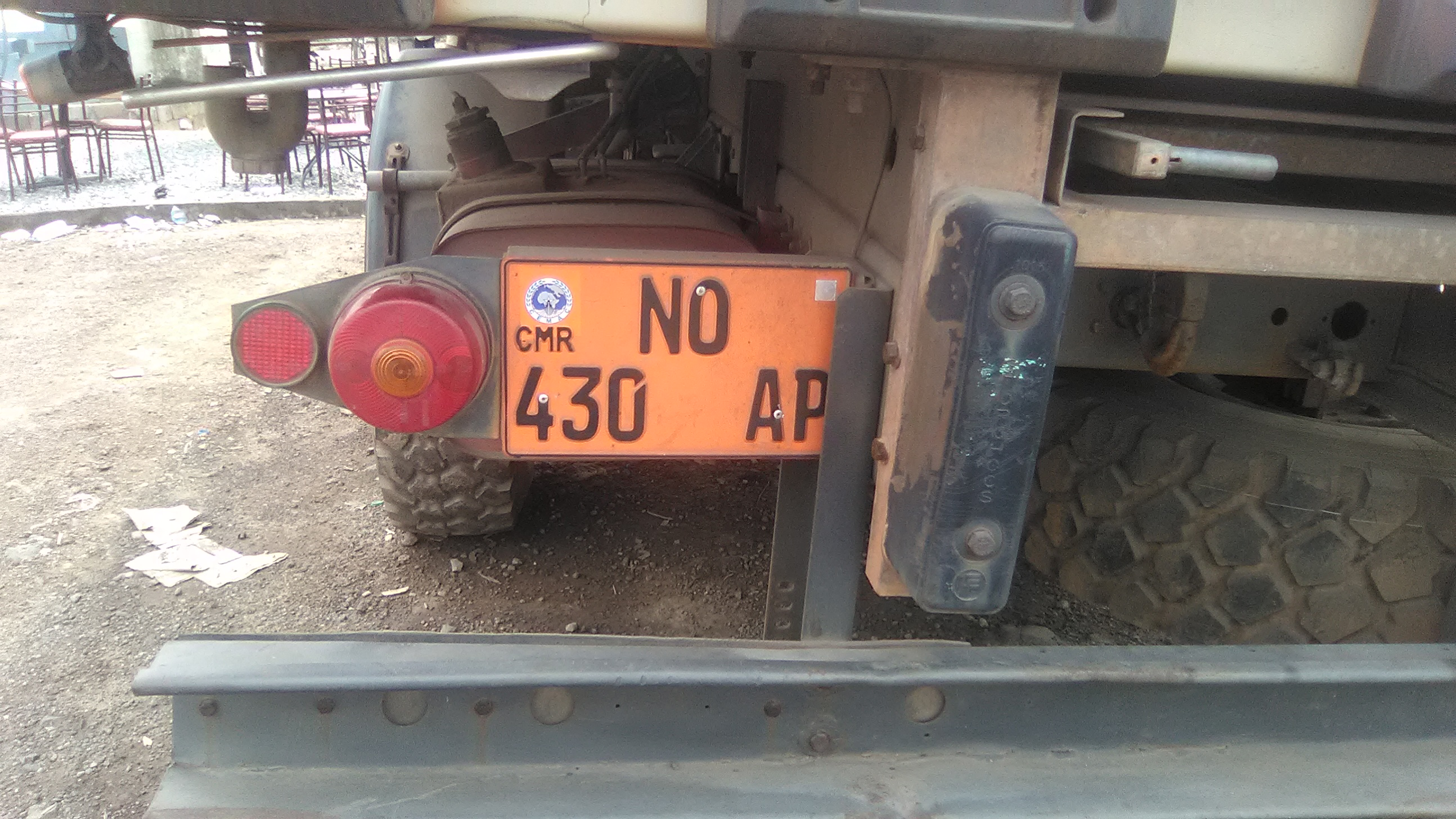
NO : North

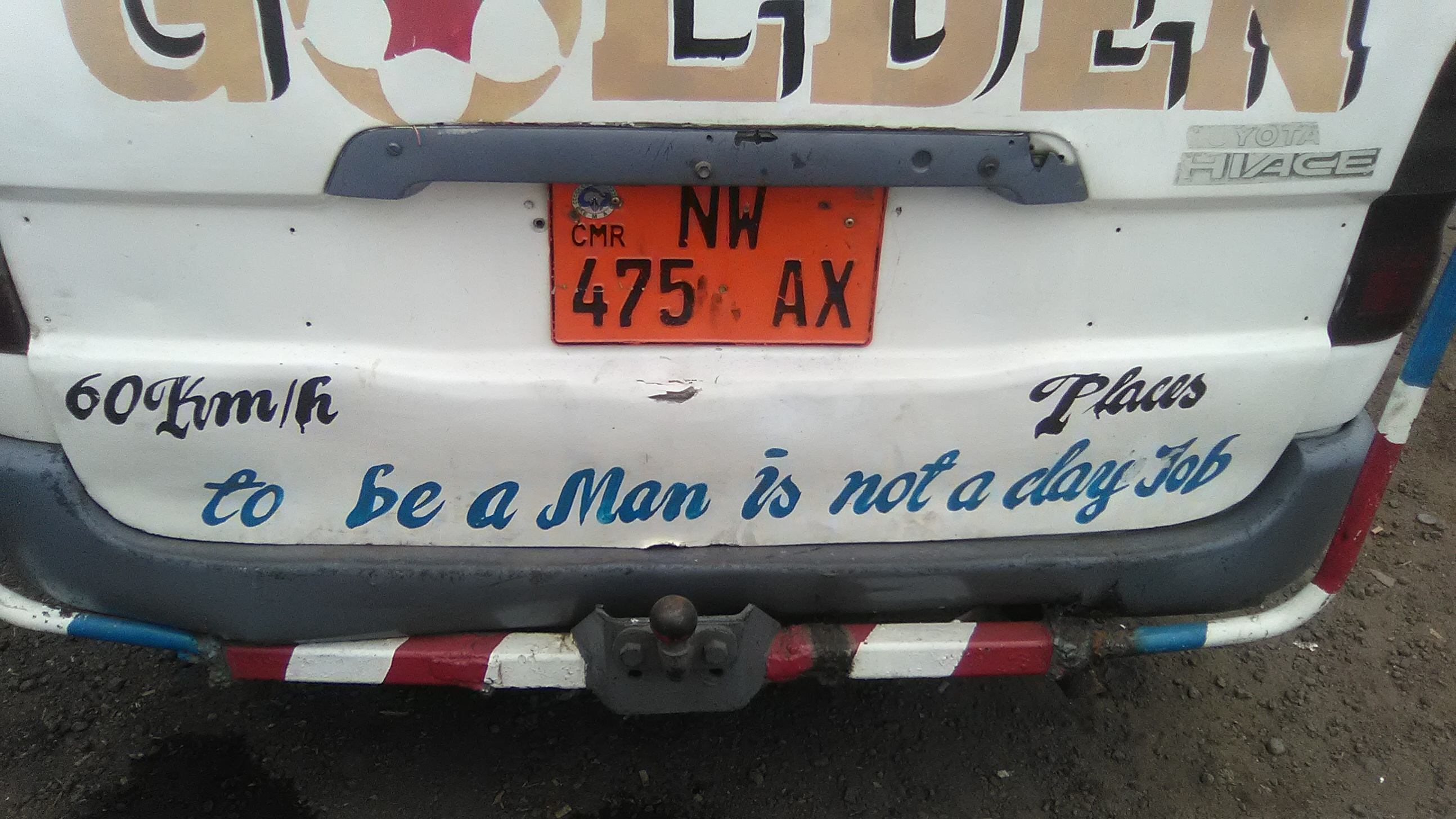
NW : North West

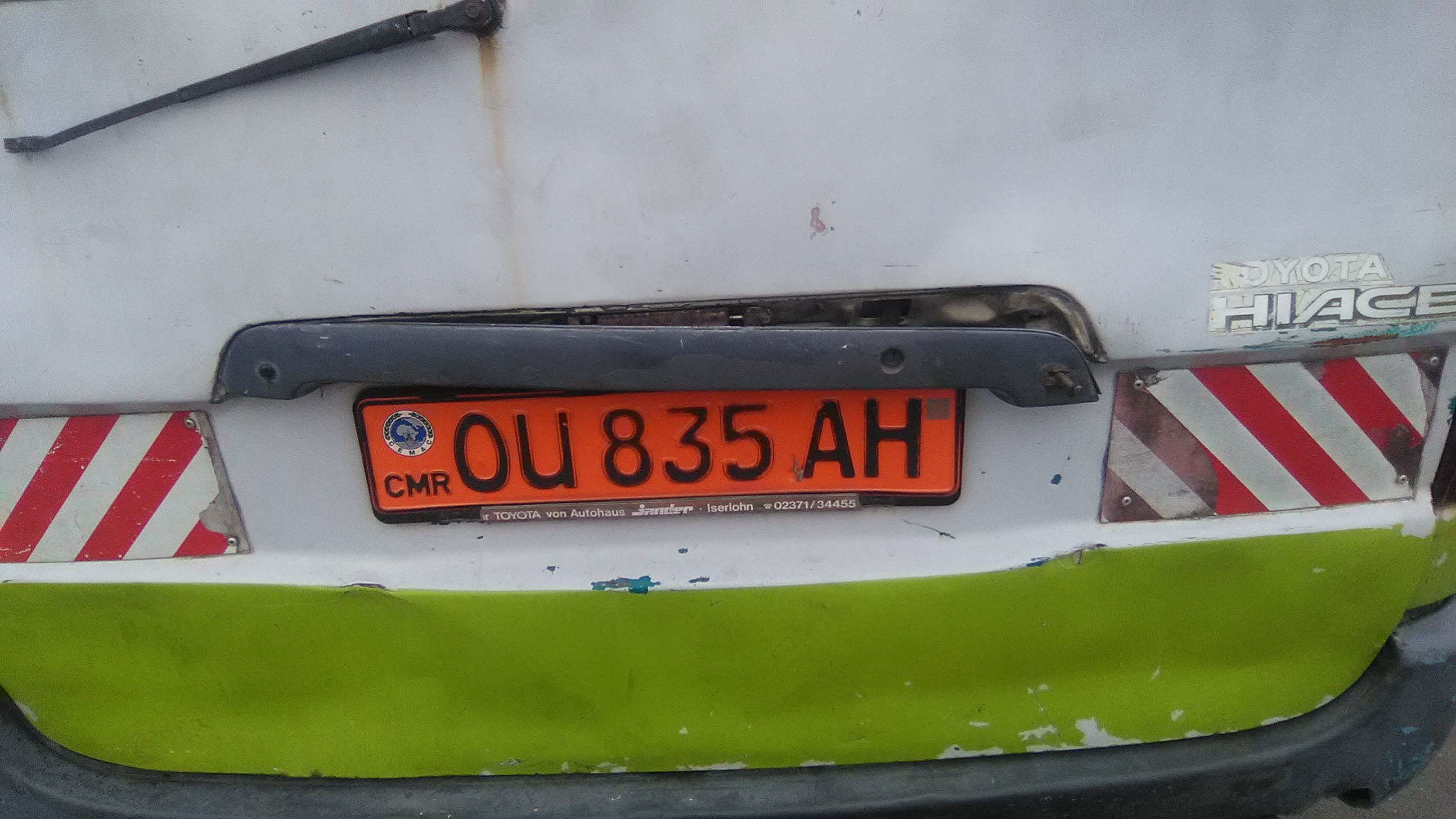
OU : West

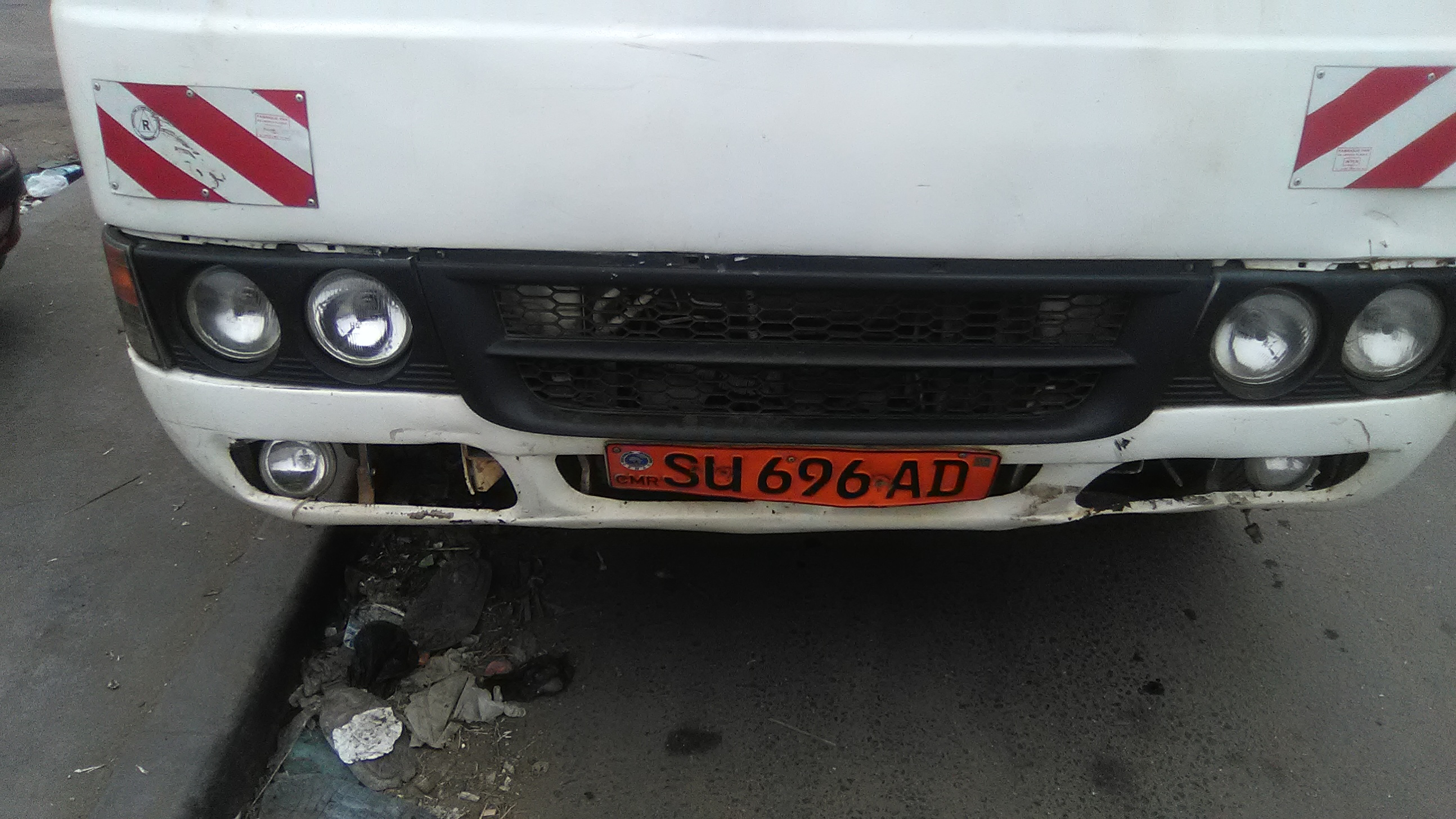
SU : South

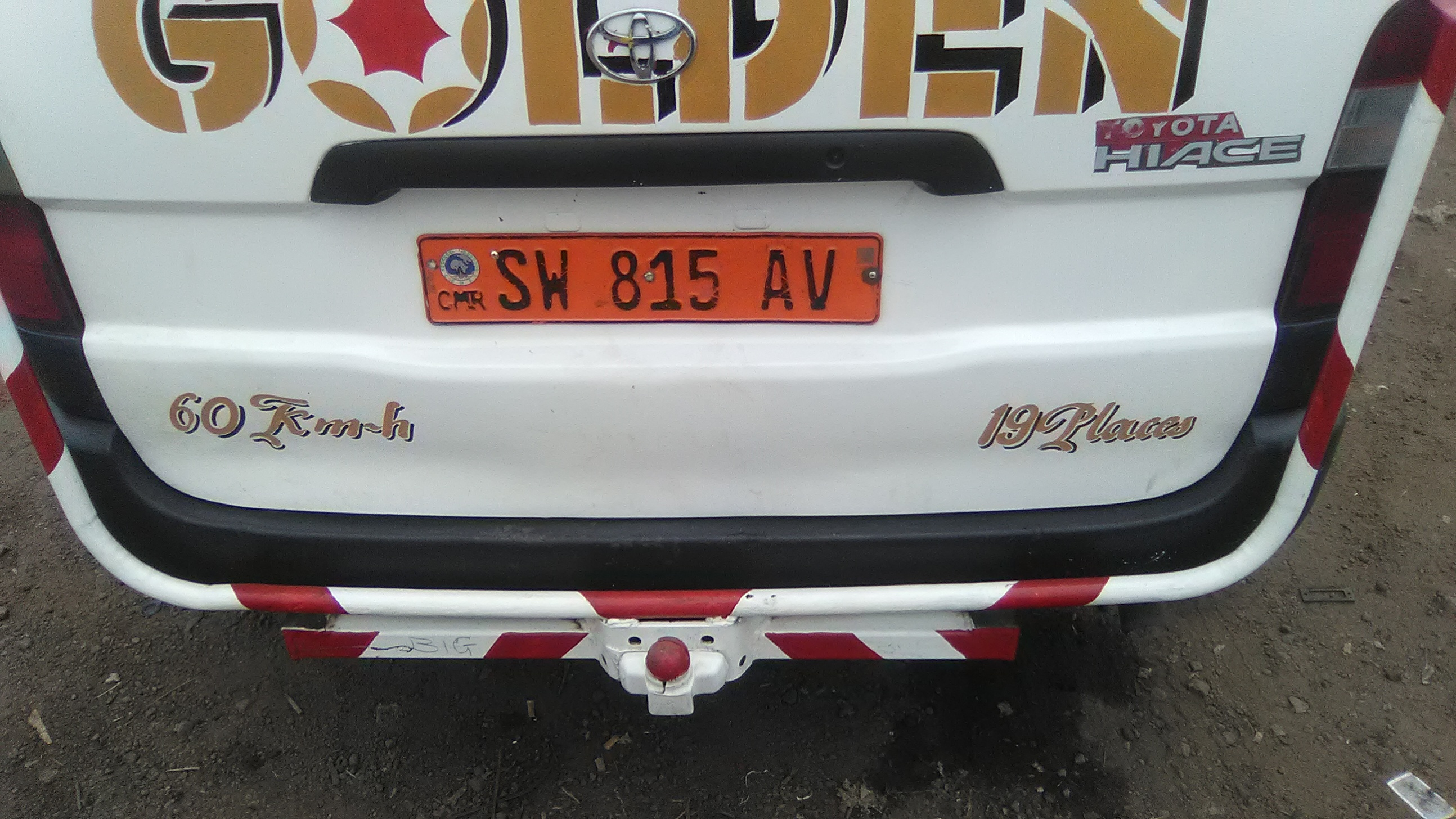
SW : South West

== Other formats ==
=== Number plate ===
Cameroon uses number plates made of custom combinations containing information at the request of the owner of the vehicle. These license plates have a 1XXXXXAB2 format, where 1 is the number prefix, XXXXX is an individual combination, AB is the region code, and 2 is the number suffix. The plates have an orange background with black marks, in addition to the same two emblems as regular plates.

=== Cargo transport ===
Cargo trucks use formats AB1234VH or ABXX1234E, where AB is the region code, SH is the pointer type, 1234 is the number, and E is the series. These plates have the same basic design as the regular plates and number plates. Pointer types have the following values:

- RR - trailers
- SE - self-propelled construction machinery and agricultural tractors
- SR - trailers
- TR - road tractors

=== State transport ===
State transport license plates use the format AB1234X where AB is the index (AN - National Assembly, CA - Housing Administration), 1234 is the number, and B is the series. These plates have a white background and black characters, with the two emblems on the left.

=== Postal service ===
The number plate format for the postal service is RT123456, where RT is Post and Telecommunications, 1234 is the number, and 56 is the series. The plates have black characters on a white background.

=== Military transport ===
License plate numbers for Cameroon military units are formatted as 1234567 with a yellow background and black characters. On the left side of the plate is an affixed logo formation. The first figure, the French custom, shows the branch of the military.

- 2 - Military police
- 3 - Army
- 4 - Air Force

=== Police ===
Since 1985, police have indexes on the license plates of the SN1234 format, where SN is the national security index and 1234 is the number. Plates have white characters on a red background.

=== Diplomatic plates ===
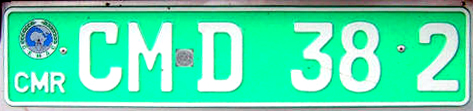
Cameroonian diplomatic license plates

The diplomatic license plates are encoded as belonging to a specific country or organization. For missions, codes are used in the range of 2–99, and for international organizations, the codes are in the range of 102–199.
