= Chief of Staff of the Cameroonian Armed Forces =

Highest ranking position in the Armed Forces of Cameroon

Chief of the Defence Staff
- Chef d'État-major des Forces armées
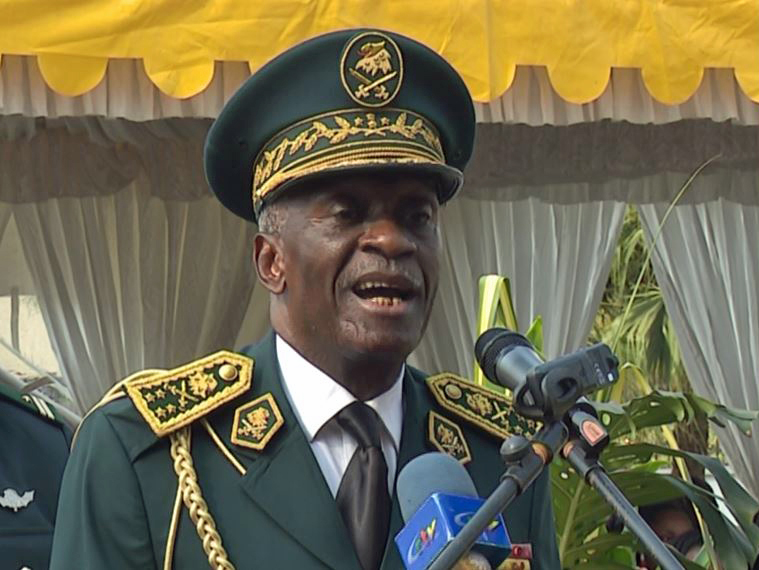
- Incumbent; Army corps general René Claude Meka since September 2001
- Reports to: Minister of Defence
- Appointer: President
- Constituting instrument: Presidential Decree No. 2001/182
- Website: Official website

The Chief of the Defence Staff (French: Chef d'État-major des Forces armées camerounaises) is the professional head of the Cameroon Armed Forces. They are responsible for the administration and operational control of the military.

== List of officeholders ==
No.	Portrait	Name (born–died)	Term of office			Ref.
No.	Portrait	Name (born–died)	Took office	Left office	Time in office	Ref.
1		Army corps general Pierre Semengue (born 1935)	1961	September 2001	39–40 years	
2		Army corps general René Claude Meka (born 1939)	September 2001	Incumbent	25 years	
