= Philip Njaru =

Cameroonian investigative journalist

Philip Afuson Njaru (b. 1966, d. 27 Aug 2022) was a Cameroonian investigative journalist. He has been internationally recognised for his work, but has faced widespread harassment from local authorities in his home country. In September 2008 he applied for political asylum in Norway.

== Work ==
His harassment began in May 1997, when the Chief of Post for the Immigration Police in Ekondo-Titi, a town close to the Nigerian border, responded to Njaru's allegations of various corruption by warning Njaru "that he would 'deal with him', should he continue to publish 'unpatriotic' articles, accusing police officers of corruption and alleging that constable P.N.E. had raped a pregnant Nigerian woman". According to Njaru's statement, he was eventually kicked and beaten to unconsciousness by the Chief of Post in October 1997. Complaints to the local authorities were fruitless because "his complaint had disappeared from the Registry". In February 1998, Njaru, hospitalised, was approached by the constable P.N.E., who arrested him, threatened him and slapped his face.

Njaru spent parts of 1998 in hiding in Bekora Barombi. He was found and approached by the constable P.N.E.

Around May 1999, Njaru wrote a newspaper article where he alleged ill-treatment of civilians conducted by the 11th Navy Battalion based in Ekondo-Titi. In late May Njaru was approached by the local captain who asked Njaru "to stop writing such articles and to disclose his sources". Refusing to do this, Njaru five days later found his house encircled by armed soldiers, and escaped to Kumba. Here, he was assaulted by police in June 2001, with no particular reason stated. Njaru complained to the local authorities, but later learned that "his complaint had not been received".

Later, while still living in the Southwest Province, Njaru was threatened again in October and December 2003.

In 2006, he was accused by local police of working for the Southern Cameroons National Council, a Southern Cameroons secessionist organisation. He was arrested on a bus, beaten and his gear confiscated, according to a piece written by former executive director of the World Press Freedom Committee Marilyn Greene.

In August 2008, Njaru wrote a long complaint about alleged police fraud, arbitrary arrests and extortion of Nigerian immigrants, again in the town of Kumba.

=== International attention ===
In 2005 Njaru filed a case to the United Nations Human Rights Committee, evoking the International Covenant on Civil and Political Rights and citing "unlawful arrest, ill-treatment and torture, threats from public authorities and failure to investigate" as the reasons for his complaint. The committee found that Cameroon (the state party) failed to co-operate, not responding regarding the substance of Njaru's claims. Citing previous cases, the committee found that Njaru's claims should be given weight. Concluding the case in 2007, the committee commented "that the author [Njaru] is entitled (...) to an effective remedy" and that the state of Cameroon "is under an obligation to ensure that similar violations do not occur in the future".

He was also mentioned specifically in Amnesty International's 2008 country report on Cameroon, as one case in a series of concerns about the human rights in Cameroon.

He has won "multiple international awards" for his investigative journalism, among others the 2002 PEN-Novib Award, given by International PEN and NOVIB for "brave efforts to resist censorship". He was also given the Hellman-Hammett Grant in 2003 by Human Rights Watch.

== Defection attempt ==
In September 2008 he travelled to the Global Investigative Journalism Conference in Lillehammer, Norway. He represented Ocean City Radio, for which he had worked the past six years. He had previously been invited to the 2007 edition of the conference, held in Toronto, but was denied entrance into Canada. However, although there were suspicions that Njaru might defect during the conference, no objections were raised towards his entrance into Norway. On the night before the last day of the conference, he applied for political asylum in Norway. According to Njoru himself, he had a "90% chance" of getting murdered if returning to Cameroon. Commenting on the United Nations Human Rights Committee report, which called upon a remedy as well as future protection, Njaru stated that nothing had happened in this respect.

Njaru was subsequently granted asylum in Norway, settling in the southern city of Arendal.
