= Greentree Agreement =

Treaty between Cameroon and Nigeria

Greentree Agreement
- Signed: 12 June 2006
- Location: Greentree, Manhasset, New York
- Signatories: Republic of Cameroon and the Federal Republic of Nigeria
- Language: English

The Greentree Agreement is a formal treaty which resolved the Cameroon–Nigeria border dispute over the oil and natural gas-rich Bakassi peninsula. The dispute had roots as far back as 1913; in 1981, 1994, and 1996 armed clashes between Nigeria and Cameroon took place in Bakassi. The dispute was referred to the International Court of Justice and on 10 October 2002 the ICJ ruled in favor of Cameroon.

On 12 June 2006, Nigerian President Olusegun Obasanjo and Cameroonian President Paul Biya signed the Greentree Agreement concerning the withdrawal of troops and transfer of authority in the peninsula. The withdrawal of Nigerian troops was set for 60 days but allowed for a possible 30-day extension while Nigeria was allowed to keep its civil administration and police in Bakassi for another two years.

A special transitional administration was to follow. A committee composed of representatives from Cameroon, Nigeria, the UN, Germany, the US, France and the UK, was created to monitor the implementation of the agreement.

On 13 August 2013, the United Nations Security Council stated that it welcomed the peaceful end two days earlier of the special transitional regime in the Bakassi Peninsula.
