= René Claude Meka =

Chief of Staff of the Cameroon Armed Forces

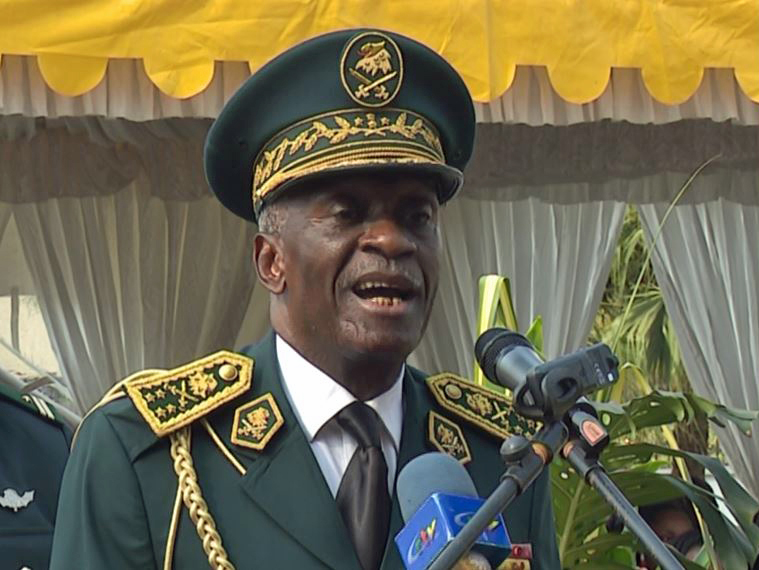
- Meka in 2019
- Born: 2 February 1939 (age 87); Enongal, near Ebolowa, French Cameroon
- Military career
- Allegiance: Cameroon
- Branch: Cameroon Armed Forces
- Service years: 1962–present
- Rank: Chief of the General Staff
- Conflicts: Anglophone Crisis; Bakassi Peninsula

René Claude Meka (born 2 February 1939) is a senior Cameroonian officer and Chief of Staff of the Cameroon Armed Forces since September 2001.

== Biography ==
Meka was born on 2 February 1939, in Enongal near Ebolowa. He graduated from the École spéciale militaire de Saint-Cyr in 1962 and from infantry school of Saint-Maixent in 1963.

During the border dispute between Cameroon and Nigeria over the Bakassi Peninsula, Meka was tasked with securing the territory by deploying the Rapid Intervention Brigade.
