= Cameroon Armed Forces =

Military of the Republic of Cameroon

- Forces armées camerounaises (FAC)
- Founded: 1960
- Service branches: Army; Air Force; Navy; Fire Fighter Corps; Gendarmerie
- Headquarters: Yaoundé

Leadership
- Commander-in-Chief: Paul Biya
- Deputy Commander-in-Chief: Joseph Ngute
- Minister of Defense: Joseph Beti Assomo
- Chief of Staff: René Claude Meka

Personnel
- Active personnel: 38000 (plus 9000 gendarmerie and paramilitary)

Expenditure
- Budget: FCFA 324 billion
- Percent of GDP: 1

Industry
- Foreign suppliers: Brazil; China; European Union; France; India; Indonesia; Israel; Russia; Singapore; Switzerland; Serbia; South Africa; Japan; Vietnam; United Arab Emirates; United States; United Kingdom

Related articles
- History: Bamileke War; Bakassi conflict CAR Civil War; Boko Haram insurgency Anglophone Crisis
- Ranks: Military ranks of Cameroon

The Cameroon Armed Forces (French: Forces armées camerounaises (FAC)) are the military of the Republic of Cameroon. It has three branches – the army, air force, and navy – and the gendarmerie.

It has generally remained loyal to the government and acted to ensure the stability of the regime, and not acted as an independent political force. Traditional dependence on the French defense capability, although reduced, continues to be the case as French military advisers remain closely involved in preparing the Cameroonian forces for deployment to the contested Bakassi Peninsula.

The African Union maintains its continental logistics base in Douala.

== Army ==
The army has 35,500 troops.

Currently, the organization dates from 2001 with a distribution in several types of units: combat units, response units (unités d'intervention), unités de soutien et d'appui, and finally special reserve units as part of 3 joint military régions (interarmées) and the 10 military land sectors.

Army units have been trained and equipped to fight in the swampy coastal terrain facing the Bakassi peninsula. Although prepared for an armed conflict with Nigeria in recent years, the Cameroon Army does not have operational experience against other forces, therefore, it is not possible to assess its ability to respond to changing threats and opposing tactics.

Combat units of the army include:

- The Headquarters Brigade, located in Yaoundé. This brigade is responsible for protecting the capital and supporting the institutions. The President of the Republic has to allow any of its deployments. The brigade consists of acommand and support battalion; a support battalion; a bataillon honneurs et protection (BHP); and three infantry battalions.
- Three command and support battalions;
- The Rapid Intervention Brigade (Brigade d'Intervention Rapide, BIR) is made up of three rapid response battalions, stationed in Douala, Tiko and Koutaba. These three battalions are respectively the Special Amphibious Battalion (Bataillon Spécial Amphibie; BSA), the Bataillon des Troupes Aéroportées (BTAP), and the Armored Reconnaissance Battalion (Bataillon Blindé de Reconnaissance; BBR) equipped with Type 07P infantry fighting vehicle and PTL-02 tank destroyer bought recently from China. The BSA is inspired by the French Special Forces. This brigade is a tactical battle unit under the authority of the Chief of Staff of the armed forces. For this to be engaged, the President's agreement is necessary.
- Five motorised infantry brigades, supposed to be stationed in one military sector but which can then be engaged without any regard to the territorial division of the country. These brigades currently do not have a general staff. In theory, they consist of 11 motorised infantry battalions; 5 support battalions and 3 backing battalions; however, the motorised battalions are in reality not operational due to a lack of staff, equipment and vehicles.

=== Organization ===
The territory is divided into 5 combined arms military regions (RMIA):

- RMIA1 (Yaoundé)
- RMIA2 (Douala)
- RMIA3 (Garoua)
- RMIA4 (Maroua)

=== 1st Military Region ===
- 11th Ebolowa Brigade:
  - 11th BCS (command and support battalion) in Ebolowa
  - 12th BIM (motorized infantry battalion) in Ebolowa
  - 12th BIM at Djoum
  - 13th BIM at Ambam
  - 11th BA (support battalion) at Sangmélima
- 12th Bertoua brigade
  - 12th BCS in Bertoua
  - 14th BIM in Bertoua
  - 15th BIM to Yokadouma
  - 16th BIM at Garoua-Boulaï
  - 12th BA in Bertoua

=== 2nd Military Region ===
- Rapid Intervention Brigade
  - Headquarters at Bafoussam
  - Special Amphibious Battalion (BSA) at Tiko
  - Airborne Battalion (BTAP) in Koutaba
  - Armored Reconnaissance Battalion (BBR) in Douala
- 21st Motorized infantry brigade of Buéa
  - 21st BCS in Buéa
  - 21 BIM in Buéa
  - 22nd BIM at Mamfé
  - 23rd BIM at Loum
  - 24th BIM at Akwaya
  - 21st BA in Kumba
- 201st Douala Air Base
  - 21st Air Transport Squadron
  - 211th Transport and Assault Transport Squadron
  - 212th Transport and Assault Transport Squadron
  - 22nd Air Squadron
  - 221st Transport and Assault Transport Squadron
  - 222nd Reconnaissance Squadron

=== Equipment ===
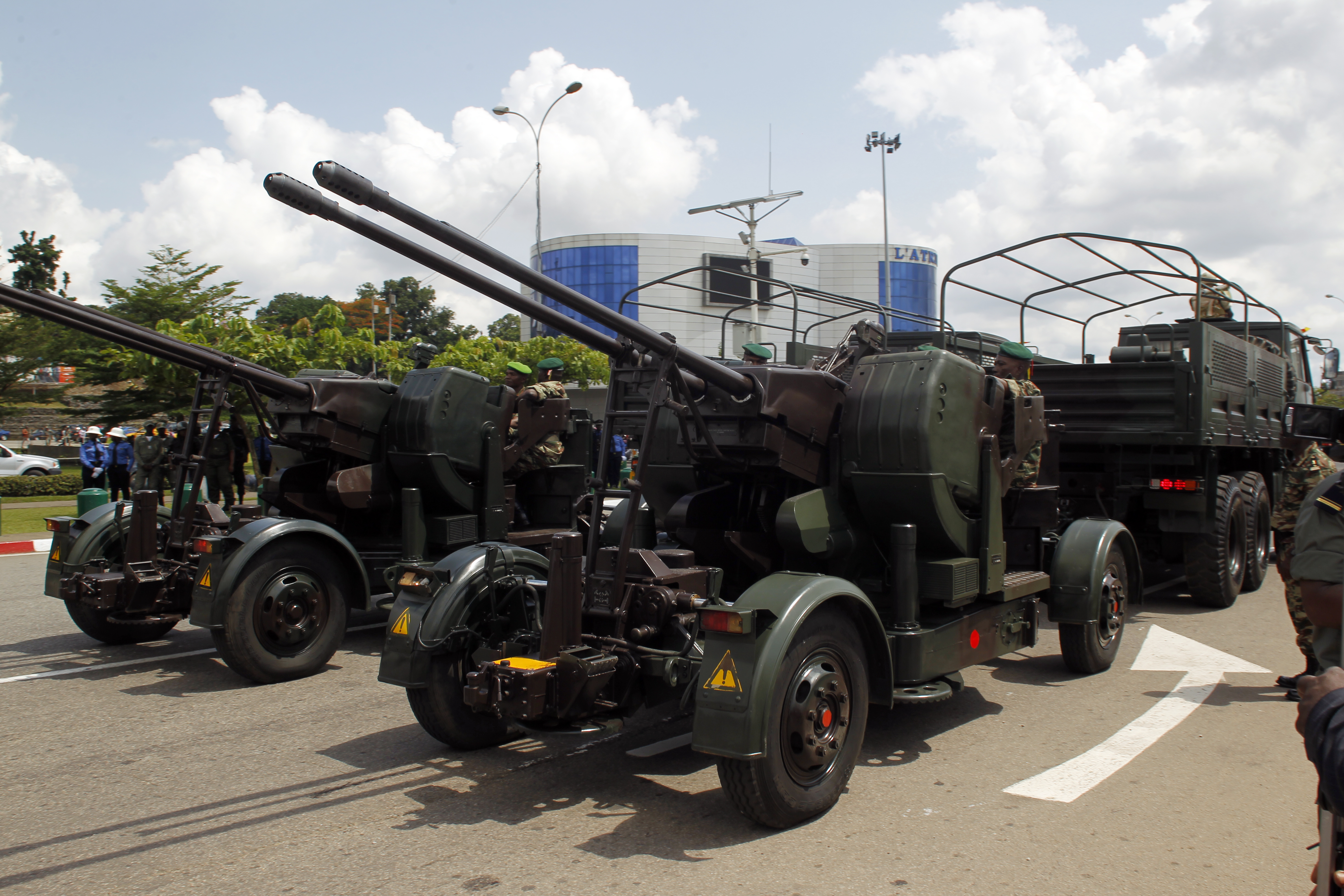
Oerlikon GDF of the Cameroon Armed Forces in 2016.

== Air force ==
The air force has 1,000 troops, including one security battalion. Its combat capable fixed-wing aircraft are six Dassault/Dornier Alpha Jets, although they may not be serviceable.

== Navy ==
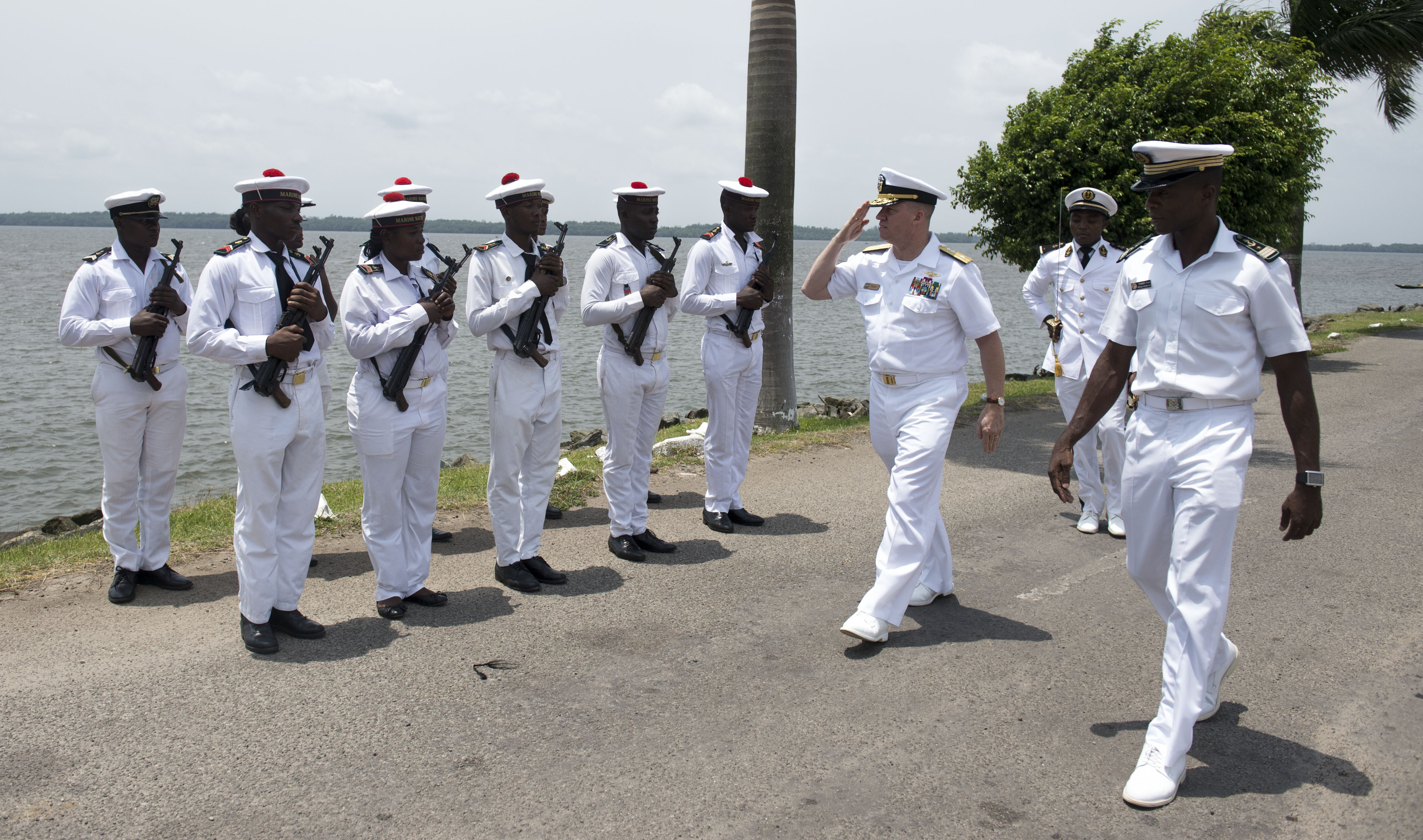
Cameroonian sailors reviewed by an American admiral in Douala, 2015.

The navy has approximately 1,500 troops, including a three marine battalions. The headquarters is in Douala.

=== History ===
Around May 1999, Philip Njaru wrote a newspaper article where he alleged ill-treatment of civilians conducted by the 21st Navy Battalion based in Ekondo-Titi. In late May Njaru was approached by the local captain who asked Njaru "to stop writing such articles and to disclose his sources". Refusing to do this, Njaru five days later found his house encircled by armed soldiers, and escaped to Kumba. Here, he was assaulted by police in June 2001, with no particular reason stated. Njaru complained to the local authorities, but later learned that "his complaint had not been received".

=== Equipment ===
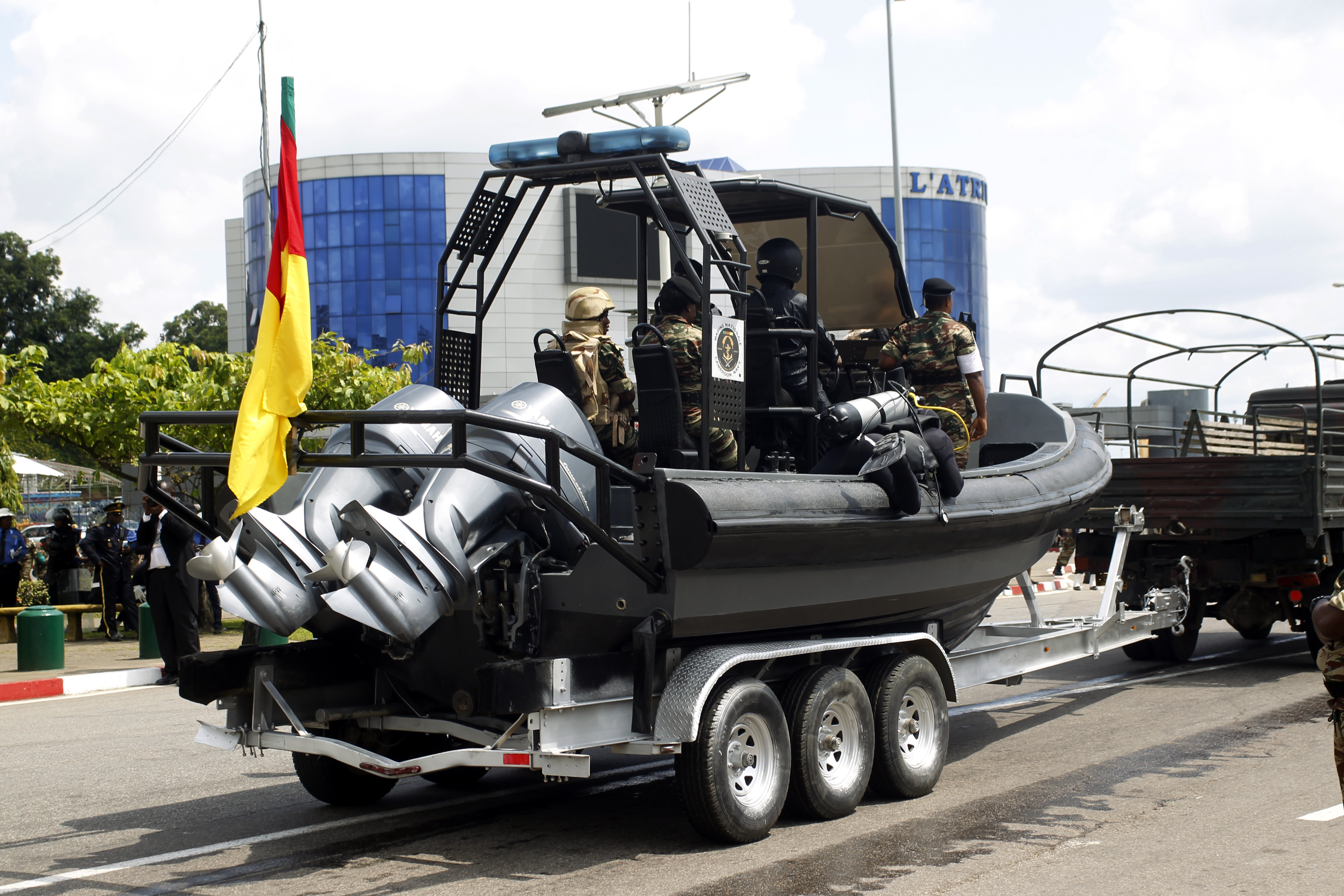
Cameroon Navy patrol boat during a military parade in Douala, 2019

The navy has 14 patrol and coastal ships, and five landing craft.

== Gendarmerie ==
The paramilitary Gendarmerie has 9,000 troops.

== Military education ==
The Combined Services Military Academy (EMIA) is the military college for officer candidates and senior officers. It was founded in 1959 and opened in 1961.

== Sources ==
- International Institute for Strategic Studies, ed. (2025). The Military Balance 2025. London: Routledge. ISBN 978-1-041-04967-8.
