= Rapid Intervention Brigade =

- Brigade d'Intervention Rapide
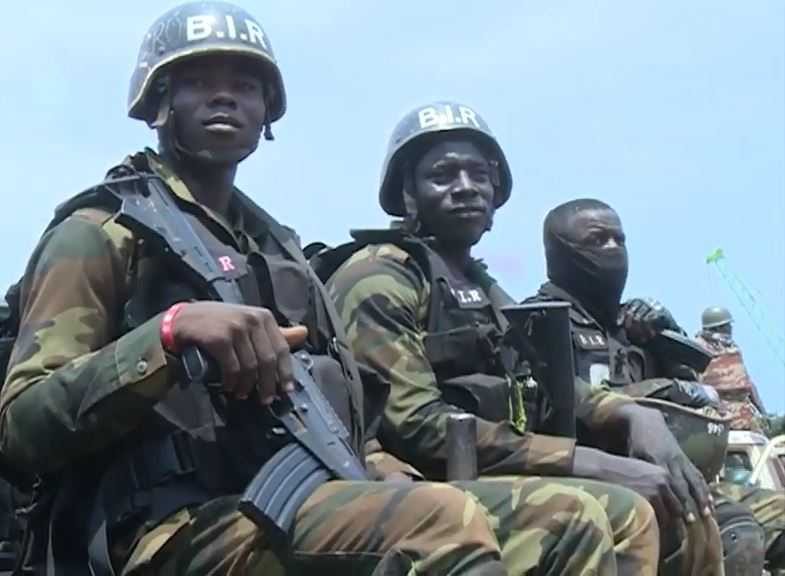
- BIR soldiers in Bamenda, Northwest Region, 2019.
- Active: 1999 (as BLI); 2001 (as BIR)
- Country: Cameroon
- Role: Counterinsurgency, light infantry, combined arms
- Size: Brigade (5,000–7,000 soldiers)
- Engagements: Boko Haram insurgency Anglophone Crisis

Commanders
- BIR General Coordinator: Brigadier General Pelene Francois

The Rapid Intervention Brigade, also called the Rapid Intervention Battalion (French: Brigade or Bataillon d'Intervention Rapide, BIR) is a light infantry and combined arms unit of the Cameroonian Armed Forces. The BIR was founded to assist the police in protecting Cameroon's borders with the Central African Republic, Chad, and Nigeria, where heavily armed rebel groups looted vehicles, held passengers hostage for ransom, and stole cattle.

The BIR is better equipped, trained and paid than ordinary units in Cameroon's army. The unit is led by a retired Israeli officer and reports directly to the president of Cameroon, instead of to the ministry of defense. The BIR has worked closely with the US military since 2007 or earlier. Its main responsibilities include counter-insurgency, counter-terrorism, and anti-banditry. A part of the BIR's objectives includes controlling the illegal circulation of arms. The BIR has also been cited by poachers and ivory traders as a threat to illegal trade in animal goods.

In 2012, the BIR deployed a "permanent" force to Bouba Njida National Park in northern Cameroon to protect elephants from poachers. The unit is supported by the United States and Israel as part of the efforts against Islamic extremism in the Sahel, and has played a large part in the Cameroonian and regional war against Boko Haram. Since Cameroon joined the Multinational Joint Task Force against the Boko Haram insurgency, BIR troops have waged operations under its legal authority. In 2016 they destroyed two of Boko Haram's main training bases in Nigeria.

The unit is organized as a brigade of 5,000 to 7,000 soldiers, with five or six battalions. It has been noted for its effectiveness against bandits and militant groups, but it has also become known for committing human rights violations. The BIR routinely uses excessive force and often does not distinguish between insurgents and civilians. It has been accused of torturing and killing detainees at a number of its bases in northern Cameroon and in Nigeria, oppressing ethnic minority groups during the Anglophone Crisis, and violently putting down protests against the government, while acting as the personal force of President Paul Biya.

== History ==
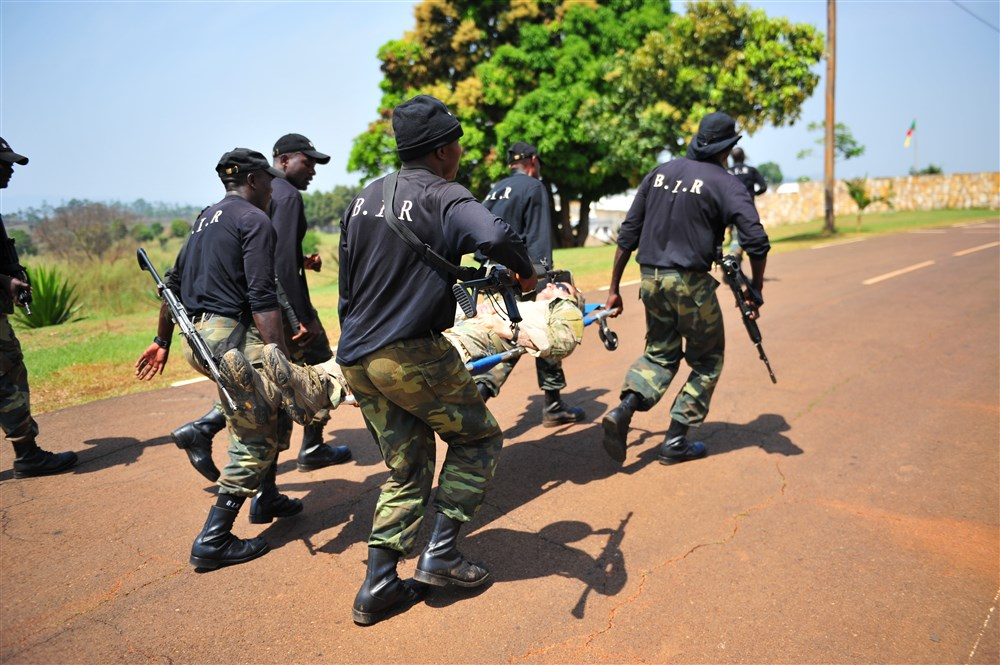
Soldiers of BIR during exercise Silent Warrior 2013 in Bamenda, Northwest Region, Cameroon, Jan. 29, 2013.

The unit was first created in 1999, known as the Light Intervention Battalion (Bataillon Léger d'Intervention, BLI), under retired Israeli colonel and defence attaché to Cameroon, Avi Sivan Abraham. Its creation was intended to address the increase in highway banditry in northern Cameroon since the 1980s, when civil wars in neighboring Chad and the Central African Republic led to former rebels joining local gangs. Cameroon's National Gendarmerie struggled to counter the rise in crime.

The BLI quickly became known for fighting and reducing highway bandit activity In 2001, it was expanded into a brigade as the BIR, with three elite and highly mobile rapid intervention battalions, each assigned to one of Cameroon's regular military regions. Since then, President Paul Biya has deployed BIR battalions to different areas, responding to internal and external threats. It grew to a strength of 5,000 as of 2015, and 7,000 as of 2018.

In 2012, 600 soldiers and a helicopter of the BIR were deployed to Bouba Njida National Park in northern Cameroon to stop the poaching of elephants for their ivory, after 300 elephants were killed by Sudanese poachers. The commanding general in the region said that the BIR will have a permanent presence there to assist park rangers in stopping the foreign poaching gangs, who were armed with military-grade weaponry. The deployment reportedly led to a decrease in poaching.

In 2016, the BIR participated in the United States Africa Command-sponsored Exercise Obangame and Saharan Express wargames, meant to increase regional military cooperation between central African nations and the United States. The BIR hosted a significant portion of the exercises, involving 32 nations including the UK, France and Germany, at its base in Idenau.

In 2018, the BIR was deployed to fight separatists in the Southwest regions of Cameroon.

=== Operation Alpha ===
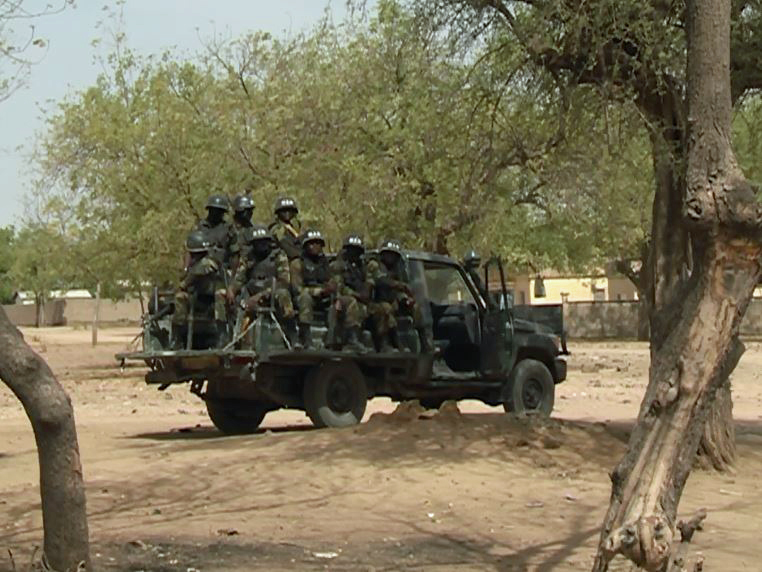
Rapid Intervention Battalion in Maroua, Far North Region, Cameroon, Jan. 17, 2019.

In May 2014, after an attack by Boko Haram on a construction site of the Chinese company Sinohydro, the BIR has launched Operation Alpha, a counterterrorism campaign that has received international support. The operation's efforts have been central to the war waged by Cameroon, Nigeria, Niger and Chad against Boko Haram. BIR-Alpha and its regular Cameroonian Army counterpart, Emergence-4, led by the 4th military region (RMIA 4), represented "relatively effective security measures" against Boko Haram. When Cameroon joined the Multinational Joint Task Force in October 2015, this enabled BIR troops to operate in Nigeria, under the code-name "Arrow". The MNJTF command in N'Djamena, Chad, had no authority over BIR, but the unit cooperated with the MNJTF contingent, such as in Nigeria.

The BIR-Alpha operation's headquarters are in Salak. According to Amnesty International, Salak is also used as an illegal prison to house persons detained by the BIR. In 2014 about 1,000 BIR soldiers were deployed along the border with Nigeria, where "dozens" of them were killed during fighting with Boko Haram. Between November 2015 and May 2016, the unit carried out eight "Arrow" operations in Nigeria, destroying two of the group's main training bases and reportedly killing over two hundred Boko Haram fighters, in cooperation with the Nigerian military. In 2016, approximately 1,000 BIR soldiers were reported to have captured the town of Kumshe, Nigeria from Boko Haram. The BIR also conducted operations from the border town of Fotokol in Nigeria, where it converted a closed school into a military base.

Since the start of Operation Alpha, the BIR has seen extensive use against Boko Haram, representing one-third of the Cameroonian troops deployed against the group. It has opened bases in Amchide and Fotokol.

== Organization ==
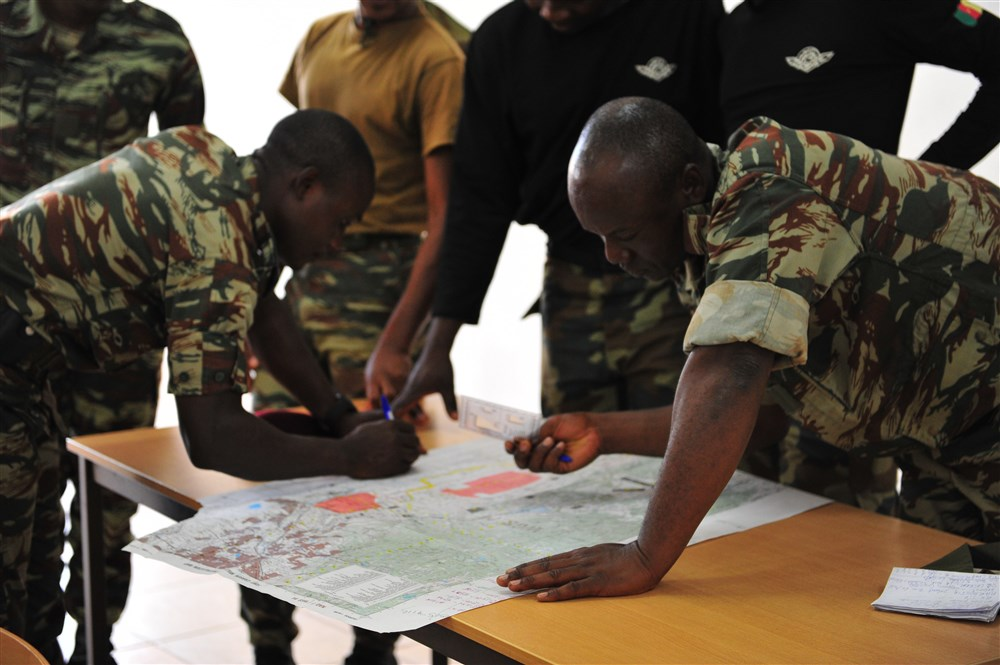
BIR soldiers planning land navigation exercises during Silent Warrior-2013.

The BIR nominally operates under the command of the Chief of Staff of the Armed Forces (CEMA). The unit is called if law enforcement is unable to contain a hostile situation, and is intended for counterinsurgency, counterterrorism, and anti-banditry operations.

Its command structure bypasses both the Chief of Staff of the Armed Forces and the Minister of Defense, as the BIR commander and general coordinator answers directly to the office of the President of the Republic. The entire budget of the BIR is provided by Cameroon's state-owned oil company, and is separate from the regular military budget, allowing it to have a qualitative superiority over the regular army. Its close connection to the president, Paul Biya, has made it "the regime's specialized, autonomous, and primary coercive instrument, deployed where counter-insurgency and maximum force are indispensable." The BIR has also been used to suppress protests. The BIR's deployments to rural areas and the far north of Cameroon indicate that the unit's role is still primarily counter-insurgency.

Colonel Abraham remained the commander of the BIR until his death in a helicopter crash in 2010, at which point he was replaced by Israeli general Mayer Heres. By 2017 Heres delegated command to his Cameroonian deputy, Brigadier General Bouba Dobékréo, but remained influential. As of October 2025, the unit was commanded by Brigadier General Pelene Francois, a Cameroonian veteran of anti-bandit and anti-Boko Haram operations.

=== Structure ===
The BIR consists of 5,000 to 7,000 soldiers organized into five or six battalions. In addition to two or three rapid intervention battalions, they include the following units:

- Airborne Troops Battalion (BTAP)
- Special Amphibious Battalion (BSA)
- Armoured Reconnaissance Battalion of the General Reserve

Its basic tactical element is a 1,000-man combined-arms light intervention unit (UIL), which is assembled from standing formations. UILs have attached armor, artillery, intelligence, and aviation elements, the latter including Mi-24 gunships. The BIR has been described as benefiting from a decentralized command structure, reportedly increasing its agility and adaptability, and from taking advantage of its airmobile and artillery capabilities.

Researcher Michael Shurkin compared the BIR's tactical and operative flexibility to "Rhodesian, South African, and Israeli operations in the 1970s and 1980s." He cited it as an example of an effective counterinsurgency unit in Africa, while also noting its record of human rights violations.

=== Requirements ===
The BIR recruits male Cameroonians from 18 to 23 years old with evidence of a Certificate of Primary Studies (CEP), a First School Leaving Certificate (FSLC), or an equivalent diploma. Candidates are required to have a height of 1.66 m tall (5.4 ft).

=== Foreign support ===
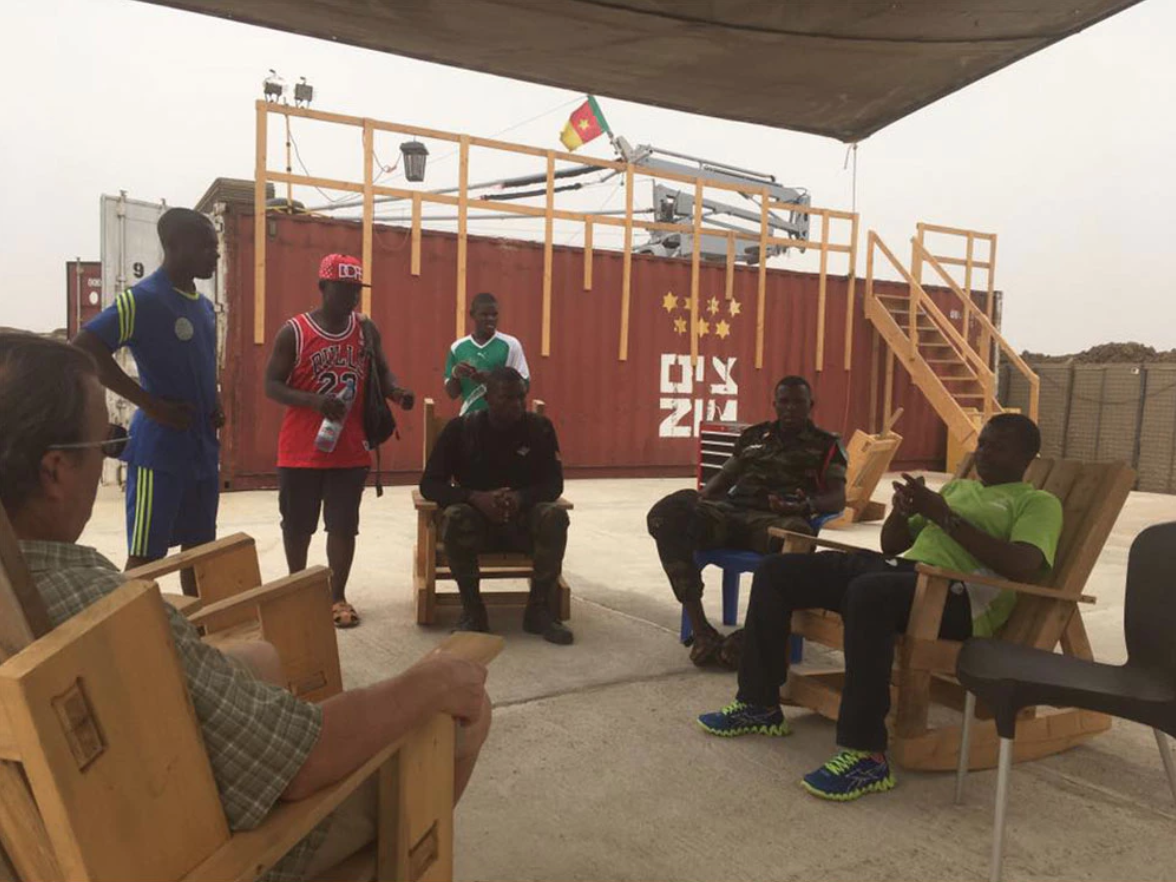
BIR soldiers speak with American military advisors at their military base in Salak, Cameroon.

The BIR has received equipment and training from the United States and Israel. The unit worked with Israeli special forces when it was first raised. Some of their training include urban warfare and krav maga. The BIR has received Western assistance since the mid-2000s, including also from France and Britain, and the amount of aid increased after Cameroon joined the war against Boko Haram. In 2015 and 2016, the US gave US$15.9 million and $13.5 million, respectively, in train-and-equip support to the BIR; by 2019 around 300 US troops were providing annual training. In 2025, the US agreed to send the BIR armored personnel carriers worth $35 million as part of a third-country deportation deal.

In the spring of 2016, US Ambassador to Cameroon Michael Hoza praised the unit, stating, "In their training, conduct, and leadership, the BIR exhibited all of the values we expect in our own armed forces — professionalism, protection of the civilian population, and respect for human rights." The US military has confirmed that works with the BIR in the fight against Boko Haram, and has stated that approximately 300 US military personnel are working with the BIR at any given time. Michael Page, a former US state department and intelligence analyst, has described the BIR as a Cameroonian "army within-an-army" for the United States. General Thomas Waldhauser of U.S. Africa Command called it "the top-shelf counterterrorism unit inside Cameroon".

== Controversies ==
Amnesty International has accused the BIR of torturing detainees, supporting these accusations with leaked videos of soldiers wearing BIR uniforms and torturing detainees. The organization has stated that the detainees are primarily men of military age, Muslim, and of Kanuri ethnicity, but that women and children have also been held. Both men and women have been tortured. Tortured detainees have testified that American soldiers were present at BIR bases where they were detained. Every year since 2010, the US State Department has issued a report accusing the BIR of human rights abuses including killings and assaults.

In 2017, the U.S. Army began an inquiry into the torture allegations at the request of General Thomas Waldhauser, the commander of AFRICOM. The State Department made cuts in 2019 for around $17 million in security assistance.

Footage analyzed by BBC Africa Eye has shown BIR soldiers burning a house down in the Azi village of Southwest Region in 2018. Cameroon's Communication Minister Issa Tchiroma Bakary denied that the men were actually BIR soldiers, instead claiming that they were separatists in captured uniforms. An OSINT investigation by individuals associated with bellingcat, and Amnesty International, linked the BIR to the execution of women and children, believed to be in Mayo-Tsanaga.

== See also ==
- Boko Haram insurgency
- Anglophone Crisis
