= Law enforcement in Cameroon =

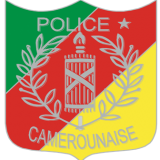
Patch of the Cameroon National Police

Police forces are seen deployed at the Kondengui Central Prison in Yaounde.

The Gendarmerie Nationale and the National Police of Cameroon were founded in 1928 during French rule. They are responsible for civilian law enforcement in Cameroon.
