= Cross River skin-covered masks =

Animal-hide-covered masquerade crests of Nigeria and Cameroon

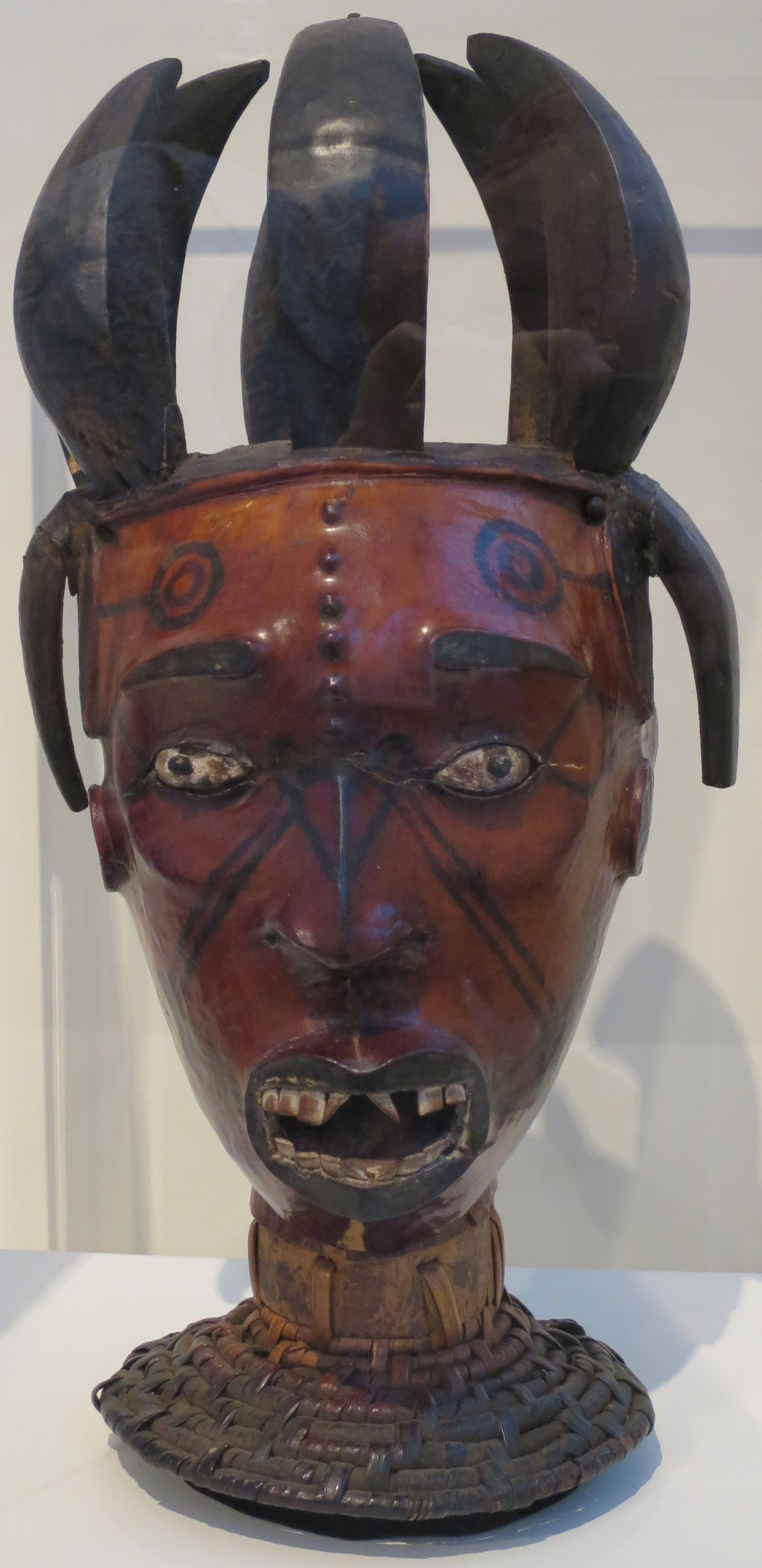
A 20th-century skin-covered headdress attributed to the Ejagham or a related Cross River community. The basketry flange joined the crest to the dancer's costume.

Cross River skin-covered masks are carved wooden dance crests sheathed in prepared animal hide and made in the Cross River region of south-eastern Nigeria and south-western Cameroon. The tradition is associated especially with Ejagham, Efik, Boki, Anyang, Banyang, Mbembe, Yakö and Widekum communities, while related forms have circulated among eastern Ibibio, Igbo, Idoma and Cameroon Grassfields peoples. Most examples are cap crests worn above the dancer's head or heavier helmets enclosing it; in performance, the sculpted object forms only the visible summit of a larger ensemble of cloth or raffia, music, movement, attendants and spectators.

Human heads—single, opposed, or multiplied around a helmet—are the best-known subjects. Artists also made crests representing antelopes, crocodiles, rams, monkeys and composite beings. Fresh hide was stretched over a carved core and allowed to shrink tightly as it dried. Cane, wood or metal could form teeth; reflective metal or glass could enliven the eyes; hair, quills, feathers, horns, pigments, oil and resin completed the surface. The resulting combination of pliable skin and sharply articulated carving supported effects ranging from idealised beauty to skeletal or deliberately fearsome exaggeration.

The crests belonged to institutions rather than functioning as autonomous sculptures. Graded leopard associations, warrior and hunting groups, age grades, funeral associations, women's organisations and entertainment clubs commissioned, stored and performed them. Their appearances could mark initiations and funerals, celebrate achievement, display rank, dramatise moral oppositions, or provide public entertainment. A recurrent performance contrast paired composed, finely dressed “beauty” characters with dark, erratic or aggressive “beast” characters.

European collectors acquired Cross River examples by 1843. Early catalogues commonly labelled them “Calabar” after the coastal entrepôt or “Ekoi” after one regional population; later scholarship adopted “Cross River” to acknowledge their broader, mobile history. Reports that some crests were covered with human skin have contributed to their notoriety, but the claim has not been demonstrated for the studied museum corpus. A 2014 technical examination of nineteen masks at the National Museum of African Art found a wider range of materials and methods than field accounts had suggested and assessed the sampled skins as likely antelope or similar animals.

== Terminology and geographic scope ==
Museum records use mask, headdress, crest mask and dance crest for overlapping classes of object. “Crest” is the most anatomically precise term for a form carried on the crown of the head, while “helmet mask” denotes a larger form that covers the head and may rest near the shoulders. In African art history, however, mask also denotes the complete performed entity: sculpted head, costume, dancer, movement, sound and the social authority that authorises its appearance. Treating a detached crest as the whole mask therefore reproduces the conditions of museum collection rather than the conditions of performance.

“Cross River” is a regional designation, the river basin that links coastal Calabar to forest communities on both sides of the modern Nigeria–Cameroon border. Among the principal makers and users identified in the literature are the Efik and eastern Ibibio in the lower river area; Ejagham, Akparabong and Boki communities in the middle region; and Anyang, Banyang, eastern Ejagham and Widekum communities farther north and east. Related forms occur beyond this core among some southern and north-eastern Igbo, Idoma, Bangwa and other neighbouring peoples.

The older ethnonym “Ekoi” remains frequent in museum catalogues. It has been used narrowly for Ejagham and loosely for several Ekoid-speaking or neighbouring communities, so an “Ekoi” attribution does not necessarily identify a maker's village. “Calabar” is equally ambiguous: it can indicate production in or near the port, collection there after downriver trade, or nothing more than an early dealer's label. Geographic, ethnic, association and artist attributions therefore require separate evaluation.

== Materials and manufacture ==
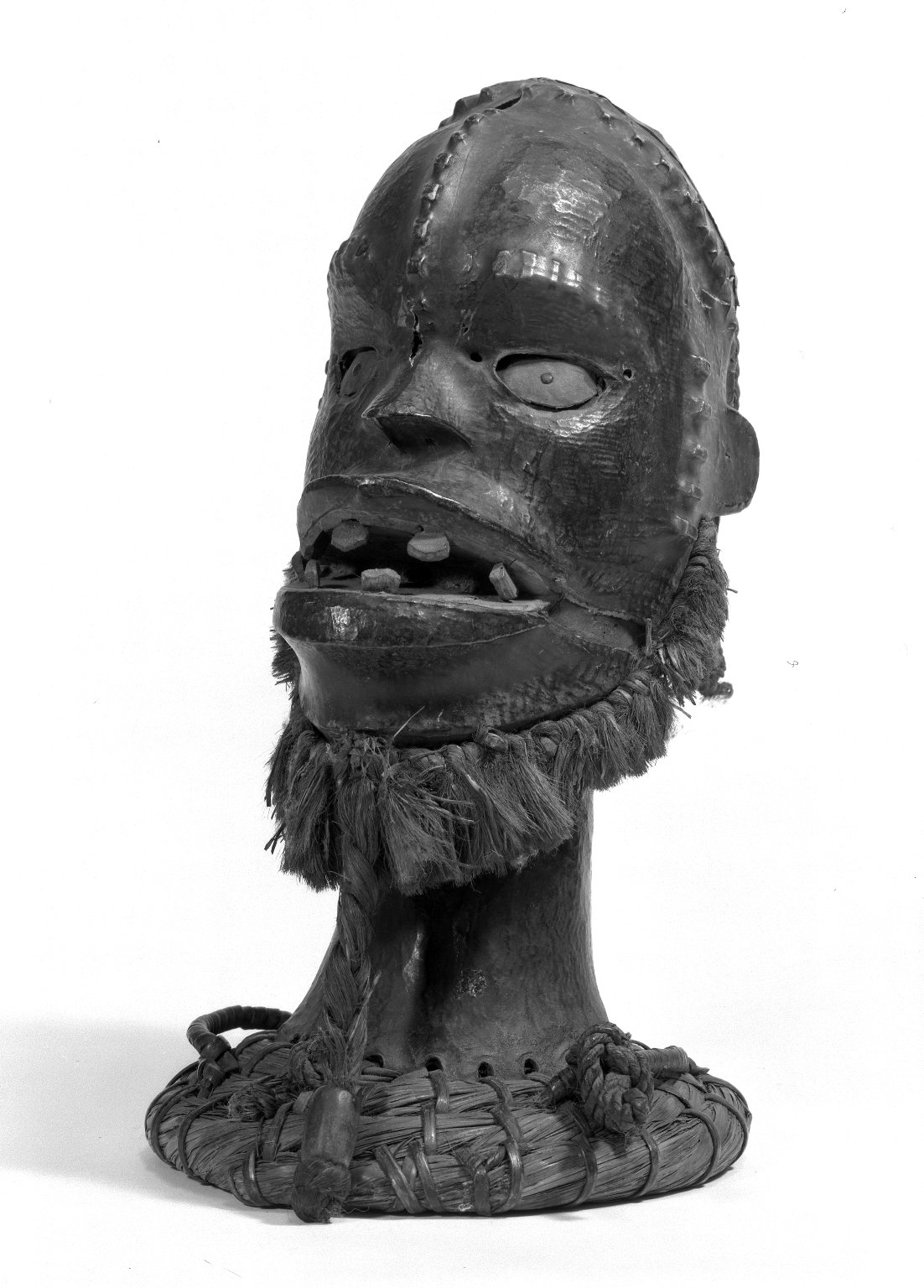
A late 19th- or early 20th-century headdress with a raffia beard, showing the contrast between the taut hide face and the fibrous costume element.

Manufacture began with a wooden core carved fully in the round. A cap crest was fitted to a shallow basketry flange that sat on the crown and could be tied beneath the chin or sewn into a costume. A helmet was hollowed to receive the wearer's head. Carvers had to anticipate the effect of the covering: shallow details could disappear when the hide contracted, whereas abrupt projections could tear it. Field documentation describes the wood being allowed to season before the covering stage.

Thin hide from a duiker or another antelope was preferred in many documented workshops. The hair was removed and the skin was soaked or otherwise softened. While still wet and flexible it was pulled over the core, pressed into facial hollows and secured along seams with cord, pegs, tacks or nails. Drying converted it into taut rawhide that followed the carved structure closely. The inner, fatty surface could assist adhesion, while shrinkage supplied much of the final tension.

The hide was not merely a neutral wrapping. Its seams, colour, thickness and grain affected the face, and skilled application avoided folds around ears, mouths and coiffures. Separate materials increased the illusion of a living or forceful presence. Teeth were cut from cane, palm midrib, wood, bone or metal; pupils might be metal or another shiny substance; wooden pegs or attached fibres represented hair. Actual antelope horns, feathers and porcupine quills could be inserted before a performance. Palm oil produced a dark, gleaming finish, while plant resins and pigments supplied red, black, ochre, white or blue details.

Some surfaces were repeatedly altered. Oil and fresh colour renewed a crest for display; worn skin could be patched; broken projections could be pinned; decorative materials could be replaced. These interventions complicate any attempt to identify a single “original” state. They also indicate that continued efficacy and legibility in performance could matter more than preserving the untouched work of an individual carver.

=== Animal species and human-skin claims ===
Early colonial writers connected skin-covered heads with warfare, head-taking and the display of trophies. Some later museum labels repeated claims of human hide, and the striking naturalism of the objects made the story attractive to collectors. The evidence is uneven. Historical sources document masks incorporating actual skulls and describe warrior associations that performed with trophy imagery, but neither fact establishes that wooden crests were routinely covered with human skin. G. I. Jones noted that investigations by K. F. Campbell did not confirm P. A. Talbot's assertion of human hide.

Owczarek's 2014 study combined visual examination, radiography, wood thin-section analysis, DNA analysis, portable X-ray fluorescence, X-ray diffraction and Fourier-transform infrared spectroscopy. The nineteen National Museum of African Art objects broadly supported field descriptions of construction but showed considerable variation in woods, coverings and surface applications. The skins were assessed as likely deriving from antelope or comparable animals, and the research did not validate a human-skin attribution for any object in the group. Because species identification can be limited by degradation and treatment, an unsupported historical label cannot substitute for object-specific analysis.

== Forms and regional styles ==
The two principal structural types are the cap crest and the helmet. Cap crests commonly consist of a head or figure rising from a basketry base; their visual mass is elevated above a long gown. Helmets encircle the wearer's head, creating a broader silhouette and allowing faces to be distributed around the entire surface. Women as well as men have been documented wearing some cap forms, including crests of women's associations, whereas the heavier helmets documented in the field were worn by men.

Single human heads range from calm portraits to compressed grimaces. Janus crests set two faces back to back; other helmets carry three or four faces. Multiple heads can be differentiated by complexion, sex, expression or insignia. Some tall crests extend the head into a columnar neck or a small full figure. The Widekum term utaturu has been recorded for a class of skin-covered figures with limbs.

Animal and composite forms include antelopes for hunting associations, crocodilians associated in some communities with dangerous water or witch-finding powers, and rams, monkeys, elephants or creatures combining human and animal features. A subject does not have a single meaning throughout the region. Its identification depended on the owning association, its grade, the name of the masquerade and the relations among characters in a performance.

Art historians have used a three-part geographic model to organise formal variation. It is a heuristic rather than a set of fixed ethnic boundaries:

- Lower Cross River works, associated especially with Efik and eastern Ibibio areas around Calabar, tend towards rounded or “fleshy” naturalism. Full cheeks, smooth transitions and elaborate coiffures create an idealised, well-nourished appearance. Some share features with Ibibio carving farther west.
- Middle Cross River works, particularly those attributed to Ejagham and Akparabong workshops, often emphasise bony ridges at the forehead, cheeks and jaw. Wide foreheads, open mouths, inserted teeth and dark linear designs can intensify what Suzanne Preston Blier called “skeletal realism”.
- Upper Cross River works associated with Banyang, Anyang, eastern Ejagham and some Widekum communities frequently have small heads on very long, thick necks, pronounced throat forms, narrow jaws and stretched mouths. Darker coverings, faceted planes and rougher modelling connect some examples visually with western Cameroon Grassfields sculpture.

Objects do not always fit the model. Boki workshops developed several distinguishable schools; Widekum artists combined Cross River techniques with local facial proportions; and purchased or copied crests moved stylistic features far from the place where they originated. The same association could commission from a distant artist, and a carver could adapt a prestigious imported type to local taste.

== Performance and social institutions ==
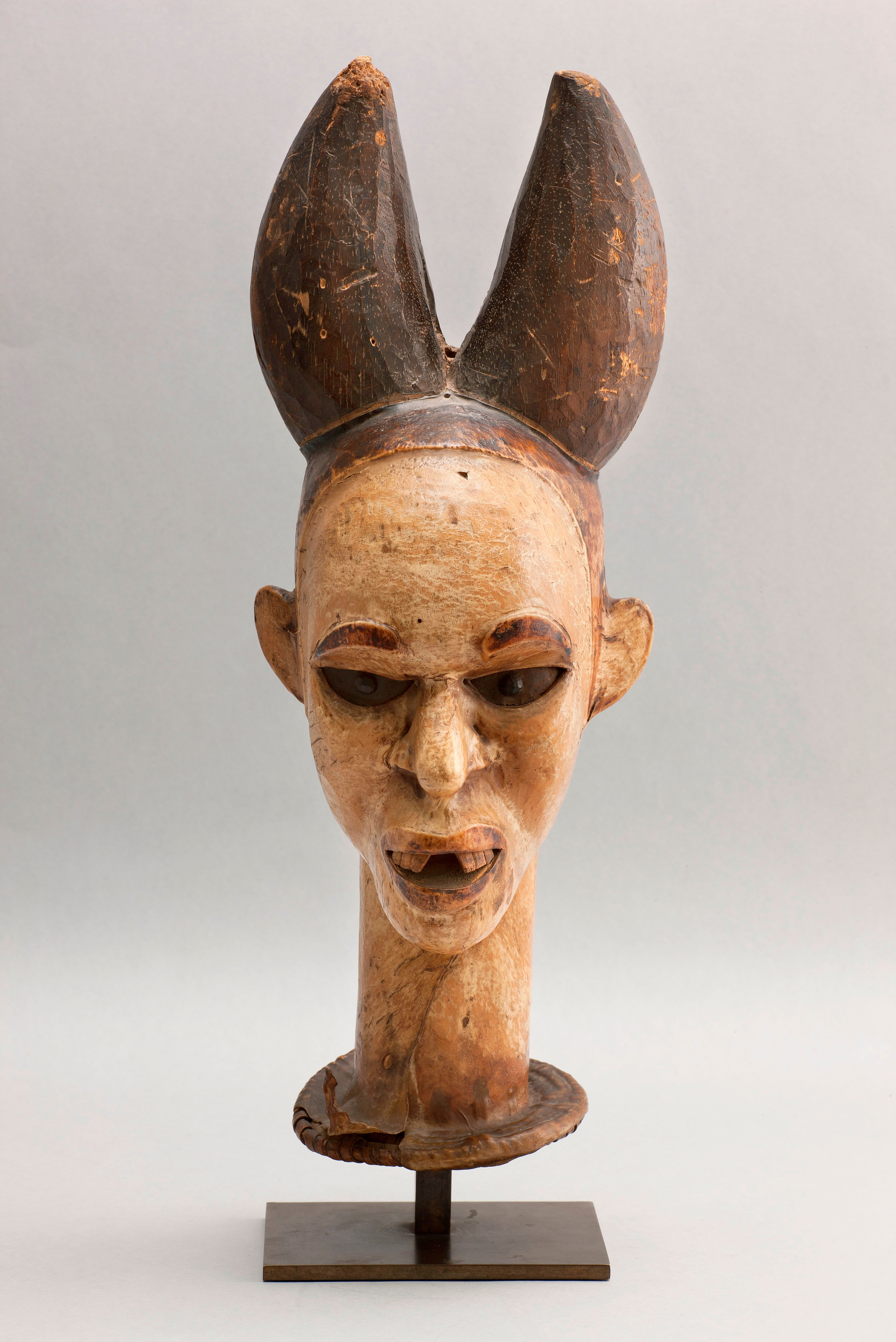
A 20th-century Ejagham crest with an animal-hide face, inserted teeth and a basketry base.

Association houses were centres of artistic patronage and storage. Their painted walls could depict insignia and masquerades; crests and costumes were displayed on platforms or kept wrapped in mats above a hearth, where smoke and warmth reduced moisture and insects. Competition among associations encouraged patrons to obtain conspicuous new forms. An association's name could also become the name by which its masquerade and crest were known.

The most influential patrons included the graded Ekpe and Ngbe leopard associations. Their grades had distinct emblems, costumes and performance privileges, and high-ranking imagery could include opposed or multiple faces. The region also supported warrior associations such as Nkang, hunting groups such as Bekarum or Ekarum, funeral and ancestor organisations, witch-finding associations, age grades, women's groups such as Egbege and numerous entertainment clubs. The labels overlap: an organisation could combine political, religious, judicial, economic and recreational functions rather than correspond to a single modern category.

Performance activated contrasts built into the sculpture. “Beauty” characters usually had smooth human faces, warm or light surfaces and elaborate coiffures. They wore clean, flowing, brightly coloured cloth and moved with controlled, measured choreography. “Beast” or fierce characters used dark surfaces, animal traits, deformity or aggressive expressions; their rough costumes and abrupt movement could clear a path, intimidate spectators or provide a dramatic counterweight to the beautiful character. Paired characters were relational rather than simple representations of good and evil. Fierceness could protect a community, while beauty could embody discipline, prosperity, sexuality or social refinement.

Funerals of titled members were major occasions for bringing out association property. Crests also appeared at initiations, victories, title-taking, seasonal festivals, civic displays and entertainment. Their use changed over time. A form once restricted to warriors could become an age-grade or public “play” masquerade; a funerary crest could be reproduced for sale; and an association transferred to another town could acquire a new repertoire while retaining the prestige of its place of origin.

== Iconography and aesthetics ==
Naturalism in Cross River carving is selective. The hide can suggest pores, flesh and the tension of a living face, yet proportions are manipulated to signal character and visibility in motion. A serene head may have an exceptionally long neck so that it rises above the costume. A fierce face may enlarge the mouth or sharpen the jaw. Inserted teeth and reflective eyes catch light at a distance, while oil gives the skin a freshly renewed sheen.

Coiffures are among the most elaborate features. Curved projections often catalogued as horns can represent arranged hair, including styles associated with the completion of women's premarital seclusion. Pegs, incised fields, attached hair and spiral constructions distinguish sex, beauty and status. Raised circular marks on the temples or forehead and painted lines may reproduce local scarification or cosmetic conventions rather than identify a single ethnic group.

Some light-coloured faces bear nsibidi signs or related graphic patterns. Their meaning was not necessarily available to every viewer: particular signs could refer to association knowledge, rank or moral concepts, while similar linear ornament could also function as beautification. Reading every mark as a fixed word therefore overstates the uniformity of nsibidi and ignores the performative context in which signs were disclosed.

Opposed faces are often gendered through colour and features, with a darker male face and a lighter female face. That convention is documented for particular masks but is not universal. Janus and multi-faced forms have also been interpreted as signs of high grade, expanded vigilance, the capacity to see in more than one direction, or the conjunction of complementary powers. The relevant interpretation depends on the association and cannot be derived from the number of faces alone.

The significance of skin itself has generated several interpretations. Trophy-head theories link the material to warfare and captured power. Other scholarship emphasises the transformation of a carved object into a compelling spirit image: a covering that attracts, contains or makes present a non-human force. Robert Farris Thompson related this logic to Cross River-derived practices preserved in Cuban Abakuá institutions, where skin-covered ritual objects and Efik- or Ejagham-derived vocabulary form part of a wider Atlantic history. These explanations are interpretive and need not describe every association that used a skin-covered crest.

== Historical development and circulation ==
The date at which the technique began is unknown. Its wide distribution and the lack of securely dated early objects make a single point of origin difficult to establish. Ejagham communities are often credited with an important role, but the surviving record shows sustained exchange among many populations rather than a one-way diffusion from an isolated centre.

John Beecroft collected two skin-covered headdresses at Old Calabar in 1843, among the earliest documented examples to enter a European collection. Leo Frobenius illustrated “Calabar” masks in 1898. Alfred Mansfeld, Charles Partridge and P. A. Talbot collected and wrote about works during the first decade of the 20th century, dispersing them to museums in Berlin, London, Oxford and elsewhere. Their records are valuable but reflect colonial categories, uneven access to restricted institutions and an emphasis on unusual objects.

Regional commerce helped art forms travel. From the 17th century onward, Efik and Aro merchants connected the coast with inland markets. Rights in associations such as Ekpe and Ngbe could be purchased by communities seeking access to trade, law and prestige. The transfer included names, grades, performances and material insignia. At first a receiving group might buy a crest from the sponsoring community; later it could commission a local copy. The result was a network in which institutional property and artistic style circulated together.

The 19th-century palm-oil economy produced new patrons along the river routes. Wealth was invested in buildings, imported goods, processions and locally made prestige arts. Keith Nicklin associated this period with a florescence of skin-covered masks, as workshops competed to supply increasingly serene, elaborate or grotesque forms. The observation does not mean that commerce created the tradition, but it helps explain the scale and variety of works surviving from the late 19th and early 20th centuries.

Circulation continued under colonial rule. The Ikem masquerade spread from Old Calabar into Ibibio and Annang areas in the early 20th century. Annang carvers were producing accomplished skin-covered heads by the 1930s, and variants travelled into the Umuahia and Item areas among Igbo communities. A 1977 photograph by Keith Nicklin records the Igbo artist Obunyan Okpori of Amaokwe Item with an unfinished crest intended for an Oiyima masquerade, demonstrating that adoption involved active local production rather than the passive copying of museum types.

== Artists and workshops ==
Although colonial catalogues usually reduced authorship to an ethnic label, field research recovered the names of several carvers. In the lower Cross River area, Nicklin compared a large, rounded Calabar cap crest with the work of the Efik artist Etim Bassey Ekpenyong of Old Town and the Efut artist Asikpo Edet Okon of Ibonda near Creek Town. Such comparisons identify workshop relationships rather than secure signatures, because artists shared conventions and objects travelled after completion.

A four-faced Akparabong helmet made around 1900–1915 has been tentatively attributed to Takim Eyuk, who was said to have died about 1915. Related works were connected to an Akparabong school extending from neighbouring Boki practice. Elders named Ndoma Okok, also known as Ndoma Asuquo, as the school's last major artist; he died in 1932. Kenneth Murray documented Boki schools in the 1940s and 1950s, and Nicklin recorded further artists and workshop differences in the 1970s.

Named authorship does not displace collective ownership. A carver supplied the sculpted and covered crest, but association officers determined its commission, restricted knowledge, costume, music, choreography and appearances. Repairs and renewal might be carried out by later specialists. The object therefore accumulated authorship across a social and material history.

== Collecting, attribution and provenance ==
The removal of a crest from its costume often erased the information most useful for identification. Collectors might record the port of purchase rather than the village of use, the language of an intermediary rather than the owner's identity, or a broad ethnonym rather than an association name. A crest acquired in Calabar could have been carved inland; one collected among Igbo users could have been bought in the middle Cross River; and a “Boki” form could belong to a workshop spanning a local boundary.

Early photographs, field notes and association histories can partially reconstruct these biographies. Wear, repairs, holes for ornaments and residues of oil may indicate performance, while an unusually pristine object may have been made for trade. Nicklin suggested that some masks in British collections were commissioned by traders and never danced. The distinction is not always absolute: an object could be made for an association, used briefly, sold, repaired for export, or replaced by another crest.

Museum attributions have consequently shifted from confident tribal labels towards qualified formulations such as “Ejagham or Bale artist”, “Cross River region” or “possibly Efik”. This practice recognises uncertainty but can also flatten local histories. Provenance research benefits from retaining every documented layer—artist, workshop, association, user community, collecting place, collector and subsequent owner—rather than selecting one as the object's sole identity.

== Conservation and technical research ==
Skin-covered crests combine materials that respond differently to humidity and stress. Wood expands and contracts across the grain; rawhide is strong under tension but can split when dry or distorted; basketry and fibre attract insects; oil and resin collect dirt or become brittle. In the Cross River's humid environment, fungi, termites, other insects and rodents posed additional risks. Communities stored crests above hearths, wrapped them, oiled them and replaced vulnerable parts.

Museum conservation introduced a different climate and different expectations of permanence. Treatments that flatten a repair or remove a dark coating can erase evidence of use. Radiography and ultraviolet imaging at the Metropolitan Museum of Art have revealed patches fixed with smaller nails than the original covering, metal rods concealed within broken coils and differences between an original plant-resin coating and a later toned patch. Some repairs appear to have been made during a crest's active life by people familiar with the original technique; others may be later museum or market interventions.

The 2014 National Museum of African Art project established a comparative technical baseline for nineteen objects. Besides species and wood questions, it documented joins, hidden fasteners, pigments and coatings. Its finding of greater material diversity than the standard field account cautions against treating the well-documented duiker-hide method as an invariable recipe. Technical evidence is most informative when combined with performance histories and provenance rather than used to assign ethnicity by material alone.

== Continuity and transformation ==
Skin-covered masquerades did not end when early examples entered museums. Pitt Rivers Museum research in 2013 recorded continued use in Cross River communities for funerals, initiations, festivals, cultural displays and entertainment, while also noting that its own collection contained no example made after 1942. That gap illustrates how historical museum holdings can make a living but changing practice appear extinct.

Not every contemporary Cross River masquerade uses an animal-hide crest, and older forms may be remade in painted wood, synthetic materials or new combinations. Urban Calabar performance has become more public, spatially organised and economically embedded. Jordan Fenton describes masquerade there as a fluid field shaped by payments, sponsorship, tourism, heritage politics and the changing use of streets. Skin-covered crests form one historically important strand within that larger performance economy rather than a frozen survival from a precolonial past.

Contemporary change also alters questions of access and interpretation. Association knowledge may remain restricted even when a performance is public; museum databases may reproduce obsolete names; and the circulation of digital images can detach a crest once more from its owners and choreography. Research that joins artists' and associations' accounts with archives and conservation science is therefore essential to understanding both historical objects and present practice.

== See also ==
- Traditional African masks
- Ekpe
- Ejagham people
- Nsibidi
- Ikom monoliths
- Abakuá
