= Jagham language =

Ekoid language of Nigeria and Cameroon

Ekoi
- Ejagham
- Native to: Nigeria, Cameroon
- Ethnicity: Ekoi people
- Native speakers: (120,000 cited 2000)
- Language family: Niger–Congo?: Atlantic–Congo; Volta-Congo; Benue–Congo; Bantoid; Southern Bantoid; Ekoid–Mbe; Ekoid; Ekoi
- Dialects: Akin; Bendeghe; Northern Etung; Southern Etung; Ekwe; Akamkpa-Ejagham; Keaka; Obang; Nkim; Nkum; Ekajuk
- Writing system: Latin script

Language codes
- ISO 639-3: etu
- Glottolog: ejag1239
- Ejagham

The Jagham language, Ejagham, also known as Ekoi, is an Ekoid language of Nigeria and Cameroon spoken by the Ekoi people. The E- in Ejagham represents the class prefix for "language", analogous to the Bantu ki- in KiSwahili

The Ekoi are one of several peoples who use Nsibidi ideographs, and may be the ones that created them.

== Dialects ==
Ekoi is dialectally diverse. The dialects of Ejagham are divided into Western and Eastern groups:

- Western varieties include Bendeghe, Northern and Southern Etung, Ekwe and Akamkpa-Ejagham;
- Eastern varieties include Keaka and Obang.

Blench (2019) also lists Ekin as an Ejagham dialect.

== Phonology ==
=== Consonants ===
		Labial	Alveolar	Post-alv./ Palatal	Velar	Labio- velar
Nasal		m	n	ɲ	ŋ	
Plosive/ Affricate	voiceless	p	t	t͡ʃ	k	k͡p
Plosive/ Affricate	voiced	b	d	d͡ʒ	ɡ	ɡ͡b
Fricative	voiceless	f	s			
Fricative	voiced	(β)			(ɣ)	
Tap			ɾ			
Approximant				j		w

- Stop sounds /b, ɡ/ are lenited to fricatives [β, ɣ] when in intervocalic positions.
- Velar sounds [k, ɡ; (ɣ)] can be heard as uvular [q, (ʁ)] when in syllable-final position.

=== Vowels ===
	Front	Central	Back
Close	i	ʉ (Note: Occurs as unrounded /ɨ/ in the eastern Ejagham dialect. Does not occur in the southern dialect.)	u
Close-mid	e (Note: Only occurs in the southern Ejagham dialect.)	ə	o
Open-mid	ɛ	ə	ɔ
Open		a	

== Writing system ==
A Jagham alphabet was developed by John R. Watters and Kathie Watters in 1981.

Western Jagham alphabet
a	b	bh	ch	d	e	ǝ	f	g	gb	gh	i	j	k	kp	m	n	ny	ŋ	o	p	r	s	t	u	ʉ	w	y

== Morphology ==
Ekoi has the following noun classes, listed here with their Bantu equivalents. Watters (1981) says there are fewer than in Bantu because of mergers (class 4 into 3, 7 into 6, etc.), though Blench notes that there is no reason to think that the common ancestral language had as many noun classes as proto-Bantu.

Noun class	Prefix	Concord
1	N-	w, ɲ
2	a-	b
3	N-	m
5	ɛ-	j
6	a-	m
8	bi-	b
9	N-	j, ɲ
14	ɔ-	b
19	i-	f

('N' stands for a homorganic nasal. 'j' is "y".)
