= Ekoi =

"Ekoi" or "Ejagham" may refer to:

- Ekoi people, a group of people found in south-eastern Nigeria, also known as Ejagham
- Ekoid languages, the language spoken by the Ekoi people of south-eastern Nigeria
- Ekoi religion
- Lake Ejagham, a small lake in western Cameroon
