= Ndoe language =

Ekoid language spoken in Nigeria

Ndoe
- Ekparabong = (Nkpanjen, Nkanacha, Ntriokim, Okpogante, Abanko Olokpo, Opu and Balep) Nigeria
- Region: Cross River State
- Native speakers: (7,300 cited 2000)
- Language family: Niger–Congo?: Atlantic–Congo; Benue–Congo; Southern Bantoid; Ekoid–Mbe; Ekoid; Ndoe
- Dialects: Ekparabong (Akparabong)

Language codes
- ISO 639-3: nbb
- Glottolog: ndoe1238
- Ndoe

Ndoe, or Ekparabong is the most divergent of the Ekoid languages of Nigeria and Cameroon.
