= Ekoi people =

Ethnic group in Nigeria and Cameroon

Ekoi/Ejagham
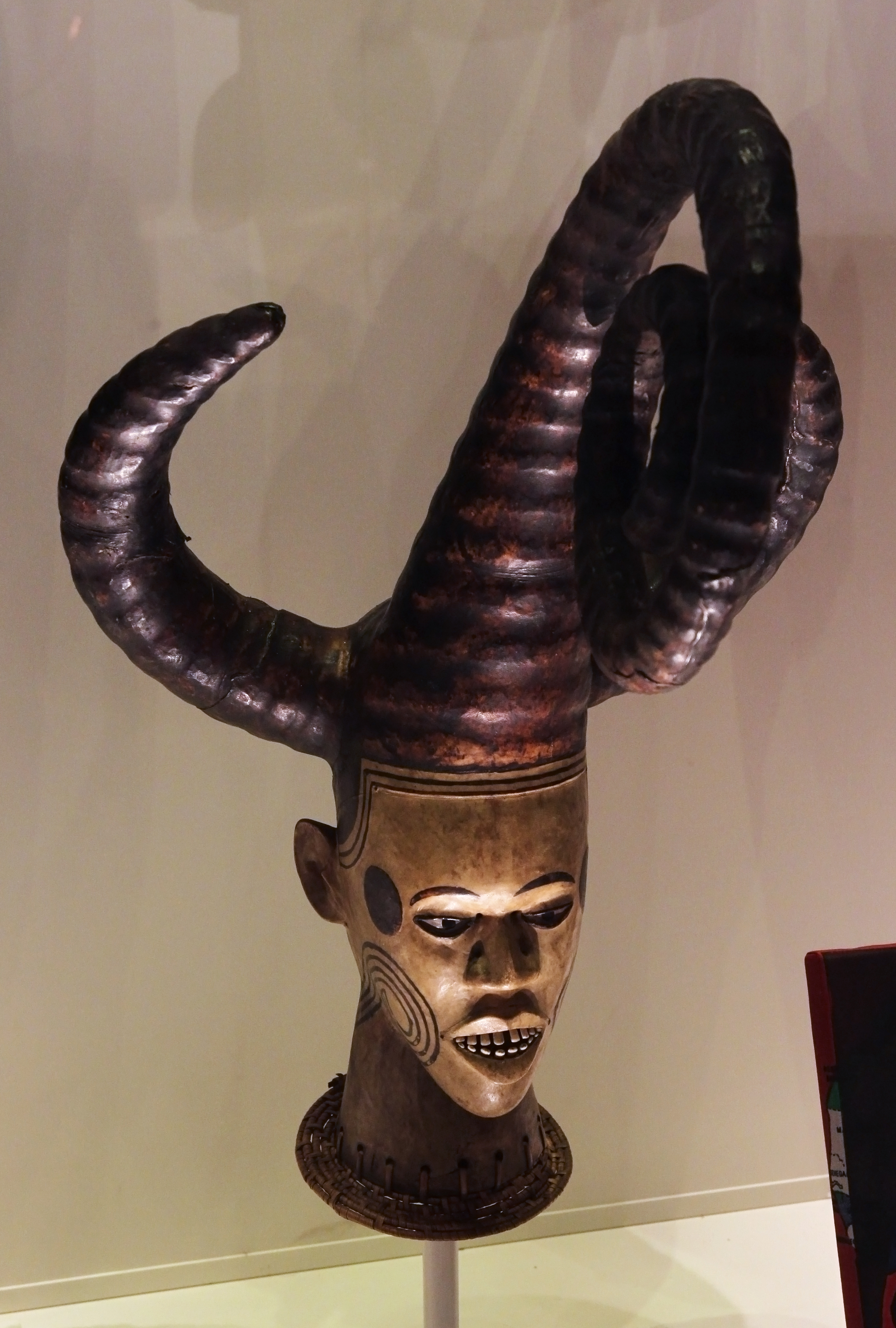
- Ekoi skin-covered Ekpe headdress and mask

Languages
- Ejagham , English language,

Religion
- Ejagham religion, Christianity

Related ethnic groups
- Ibibio, Bakor, Annang, Efik, Oron, Bahumono and Mbube

Ekoi people, also known as Ejagham, are an ethnic group in south east Nigeria and extending eastward into the southwest region of Cameroon. They speak the Ejagham language. The Ejagham languages or sub dialects are spoken in Akamkpa, Etung, Ikom( Bakor),Odukpani and Calabar municipality ( the Qua Ejagham) some groups in Ikom (such as Akparabong and Nde), are also considered Ejagham and some groups in Ogoja (Ishibori and Bansarra), Ufia, and Yakö. The Ejagham/Ekoi have lived closely with the nearby Biase, Efik, Annang, and Ibibio people of south south Nigeria. The Ekoi are best known for their Ekpe headdresses and the Nsibidi ideograms. The Ejagham are widely believed to be the creators of the Nsibidi ideograms and still use them as a part of their tradition.

The Ejagham span from South Eastern Nigeria to the south Western part of Cameroon.The Ejaghams in Cross River state stretch from the Qua in Calabar municipality to Odukpani and Bakassi in the South to Akamkpa,Etung and Ikom in the central cross River.some communities in Ogoja also identify as Ejagham.The Ejaghams are by far the most diverse ethnic group in Cross River State.In Cameroons South West region,the Ejaghams are mainly found in the Eyumojock subdivision of Manyu division ,south West region.

== Language ==
The Ekoi language is one of the Ekoid languages, a Bantoid language in the Niger–Congo dialect cluster. The Ekoi are the likely creators of the Nsibidi script, a script which can be seen in many surviving artifacts found in the areas inhabited by the Ekoi/Ejagham people, and which roughly translates into "cruel letters". It is an entirely African script, with virtually no Western influence. According to Ekoi folklore, the script was taught to them by mermaids.

Nsibidi ideograms convey countless concepts. There are over 12 different symbols for love, 7 different symbols for hatred, 7 different symbols for speech, 8 different symbols for mirror, 14 different symbols for a set table, and 6 different symbols for journeys. Symbols that are shaded in usually mean danger or bad fortune, and include ideas of a dead body or the death of a friend. The nsibidi script is used in the Ekoi languages and is understandable in reading and writing. The script's importance is emphasized through its beauty and artistic aesthetics rather than its ability to shape cohesive sentences.

== History ==
The predominant paternal haplogroup among the Ejagham is E1b1a1-M2. The ancestors of the Ejagham originally came from Northeast Africa and moved around the Green Sahara. The gradual movement of the Proto Ejagham to the Lake Ejagham area may have been associated with the expansion of Sahel agriculture in the African Neolithic period, following the desiccation of the Sahara in c. 3500 BCE.

Ntufam Ndifon Attah explains that "Ejagham" is derived from the combination of three words: ekub (a whole or parcel), ejag (split or broken), haam (going on infinitely or without end). Put together then, Ejagham stands for that unified whole or parcel that was originally one but is now broken into pieces and is forging for reunification. This refers to the first break away of the other tribes (in Nigeria, Cameroon, Uganda, South Africa etc.) that migrated from the historical Bantu. It further refers to the reunification of the Ejagham speaking communities in Ikom LGA, Etung LGA, Quas of the present Calabar and it environs, Ishibor in Ogoja and Southern Cameroons among others. The Ejagham are one of the oldest Bantu groups and were an integral part of the Bantu expansion.

By 200 AD, the Ejagham civilization had developed to such an advanced level that gave inspiration to the creation of ingenious forms as exemplified by the Ikom monoliths and Nsibidi script. There was a large and centralized Ejagham kingdom with a capacity for mobilizing its citizenry for its various needs. A strong economy supported by a secure agro-technological base was established. Fishing was practiced by those at the coastal areas and hunting by those residing in the hinterland. Domestication of animals like sheep, goats, and fowls was common while the knowledge of iron workings provided the tools through which most of these activities were carried out.

Before Igbo arrival to the Arochukwu region, a group of proto Ibibio migrated to the area and established the Ibom Kingdom. This proto Ibibio group originally came from Usak Edet (Isanguele), a segment of the Ejagham in present-day Southern Cameroon. Eventually, groups of Igbo settlers moved into the area. Tensions between the Igbo settlers and the majority of the indigenous Ibibio led to the Aro-Ibibio Wars. The Efik were originally from the Ibom Kingdom and might have left before or during the Aro-Ibibio Wars. The Igbo settlers invited Ejagham (Akpa) mercenaries led by Osim and Akuma Nnubi. The allied Igbo settlers, Ibibio rebels, and Akpa mercenaries won the war. The Arochukwu kingdom was founded by Akuma Nnubi.

=== Atlantic slave trade ===
The Atlantic slave trade was at its peak in the 18th and 19th centuries after previous encounters with the Portuguese. Old Calabar, a city state in southeastern Nigeria, was a major center for the Slave Trade as well as trading palm oil. During this time the indigenous culture was completely destroyed and manhunts along with human sacrifice were at an all time high.

Ekoi people taken into slavery across the Atlantic were notable in Cuba, where their art, seen in the forms of drums and headdresses, survives to this day.

=== Colonialism ===
The Ekoi people, while all speaking the same language, have not tended to live in complete unison. Living in what is now Southeast Nigeria and Southwest Cameroon, the people were physically divided by British and German colonial holdings in Africa. When a German captain named Von Weiss was killed, the European power took measures to combat the native Ekoi people (1899–1904 German-Ekoi War). However, the response was not uniform; not only were there no pitched battles, but some villages fled instead of fighting back. Moreover, Ekoi people in British-controlled Nigeria did not act to help their ethnic compatriots.

== Ekoi Society ==
The Ejagham, an East Nigerian ethnic group, was the first to make skin covered masks and dance in them. The Nigerian and Cameroon regions share similar tribal organizations and traditional masks. Nkwa-mbuk, a mask-wearing society of the Ekoi, performed rituals such as human sacrifices and head hunting. Once a battle was won, the skin of the enemies were taken and made into a mask to proclaim victory. The head and heart are the most significant parts of the body. The head is the home of the spirit, therefore, to come back with the head of an outsider showed you were a strong man. Men were expected to engage in combat in order to be accepted in a male power society and have the opportunity to get married.

The Ekoi believe that the heirs of the first settlers of their present settlement own the land. Though newcomers are not allowed to buy land, they are able to purchase rights of settlement. Ekoi men have traditionally hunted, while women have engaged in fishing, agriculture, raising yams, plantains, and corn (maize). Both men and women participate in weaving.

The people of Ejagham treat the earth with the utmost respect. The land provides the crops that grow in the fields, water to drink and bath in from the river, and animals to hunt in the forest. The man who chooses the place of settlement becomes the chief of the village. The current chief of the village along with all the previous chiefs before him are honored until the end of time. Each time the village is met with a blessing the people present offerings to the ancestors.

=== Mgbe and Nnimm ===
The Mgbe and Nnimm societies were for males and females, respectively, in the Ekoi community. The Ekpe(Leopard) Society believed in the story of an old king named Tanze. When he died, he became a fish that was caught by a woman. A man killed the woman, created the Leopard Society, and Tanze became the body of a female drum. This tale raised the symbols of the roaring fish and the leopard as signs from God and so they would be referred to in every Ekoi court.

Initiates of Nnimm would be unmarried young girls. They would wear cursive body-painting and material dresses of calabash and shells, as well as leather necklaces. Bones of monkeys were matched with feather headdresses (the single feather at the back of the head was most important, as it was the Nnimm feather) and finished off with a cowrie-fringed wrapper. Nnimm plumes would become very important to Africans in Cuba.

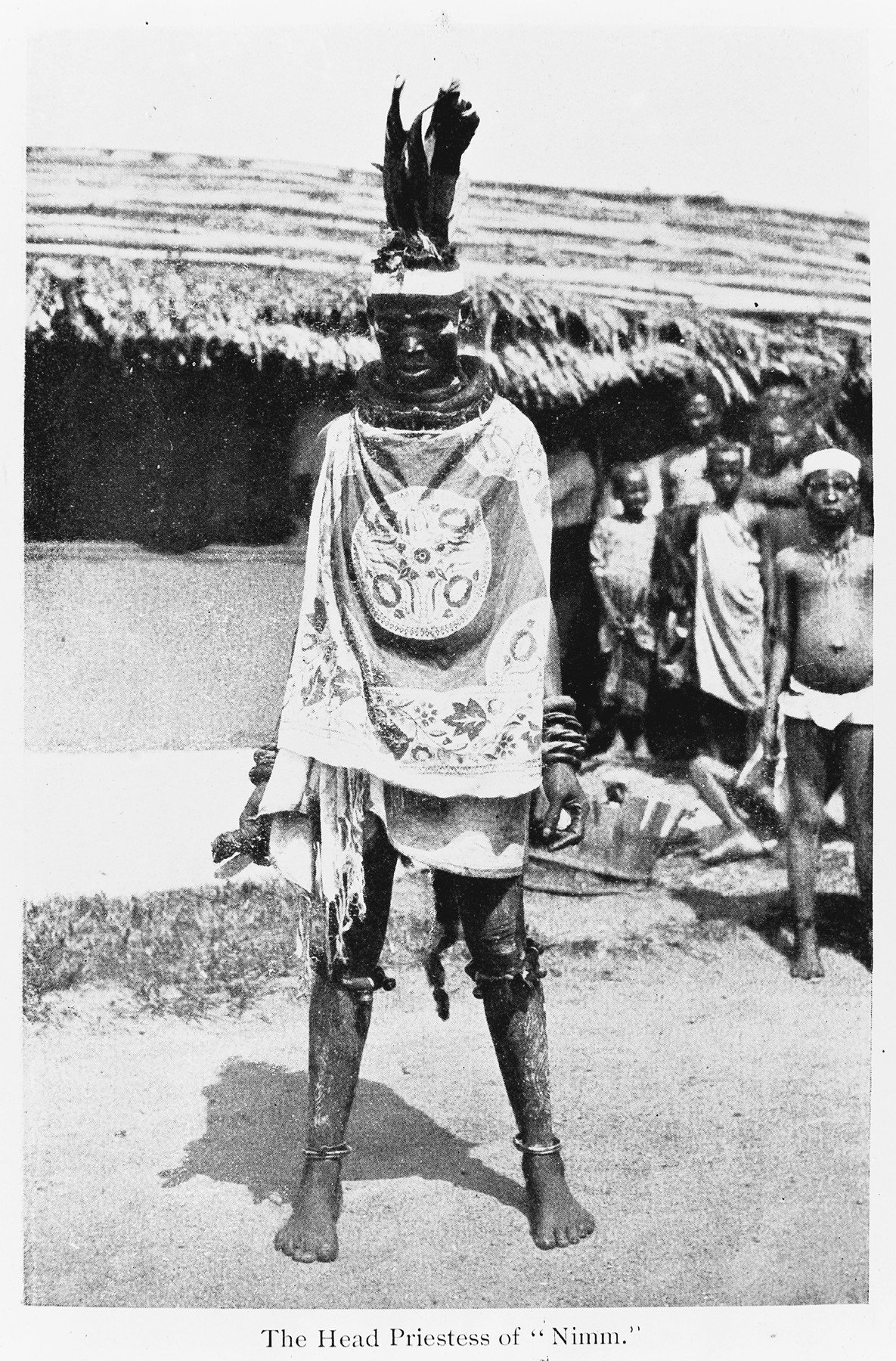
Head priest of Nimms

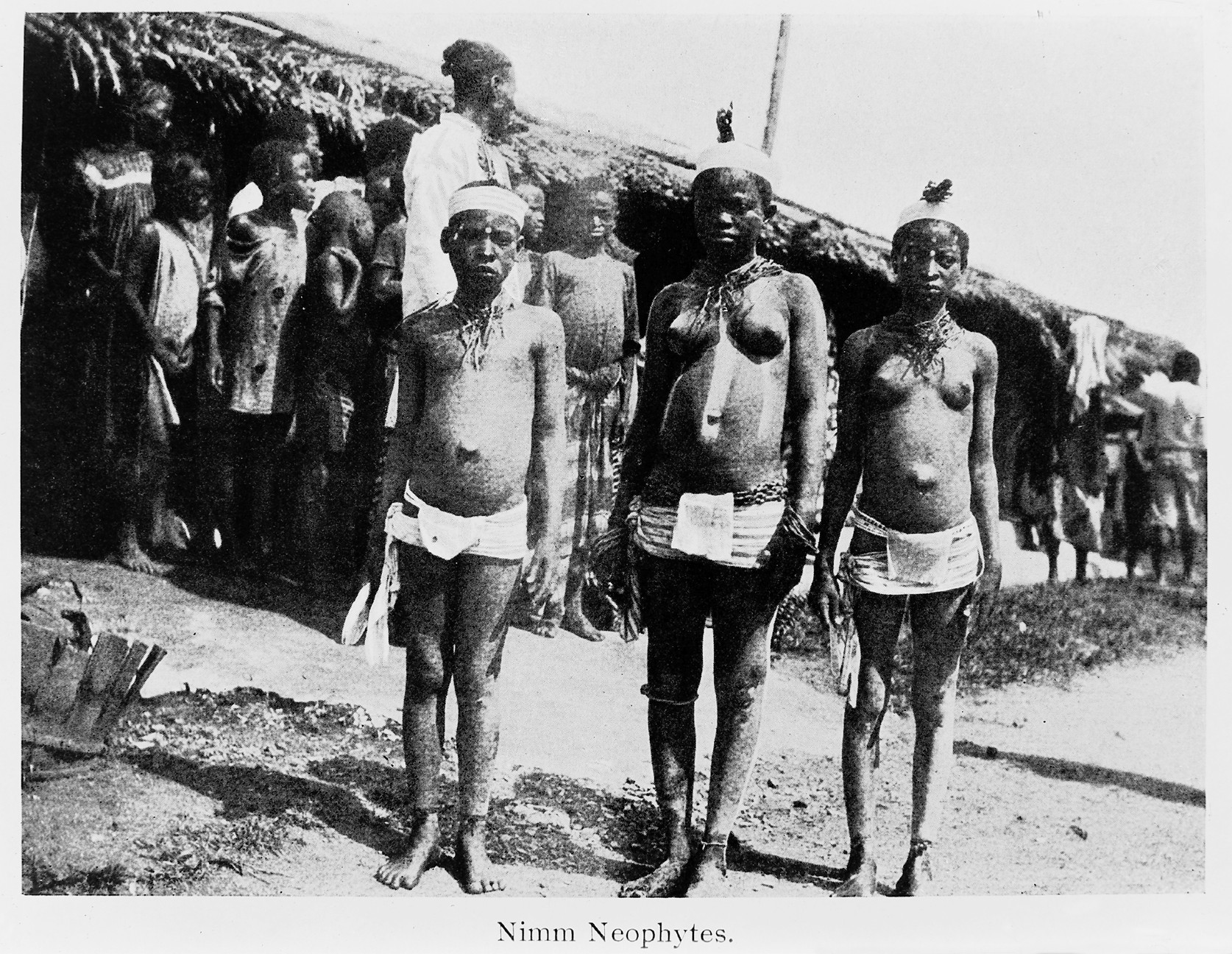
Nimm neophytes

=== Arts ===
The Ekoi culture is known for mastering the art of sculpture. The complexity of its art is a hint to the complexity of the Ekoi people's organization. Their masks are unique because unlike most traditional African masks, the Ekoi masks are fairly realistic. In the Ekoi's approach to make 2-sided masks, the darker side represented the male force, and the whiter side the female force. The wooden masks were often covered with strips of animal skin or human skin. The realism aspect is further pushed with shiny eyes and sometimes including human hair. The teeth can be carved with wood like the rest of the sculpture or different materials like wood or cane are used.

Body-painting and poetry are also critical to men, as they are seen simultaneously as warriors and artists. Though war has been largely uncommon in Ekoi history, except for the German-Ekoi War between 1899–1904.

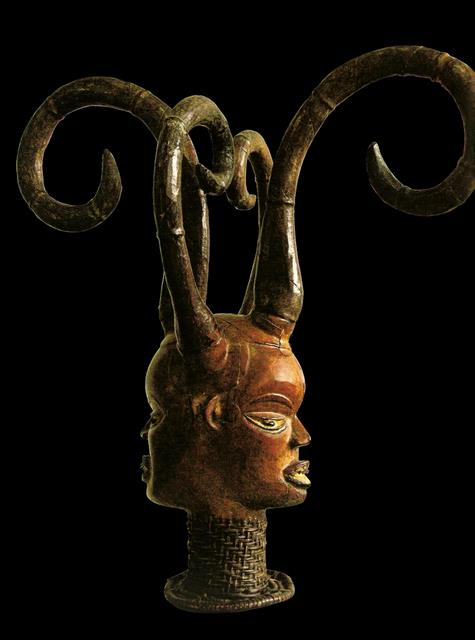
Long-corned statue, Coleção Museu Afro Brasil (São Paulo)

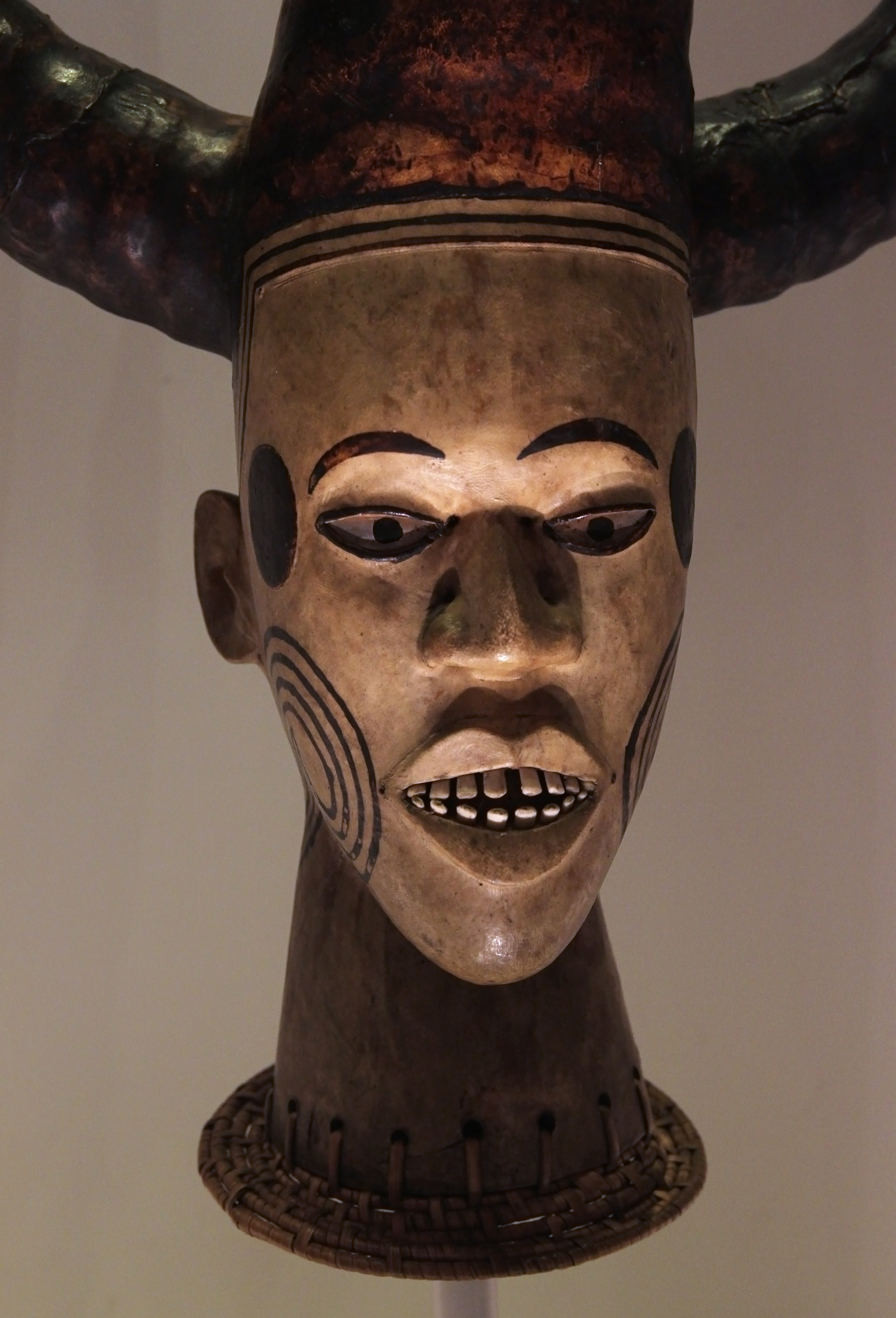
Ekoi mask, British Museum.

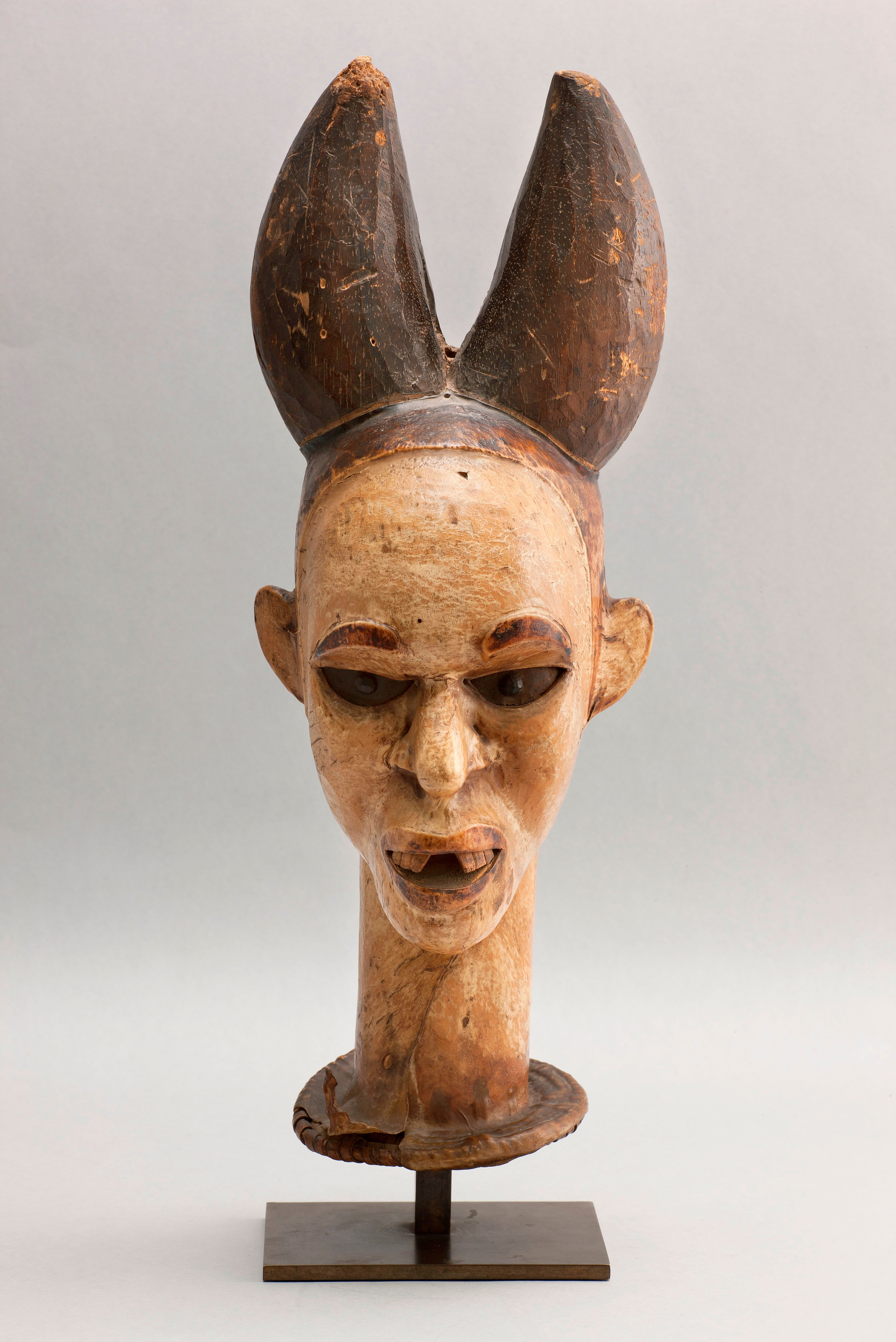
Ngbe statue

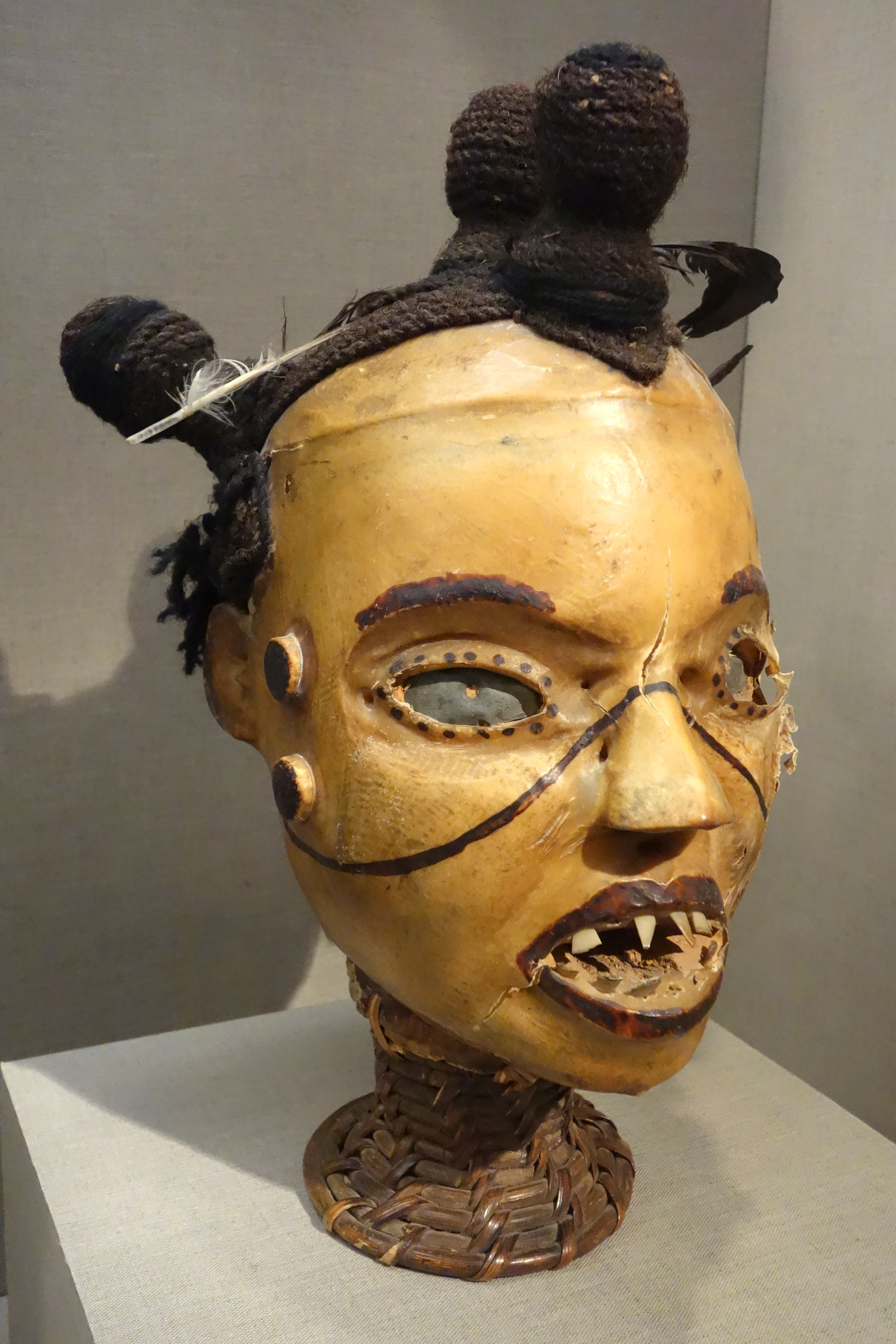
Ekoi Headdress, De young Museum.

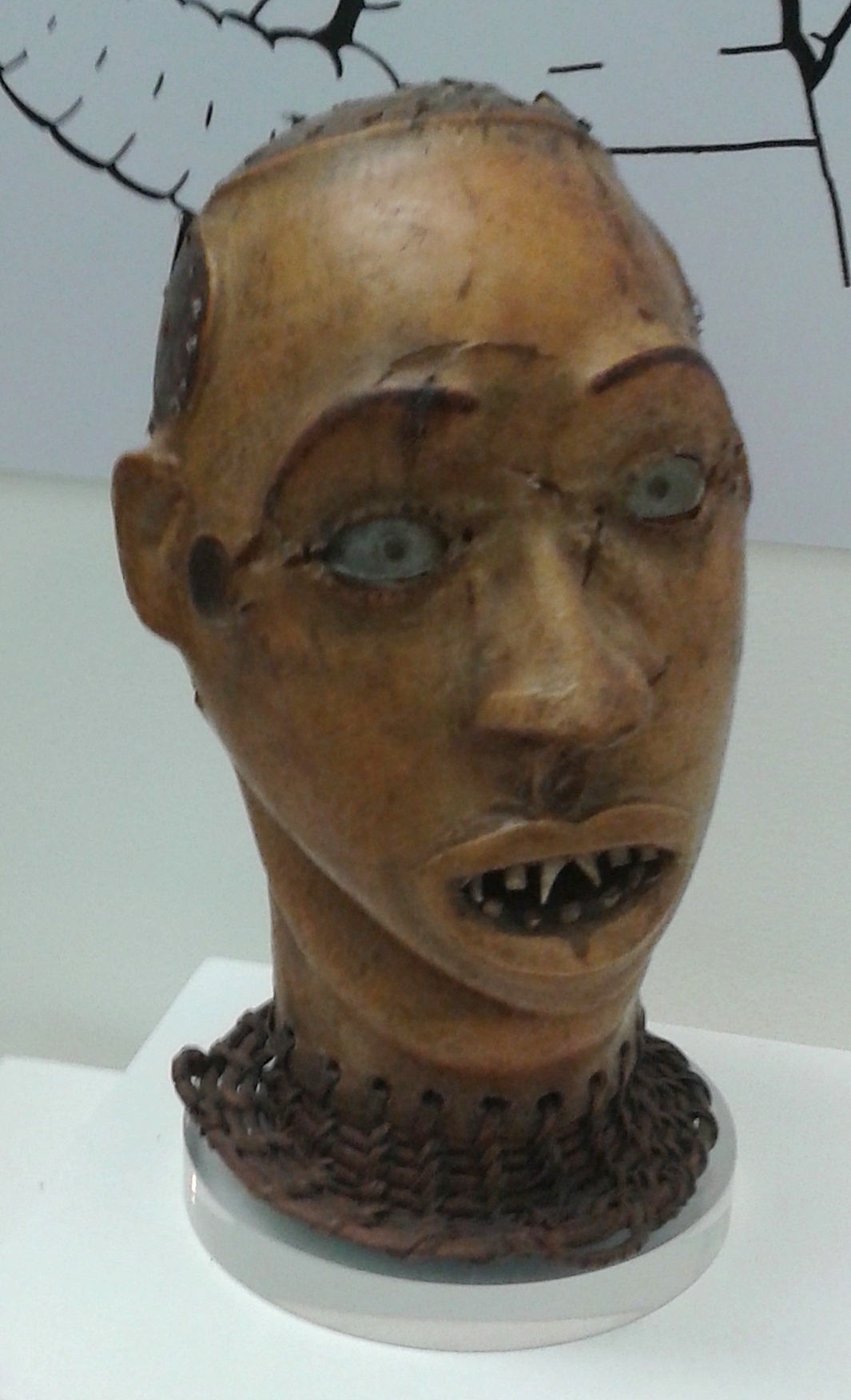
Ngbe statue

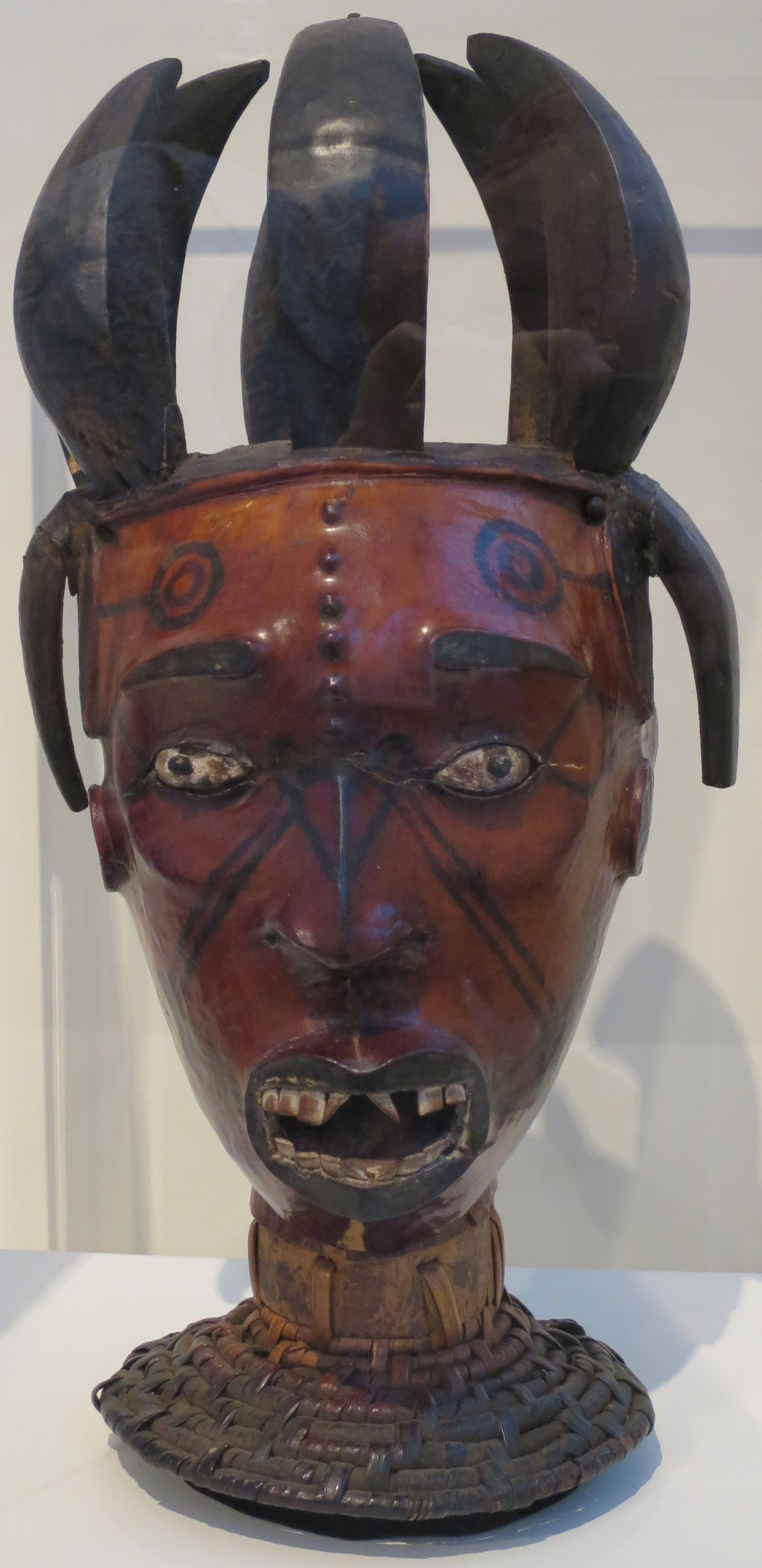
Ekoi Headdress, Honolulu Museum of Art.

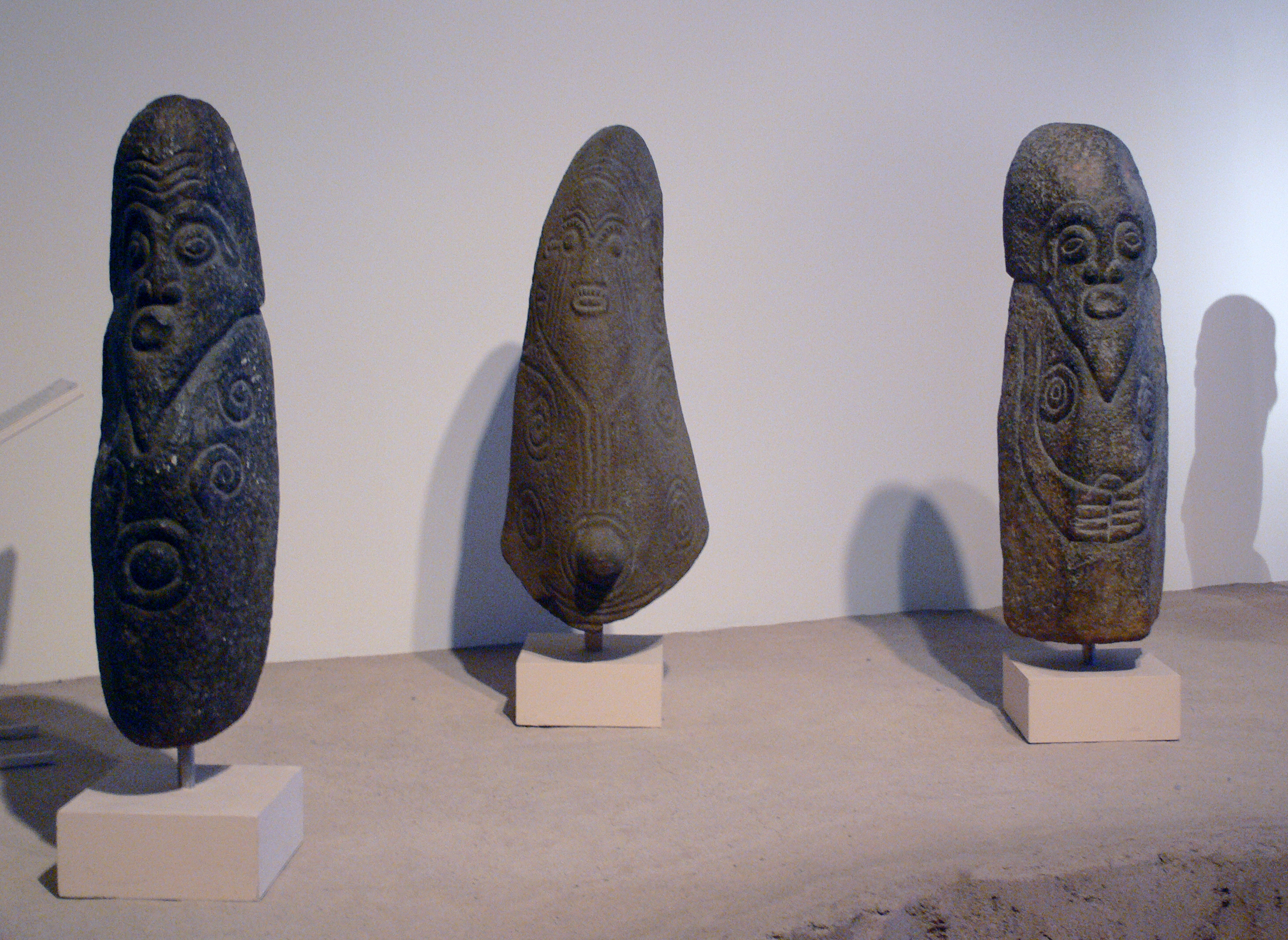
Ekoi sculptures, Linden-Museum Stuttgart

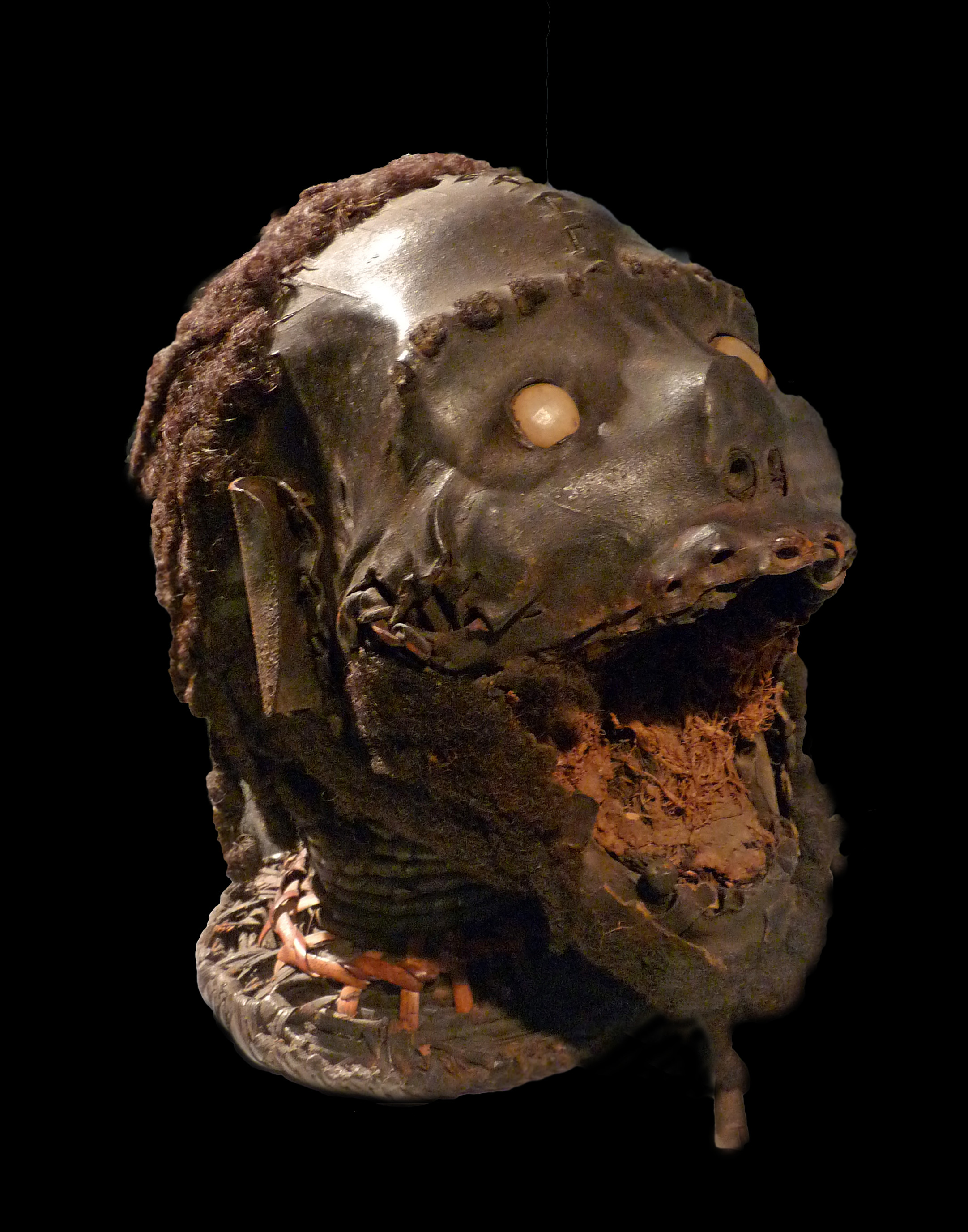
Ejagham, skin covered mask with shiny eyes

=== Mythology ===
The Ekoi have a large number of spoken stories. One creation tale tells of God creating the first man and woman and allowing them to live in a hut. God tells the man to impregnate the woman and leaves before the child is born. When the child is born, God instructs the man and woman to care for their new child. At the end of the tale it is revealed that all people are descendants of this man and woman.

Another tale that explains the natural world tells of Eagle and Ox playing hide-and-seek. Eagle finds Ox immediately and then hides on Ox's horns where Ox cannot see him. Ox goes to every animal and asks if they had seen Eagle, but Eagle tells them all not to say anything. Finally, Fowl tells Ox that Eagle is on his horns. Enraged, Eagle seizes Fowl and swears that he will take his children for this offense. It is said that because of this, eagles eat younger fowls.

=== Folklore ===
The Ekoi believe in the deities named Obassi Nsi and Obassi Osaw. Though both powerful, Obassi Nsi is seen as the loving and caring deity who ripens the food that the Ekoi people plant in the ground. Once you die, your body will be buried in the ground along with your important belonging from earth. The soul then leaves the body and takes on this new form as you live on under the earth with Obassi Nsi. Now, Obassi Osaw is seen as cruel and dangerous as he terrifies the people of Ekoi and is responsible for leading them to death. He does not accept offerings, though the people will still attempt to do so by throwing objects in the air only for them to come back down. In order to protect the people from the fallen objects, Obassi Nsi will draw them down into the earth which shows that Obassi Nsi is more powerful than Obassi Osaw. These deities are friends, they split offerings and eat together. The Ekoi community refers to Obassi Nsi as their mother due to her kind spirit (Ma Obassi as known as Lady Obassi), while Obassi Osaw (Nta Obassi as known as Lord Obassi) is their father.$

=== Leopards ===
Leopards especially would be seen as important in Ekoi society. In times of ntuis (chiefs), the appointed ntui would leave his house and make a series of sacrifices. This included those of skull-caps with leopard's teeth, a staff bound with leopard's skin, and a necklace of leopard's teeth. Also, when a ntui died, his people would enter the jungle to bring back the ngbe as the ntui's spirit returns to God. If they were not wary, it is believed a real leopard would attack them.

== Bibliography ==
- Schaedler, Karl-Ferdinand (1984). Ekoi. Munchen: Panterra Verlag. ASIN B0007B16FU.

== See also ==
- Ekoid languages
- Cross River skin-covered masks
