= KanBuja =

Nigerian musician

- Born: Lakem Daniel Bankong; Ikom, Cross River, Nigeria
- Genres: Afropop; Afrobeat; hip hop
- Occupation: Musician
- Instrument: Piano
- Years active: 2006–present
- Label: Strive Records
- Website: striverecords.com

Lakem Daniel Bankong (born 14 December) known professionally by his stage name KanBuja, is a Nigerian musician, fitness coach and record producer. He is the founder of Strive Records and Iprovefit.

== Early life ==
Kanbuja was born in Nigeria and hails from Dadi village near Ikom, Cross River. He was raised by his grandmother, who served as his maternal figure after his biological mother had him at a young age. Following the passing of his grandmother, Kanbuja moved to Kano, where he lived in the Yankaba and Badawa areas. In 1999, shortly before his 11th birthday, he was adopted by British parents and relocated to the United Kingdom, beginning a new chapter in his life.

== Career ==
He was nominated for the RSE Awards. In February 2021, he released a single titled Chikala, which made its first chart debut in 2022. In March 2025, he followed up with a self-titled single, Kanbuja. In an interview with Lambo Magazine, he revealed that he was embracing Afrobeats while staying true to his Hip Hop roots. Kanbuja also marked his radio rotational debut.
