= Cross River Broadcasting Corporation =

Public broadcaster

Cross River Broadcasting Corporation (CRBC) is a state-owned radio and television broadcaster in Cross River State, Nigeria. The corporation was established in 1978 under Cross River State legislation, with its broadcasting services intended to inform, educate, and entertain the public. Its television service broadcasts on UHF Channel 27, while its radio service broadcasts on 105.5 MHz.

CRBC Ikom is the corporation's broadcasting station serving Northern Cross River State. It began radio broadcasting in August 2003 and television broadcasting in January 2004. The Ikom station broadcasts television on UHF Channel 54 and radio on 87.9 MHz.

== History ==
In 2017, the contract staff of the Television station staged a protest over non-payment of their three months' salary. They reportedly locked the station's gates and held the general manager (GM), Mrs. Theresa Essien, other staff members, and members of the public inside the premises.

In a 2018 research work by God'swill Bassey, the station's breakfast show, "Good Morning Cross River," hosted and produced by Presenter Beatrice Akpala, was described as informative, educative, and entertaining.

In 2020, the Cross River State government announced that the station would be upgraded and renamed "CRBC Plus," offering 24-hour broadcast
