= Human skin mask =

A human skin mask is a mask made of human skin, and may refer to:

- The skin masks made by Ed Gein
- Dead Skin Mask, a song in the album Seasons in the Abyss by the thrash metal band Slayer, about Ed Gein
- The masks worn by Leatherface in the film The Texas Chainsaw Massacre
- Human skin masks often referenced in Wuxia fiction

Other appearances of the concept include:

- The synthetic mask used by Jeffrey Hatrix
- An Ekoi mask featured in the section Human Skin Mask of the second episode of the third season of Ripley's Believe It or Not!
- A set of masks that Marilyn Manson was accused of buying
- A mask that appeared on a short-lived promotional poster for the film Hannibal
- The masks in Game of Thrones used by Faceless Men from Braavos
- The face of a guard used by Hannibal Lecter in The Silence of the Lambs

== See also ==
- Skin mask (disambiguation)
