= Bakor people =

Bakor
Languages
- Abanyom; Efutop; Befon; Isibiri; Ekajuk; Nnam

Religion
- Christianity, Bakor religion

Related ethnic groups
- Ekoi people

The Bakor people are part of the broader Ekoi people. They live in Cross River State, Nigeria.

== Culture ==
The Bakor are patrilocal, matrilineal and polygamous. Bakor people are all members of 8 matriclans: Nkim, Nkum and Ekajuk in Ogoja and Nnam, Abaniyom, Ntaa, Nselle and Ndeh in Ikom. The clans and villages are governed by elders who fulfill executive and judicial roles. Elders choose the heads of the clans and divisions of the clans, with each polity having their own particular rules for succession. Households are generally run by the mother's brothers, with them having authority over her children. The matriclans, villages and clan segments are all dominated by male leadership. Husbands also have authority over their wives' kids.

Village leaders are considered slaves to their community and are pampered, so the job is generally avoided. They have the right to marry whoever they want in the community. Although the village leaders are given respect and privileges, they can be deposed by the women of their clan.

Bakor people are agricultural, with fishing and hunting being secondary for getting food. Overall agricultural work is done by men, including the production of yams, rice, cocoa and maize. Women also produce ground peas, melon, ground beans, okra and palm kernels. Women are also restricted from harvesting from palm trees, although they do sell the goods from them. Land is owned communally by the matriclans and only men can expand its territory or set up new homes.

== Sources ==
- Ganyi, Francis Mowang; Utsalo, Carmeline Kuku (2016). "The Bakor Matrilineal Descent System: An Ethno-Linguistic Model of Female Empowerment". Journal of Advances in Humanities. 4 (5): 565–574.
