= Kajuk language =

Ekoid language spoken in Nigeria

Ekajuk
- Kajuk
- Ekajuk
- Native to: Nigeria
- Ethnicity: Bakor people
- Native speakers: 63,000 (2008)
- Language family: Niger–Congo?: Atlantic–Congo; Benue–Congo; Southern Bantoid; Ekoid; Efutop–Ekajuk; Ekajuk–Nnam; Ekajuk
- Writing system: Latin

Language codes
- ISO 639-2: eka
- ISO 639-3: eka
- Glottolog: ekaj1238
- Ekajuk-Nnam

The Kajuk language, Ekajuk (also spelled Akajo and Akajuk), is an Ekoid language (of the Niger–Congo family) spoken in the Cross River State and some surrounding regions of Nigeria.

The Ekajuk are one of several peoples who use the nsibidi ideographs.
