= Obassi =

Creator god of the people of Ekoi

Obassi is the supreme creator god of the people of Ekoi, who is based in Nigeria and Cameroon.

== Representation ==
Obassi consists of two distinct male gods, Obassi Osaw and Obassi Nsi, who originally occupied the same body. They eventually separated after creating the universe. Obassi Osaw rules over the skies, where humans are born, while Obassi Nsi rules over the Earth, where humans live and die. Obassi Osaw is featured more heavily in Ekoi myths involving the creation of natural phenomena.

== Legends ==
=== The origin of water ===
The first man, Etim ‘Ne, asked Obassi Osaw for water on earth, which had yet to exist. In response, Obassi Osaw gave Etim ‘Ne seven stones. When one of these stones was set down on earth, a body of water emerged from the location. Each body of water will then create seven new sets of stones. Etim ‘Ne and his descendants continued to make new bodies of water on Earth by putting one stone at a time in a new location. However, one of his grandchildren did not follow this rule and decided to put all seven stones in the same location, which was his farm. As a result, a great flood started and almost drowned the entire Earth. Etim ‘Ne, who was still alive, asked for Obassi Osaw’s assistance to stop the calamity from continuing. Obassi Osaw granted his request, though he left a lake behind at the location of the farm owned by the disobedient grandchild.

=== The origin of fire ===
Etim ‘Ne sent a boy to the skies to ask Obassi Osaw for fire, which he rejected. The boy decided to continue his quest, nevertheless and ingratiated himself in Obassi Osaw’s household. After proving himself by running several errands, the boy was sent by Obassi Osaw to retrieve a lamp from one of his wives. This lamp holds eternal flame inside, and the boy decided to light a log with it and brought it home to Earth. Unfortunately, Obassi Osaw found out and sent his son, Akpan Obassi, to punish the thief. His son found the boy and cursed him to never be able to walk again.

== See also ==
- List of African mythological figures
