= Nde-Nsele-Nta language =

Language of Nigeria

Nde-Nsele-Nta
- Nde
- Befon
- Native to: Nigeria
- Region: Cross River State
- Ethnicity: Bakor people
- Native speakers: (20,000 cited 1987)
- Language family: Niger–Congo?: Atlantic–Congo; Benue–Congo; Southern Bantoid; Ekoid; Efutop–Ekajuk; Nde-Nsele-Nta
- Dialects: Nde; Nsele; Nta

Language codes
- ISO 639-3: ndd
- Glottolog: nden1250
- Nde-Nsele-Nta

Nde-Nsele-Nta, or sometimes simply Nde, is an Ekoid language of Nigeria. There are three somewhat distinct dialects, Nde (60% of speakers), Nsele (Nselle), and Nta.
