= Futop language =

Ekoid language spoken in Nigeria

Efutop
- Futop
- Efutop
- Native to: Nigeria
- Region: Cross River State
- Ethnicity: Bakor people
- Native speakers: (10,000 cited 1973)
- Language family: Niger–Congo?: Atlantic–Congo; Volta-Congo; Benue–Congo; Bantoid; Southern Bantoid; Ekoid; Efutop–Ekajuk; Efutop

Language codes
- ISO 639-3: ofu
- Glottolog: efut1242
- Efutop

The Futop language, Efutop (Ofutop), is an Ekoid language of Nigeria. The E- in Efutop represents the class prefix for "language", analogous to the Bantu ki- in KiSwahili.

One of a number of similar but distinct languages spoken in the Cross River region, its area includes the town of Abaragba as well as Ekpokpa, Mkpura, Ndim, Okanga-Nkpansi, Okanga-Njimowan, and Okosura. The vocabulary for David W. Crabb's item in Ekoid Bantu Languages of Ogoja was from Mr. Anthony A. Eyam of Abaragba.

== Vocabulary ==
Some vocabulary (in a simplified orthography, without tone markings):

- nhnham - animal (low tone-low tone) nh is palatal
- nggurɛgbɛ - antelope (low-low-low-low) ng is syllabic
- obuɔ - arm, hand
- ngkuɔn - bee
- mmuɔn - child
- ofuu - day (low-high)
- nim - do (low)
- yum - dry (high tone)
- yinə - forget (high-low).
