= Nnam language =

Ekoid language spoken in Nigeria

Nnam
- Ndem
- Native to: Nigeria
- Ethnicity: Bakor people
- Native speakers: (3,000 cited 1987)
- Language family: Niger–Congo?: Atlantic–Congo; Benue–Congo; Southern Bantoid; Ekoid; Efutop–Ekajuk; Ekajuk–Nnam; Nnam

Language codes
- ISO 639-3: nbp
- Glottolog: nnam1238
- Ekajuk-Nnam

Nnam is an Ekoid language of Nigeria.
