= Ekoi religion =

Mythology of the Ekoi people of Nigeria and Cameroon

Ekoi religion is the belief system of the Ekoi people, an ethnic group primarily found in southeastern Nigeria and parts of Cameroon.

== Deities ==
In traditional Ekoi religion, there are two gods who are said to have created everything named Obassi Osaw and Obassi Nsi. Obassi Osaw is a sky deity, and is believed to give moisture and light, yet also droughts and storms. Obassi Osaw is also said to have created humans. Obassi Nsi is associated with the Earth and nurturement, and is believed to have taught humans how to hunt and grow food.

Ancestors and natural forces are also emphasized in Ekoi worship. Various Ekoi cults are devoted to the welfare of common activities, such as farming.

== Practices ==
Before the establishment of British colonial administration, the Egbo was a prominent Ekoi secret society that had strong social regulatory functions as well as influence in religious matters. Members of the Egbo used a form of ideographic writing called Nsibidi, variations of which were formerly found among other ethnic groups in southeastern Nigeria.

The Ekoi practice traditional medicine and have treated such diseases as smallpox with local medicinal plants. In addition to displaying an extensive knowledge of and aesthetic appreciation for flowers, the Ekoi create mural paintings on sanctuaries, make pottery, and carve figures in solid basaltic blocks. They are also known for their large, skin-covered masks.
