= Abanyom language =

Ekoid language spoken in Nigeria

Abanyom
- Bakor
- Native to: Nigeria
- Region: Cross River State
- Ethnicity: Bakor people
- Native speakers: (13,000 cited 1986)
- Language family: Niger–Congo?: Atlantic–Congo; Benue–Congo; Southern Bantoid; Ekoid; Efutop–Ekajuk; Abanyom

Language codes
- ISO 639-3: abm
- Glottolog: aban1242
- Abanyom-Nkem-Nkum

Abanyom, or Bakor, is a language of the Ekoid subfamily of Niger–Congo. It is spoken by the Abanyom people in the Cross River State region of Nigeria. A member of the Southern Bantoid group, Abanyom is fairly closely related to the Bantu languages. It is tonal and has a typical Niger–Congo noun class system.

Abanyom is also a clan/Ward in Ikom. It comprises the following Communities; Edor, Abangork, Akumabal, Abinti, Nkim, Nkum, Nkarassi 11, Nkarassi 1, Abankang, Etikpe, and Nkonfap. Abankang is referred to as the mother of Abanyom.

== Sources ==
- Asinya, O.E. 1987. A reconstruction of the Segmental phonology of Bakor (an Ekoid Bantu language). M.A. Linguistics, University of Port Harcourt
