= Skin mask =

Skin mask may refer to:

- A mask made of animal skin
- Facial masks, a form of cosmetic treatment
- A facial prosthetic
- A mask made of human skin
