= Nkem-Nkum language =

Ekoid language of Nigeria

Nkem-Nkum
- Isibiri
- Native to: Nigeria
- Region: Cross River State
- Ethnicity: Bakor people
- Native speakers: 51,000 (2008)
- Language family: Niger–Congo?: Atlantic–Congo; Benue–Congo; Southern Bantoid; Ekoid; Efutop–Ekajuk; Nkem-Nkum
- Dialects: Nkem; Nkum

Language codes
- ISO 639-3: isi
- Glottolog: nkem1242
- Abanyom-Nkem-Nkum

Nkem-Nkum, or Isibiri, is an Ekoid language of Nigeria. There are two somewhat distinct dialects, Nkem (Nkim) and Nkum.
