= Nsibidi =

Symbol system from Nigeria and Cameroon

- A symbol simply described as "Nsibidi name written" by Elphinstone Dayrell in 1911.
- Script type: Ideographic
- Languages: Ekoid/Ejagham, Efik, Ibibio, Igbo

Related scripts
- Child systems: Anaforuana symbols (Cuba); Veve symbols (Haiti)

Nsibidi /ˌnsɪbɪdɪ/ (also spelled Nsibiri, Nchibiddi, or Nchibiddy) is a system of symbols or proto-writing developed by the Ejagham people in the cross river region of Nigeria and south-western part of Cameroon. They are classified as pictograms, though there have been suggestions that some are logograms or syllabograms.

Nsibidi is used on wall designs, calabashes, metals (such as bronze), leaves, swords, and tattoos, primarily by the Mgbe and Ekpe (Ngbe/Egbo) leopard societies found across old Cross River region among the Ekoi, Igbo, Efik, Bahumono, and other nearby peoples.

Before the colonial period of Nigerian history, Nsibidi was divided into a sacred version and a public, more decorative version which could be used by women. The onset of colonialism and associated disempowerment of various traditional "secret societies" may have further driven its secrecy. Nsibidi was transported to Cuba and Haiti via the Atlantic slave trade, where it developed into the Anaforuana and Veve symbols.

== History ==
=== Etymology ===
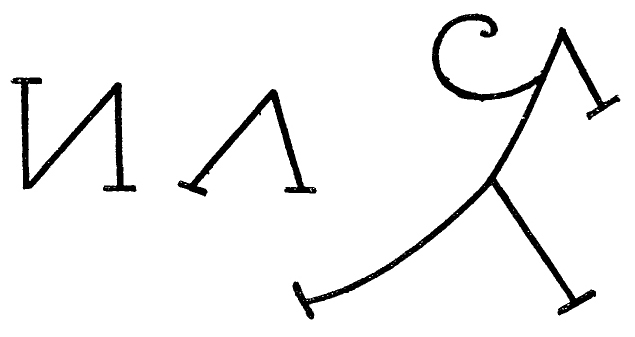
The name of a boy called 'Onuaha' as recorded by J. K. Macgregor in 1909. Macgregor interpreted the first two symbols as corruptions of the Latin letters 'N' and 'A' and the last symbol a generic Nsibidi sign. Macgregor noted the growing European influence on Nsibidi.

Robert Farris Thompson glosses the Ekoid word nsibidi as translating to "cruel letters", from sibi "bloodthirsty". The context is the use of the symbols in the Mgbe and Ekpe society by the Old Calabar slave traders who had established a "lavish system of human sacrifice".

=== Origin ===
The origin of Nsibidi is now generally attributed to the Ekoi or Ejagham people of the Cross River region, though in the 1900s J. K. Macgregor recorded a native tradition attributing it to the Uguakima or Uyanga section of the Igbo people. However, the Nsibidi of the Ejagham people predates Macgregor's stay in the area and he may have been misled by his informants. A few years later, the anthropologist Percy Amaury Talbot was unable to verify the tradition recorded by Macgregor and concluded that the claims of the Ekoi to have created the system were more plausible.

=== Status ===
Nsibidi has a wide vocabulary of signs usually imprinted on calabashes, brass ware, textiles, wood sculptures, masquerade costumes, buildings and on human skin. Nsibidi has been described as a "fluid system" of communication consisting of hundreds of abstract and pictographic signs. In the colonial era, Nsibidi was characterized by Talbot as "a kind of primitive secret writing", with Talbot explaining that it was used for messages "cut or painted on split palm stems". Macgregor's view was that "The use of nsibidi is that of ordinary writing. I have in my possession a copy of the record of a court case from a town of Enion [Enyong] taken down in it, and every detail ... is most graphically described". Nsibidi crossed ethnic lines and was a uniting factor among ethnic groups in the Cross River region. In old Cross River region, Nsibidi is mostly associated with the Ejagham men’s Mgbe society and later the Ekpe men’s society.

=== Identification by Europeans ===
The symbol system was first encountered by Europeans like Charles Partridge, a British Assistant District Colonial officer and anthropologist who discovered the Ikom Monoliths (also known as the Bakor or Akwanshi Monoliths) in 1903 on the banks of the Aweyong River. Description of the Circles of Upright Sculptured Stones on the Left Bank of the Aweyong River in the Ikom region of southeast Nigeria, dated to roughly the 5th Century. He specifically mentioned the occurrence of these stones in such places as Etiningnta (Itinta), Agba, Iseni (Abinti nsene) and Anop (Alok). He also indicated that he saw some in Okuni, near Ikom while a cluster of stones were also found in the village of Abuntak Isam in the Ekajuk village group of Ogoja district. Partridge who also first drew attention to the relationship between the cicatrices on these stones and the tattoo marks he noticed among the indigenes, especially women of the area. A further work by P. A. Talbot, In the Shadow of The Bush (1912) took time to document the elaborate veneration of stones as objects of ritual and worship by Ejagham people. He also underscored the organic relationship between the tattoos found on the bodies of Ejagham people and the designs on some of these stones, going further to explain for the first time that these tattoos and designs were indeed, a form of indigenous writing called Nsibidi.

In 1926, in another book, The Peoples of Southern Nigeria, vol II that he specifically and graphically documented the existence of the monoliths:

The finest stone circle seen by me is in the country of the Nuamm at Nyerekpong, a few miles north of Atamm... It is about twenty-five yards in diameter, but only eight monoliths, composed of a shelly limestone, are now left, one of which has fallen... The Nuamm stated that they only knew them under the name Etal, “The Stones”... They assured me that there are finer circles at Alokk, a few miles to the east in which the stones are bigger as well as better carved. Another ring but of much smaller and uncut stones is to be found at Ogomogom...

Talbot went further to document the existence of monoliths in other parts of Ejagham territory including Mandak in Ekajuk, Etinta, Ndurakpe and Olulumo as well as Mfum and Agbokim in present day Ikom and Etung local government Areas respectively.

The symbol system was also encountered by Europeans in 1904. Excavation of terracotta vessels, headrests, and anthropomorphic figurines from the Calabar region of southeast Nigeria, dated to roughly the 5th to 15th centuries, that revealed "an iconography readily comparable" to Nsibidi

== Uses ==
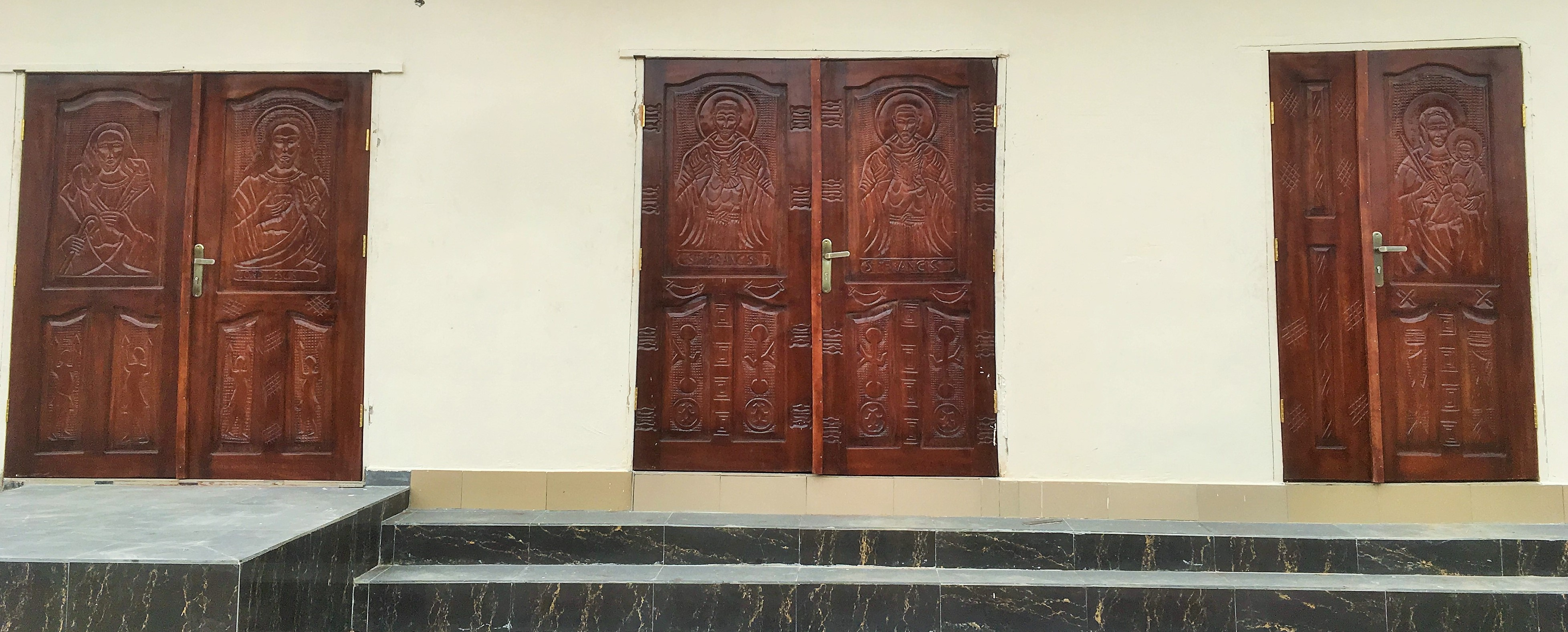
Contemporary Igbo art: carved mahogany doors covered in Nsibidi symbolism and Christian iconography in Aba, Nigeria

=== Court cases – "Ikpe" ===
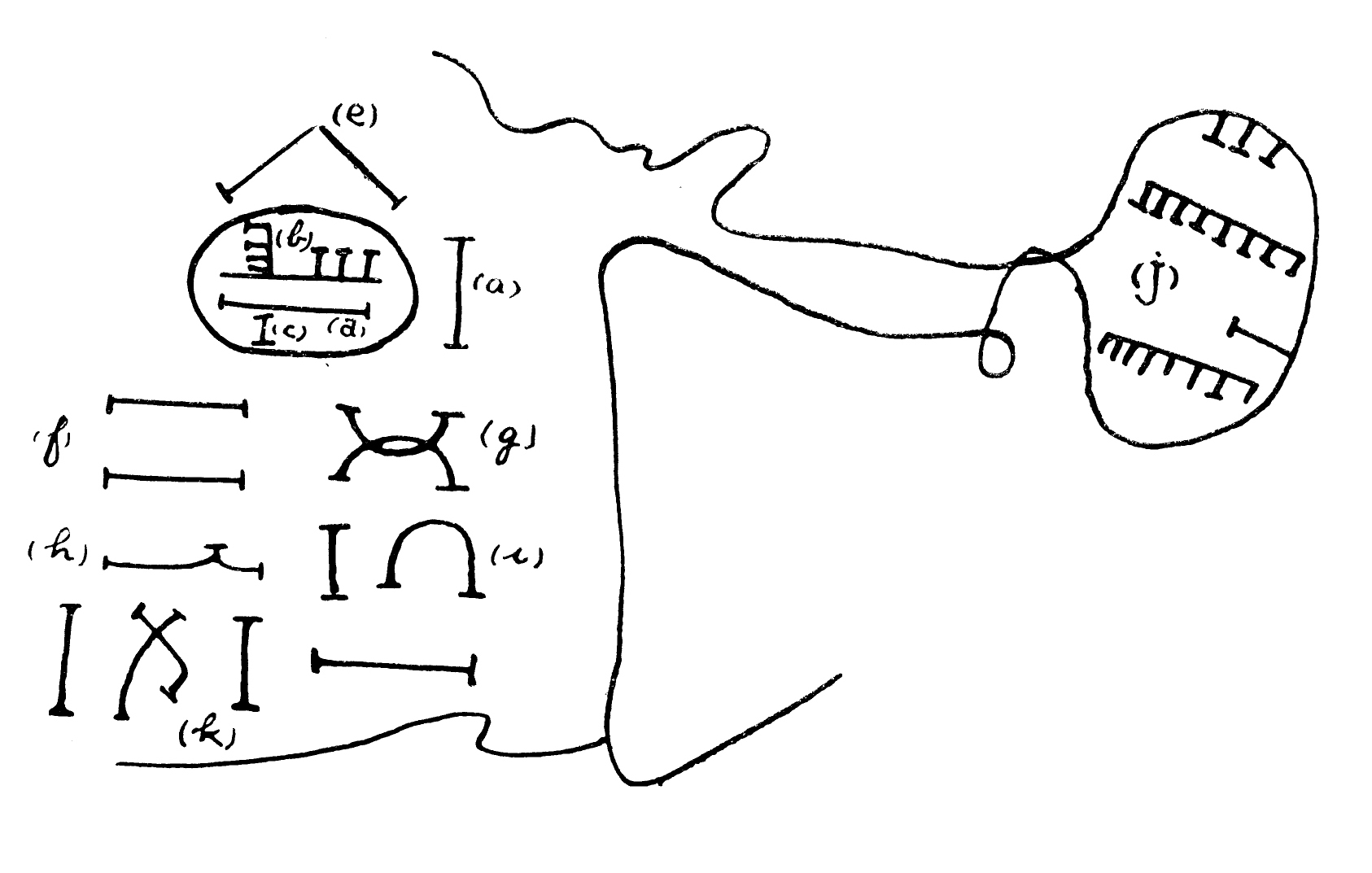
The Ikpe from Enyong written in Nsibidi as recorded by J. K. Macgregor

Nsibidi was used in judgement cases known as 'Ikpe' in Enion, an Igbo subgroup, according to Macgregor, who was able to retrieve and translate an Nsibidi record of an ikpe judgement.

The record is of an Ikpe or judgement case. (a) The court was held under a tree as is the custom, (b) the parties in the case, (c) the chief who judged it, (d) his staff (these are enclosed in a circle), (e) is a man whispering into the ear of another just outside the circle of those concerned, (f) denotes all the members of the party who won the case. Two of them (g) are embracing, (h) is a man who holds a cloth between his finger and thumbs as a sign of contempt. He does not care for the words spoken. The lines round and twisting mean that the case was a difficult one which the people of the town could not judge for themselves. So they sent to the surrounding towns to call the wise men from them and the case was tried by them (j) and decided; (k) denotes that the case was one of adultery or No. 20.

=== Ukara Ekpe ===
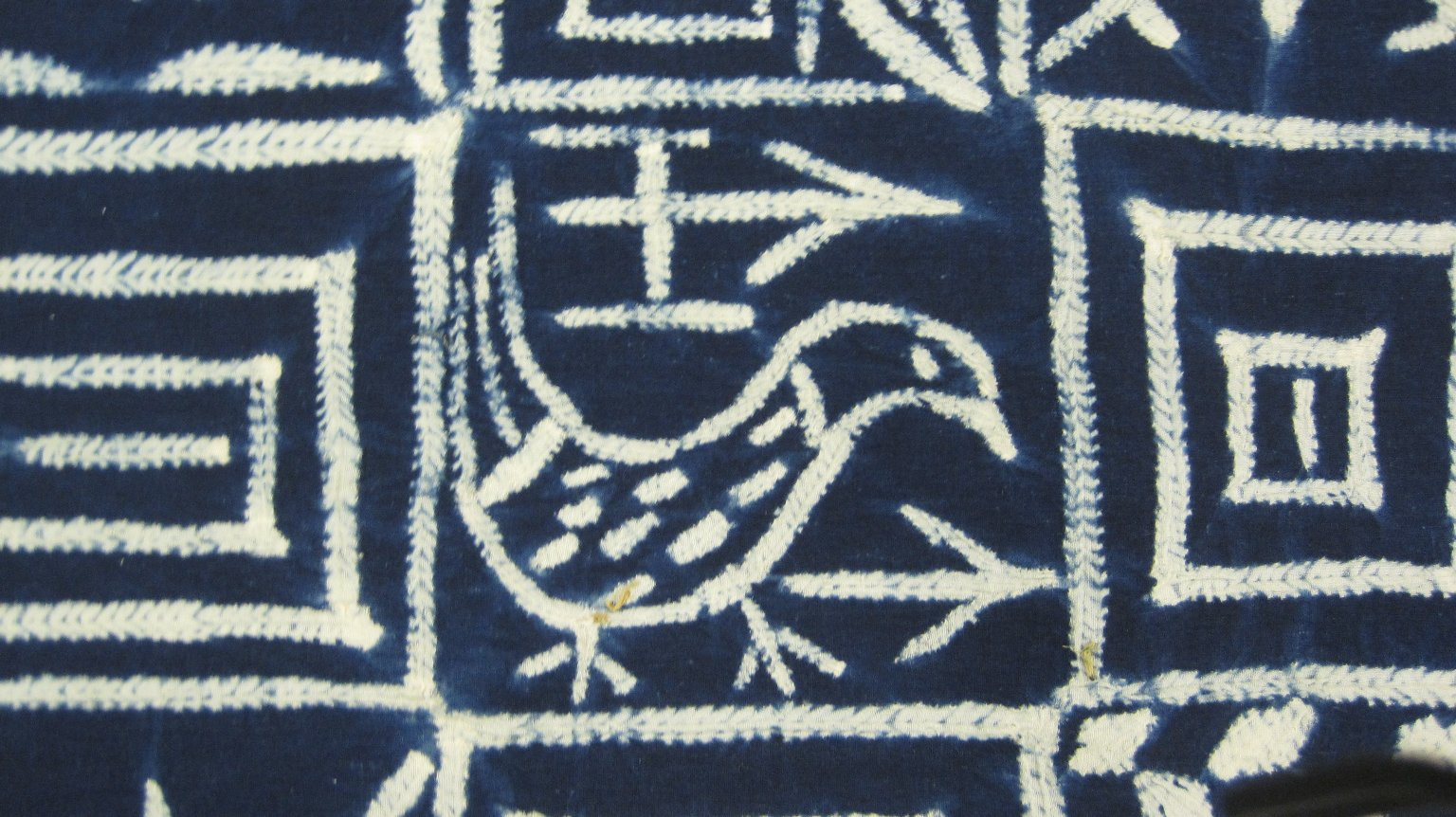
Nsibidi on the Igbo 'Ukara' cloth of the Ekpe society

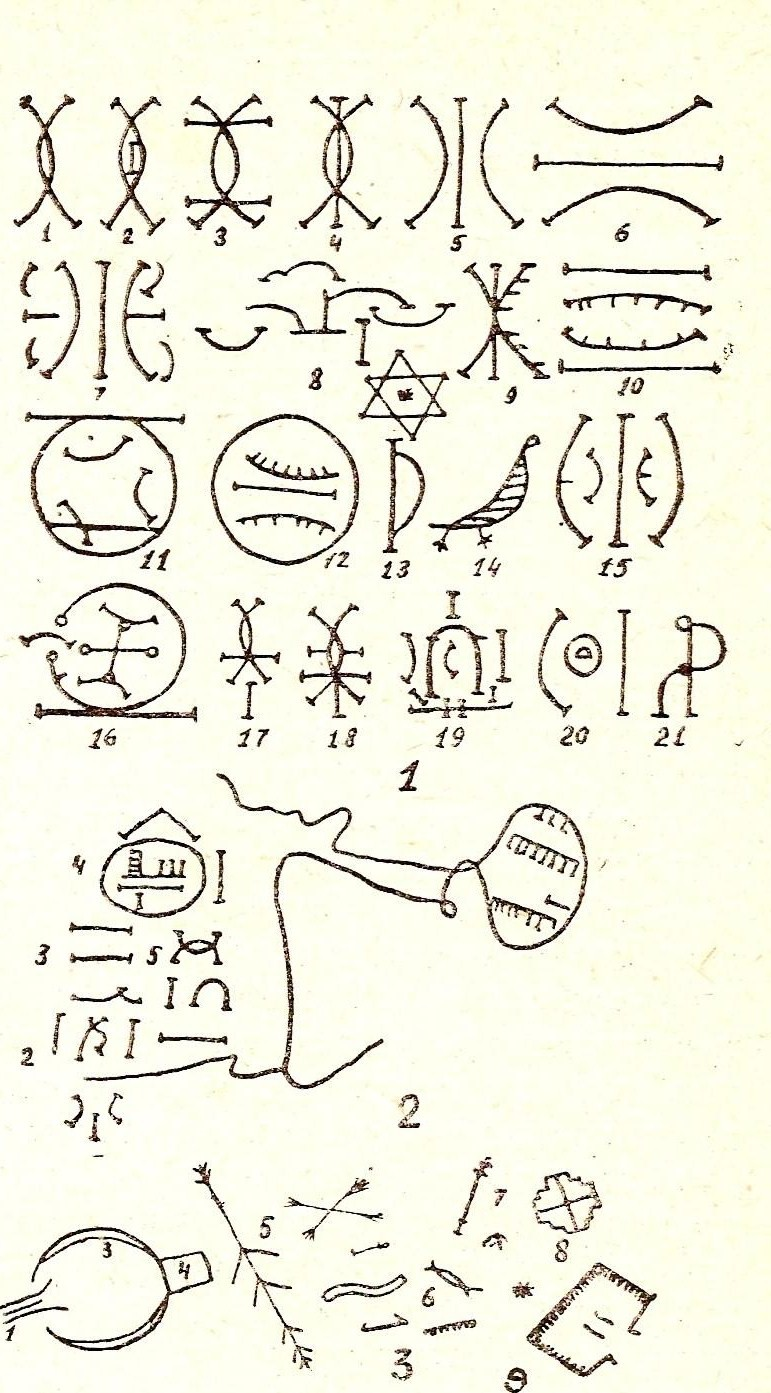
Various Nsibidi symbols

Nsibidi is used to design the 'ukara ekpe' woven material which is usually dyed blue (but also green and red) and is covered in Nsibidi symbols and motifs. Ukara ekpe cloths are woven in Abakaliki, and then they are designed by male Nsibidi artists in the Igbo-speaking towns of Abiriba, Arochukwu and Ohafia to be worn by members of the Ekpe society. Symbols including lovers, metal rods, trees, feathers, hands in friendship war and work, masks, moons, and stars are dyed onto ukara cloths. The cloth is dyed by post-menopausal women in secret, and young males in public. Ukara was a symbol of wealth and power only handled by titled men and post-menopausal women.

Ukara can be worn as a wrapper (a piece of clothing) on formal occasions, and larger version are hung in society meeting houses and on formal occasions. Ukara motifs are designed in white and are placed on grids set against an indigo background. Some of the designs include abstract symbols representing the Ekpe society such as repeating triangles representing the leopard's claws and therefore Ekpe's power. Ukara includes naturalistic designs representing objects such as gongs, feathers and manilla currency, a symbol of wealth. Powerful animals are included, specifically the leopard and crocodile.

== In popular culture ==
Nsibidi plays a central role in the Nsibidi Script Series of fantasy novels (Akata Witch, Akata Warrior, and Akata Woman) written by Nnedi Okorafor.

Nsibidi was the inspiration for the Wakandan writing system shown in the 2018 film Black Panther. Nsibidi symbols were also featured in its sequel, Wakanda Forever.

Nsibidi has also inspired some modern constructed writing systems intended for real-world use, which have been referred to as "Neo-Nsibidi". One such project, Akagu (meaning "leopard claw"), aims to assimilate Nsibidi characters as logographs into a novel, alphabetized system for recording the Igbo language; the intent being that these symbols might disambiguate homonyms.

== Examples of Nsibidi ==
Below are some examples of Nsibidi recorded by J. K. Macgregor (1909) and Elphinstone Dayrell (1910 and 1911) for The Journal of the Royal Anthropological Institute of Great Britain and Ireland and Man. Both of them recorded symbols from a variety of locations around the Cross River, and especially the Ikom district in what is now Cross River State. Both of the writers used informants to retrieve Nsibidi that were regarded as secret and visited several Cross River communities.

"Nsibidi"
"Welcome"
"Two men talking"
"Door"
"Gun"
"Crossbow"

"Calabash"
"Big drum"
"Etak Ntaña Nsibidi — Nsibidi's bunch of plantains. When the head of the house wants plantains he sends this sign to the head boy on the farm."
"Umbrella"
"Toilet soap"

"Matchet"
"Woman"
"Man"
"Moon"
"Tortoise"

== See also ==
- Writing systems of Africa
- Africa Alphabet
- African reference alphabet
