= Mbe language =

Ekoid language of Nigeria

Mbe
- M̀bè
- Pronunciation: [m̀bè]
- Native to: Nigeria
- Region: Ogoja, Cross River State
- Ethnicity: Mbube people
- Native speakers: 65,000 (2011)
- Language family: Niger–Congo?: Atlantic-Congo; Volta-Congo; Benue-Congo; Bantoid; Southern Bantoid; Ekoid–Mbe; Mbe

Language codes
- ISO 639-3: mfo
- Glottolog: mbee1249

- People: Mbube
- Language: M̀bè

Mbe is a language spoken by the Mbube people of the Ogoja, Cross River State region of Nigeria, numbering about 65,000 people in 2011. As the closest relative of the Ekoid family of the Southern Bantoid languages, Mbe is fairly close to the Bantu languages. It is tonal and has a typical Niger–Congo noun-class system.

== Phonology ==
=== Vowels ===
Vowels are i e ɛ a ɔ o u.

=== Consonants ===
Mbe has a rather elaborate consonant inventory compared to the Ekoid languages, presumably due to contact from neighbouring Upper Cross River languages.

All Mbe consonants apart from the labial–velars (kp ɡb w) and n have labialised counterparts. (/jʷ/ is presumably [ɥ].) In addition, the non-labialised peripheral stops (m p b k ɡ; palatalised ŋ would be ɲ) and the liquids (l r) have palatalised counterparts.

m mʷ mʲ	n	ɲ ɲʷ	ŋ ŋʷ	
p pʷ pʲ	t tʷ		k kʷ̜ kʷ̹ kʲ	kp
b bʷ bʲ	d dʷ		ɡ ɡʷ ɡʲ	ɡb
	ts tsʷ	tʃ tʃʷ		
	dz dzʷ	dʒ dʒʷ		
f fʷ	s sʷ	ʃ ʃʷ		
	r rʷ lʲ			
	l lʷ lʲ	j jʷ		w

There are a few consonants that only occur in ideophones, such as /fʲ hʲ/.

An interesting additional contrast is between fortis and lenis /kʷ/. Fortis (long?) /kʷ̹/ half-rounds a following vowel such as /e/, whereas lenis /kʷ̜/ does not. This distinction may be being lost. (Blench)

=== Tone ===
Tones are high, low, rising, falling and a downstep; rising and falling may be tone sequences.
