= Ikom monoliths =

Coordinates: 6°N 8.5°E

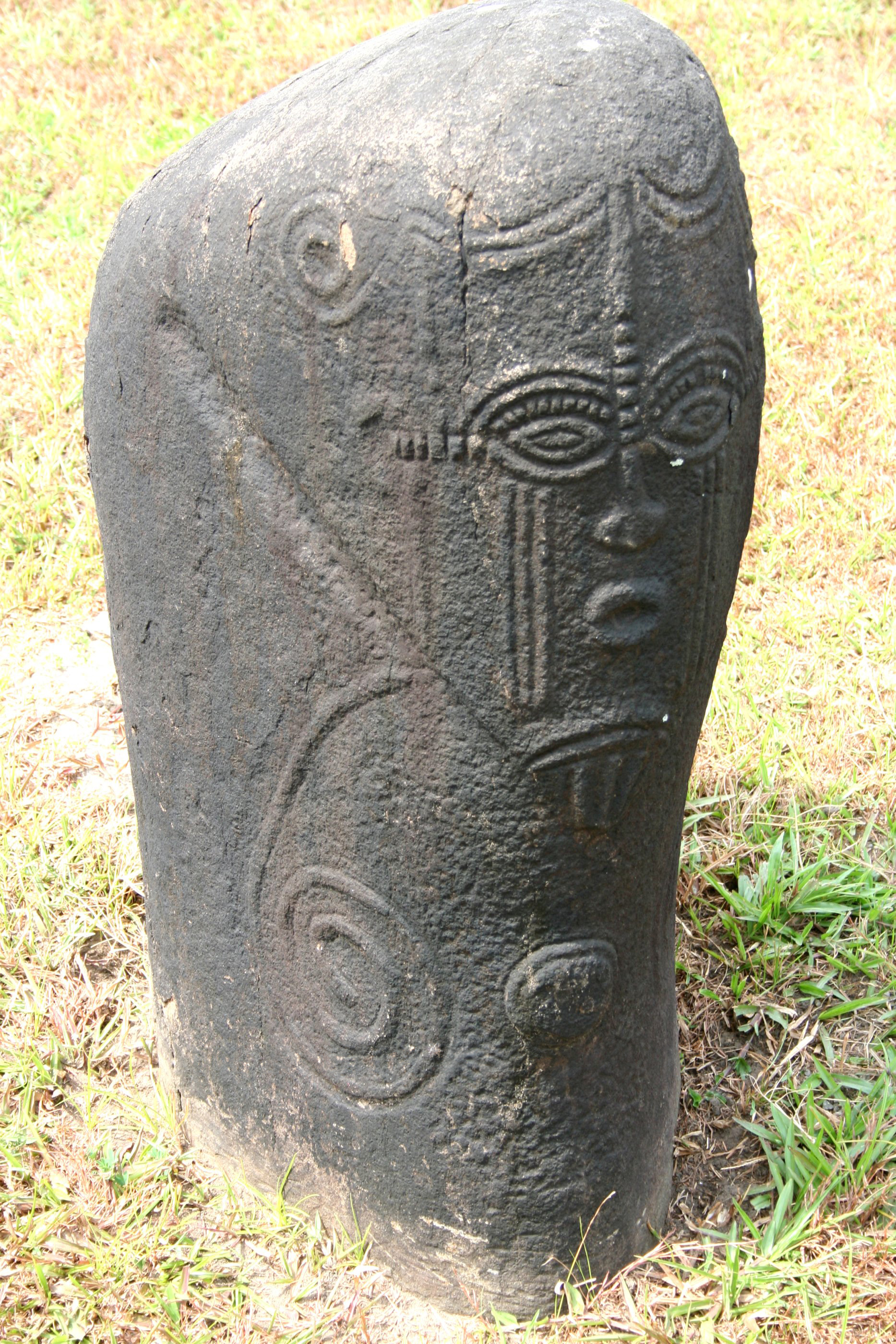
Ikom monolith, Calabar Museum

The Ikom monoliths are a series of volcanic-stone monoliths from the area of Ikom, Cross River State, Nigeria. The Ejagham may have engraved the monoliths around 200 CE. The monoliths are also called Akwaanshi or Atal among the Ejagham people.

== Description ==
The stones are distributed among over thirty communities, in each community, they are found in circles, facing each other erect. Numbering about 300 in total, the monoliths are between 0.3 m (0.98 ft) and 1.8 m (5.9 ft) high and are laid out in some thirty circles located around Alok in the Ikom area of Cross River State. They may be located in the central meeting place of the village or in the uncultivated area outside the village. The monoliths are carved in hard, medium-textured basaltic rock, a few are carved in sandstone and shelly limestone; they are phallic in form and some feature stylized faces as well as decorative patterns and inscriptions. Although the carvings have not been deciphered, researchers and linguists believe that the inscriptions may represent a form of writing and visual communication.

== Conservation risk ==
Exposure to extreme weather conditions have put these monoliths at risk of erosion and deterioration. The monoliths are also located in an area where the nearby people do not commonly see their worth as tourist attractions. They were added to the World Monuments Fund's list of sites in danger in 2008. In 2020, Ikom monoliths were found by U.S Customs and Border Protection at Miami International Airport under fraudulent documents. At the time of the seizure, CBP officials indicated that the artifacts would be returned to Cameroon. The artifacts will be returned to Cross River (Nigeria). The smuggling of Ikom monoliths to the US highlights the shortage of heritage and archeology staff in the Nigerian public administration.

== Museum collections ==
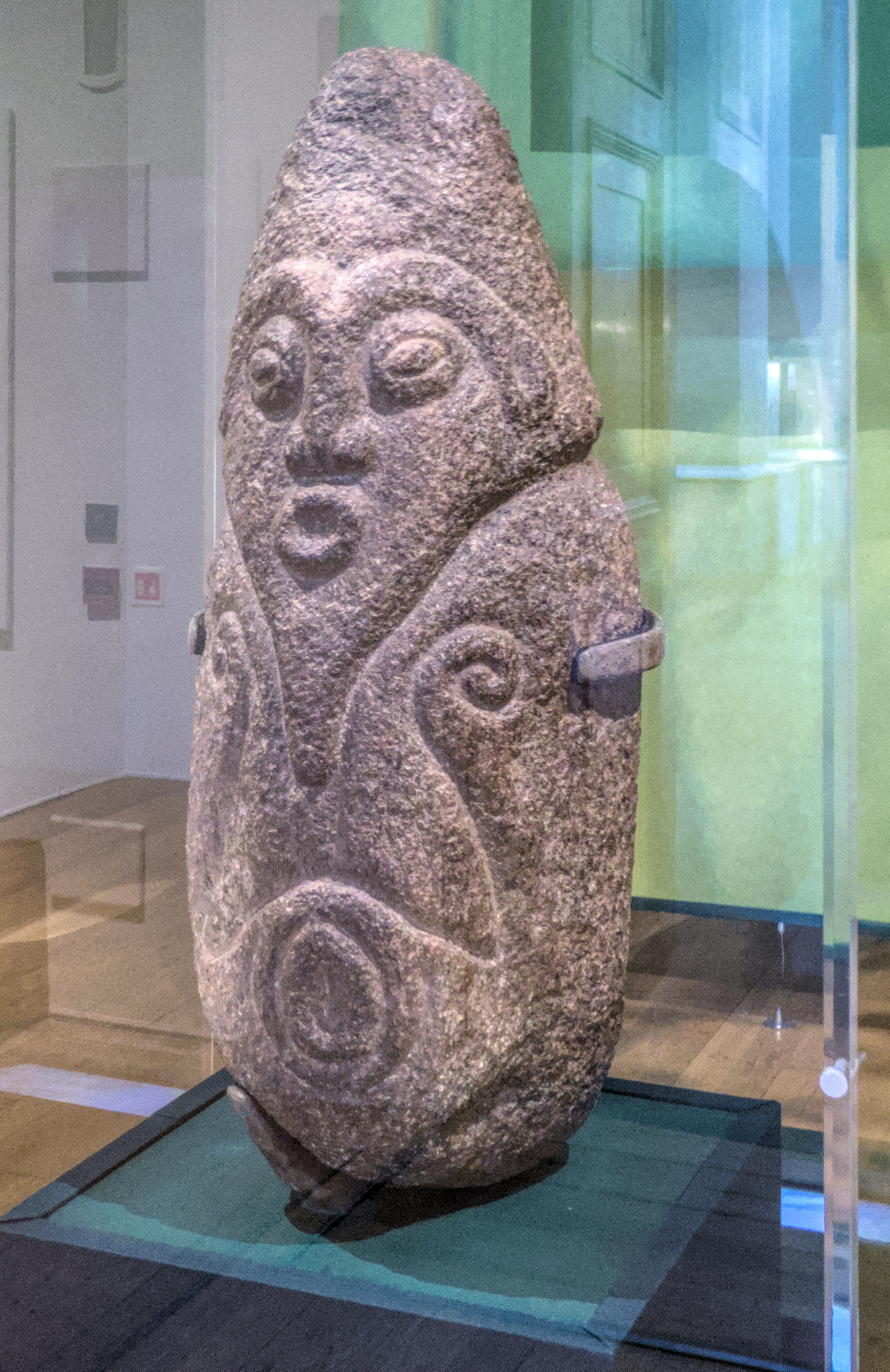
Ikom monolith in the British Museum

A medium-sized example of an Ikom monolith with human facial features can be found in the British Museum's collection.

The monoliths can be found in the Ikom area of Cross river, Nigeria.
