= Ekoid languages =

Ekoid
- Geographic distribution: Southeastern Nigeria, western Cameroon
- Linguistic classification: Niger–Congo?: Atlantic–Congo; Volta-Congo; Benue–Congo; Bantoid; Southern Bantoid; Ekoid–Mbe; Ekoid
- Subdivisions: Ndoe; Ekoi; Efutop–Ekajuk

Language codes
- Glottolog: ekoi1236
- The Ekoid languages (plus Mbe) shown within Nigeria and Cameroon: Ekoid–Mbe: Mbe Ekoid: Ndoe (core): Ejagham Efutop Nde-Nsele-Nta Abanyom-Nkem-Nkum Ekajuk-Nnam

The Ekoid languages are a dialect cluster of Southern Bantoid languages spoken principally in southeastern Nigeria and in adjacent regions of Cameroon. They have long been associated with the Bantu languages, without their status being precisely defined. Crabb (1969) remains the major monograph on these languages, although regrettably, Part II, which was to contain grammatical analyses, was never published. Crabb also reviews the literature on Ekoid up to the date of publication.

The nearby Mbe language is the closest relative of Ekoid and forms with it the Ekoid–Mbe branch of Southern Bantoid.

== Languages ==
Ethnologue lists the following Ekoid varieties with the status of independent languages. Branching is from Watters (1978) and Yoder et al. (2009).

- Ekoid
  - Ndoe
    - Ejagham (Ekoi)
    - Efutop–Ekajuk
      - Efutop
      - Nde-Nsele-Nta
      - Abanyom
      - Nkem-Nkum
      - Ekajuk–Nnam

== Names and locations (Nigeria) ==
Below is a list of language names, populations, and locations (in Nigeria only) from Blench (2019).

	Language	Cluster	Dialects	Alternate spellings	Own name for language	Endonym(s)	Other names (location-based)	Other names for language	Exonym(s)	Speakers	Location(s)
Bakor cluster	Bakor										
Abanyom	Bakor					Abanyom, Abanyum	Befun, Bofon, Mbofon		12,500 (1986)	Cross River State, Ikom LGA, main village Abangkang	
Efutop	Bakor		Ofutop			Agbaragba			8,740 (1953), 10,000 (1973 SIL)	Cross River State, Ikom LGA	
Ekajuk	Bakor		Akajuk						more than 10,000 (Crabb 1965); 30,000 (1986 Asinya)	Cross River State, Ogoja LGA, Bansara, Nwang, Ntara 1,2 and 3, and Ebanibim towns	
Nde–Nsele–Nta cluster	Bakor								10,000 (1973 SIL)	Cross River State, Ikom LGA	
Nde	Bakor						Ekamtulufu, Mbenkpe, Udom, Mbofon, Befon		4,000 (1953); est. 12,000 (Asinya 1987)		
Nsele	Bakor		Nselle						1,000 (1953); est. 3,000 (Asinya 1987)		
Nta	Bakor				Atam, Afunatam				est. 4,500 (Asinya 1987)		
Nkem–Nkum cluster	Bakor									Cross River State, Ogoja LGA	
Nkem	Bakor	Nkim, Ogoja, Ishibori, Isibiri, Ogboja	Nkim			Ogoja	Ishibori		11,000 (1953); est 18,000 (Asinya 1987)		
Nkum	Bakor								5,700 (1953); est. 16,500 (Asinya 1987)		
Nnam	Bakor						Ndem		1,230 (1953); est. 3,000 (Asinya 1987)	Cross River State, Ikom and Ogoja LGAs	
Ejagham cluster	Ejagham	5 dialects in Nigeria, 4 in Cameroon						Ekoi (Efik name)	80,000 total: 45,000 in Nigeria, 35,000 in Cameroon (1982 SIL)	Cross River State, Akamkpa, Ikom, Odukpani and Calabar LGAs, and in Cameroon	
Bendeghe	Ejagham		Bindege, Bindiga, Dindiga				Mbuma			Cross River State, Ikom LGA	
Etung North	Ejagham					Icuatai			13,900 (1963)	Cross River State, Ikom LGA	
Etung South	Ejagham								4,200 (1963)	Cross River State, Ikom and Akamkpa LGAs	
Ejagham	Ejagham						Ekwe, Ejagam, Akamkpa			Cross River State, Akamkpa LGA and in Cameroon	
Ekin	Ejagham					Qua, Kwa, Aqua	Abakpa		900 active adult males (1944–45): bilingual in Efik (Cook 1969b)	Cross River State, Odukpani and Calabar LGAs	
Ndoe cluster	Ndoe								3,000 (1953)	Cross River State, Ikom LGA	
Ekparabong	Ndoe		Akparabong						Towns above 2,102 and 310, respectively, (1953)	Akparabong Town, Bendeghe Affi	
Balep	Ndoe						Anep, Anyeb		619 (1953)	Balep and Opu	
Mbe		Idum, Ikumtale, Odaje		Mbe	M̀ bè		Ketuen, Mbube (Western)		9,874 (1963); 14,300 (1973 SIL); 20-30,000 (2008 est.). 7 villages (Bansan, Benkpe, Egbe, Ikumtak, Idibi, Idum, Odajie)	Cross River State, Ogoja LGA	

== Phonology ==
Proto-Ekoid is reconstructed with the following vowels and tones: */i e ɛ a ɔ o u/; high, low, rising, falling, and downstep. The rising and falling tones, though, might be composite.

It is thought to have the following consonants:

	Labial	Alveolar	Palatal / Postalveolar	Velar	Labiovelar
Nasal	m	n	ɲ~ŋ		ŋm
Stop / Affricate	p b	t d	tʃ dʒ	k ɡ	kp ɡb
Fricative	f v	s z	ʃ		
Rhotic		r			
Approximant	β	l	j	ɣ	w

[ɲ] occurs at the beginning of a word, and [ŋ] in the middle or at the end.

== Study ==
The first publication of Ekoid material is in Clarke (1848) where five ‘dialects’ are listed and a short wordlist of each is given. Other major early publications are Koelle (1854), Thomas (1914) and Johnston (1919–1922). Although Koelle lumped his specimens in the same area, it seems that Cust (1883) was the first to link them together and place them in a group co-ordinate with Bantu but not within it. Thomas (1927) is the first author to make a correct classification of Ekoid Bantu, but oddly the much later Westermann & Bryan (1952) repeats an older, inaccurate classification. This also propagated another old error and included the Nyang languages with Ekoid. Nyang languages have their own quite distinct characteristics and are probably further from Bantu than Ekoid.

Guthrie (1967–1971) could not accept that Ekoid formed part of Bantu. His first improbable explanation was that its ‘Bantuisms’ resulted from speakers of a Bantu language being ‘absorbed’ by those who spoke a ‘Western Sudanic’ language, in other words, the apparent parallels, were simply a massive block of loanwords. This was later modified into ‘Ekoid languages may to some extent share an origin with some of the A zone languages, but they seem to have undergone considerable perturbations’ (Guthrie 1971, II:15). Williamson (1971) in an influential classification of Benue–Congo assigned Ekoid to ‘Wide Bantu’ or what would now be called Bantoid, a rather untidy mass of languages lying somehow between Bantu and the remainder of Benue–Congo.

All modern classifications of Ekoid are based on Crabb (1969) and when Watters (1981) came to explore the proto-phonology of Ekoid, he used this source, rather than his own field material from the Ejagham dialects in Cameroon. A problematic aspect of Crabb is his notation of Ekoid which does not clearly distinguish phonetic from phonemic transcription. Fresh work on Ejagham by Watters (1980, 1981) has extended our knowledge of the Cameroonian dialects of Ekoid. However, an important unpublished dissertation by Asinya (1987) based in fresh fieldwork in Nigeria made an important claim about Ekoid phonology, namely that most Ekoid languages have long/short distinctions in the vowels. Ekoid has raised particular interest among Bantuists because it has a noun-class system that seems close to Bantu and yet it cannot be said to correspond exactly (Watters 1980).

== See also ==
- Ekoid word lists (Wiktionary)
