= Ikom =

- City and LGA
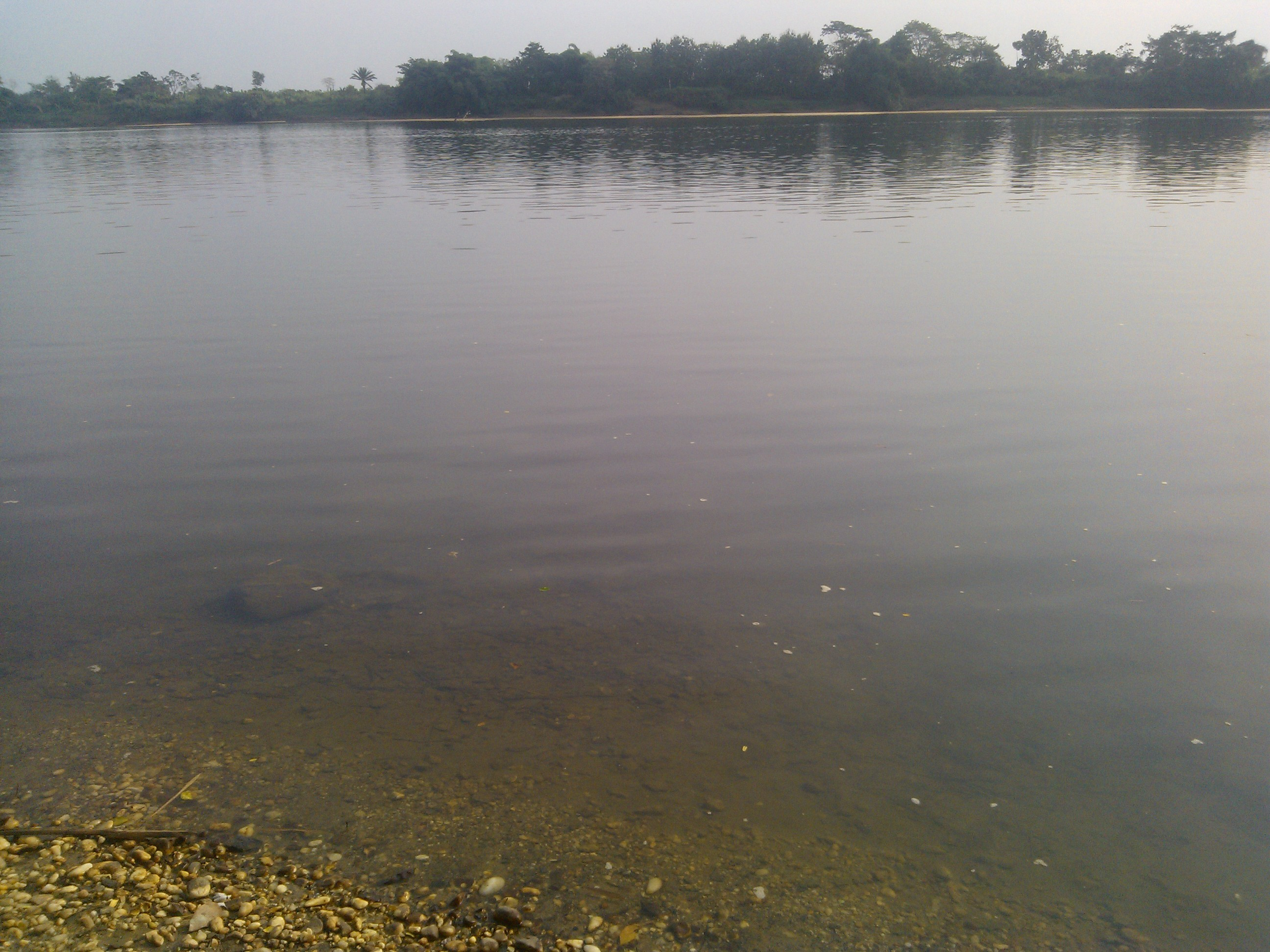
- The Cross River
- Interactive map of Ikom
- Location in Nigeria
- Coordinates: 6°05′N 8°37′E
- Country: Nigeria
- State: Cross River State

Government
  - Local Government Chairman: Mercy Nsor

Area
  - Total: 1,961 km^{2} (757 sq mi)

Population (2016 census)
  - Total: 79,103
  - Density: 40.34/km^{2} (104.5/sq mi)
- Time zone: UTC+1 (WAT)
- 3-digit postal code prefix: 551
- ISO 3166 code: NG.CR.IK
- Website: www.crossriverhub.com.ng/ikom

Ikom is a city and Local Government Area of Cross River State in South-South, Nigeria. It is located in the east of the area on the Cross River and the A4 highway at 5°57′40″N 8°42′39″E.

It has an area of 1,961 km^{2} (757 sq mi) and had a population of 162,383 according to the 2006 census.

The people of Ikom are mostly farmers. Ikom is a major producer of cocoa, bananas and plantains for the Nigerian market.

Ikom is known for the Afi monoliths, artifacts that bear an ancient writing sometimes taken to be an early form of nsibidi.

The postal code of the area is 551.

Ikom Local Government is in the Central Senatorial District of Cross River State.

Ikom with a large size of 1,861.926 square kilometres is bounded on the North by Ogoja on the North-East by Boki, on the East by Etung Local Government, and South by Obubra Local Government Area.

The major languages of the people include Ofutop Bakor, Yala, Mbembe and Ejagham. Ikom people are said to have originated from Bantu stock and their major occupation include farming trading and lumbering.

== Culture ==
According to historical facts, the slave trade brought about social disruption to Ikom such that it now broke into different independent units left to attend individually to their needs, including defence. But one thing that is common among them is their reverence for traditional institutions and their accessories as symbolized by deities, dance, festivals, Folk love and so on.

== Economy ==
=== Tourism ===
In Ikom, the relics of early European traders, who transacted business along the Cross River Coast in Okangha, Abaragba, Okundi and Ikom urban, are still very much on the ground. These include the ancient architectural structures, which served as their residence and offices.

Similarly, the Ikom Town Beach is a tourist delight, located about four kilometers from the Ikom local government headquarters. The dandy beach also serves as a relaxation spot for fun-seekers.

Another remarkable tourist attraction is the Alok and Nkarasi, where carved monoliths are sited. The monoliths, also found in Nta-Nsellei Akaju, Abanyou, and Nde, are made from either basalt or limestone. The Nta and Nselle people call the a carved monoliths “Akwanshi” meaning “dead person on ground” while others refer to it as “atal” meaning “the stones” These historical artifacts consist of a number of groves containing circles of stones carved in low relief in a variety of human figures, with an annual festival held in the groves (play ground) at the end of every dry season.

=== Investment opportunities and potential ===
Prominent among the forest resources in Ikom are mahogany, iroko, aphoria (black and white) opepe, Obeche, teak, mangrove and Ebong. Investors are trickling into and seize the opportunity to set up wood based furniture industries to process the products into finished goods for local consumption and even for export. Besides, Ikom forest has a wide variety of animals facing the threat of extinction. These include monkeys, leopards and bush pigs etc.

=== Minerals ===
In addition to the agricultural products, commonly found in the area are salt brine deposits at akparabong. These deposits are commercially viable for large scale exploitation. Baryte is also found in Ekukunela (Ofutop) in commercial quantity, unexploited.and that's it.

=== Production of foodstuff ===
Ikom is endowed with soil that not only accommodates the growth of cocoa but generously produces fine succulent plantain and banana. Yam, maize and coco-yam are also grown there in large quantities. These products are often taken from there to the northern parts of the country, to Calabar as well as to other eastern states.

In March 2021, 7,000 t (15,000,000 lb) of cocoa beans were transported from the ECM terminal at the Calabar seaport in Cross River State, South-South Nigeria to the United States of America. The cocoa beans were sourced 100 percent from Ikom. This marked a turning point for Cross River's states export industry.

== Climate ==
Ikom has a tropical climate with a short dry season and a lengthy wet season. (Köppen: Aw/Am).

Climate data for Ikom (1991–2020)
Month	Jan	Feb	Mar	Apr	May	Jun	Jul	Aug	Sep	Oct	Nov	Dec	Year
Record high °C (°F)	38.6 (101.5)	39.6 (103.3)	39 (102)	38.4 (101.1)	36.9 (98.4)	34.2 (93.6)	34 (93)	32.9 (91.2)	39 (102)	39.5 (103.1)	37.2 (99.0)	36.2 (97.2)	39.6 (103.3)
Mean daily maximum °C (°F)	33.2 (91.8)	35.0 (95.0)	34.8 (94.6)	33.4 (92.1)	32.5 (90.5)	30.9 (87.6)	29.6 (85.3)	29.0 (84.2)	30.3 (86.5)	31.3 (88.3)	32.3 (90.1)	32.6 (90.7)	32.1 (89.8)
Daily mean °C (°F)	26.8 (80.2)	28.7 (83.7)	29.2 (84.6)	28.4 (83.1)	27.7 (81.9)	26.7 (80.1)	26.1 (79.0)	25.7 (78.3)	26.4 (79.5)	26.9 (80.4)	27.4 (81.3)	26.6 (79.9)	27.2 (81.0)
Mean daily minimum °C (°F)	20.4 (68.7)	22.4 (72.3)	23.7 (74.7)	23.4 (74.1)	23.0 (73.4)	22.8 (73.0)	22.7 (72.9)	22.6 (72.7)	22.5 (72.5)	22.5 (72.5)	22.2 (72.0)	20.5 (68.9)	22.4 (72.3)
Record low °C (°F)	13.7 (56.7)	15 (59)	18 (64)	17 (63)	17 (63)	15 (59)	17 (63)	17 (63)	15.4 (59.7)	19 (66)	14.3 (57.7)	14.5 (58.1)	13.7 (56.7)
Average precipitation mm (inches)	10.0 (0.39)	37.9 (1.49)	86.0 (3.39)	168.1 (6.62)	262.8 (10.35)	361.4 (14.23)	328.2 (12.92)	326.5 (12.85)	351.5 (13.84)	326.9 (12.87)	65.2 (2.57)	6.6 (0.26)	2,331.1 (91.78)
Average precipitation days (≥ 1.0 mm)	1.0	2.5	6.0	10.7	15.6	19.3	19.6	20.2	20.7	19.2	4.7	0.6	140.2
Average relative humidity (%)	73.1	76.0	83.2	86.7	88.7	90.0	90.4	90.3	90.7	90.6	85.9	76.3	85.2
Source: NOAA

== See also ==
- Ikom monoliths
- Agbokim waterfalls
