= Leboku =

Festival in Nigeria

Leboku Leboku
- Location: Cross River State
- Country: Nigeria

Leboku (lit. 'Festival') is the annual three-week-long New Yam Festival of the Yakö people. It is celebrated in the south-south region of Cross River State, Nigeria. Leboku is peculiar to the core Yakö-speaking communities: Ugep, Idomi, Ekori, Mkpani and Nko, and the international version is celebrated in Ugep once in a year. Each of these communties has a distinct day set aside for the celebration. These are; Lemomor boku, Lelomi boku, Lekoli boku, Lekpanikpani boku and Lekakaa boku. The festival honors the earth goddess and the ancestral spirits of the land in Ugep. The three-week festival is the culmination of many events: the beginning of the yam harvest, a time to appease the gods and ancestors, a public parade of engaged maidens, a commemoration of events that led to the migration from the Yakurr ancestral home to the present site, and a period of holiday in the Yakurr traditional calendar (mid-August through mid-September). The Yakurr calendar runs from August to July.

During Leboku, people keep away from intense farming activities and exchange visits with their families. Leboku is also meant to usher in peace, good health and prosperity.

== Celebrations ==
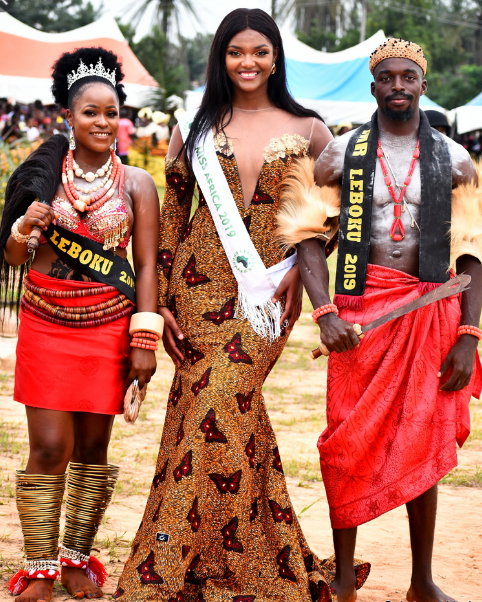
Miss and Mister Leboku at Ugep Festival, Yakurr, Cross River State, 2019

The three-week celebration starts with the Mblemi. On this day, the harvest of new yams is officially flagged off. Women from different farm-roads and groups don beautiful attire and parade through town with their harvests.

On the second day, Janenboku (lit. 'women’s festival day'), gifts are given to women by their loved ones and friends. Some traditional dances also take place. That night, two events are held: traditional drumming and dancing to the rhythm of the Ekoi drums to usher in the Ledemboku, and the modern-day Miss Leboku Beauty Pageant, which held in one of the hotels in town.

Day three, Ledemboku (lit. 'men’s festival day'), involves exchange of gifts to males, performance by the male Ekoi dancers, a parade of the Obol Lopon and his Bi-Inah (council of chiefs), dance parade by leg-bangle-wearing Leboku maidens to the rhythm of the Ekoi drums, and a display by the Etangala masquerade, whose only outing yearlong is on this day. It should also be noted that the all-embracing Etangala group have as its head, a non-Ugep, Chief Ig Ekpenyong, the Obol Etangala I of Ugep is an Efik man.

After a day of rest, which affords the Leboku maidens opportunities to cultivate new friends, known as Nkokeboi, there is Leteboku. The Leteboku is a performance poetry contest among Leboku maidens from each of the traditional Ugep wards. The songs danced to, and the rhythm produced by the leg-bangles worn by the maidens is a delight to watch.

Two days after the Leteboku, which are normally observed as rest days, is the Yekpi. It is a day when boys and Leboku maidens parade the town in a ceremony believed to usher in peace and prosperity. The Yeponfawa follows the Yekpi. This is a ceremony reserved only for initiates of the Libini group, to declare the first phase of the Leboku over. Although this takes place during the night, it is also a day non-initiates stay awake to listen to the songs.

After the Yeponfawa, young boys and girls participate in a one-week music and festival through their dance ensembles known as Egbendum (for boys) and Oka (for girls). Every neighbourhood has its own group, which is directed by an adult, who also teaches them songs and dance steps.

The Leboku comes to an end with the exit of the Egbendum and Oka sessions. Children are normally hosted to a feast of yam porridge and palm wine. The yams and palm wine are collected from parents, relatives and farmers in farm-roads located in the children's neighbourhood.

== See also ==
- Festivals in Nigeria
