= Mbembe language =

Cross River language spoken in Nigeria

Mbembe
- Native to: Nigeria
- Native speakers: (100,000 cited 1982)
- Language family: Niger–Congo?: Atlantic–Congo languages; Benue–Congo languages; Cross River; Upper Cross; Central; East–West; Mbembe

Language codes
- ISO 639-3: mfn – inclusive code Individual code: oda – Odut village
- Glottolog: cros1244
- ELP: Odut

Mbembe is a Cross River language of Nigeria. Odut, a divergent variety spoken in a village far South of the rest of Mbembe, had 20 speakers in 1980 and may be extinct.

== Geographic distribution ==
Mbembe is spoken in the vicinity of Obubra, Cross River State. Neighbouring languages are Yakö, Legbo, and Yigha to the west; and Kele, Kajuk, Nnam, Nselle, Nta, Iyala, and Futop to the north and east. Mbembe is spoken by four clans: Adun, Osopong, Okom, and Ofombonga.

== Phonology ==
Mbembe has a simple syllable structure, with common patterns being V, CV, CVC, and CVCV. Consonant clusters consist of a nasal preceding a consonant, where the nasal is homorganic.

=== Consonants ===
Mbembe consonants
		Bilabial	Labio- dental	Alveolar	Palatal	Velar	Labio- velar
Nasal	plain	m		n	ɲ	ŋ	
Nasal	fortis	mː		nː			
Plosive/ Affricate	voiceless	p		t	t͡ʃ	k	k͡p
Plosive/ Affricate	voiced	b		d	d͡ʒ	ɡ	ɡ͡b
Plosive/ Affricate	fortis			tː		kː	k͡pː
Fricative	voiceless	ɸ	f	s			
Fricative	voiced	β	v				
Fricative	fortis		fː	sː			
Tap				ɾ			
Approximant				l	j		w

Consonants occur in two sets, C_{1} and C_{2}. C_{1} appears in the initial of a syllable and encompasses all 30 consonants in Mbembe, while C_{2} appears as the second consonant of a syllable and has six consonants.

Consonant set 2
	Bilabial	Alveolar	Velar
Nasal	m	n	ŋ
Non-nasal	P	T	K

C_{2} consonants P, T, and K display several allophonic realisations. Phrase-finally, they are pronounced as unreleased stops, but when immediately followed by a vowel they are pronounced as [β], [ɾ], and [k], respectively. When C_{1} is a nasal consonant, C_{2} must also be a nasal consonant.

=== Vowels ===
Mbembe has seven distinct vowel qualities. Four vowels are distinguished by length.

	Front	Central	Back
High	i	(ɨ)	u
Near-high	(ɪ)		(ʊ)
High-mid	e eː		o oː
Low-mid	ɛ		ɔ ɔː
Low		a aː	

Phoneme/Sound	Allophones	Occurrence
/i/ [i]	[ɨ]	in closed syllables except when following /j/ or palatalized consonants
/i/ [i]	[ɪ]	in closed syllables when following /j/ or palatalized consonants
/i/ [i]	[i]	elsewhere
/u/ [u]	[u̟]	in closed syllables except when following /w/ or labialized consonants
/u/ [u]	[ʊ]	in extended syllable-pieces except when following /w/ or labialized consonants
/u/ [u]	[u]	elsewhere

=== Tone ===
Tone in Mbembe serve both lexical and grammatical functions. It has two primary towns: high and low. Mbembe tones exhibit a phenomenon of "downdrift". When a sequence of high tones are interrupted by a low tone, the following high tones are slightly lower in pitch.

he-has machetes all

However, lowering may also occur unpredictably without an interrupting low tone:

he-has cutting-grass all
