= Yakö people =

Ethnic group in Niger Delta, Nigeria

Yakö
Lokạạ
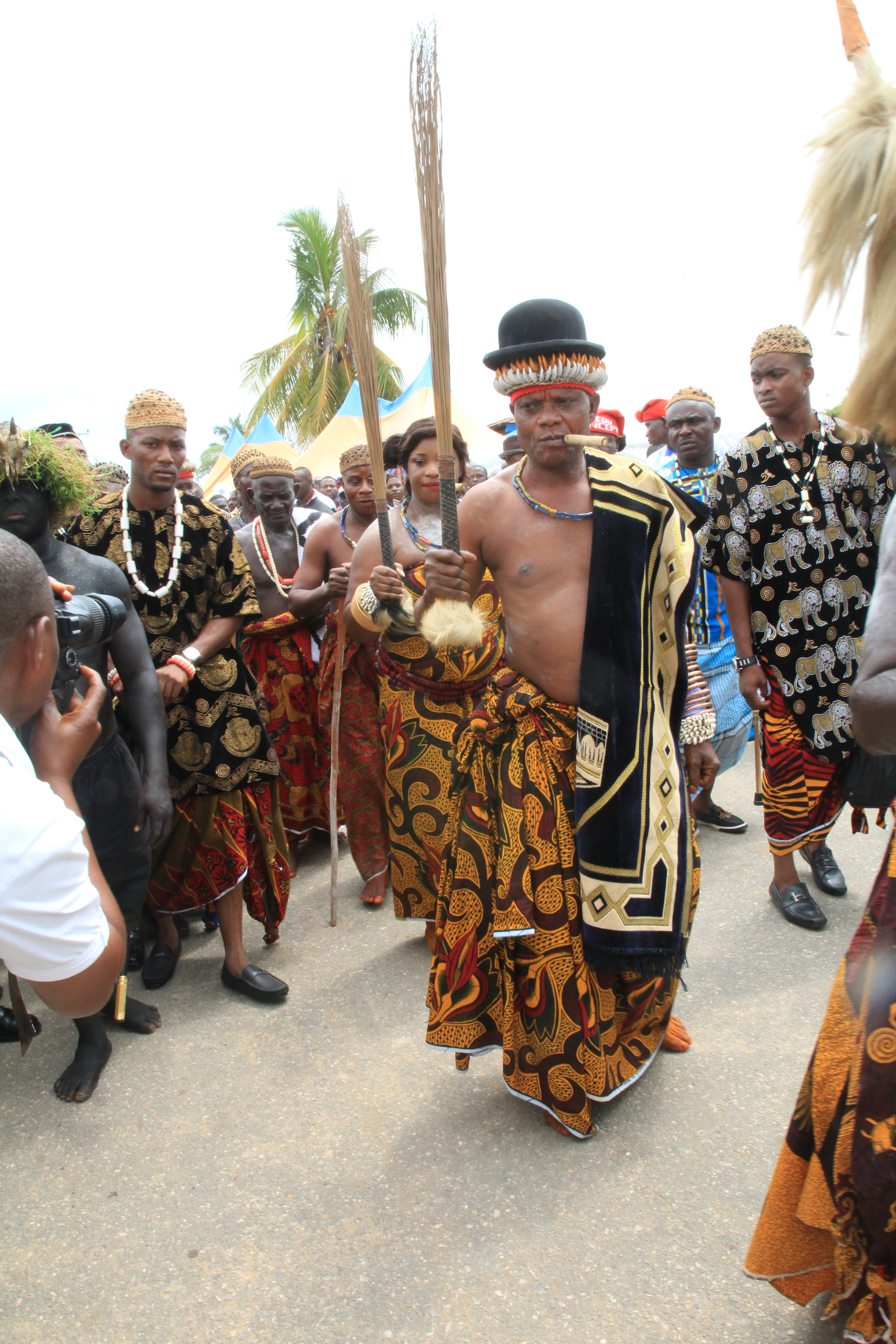
- Ceremony of the coronation and presentation of the new Obol Lopon of Ugep

Total population
- 120,000 (1989, est.)

Regions with significant populations
- Yakurr Local Government (Nigeria)

Languages
- Yakö

Religion
- Christianity

Related ethnic groups
- Bahumono, Efik and Igbo

The Yakurr (also Yakö and Yakạạ) live in five compact towns in Cross River State (Obono 2001, p. 3), Nigeria. They were formally known as Umor, Ekoli, Ilomi, Nkoibolokom and Yakurr be Ibe. Due to linguistic problems encountered by the early European visitors, the settlements have come to be known by their mispronounced versions – Ugep, Ekori, Idomi, Nko and Mkpani (Okoi-Uyouyo 2002). In the latter, it is a product of yakpanikpani (a Lokạạ word for "tricks"), a name, which Enang (1980) says was given to them by the Ugep people after being tricked in a conflict (Yakurr News).

== Territory ==
Yakurr people are predominantly found in territories that lies between latitudes 50 401 and 60 101 north of the equator and longitudes 80 21 and 60 101 east of the Greenwich Meridian and 120 km (75 mi) northwest of Calabar, the capital of Cross River State. They are found in the present-day Yakurr Local Government Area and constitute the largest ethnic group in the state. They share their northern and eastern boundaries with the Assiga, Nyima and Agoi Clans of the Yakurr Local Government Area, the southern boundary with the Biase Local Government Area and their western boundary with the Abi Local Government Area.

== Language ==
The Yakurr are an ethnic group from the Cross River region of southeastern Nigeria. They speak Lokạạ, also known as Luko, an Upper Cross River language within the larger Niger–Congo language family.

Lokạạ is one of the major languages spoken in Cross River State. It has a similar number of speakers to Efik, a widely used regional language in southeastern Nigeria. According to Ethnologue, about 120,000 people spoke Lokạạ in 1989.

== Social organization ==
The Yakö live in compact villages divided into wards made up of several patrilineal clans. Rights to farmland, house sites, and cooperative labour are organized through descent traced through the male line. Men belonging to the same clan often live together and work cooperatively in farming. Clan heads settle disputes, conduct rituals, and represent the clan in external relations.

The Yakö also recognize matrilineal descent. Movable wealth, including livestock and currency, is inherited through the maternal line. Maternal relatives are responsible for certain debts, take part in compensation payments for injuries, and participate in rituals connected to a fertility spirit.

== History ==
The Yakurr trace their origins to "Akpa", which oral traditions describe as their ancestral homeland. According to these traditions, the Yakurr began leaving Akpa around AD 1617 after a dispute with neighbouring groups over a burial custom led to war and forced them from their homeland.

Ubi describes Yakurr migration as taking place over several generations between the seventeenth and eighteenth centuries. Around AD 1660, Yakurr migrants established settlements at Idomi and Ugep in what is now Cross River State. Later migrations between 1677 and 1707 are associated with the founding of Ekori and Nko, while another migration wave between 1707 and 1737 is linked to the establishment of Mkpani.

Population growth, competition for farmland, and conflicts between communities contributed to the establishment of new Yakurr settlements. Patrilocal marriage patterns and a strongly patriarchal family structure also made it easier for clans to relocate. These migrations contributed to similarities in clan names across Yakurr communities.

== Notable people ==
- Okoi Arikpo, Longest-serving Foreign Minister of the Federal Republic of Nigeria, & Pioneer Secretary, National Universities Commission.
- Clement Ebri, former Governor of Cross River State.
- Eteng Okoi-Obuli, Minister of Agriculture, Second Republic.
- Ibok-Ete Ekwe Ibas, Vice Admiral, and Former Chief of Naval Staff
- Usani Uguru Usani, Former Minister of Niger Delta.
- Etowa Eyong Arikpo, Former Attorney General, and Chief Justice of Cross River State
- Okoi Ikpi Itam, Former Chief Justice of Cross River State.
- Eka Ikpi Braide, Pioneer Vice-Chancellor, Cross River University of Science & Technology, and Federal University of Lafia, Nassarawa
- Efa Iwara, Nigerian actor and rapper
