= Benedict Iserom Ita =

Nigerian chemist

Professor Benedict Iserom Ita
- Born: 10 April 1967 (age 59); Aningeje, Akamkpa, Cross River State, Nigeria
- Occupation: Academic
- Employer: Arthur Jarvis University
- Known for: Corrosion/Electrochemistry, Nanomaterials and Applications
- Title: Former Vice-Chancellor of Arthur Jarvis University
- Term: 2 October 2023–present
- Predecessor: Ani Nkang
- Successor: Incumbent

Academic background
- Education: B.Sc., M.Sc., Ph.D. in Physical Chemistry
- Alma mater: University of Calabar

Benedict Iserom Ita (born 10 April 1967) is a Nigerian academic who had served as the vice-chancellor of Arthur Jarvis University since 2023.

Born on 10 April 1967 in Aningeje, Akamkpa, Cross River State, Ita had his primary education at Presbyterian Primary School in Akim Qua Town, Calabar where he obtained a First School Leaving Certificate in 1979 and proceeded to Immaculate Conception Seninary in Mfamosing where he obtained his General Certificate of Education (GCE) in 1984. Ita proceeded to the University of Calabar where he earned a bachelor's degree in 1989, master's degree in 1994 and PhD in 2000 on Physical Chemistry.

Ita is a Professor of Physical and Theoretical Chemistry and became the vice chancellor of Arthur Jarvis University in 2023.
