= Egbona Alex Egbona =

Nigerian politician

Member of the House of Representatives
- Constituency: Yakurr/Abi Federal Constituency

Personal details
- Born: Cross River State, Nigeria
- Party: All Progressives Congress
- Occupation: Politician

Egbona Alex Egbona is a Nigerian politician currently serving as the Federal Representative for the Yakurr/Abi constituency of Cross River State in the 10th National Assembly.
