= Bakpinka language =

Endangered Cross River language of Nigeria

Bakpinka
- Iyongiyong
- Native to: Nigeria
- Region: Cross River State
- Native speakers: 4,000 (2006)
- Language family: Niger–Congo?: Atlantic–Congo; Benue–Congo; Cross River; Upper Cross; Agoi; Bakpinka

Language codes
- ISO 639-3: bbs
- Glottolog: bakp1238
- ELP: Bakpinka

Bakpinka, or Iyongiyong (a name shared with Kiong), is an endangered Upper Cross River language of Nigeria.
