= Upper Cross River languages =

Cross River language branch of Nigeria

Upper Cross River
- Upper Cross
- Geographic distribution: SE Nigeria
- Linguistic classification: Niger–Congo?: Atlantic–Congo; Benue–Congo; Cross River; Upper Cross River
- Subdivisions: Central; Akpet; Agoi–Doko–Iyoniyong; Kiong–Korop

Language codes
- Glottolog: uppe1418

The Upper Cross River languages form a branch of the Cross River languages of Cross River State, Nigeria. The most populous languages are Lokö and Mbembe, with 100,000 speakers.

== Languages ==
The internal structure per Cornell (1994), reproduced in Williamson and Blench (2000), is as follows:

- Upper Cross
  - Central
    - North–South
      - Koring–Kukele
        - Oring (Koring)
        - Kele (Kukele), Zekwe (Uzekwe)
      - Ubaghara–Kohumono
        - Kohumono: Humono (Kohumono), Gwune (Agwagwune), Umon
        - Ubaghara
    - East–West
      - Ikom
      - Loko: Lokaa, Lubila, Nkukoli
      - Mbembe–Legbo
        - Mbembe
        - Legbo: Legbo (Gbo), Nyima (Lenyima), Yigha (Leyigha)
  - Akpet: Ukpet-Ehom
  - Agoi, Doko (Uyanga), Iyongiyong (Bakpinka)
  - Kiong–Kororb: Kiong (Kayon), Dorop (Korop)

== Names and locations ==
Below is a list of language names, populations, and locations from Blench (2019).

	Language	Branch	Cluster	Dialects	Alternate spellings	Own name for language	Endonym(s)	Other names (location-based)	Other names for language	Exonym(s)	Speakers	Location(s)
Agọi				Agoi		WaGọi	Ibami	Ro Bambami	Wa Bambami	3,650 (1953); estimated 12,000 (Faraclas 1989)	Cross River State, Obubra LGA, Agoi–Ekpo, Ekom–Agoi, Agoi–Ibami and Itu–Agoi towns	
Kiọng								Akoiyang, Äkäyöñ, Okoyong, Okonyong		Spoken only by old people, younger generation speak Efik	Cross River State, Odukpani and Akamkpa LGAs	
Kọrọp					Durop, Kurop		Kòṛ óp̣		Ododop	12,500 total (1982 SIL)	Cross River State, Odukpani and Akamkpa LGAs; and in Cameroon	
Legbo	East–West			Gbo	Legbo	Agbo	Itigidi	Igbo Imaban		18,500 (1963); 30,000 (1973 SIL)	Cross River State, Obubra LGA; Abia State, Afikpo LGA	
Lenyima	East–West					Anyima			Inyima		Cross River State, Obubra LGA	
Leyigha	East–West					Ayiga, Yigha		Asiga		3,150 (1953)	Cross River State, Obubra LGA	
Lokәә	East–West		Ugep, Nkpam	Lokә, Lokö		Yakạ, Yakә, Yakurr, Yakö	Ugep			38,200 (1953); 100,000 (1973 SIL)	Cross River State, Obubra LGA	
Lubila	East–West					Kabila		Ojor, Kabila, Kaibre, Kabire			Cross River State, Akamkpa LGA, at Ojo Nkomba, and Ojo Akangba	
Mbembe	East–West		Adun, Okom (Eghom) (sub–dialects: Apiapum, Ohana, Onyen), Osopong (Ezopong), Ofombonga (Ewumbonga), Ofonokpan, Okorogbana, Ekama (Akam) in Ikom LGA, Oferikpe in Abakaliki LGA					Okam, Oderiga, Wakande, Ifunubwa, Ekokoma, Ofunobwan (per Thomas)		35,600 (1953); 100,000 (1982 UBS)	Cross River State, Obubra and Ikom LGAs; Anambra State, Abakaliki LGA	
Nkukoli	East–West			Nkokolle	Lokukoli		Ekuri			17,831 (1926 Talbot); 10,000 (1973 SIL)	Cross River State, Ikom, Obubra and Akamkpa LGAs, Iko Ekperem Development Area	
Olulumọ–Ikọm cluster	East–West	Olulumọ–Ikọm					Òkúní			9,250 (1953)	Cross River State, Ikom LGA	
Olulumọ	East–West	Olulumọ–Ikọm		Òlúlùmọ						1,730 (1953); 5,000 (Faraclas 1989)		
Ikọm	East–West	Olulumọ–Ikọm								7,520 (1953); 25,000 (Faraclas 1989)		
Bakpinka	East–West					Iyongiyong, Iyoniyong	Uwet		Begbungba		Cross River State, Akamkpa LGA	
Doko–Uyanga	East–West				Dọsanga	Basanga	Iko			Several towns	Cross River State, Akamkpa LGA	
Ukpet–Ehom cluster	East–West	Ukpet–Ehom		Akpet–Ehom							Cross River State, Akamkpa LGA	
Ukpet	East–West	Ukpet–Ehom			Akpet							
Ehom	East–West	Ukpet–Ehom			Ubeteng	Ebeteng						
Kukele	North–South		4 dialects in north, 3 in south, Ugbala, Mtezi and Mtezi–Iteeji in Anambra State, Abakaliki LGA	Ukele, Ukelle	Kukele	Bakele				31,700 (1953); 40,000 (1980 UBS)	Cross River State, Ogoja LGA; Anambra State, Abakaliki LGA; Benue State, Okpokwu and Oju LGAs; and in Cameroon	
Ubaghara cluster	North–South	Ubaghara								30,000 (1985 UBS)	Cross River State, Akamkpa LGA	
Biakpan	North–South	Ubaghara									Ubaghara Development Area	
Ikun	North–South	Ubaghara									Ubaghara Development Area	
Etono	North–South	Ubaghara									Ubaghara Development Area	
Ugbem	North–South	Ubaghara									Egup–Ita Development Area	
Utuma	North–South	Ubaghara									Umon Development Area	
Kohumono	North–South	Kohumono			KoHumono	BaHumono, sg. Òhúmónò	Ediba (under Ekurĩ (Thomas)	Ekumuru, Ìkúmúrú, Ìkúmóró (Igbo name); Àtàm (Efik name)		11,870 (1952)	Cross River State, Abi and Obubra LGA	
KOIN (Kalaḅarị–Okrika–Ịḅanị–Nkọrọ)	North–South	Kohumono	Kalaḅarị, Kịrịkẹ (Okrika), Ịḅanị dialects and the isolated lect Nkọrọ Kokura (Bura Kokura), belonging to the Tera cluster								Rivers State, Asari–Toru, Degema, Bonny, Okrika, and Port Harcourt LGAs	
Oring cluster	North–South	Oring		Orri	Koring					at least 25,000 (1952 RGA); 75,000 (Faraclas 1989)	Benue State, Okpokwu LGA; Anambra State, Ishielu LGA	
Ufia	North–South	Oring					Utonkon			12,300 (1952 RGA)	Benue State, Okpokwu LGA	
Ufiom	North–South	Oring		Effium						3,000 (1952 RGA)	Benue State, Okpokwu LGA; Anambra State, Ishielu LGA	
Okpoto	North–South	Oring								6,350 (1952 RGA)	Anambra State, Ishielu LGA	
Umon	North–South					Amon				25 villages	Cross River State, Akamkpa LGA	
Uzekwe	North–South			Ezekwe						5,000 (1973 SIL)	Cross River State, Ogoja LGA	
Agwagwune cluster	North–South	Agwagwune		Agwa–Gwunɛ						20,000 (SIL)	Cross River State, Akamkpa LGA	
Agwagwune	North–South	Agwagwune			Gwune	Agwagwune	Akunakuna (not recommended), Akurakura (of Koelle)				Cross River State, Akamkpa LGA, Egup–Ipa Development Area	
Erei	North–South	Agwagwune				Ezei		Enna			Cross River State, Akamkpa LGA, Erei Development Area	
Abini	North–South	Agwagwune		Bini, Abiri	Obini						Cross River State, Akamkpa LGA, Egup–Ipa Development Area	
Adim	North–South	Agwagwune		Arәm, Dim	Odim			Orum			Cross River State, Akamkpa LGA, Egup–Ipa Development Area	
Abayongo	North–South	Agwagwune		Bayono, Bayino							Cross River State, Akamkpa LGA, Egup–Ipa Development Area	
Etono II	North–South	Agwagwune				Etuno					Cross River State, Akamkpa LGA, Ubaghara Development Area	

== Reconstruction ==
A reconstruction of Proto-Upper Cross River has been proposed by Gerrit Dimmendaal (1978).

== See also ==
- List of Proto-Upper Cross River reconstructions (Wiktionary)
