= Nko, Cross River State =

Village in Cross River State, Nigeria

Nko
- Village
- Interactive map of Nko
- Country: Nigeria
- State: Cross River
- Local Government Area: Yakurr Local Government

Nko is a village in Yakurr Local Government of Cross River State, Nigeria. It is the shortened form of Nkoibolokom. It is one of the five Lokàà-speaking settlements that together with Agoi-Ibami, Agoi-Ekpo, Inyima, Ekpeti, and Assiga make up what is known as Yakurr. The other Lokàà-speaking towns are Idomi, Ugep, Ekori, and Mkpani. They are known for their hospitality and have throughout the years produced notable people who have served the country in various capacities.

In June 2024, its community border fights over a piece of land with Onyadama community in Obubra Local Government Area in Cross River state was settled, thus bringing peace to the two communities after long years of inter community battle that had claimed loss of lives, properties and injuries to some.
