= Agoi language =

Cross River language spoken in Nigeria

Agoi
- Ibami
- Native to: Nigeria
- Region: Cross River State
- Native speakers: (12,000 cited 1989)
- Language family: Niger–Congo?: Atlantic–Congo; Benue–Congo; Cross River; Upper Cross; Agoi languages; Agoi

Language codes
- ISO 639-3: ibm
- Glottolog: agoi1246

Agoi, Robambami, or Ibami, is an Upper Cross River language spoken in Cross River State of Nigeria.

== Phonology ==
Yul-Ifode lists the following vowel phonemes:

Agoi vowels
	Front	Near-front	Central	Near-back	Back
Close	i i:				u u:
Close-mid	e e:	ɪ		ʊ	o o:
Mid			ə		
Open-mid	ɛ ɛː				ɔ ɔ:
Open	a a:				

However, she notes that the use of phonemes /ɪ/ and /ʊ/ is in decline, as they are often in free variation with /i/ and /u/.
