= Ubaghara language =

Cross River language spoken in Nigeria

Ubaghara
- Native to: Nigeria
- Region: Cross River State
- Native speakers: (30,000 cited 1985)
- Language family: Niger–Congo?: Atlantic–Congo; Benue–Congo; Cross River; Upper Cross; Central; North–South; Ubaghara–Kohumono; Ubaghara

Language codes
- ISO 639-3: byc
- Glottolog: ubag1245

Ubaghara is an Upper Cross River language spoken by the Ubaghara people, an Efik subgroup in Biase local government area of Cross River State. Ubaghara language is closely related to Efik and Qua (Ejagham) although classed as an Upper Cross River Language.

Ubaghara clan includes Biakpan, Ikun, Ugbem, Etono central, Etono II, and Utuma, altogether known as the Biakpan Eburutu.

The main village of Ubaghara is Biakpan , which itself originates from the Obutong clan section during the historic Efik people migration from Itu which spread across the lower cross river (oyono, oyomo) areas from Biase west to Odukpani, Calabar, Akpabuyo and Bakassi.

== Dialects ==
Ubaghara dialects according to Blench (2019):

- Biakpan
- Ikun
- Etono
- Ugbem
- Utuma
