= Paradise Music Festival and Awards =

Music Festival and Awards

- Awarded for: Outstanding talents in the entertainment industry in South South Nigeria
- Country: Nigeria
- Presented by: Effiom Trombone
- First award: 2012

Paradise Music Festival and Awards (first known as Paradise Music Awards) was established in 2012 and is endorsed by the Cross River State Government. The award is designed to celebrate outstanding talents in the entertainment industry across South South Nigeria.It is listed on the events calendar of the annual Calabar Carnival. The award is in two segments; the special merit award category which is given to veteran musicians and the competitive category which is done through online voting.

Some notable recipients of the Paradise Music Festival and awards include the former Governor of Cross River State Ben Ayade, Iyanya, Sunny Neji, Mista Xto and many others.

== History ==
Paradise Music Festival and Awards was first launched in 2012 at Joranny hotels as Paradise Music Awards by veteran Efik highlife musician Effiom Trombone who is widely known in Cross River state for his songs ‘Ikwo Calabar’ and ‘eyen calabar’. He launched this award ceremony in 2012 and continued when he was appointed the Special Assistant to Governor Ben Ayade on Entertainment in 2019 and it has been endorsed by the Cross River State government and added to the events calendar of the annual Calabar Carnival.

In 2016 at the launch of the third edition, it was renamed Paradise music festival and awards to better reflect it's expanded scope and celebrate talents across South South, Nigeria

== Categories ==
=== Lifetime achievement award ===
In this category, Individuals who have made a distinction and contributed to the success and development of the entertainment industry are being honored.

=== Special merit award Categories ===
- NEW DISCOVERY OF THE YEAR
- SONG OF THE YEAR
- ALBUM OF THE YEAR
- FEMALE ARTIST OF THE YEAR
- RAP/HIP HOP ARTISTE OF THE YEAR
- GOSPEL ARTISTE OF THE YEAR
- DJ OF THE YEAR
- SONG WRITER OF THE YEAR
- OAP OF THE YEAR
- MUSIC PRODUCER OF THE YEAR
- MUSIC VIDEO OF THE YEAR
- RAGGAE DANCEHALL ARTISTE OF THE YEAR
- MUSIC BLOGGER OF THE YEAR
