= Gwune language =

Upper Cross River language spoken in Nigeria

Gwune
- Agwagwune
- Native to: Nigeria
- Region: Cross River State
- Native speakers: (20,000 cited 1973)
- Language family: Niger–Congo?: Atlantic–Congo; Benue–Congo; Cross River; Upper Cross; Central; North–South; Ubaghara–Kohumono; Gwune

Language codes
- ISO 639-3: yay
- Glottolog: agwa1247

The Gwune language, also known as Agwagwune, is an Upper Cross River language of Nigeria spoken by the Agwagwune people. It is a dialect cluster named after its prestige variety; others are Abayongo, Abini, Dim (Adim), Orum, Erei, Etono.
