= Ikom language =

Cross River language spoken in Nigeria

Ikom
- Native to: Nigeria
- Region: Cross River State
- Native speakers: (30,000 cited 1989)
- Language family: Niger–Congo?: Atlantic–Congo; Benue–Congo; Cross River; Upper Cross; Central; East–West; Ikom
- Dialects: Ikom; Lulumo (Olulumo); Okuni

Language codes
- ISO 639-3: iko
- Glottolog: olul1245

Ikom is an Upper Cross River language of Nigeria. There are three varieties, Okuni, Lulumo (Olulumo) and Ikom. Ikom is spoken by 80%. The language can also be known by a combination of the names of two or three varieties, including Lulumo-Ikom (Olulumo-Ikom).
