= Kiong language =

Endangered Cross River language of Nigeria

Kiong
- Kayon
- Akoiyang
- Native to: Nigeria
- Region: Cross River State
- Ethnicity: 570 Akayon (no date)
- Native speakers: 8 (2010)
- Language family: Niger–Congo?: Atlantic–Congo; Benue–Congo; Cross River; Upper Cross; Kiong–Korop; Kiong

Language codes
- ISO 639-3: kkm
- Glottolog: kion1242
- ELP: Kiong

Kiong, or Kayon, is a nearly extinct Upper Cross River language of Nigeria. Okoyong speakers of the Kiong language are geographically located in the Odukpani, Akamkpa and Biase local government areas of Cross River State. This language was documented in 1990s, and it have 25 speakers counted in 1998. But in 2010, only 8 elders were able to speak Kiong (all in the 70s), leaving the language critically endangered/nearly extinct.

== Phonology ==
Consonants
	Labial	Alveolar	Palatal	Velar	Labiovelar
Plosive	b	t d		k	kp
Fricative	f	s		x	
Nasal	m	n	ɲ	ŋ	
Approximant	w	r	j		

- /b/ is unvoiced [p] word-finally.
- /x/ can be heard as [h~ʁ].
- /ŋ/ is labialized [ŋʷ] syllable-initially.

Vowels
	Front	Central	Back
High	i iː		u uː
Mid-high	e eː		o oː
Mid-low			ɔ ɔː
Low		a aː	

Kiong also has four tones; high, low, rising, and falling.
