= Doko language =

Doko may be:

- Doko language (Nigeria)
- Doko language (Democratic Republic of Congo)
