= Zekwe language =

Upper Cross River language of Nigeria

Zekwe
- Uzekwe
- Native to: Nigeria
- Native speakers: (5,000 cited 1973)
- Language family: Niger–Congo?: Atlantic–Congo; Benue–Congo; Cross River; Upper Cross; Central; North–South; Koring–Kukele; Zekwe

Language codes
- ISO 639-3: eze
- Glottolog: uzek1238

The Zekwe language, Uzekwe, is an Upper Cross River language of Nigeria.
