= Nkukoli language =

Upper Cross River language of Nigeria

Nkukoli
- Ekuri
- Native to: Nigeria
- Region: Cross River State
- Native speakers: (10,000 cited 1973)
- Language family: Niger–Congo?: Atlantic–Congo; Benue–Congo; Cross River; Upper Cross; Central; East–West; Loko; Nkukoli

Language codes
- ISO 639-3: nbo
- Glottolog: nkuk1238

Nkukoli (Ekuri, Lokoli, Lokukoli) is an Upper Cross River language of Nigeria.
