= Umon language =

Upper Cross River language of Nigeria

Umon
- Native to: Nigeria
- Region: Cross River State
- Native speakers: (20,000 cited 1995)
- Language family: Niger–Congo?: Atlantic–Congo; Benue–Congo; Cross River; Upper Cross; Central; North–South; Ubaghara–Kohumono; Umon

Language codes
- ISO 639-3: umm
- Glottolog: umon1238

Umon (Amon) is an Upper Cross River language of Nigeria.
