= Lubila language =

Upper Cross River language of Nigeria

Lubila
- Kabila
- Native to: Nigeria
- Region: Cross River State
- Native speakers: (11,000 cited 2000)
- Language family: Niger–Congo?: Atlantic–Congo; Benue–Congo; Cross River; Upper Cross; Central; East–West; Loko; Lubila

Language codes
- ISO 639-3: kcc
- Glottolog: lubi1238

Lubila, or Kabila, is an Upper Cross River language of Nigeria.
