= Ababene =

- Village
- Location in Nigeria
- Coordinates: 5.9315°N 8.2979°E
- Country: Nigeria
- State: Cross River
- Local Government Area: Obubra

Ababene is a village in Obubra local government area of Cross River State, Nigeria.
