= Inyima =

Village in Cross River State, Nigeria

- Village
- Interactive map of Inyima
- Country: Nigeria
- State: Cross River
- Local Government Area: Yakurr Local Government

Inyima is a village in Yakurr Local Government of Cross River State, Nigeria.
