= Akpet language =

Upper Cross River dialects of Nigeria

Akpet
- Ukpet-Ehom
- Native to: Nigeria
- Region: Cross River State
- Native speakers: (11,000 cited 2000)
- Language family: Niger–Congo?: Atlantic–Congo; Benue–Congo; Cross River; Upper Cross; Akpet
- Dialects: Ukpet; Ehom

Language codes
- ISO 639-3: akd
- Glottolog: ukpe1249

Akpet, also known as Ukpet-Ehom or Akpet-Ehom, is a dialect cluster of the Upper Cross River languages of Nigeria. The varieties are Ukpet (Akpet) and Ehom (Ubeteng, Ebeteng).
