= Ekori =

- Village
- Location within Nigeria
- Coordinates: 5.880605°N 8.122474°E
- Country: Nigeria
- State: Cross River
- Local Government Area: Yakurr

Ekori is a community in Yakurr, Nigeria.

== Language and culture ==
The native language is Lokaa. English is the official language; other languages spoken in Ekori include pidgin English, which most West African people understand. Leboku is the New Yam festival or harvest thanksgiving often celebrated in Ekori during the month of September. Another fascinating cultural event in Ekori is popularly known as KEPU (wrestling), practised when celebrating men and women who have attained a certain age bracket. According to Daryll Forde, 1964 (Yako Studies) this community is the second largest in Yakurr Local Government Area of Cross River State, Nigeria. The people of Ekori living outside the community also contribute through Ekori Progressive Elements League (EPEL), and through age-grade associations known as (Ekoh). EPEL members are primarily women, most of whom live in Calabar, Lagos, and Abuja. The age grades, on the other hand, are composed of individuals of the same age or younger or older by at most two years.

== Religion ==
The people of Ekori are mainly Christian with about 2% of the population identifying with traditional religions. More than half of the population are subsistence farmers; they plant mainly cassava, maize, Yam and vegetables. Eighty percent of the cassava is processed into garri. They also have civil servants and Entrepreneurs. Commercial farmers mainly owners of small-holding oil palm estates can be found in the community.
