= Korop language =

Upper Cross River language of Nigeria

Korop
- Durop
- Native to: Nigeria, Cameroon
- Region: Cross River State
- Native speakers: 18,000 (2007)
- Language family: Niger–Congo?: Atlantic–Congo; Benue–Congo; Cross River; Upper Cross; Kiong–Korop; Korop

Language codes
- ISO 639-3: krp
- Glottolog: koro1304
- ELP: Korop

The Korop language, Durop – also known as Ododop or Erorop, is an Upper Cross River language of Nigeria.
