= Ugep =

Town in the Yakurr LGA, Cross River State

Ugep (Umor Otu-tu)
- Town
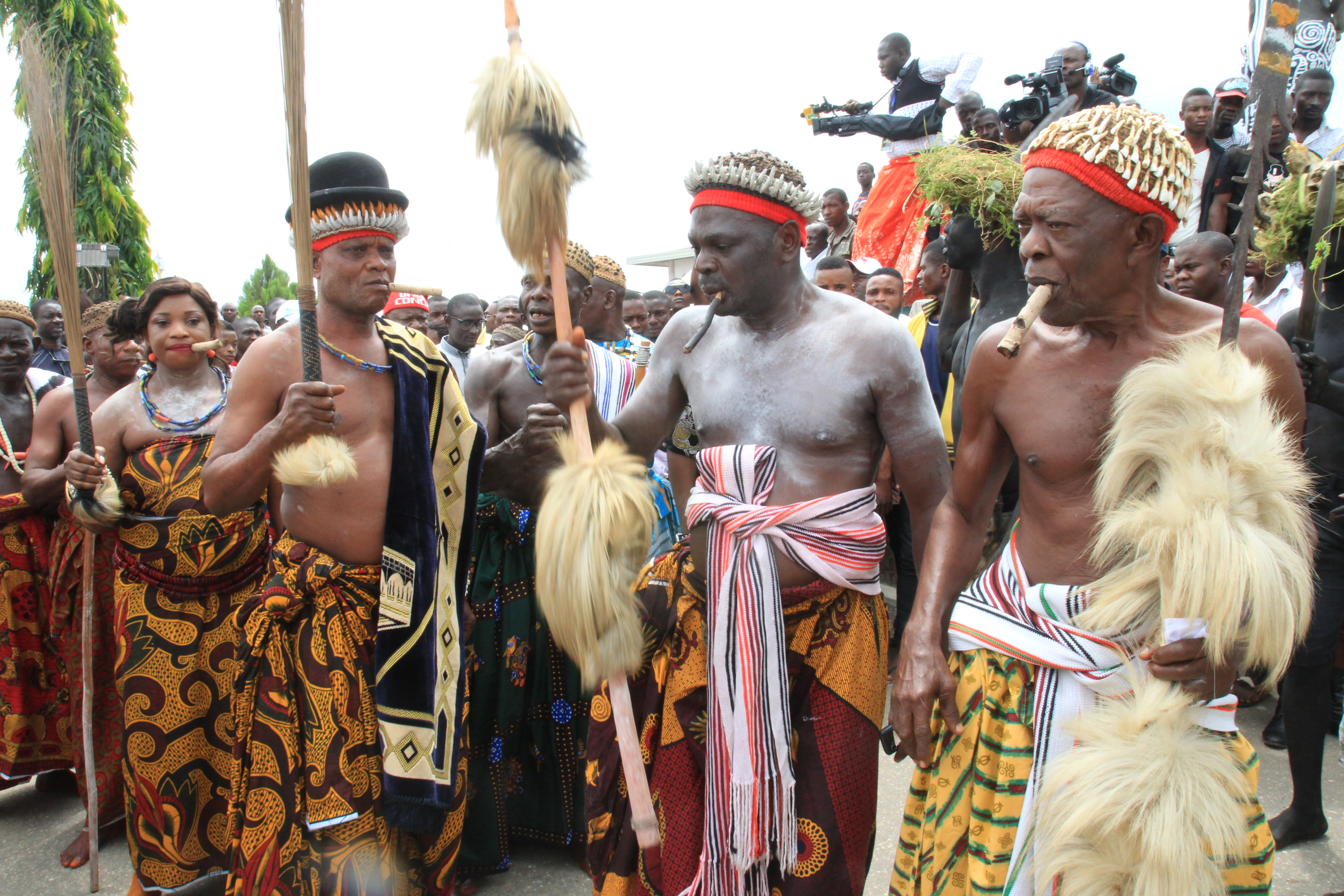
- A Line of the Royal Procession, led by the Okpebili - Prime Minister, The Onun Ekoh - Defense Minister, The Obol Lopon of Ugep (the King)
- Motto(s): Peace & Unity
- Location in Nigeria, Cross River State
- Coordinates: 5°48′N 8°05′E
- Country Nigeria: Nigeria
- State: Cross River State
- LGA: Yakurr

Government
  - Type: Direct Rule
  - Obol Lopon: Obol Ofem Ubana

Population (2018)
  - Town: 420,000
  - Urban: 280,000
- Time zone: UTC+1 (West Africa Time)
- Postal code: 543101

Ugep (also Umor) is a town in the Yakurr Local Government Area in Cross River State, southern Nigeria. The village is populated by the Yakurr people.

Lokaa is the local language.
