= Calabar Carnival =

Annual carnival in Nigeria

Coordinates: 4.9685°N 8.3408°E

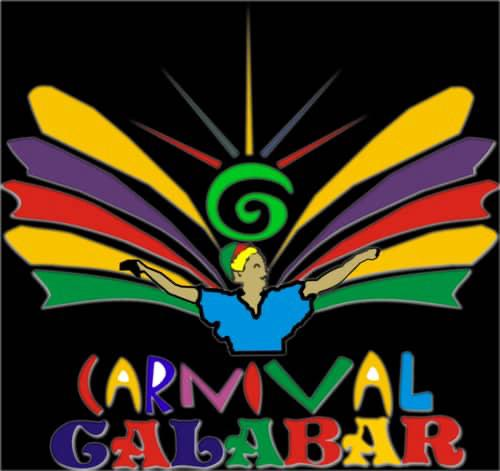
- 2016 festival
- Nickname: Africa's Biggest Street Party
- Status: Active
- Genre: Festivals
- Date: Every December
- Begins: 2004
- Frequency: Annually
- Location: Calabar
- Country: Nigeria
- Founder: Donald Duke

Calabar Carnival also known as "Carnival Calabar" is an annual carnival held in Cross River State, Nigeria. Colloquially entitled Africa's Biggest Street Party, the carnival holds every December and was declared by the then governor of Cross River State, Mr. Donald Duke as an activity to mark Christmas celebration yearly. He said his vision for creating the festival was to make Cross-River a home of tourism and hospitality in Nigeria and Africa. The quality of the festival has grown over the years making it Nigeria's biggest carnival and an internationally recognized festival. It used to be a month-long event that began on the 1st of December, until the former governor of the state, Benedict Ayade reduced it to two weeks after he was elected. During the 2017 carnival, Former governor Benedict Ayade said in his speech that the carnival is to showcase Africa as the richest continent and a blessed place where the young ones should be proud to belong. The carnival has always been entertaining and colourful as different competitions take place and huge cash prizes are won. Calabar which is also known by the name Canaan City, is a city in southern Nigeria. Calabar is the capital city of Cross River State. Calabar sits adjacent to the Calabar and Great Kwa Rivers and Falls as well as the creeks of the Cross River. According to Ojoi Ekpenyong, the managing director of the tourism bureau, the event hosted over 248,000 visitors.

== History ==
The Calabar Carnival is an old cultural event that started even before Nigerian independence. During the Nigerian civil war that lasted from 1966 - 1970, the carnival was halted for a while for security reasons, but it commenced in 1971 when the governor of South Eastern state was Brigadier General U. J. Esuene and was celebrated throughout the 80s and 90s.

By 1993 political crises that later lead to the death of M.K.O Abiola, following election results annulment by then military president, Gen. Ibrahim Babangida, as the crises engulfed the entire nation, subsequent events from the political crises lead to economic down turn, massive protest, and Commonwealth sanctions. All these slowed down the Calabar Festival celebration again.

In 2004, former governor Donald Duke of Cross River, as a way to promote tourism and improve the local economy reboosted the Calabar carnival, by bringing in participants and visitors from other African countries, international investors and the Diaspora. According to Osima-Dokubo, "the carnival aimed to include more aspects of local heritage and culture and at the same time strengthen the capacity of the locals to participate in an economically beneficial way."

== Programmes ==
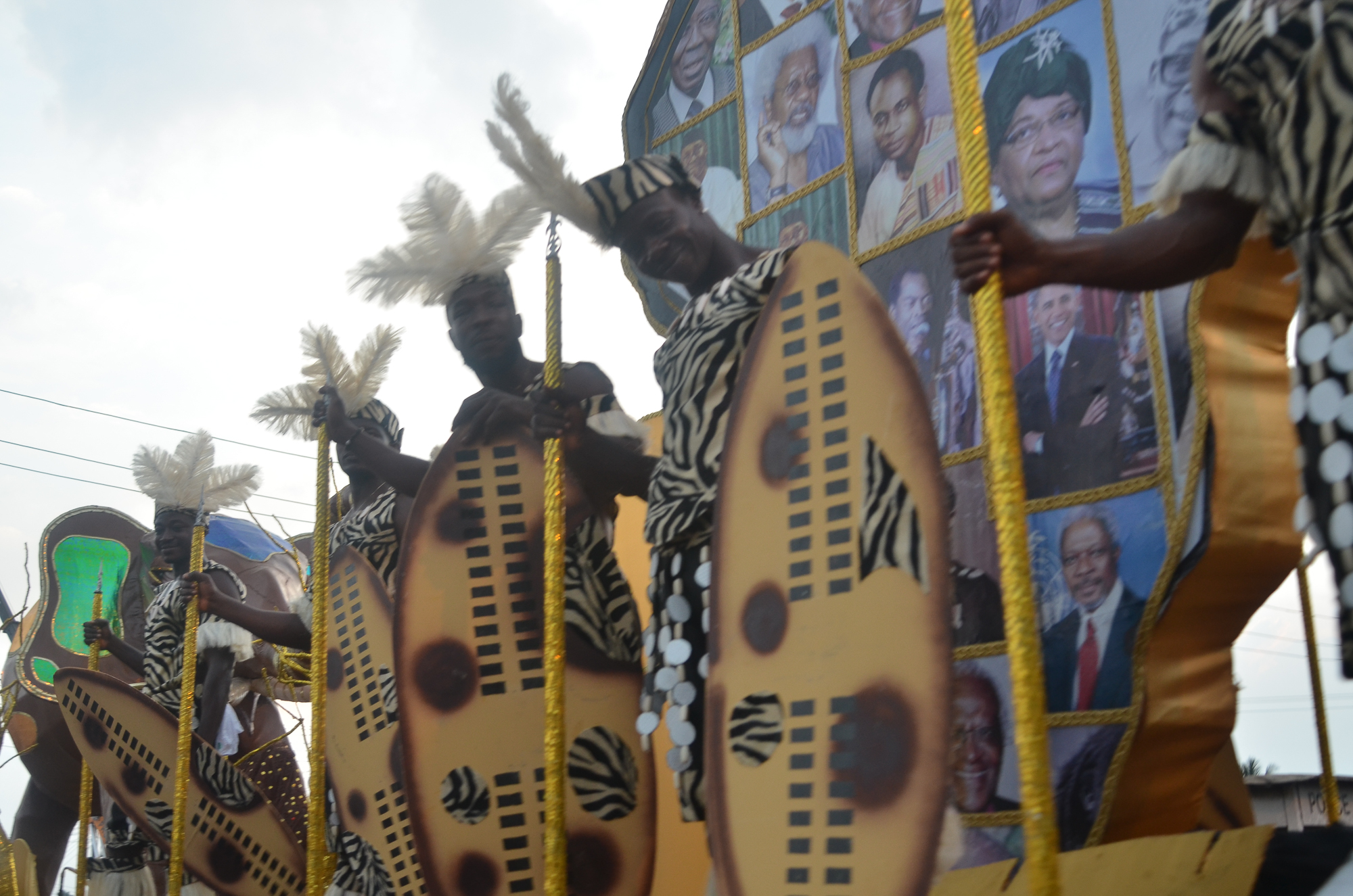
Calabar carnival

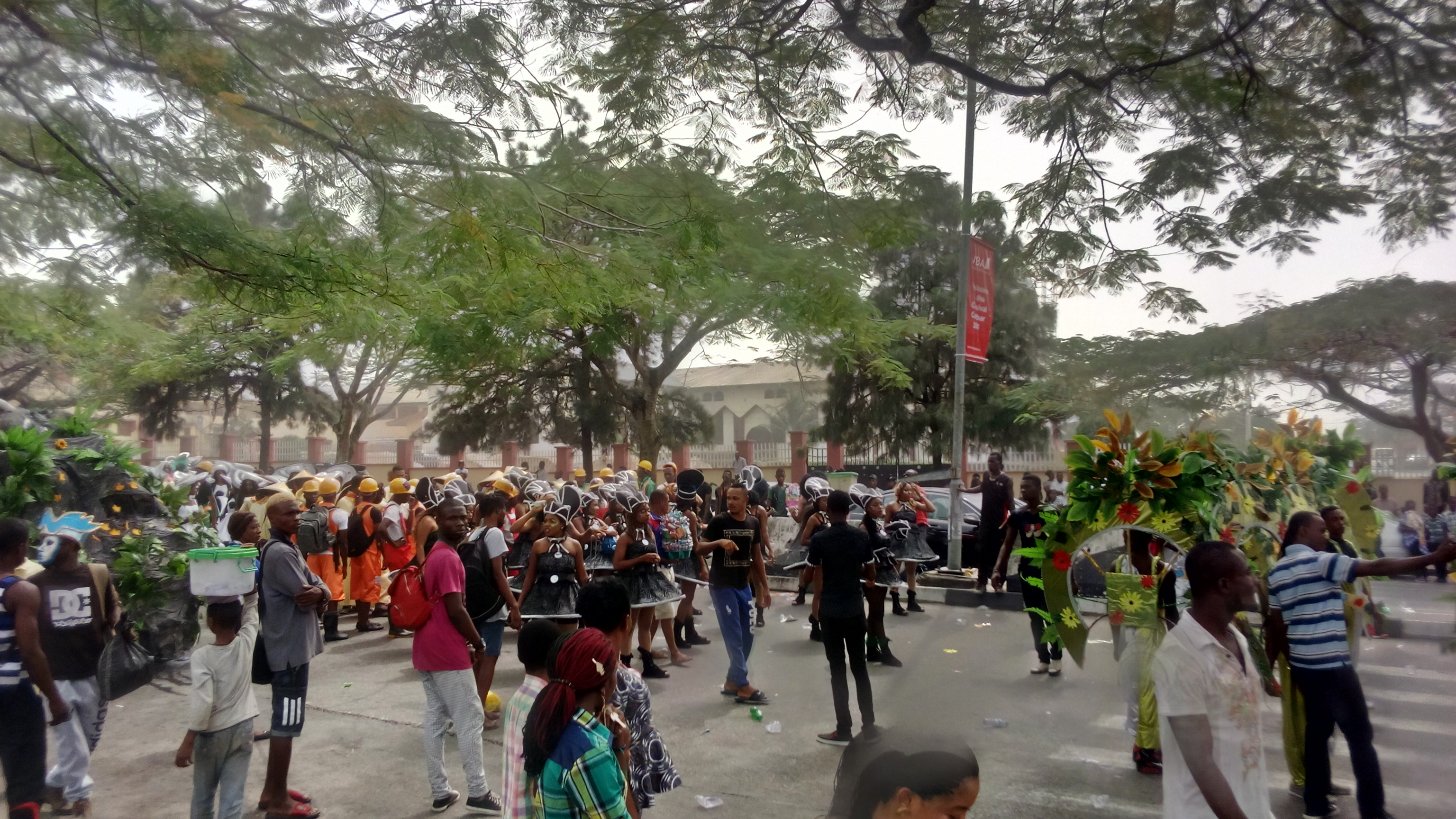
Calabar carnival Dec 2016...2

The programme is drafted each year by the committee in charge of tourism and cultural activities and new initiatives are introduced with different topics chosen to drive the carnival. In December 2009, the Carnival Committee organized "Carnival Cup 2009", a football competition among the five competing carnival bands - Seagull, Passion 4, Masta Blasta, Bayside and Freedom. These bands are distinguished by their colors; The Seagull is the Red band and is known as the most stylish and coordinated band, Passion 4 is the Green band and is known as the most successful band, Masta Blasta is the orange and largest band, Bayside is the Blue band, and Freedom is the Yellow band. The Festival also includes music performance from both local and international artists, the annual Calabar Carnival, Boat regatta, Fashion shows (introduced in 2016), Beauty pageant (Miss Africa introduced in 2016) Christmas Village, traditional dances and the annual Ekpe Festival that brings in thousands of tourists.)

Other activities that make up this carnival include essay writing competitions, which involves both secondary school and tertiary students. These competitions are designed to promote reading culture among the youths of the State and inculcate in them the carnival culture. In 2017 The Paradise Music Festival and Awards was added to the Calabar carnival calendar

== Paradise ==
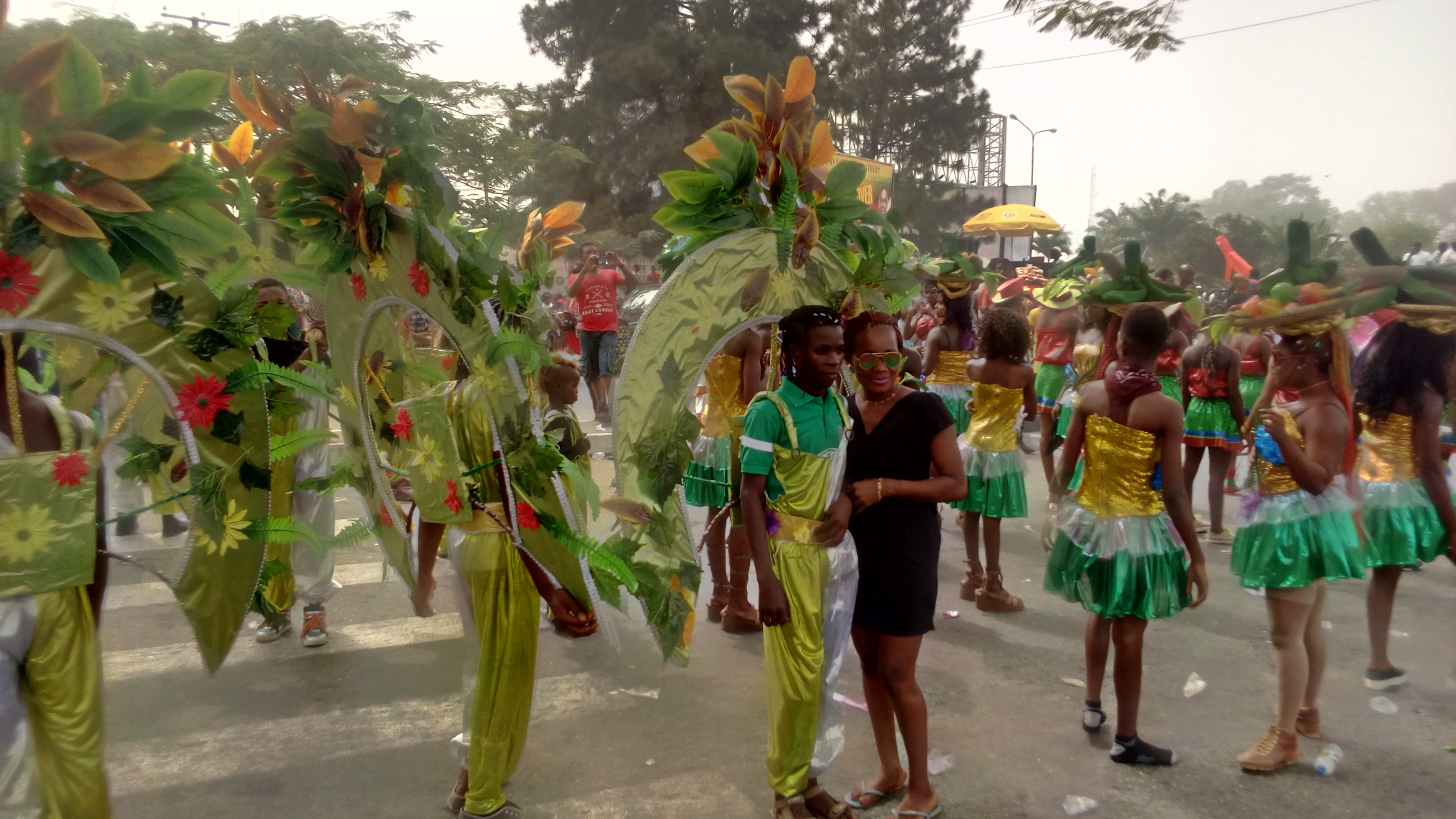

The event hosts local and international musicians, actors and actresses, politicians and other notable men and women. Some of the entertainers who have attended the carnival include Lucky Dube, Akon, Fat Joe, Young Jeezy, Nelly, Kirk Franklin, Sean Kingston, Wizkid, P-Square, Banky W, Ojb Jezreel.

== List of some bands ==
- Calas vegas
- Passion 4
- Freedom band
- Seagull band
- Masta blasta
- Bayside
- Diamond
- Hitfm band
- FAF band (Florence Agogo Foundation)
- Governor band

== Festivals, themes and winners ==
=== 2013 ===
The 2013 Calabar Carnival was focused on Nigerian artists. The winner of the 2013 carnival was Masta Blasta.

=== 2015 ===
The theme for the 2015 Calabar carnival was Climate change. According to the Cross River State former governor Ben Ayade, the carnival was host to more than 15 countries. That year, he adopted beauty queens to form a band known as the governor's band. The winner of the 2015 carnival was Passion 4 band.

=== 2017 ===
Migration has a long history in Africa, as it has also been the home of many cultures for many centuries. The winner of the 2017 carnival was still Passion 4 band.

=== 2018 ===
The 15th edition of the carnival held in 2018. The then Governor of Cross River State Benedict Ayade introduced the theme "Africanism" to tell the African story from the African perspective. The theme was also meant to show that Africa is free from Western Colonization and no longer under their political and economic control. The winner of the 2018 carnival was still Passion 4 band after winning 2 years in a row.

=== 2019 ===
The 2019 Calabar Carnival theme "Humanity" was created to challenge mankind that every human being has a right to existence. The theme was also meant to charge mankind not to be a source of pain to another person's life. Apart from dancing and displaying the culture of the African people, the carnival aimed at addressing the world's problems, one of which is inhumanity. As Governor Benedict Ayade flagged the year's theme - Humanity he emphasized the need for all to shun war as it does not depict the true personalities of those who claim to love humanity. The winners of the 2019 carnival was Pasion 4 and Freedom bands, for the first time in the history of carnival had a tie for the first position.

=== 2020 ===
In 2020, the Cross River State House of Assembly called for a suspension of the festival due to the coronavirus pandemic and restrictions on massive gatherings in the country as well as the mass destruction and looting of goods and infrastructure by hooligans under the auspices of the #EndSARS protest.

=== 2021 ===
In 2021, the Cross River State Government, cancelled the Carnival Calabar Festival due to still COVID-19 pandemic.

=== 2022 ===
Following a two-year break, due to the COVID-19 Pandemic, the Cross River State Government says the 2022 Edition of the annual Africa Biggest Street Party, Carnival Calabar, will be organised to change the face of the state's economy. Briefing journalists in Calabar on the preparation for the event, the Commissioner for Culture and Tourism, Eric Anderson, and the Chairman of the Carnival Commission, Gabe Onah, said the 32 days event will be reloaded and participatory, with skilled and unskilled labour engagement.

Anderson said the gap created from the two years suspension, as a result of COVID-19, will be filled with a mega event, that will change the face of Nigeria's socio-political and economic landscape.

The Director General of Primary Healthcare Development Agency, Dr Janet Ekpenyong, who is heading the health cluster, assured of preparation, to avoid the breakdown of diseases during the event. The state government also announced the increase in the competing bands, from five to seven, including Diamond and Kalasvegas Bands, which are to join the Master Blasta, Passion 4, and freedom, among others.

On 28 December 2022, a drunk driver rammed his vehicle into the carnival's crowd, killing 14 people and wounding 24 more. This led to the governor, Ben Ayade discontinuing the Biker's Parade - a part of the carnival event.

The 2022 Carnival Calabar theme was "Agro-Industrialization".

=== 2023 ===
Last year's theme for the carnival was "Season of Sweetness" and it is Bassey Otu's first carnival as governor.

=== 2024 ===
Cross river state governor, Bassey Otu has announced 2024 Calabar carnival theme to be “Our Shared Prosperity”

=== 2025 ===
Governor Bassey Otu has unveiled "Traces of Time" as the theme 2025 Calabar carnival to mark its 20th anniversary.

=== 2026 ===
At a ceremony in Lagos, Governor Bassey Otu, unveiled the theme for 2026 "Rethinking Our Collective Destiny" which marked the commencement of Carnival activities, He then emphasized that the unveiling of the theme goes beyond the carnival activities. It represents the opening of diverse opportunities for business, economic development, family immersion and communal bonding.

== See also ==
- Festivals in Nigeria
