= Nyima language =

Cross River language spoken in Nigeria

Nyima
- Lenyima
- Native to: Nigeria
- Region: Cross River State
- Ethnicity: Anyima
- Native speakers: 13,000 (2006)
- Language family: Niger–Congo?: Atlantic–Congo; Benue–Congo; Cross River; Upper Cross; Central; East–West; Mbembe–Legbo; Nyima

Language codes
- ISO 639-3: ldg
- Glottolog: leny1238

Nyima
- People: Anyima
- Language: Lenyima

The Nyima language, known as Lenyima or after the people as Anyima, is an Upper Cross River language of Nigeria.
