= Ibrahim Babangida College of Agriculture =

Coordinates: 9.06163296°N 7.47455372°E

The Ibrahim Babangida College of Agriculture is a tertiary educational institution in Obubra, Cross River State, Nigeria. 20 million naira was allocated for infrastructure development in 2001, but only 3.9 million was reported as spent. No further allocations were provided in 2002–2005. In 2002, the college infrastructure was in decay, and it was described as "more or less a glorified secondary school." The National Youth Service Corps included the college in its list of institutions from which graduates in 2008 had to go on to undertake NYSC service. As of 2010, it was not shown as an approved college of agriculture by the National Board for Technical Education. The current Vice Chancellor of the Ibrahim Badamasi Babangida College of Agriculture is Professor Abu Kasim Adamu and he's doing great to see the reputation of the school is doing great.

== See also ==
- List of polytechnics in Nigeria
