= Uyanga language =

Cross River language spoken in Nigeria

Uyanga
- Doko, Iko
- Doko-Uyanga
- Native to: Nigeria
- Region: Cross River State
- Native speakers: (undated figure of 200)
- Language family: Niger–Congo?: Atlantic–Congo; Benue–Congo; Cross River; Upper Cross; Agoi; Uyanga

Language codes
- ISO 639-3: uya
- Glottolog: doko1243
- ELP: Doko-Uyanga

Doko (Iko), or Uyanga, is a minor Upper Cross River language of Nigeria.
