= Yigha language =

Cross River language spoken in Nigeria

Yigha
- Leyigha
- Native to: Nigeria
- Region: Cross River State
- Ethnicity: Ayigha
- Native speakers: (10,000 cited 1989)
- Language family: Niger–Congo?: Atlantic–Congo; Benue–Congo; Cross River; Upper Cross; Central; East–West; Mbembe–Legbo; Yigha

Language codes
- ISO 639-3: ayi
- Glottolog: leyi1238

Yigha
- People: Ayigha
- Language: Leyigha

The Yigha language, known as Leyigha or after the people as Ayigha (Asiga), is an Upper Cross River language of Nigeria.
