= A343 highway (Nigeria) =

Road in Nigeria

Coordinates: 6.318494°N 8.176139°E

Trunk Road A343

Location
- Country: Nigeria

Highway system
- Transport in Nigeria

The A343 highway is a highway in Nigeria. It is one of the east–west roads that links to the main south–north roads. (It is named for the two highways that it links).

== Route ==
The A343 highway runs from the A3 highway in Enugu, the capital of Enugu State — to the A4 highway at Emandak, Cross River State.

It passes through Abakaliki, the capital of Ebonyi State.
