= Kukelle =

Upper Cross River language of Nigeria

Kele
- Kukelle
- Native to: Cross River Nigeria
- Ethnicity: Ukelle
- Native speakers: 180,000 to 200,000 (2011)
- Language family: Niger–Congo?: Atlantic–Congo; Benue–Congo; Cross River; Upper Cross; Central; North–South; Koring–Kukele; Kele

Language codes
- ISO 639-3: kez
- Glottolog: kuke1242

Kele (Kukelle) is an Upper Cross River language of Nigeria. This language is mostly spoken in Yala Local Government area of Cross River State. Ukelle have North and South Ukelle with slight differences between their intonation.
