= Old Residency Museum =

Museum in Nigeria

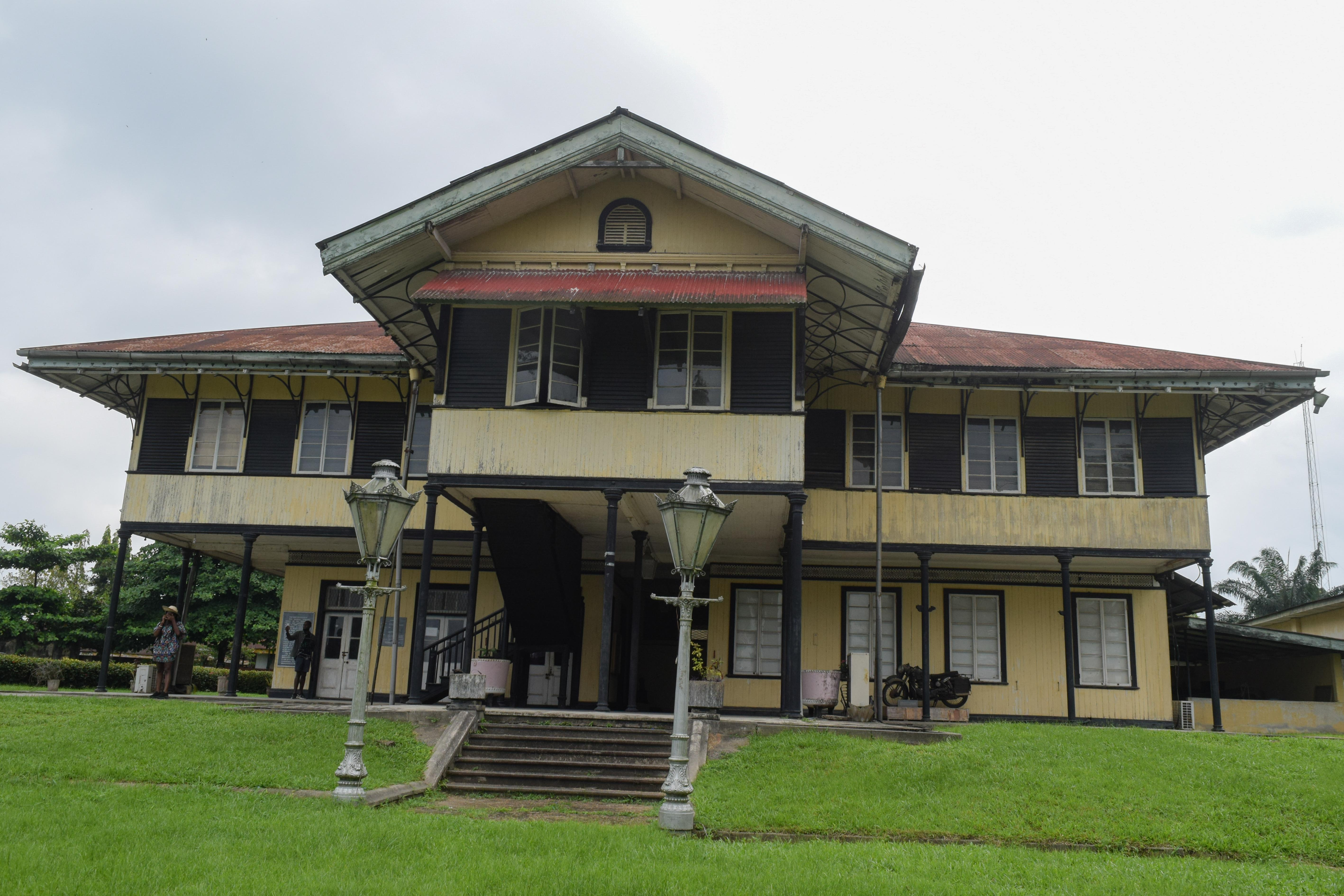
- Established: 1884
- Location: Calabar, Nigeria
- Coordinates: 4°58′33″N 8°20′30″E

The Old Residency Museum is a government-run museum in the city of Calabar in Nigeria. The museum was constructed in the colonial time in 1884 in old Calabar and was named as the Government House.

As per the museum records, it was pre-fabricated in Britain and later erected in Calabar to accommodate the British officials in the Niger area. Old Residency Museum is constructed using minerals imported from Britain by the Royal Niger Company. The house is now a museum which is managed by the National Commission for Museums and it displays the largest collection of Nigerian documents and artifacts about the history of the Calabar and Cross River regions and slavery The museum is situated between presidential lodges and the residence of the chief judge of Cross River State. Old Residency Museum was a ministerial guest house in 1950. The building was declared a national monument in 1959 and has been renovated over time by the National Commission for Museums and Monuments in 1986. Old Residency Museum was reported to be not maintained well by the authorities due to lack of funds. The Cross River State Government has also reported to shut down the kitchen and the adjoining field that serves as a source of revenue and relaxation
