= Mkpani =

Village in Cross River State, Nigeria

- Village
- Interactive map of Mkpani
- Country: Nigeria
- State: Cross River
- Local Government Area: Yakurr Local Government

Government

Area
  - Village: 53.2 km^{2} (20.5 sq mi)
  - Urban: 653 km^{2} (252 sq mi)

Dimensions
  - Width: 150 km (93 mi)

Population
  - Village: 8,000
  - Density: 150/km^{2} (390/sq mi)
- Time zone: UTC+1 (WAT/CET)

Mkpani is a village in the Yakurr Local Government Area of Cross River State, Nigeria. This community gave birth to two communities, Lebang, and Lopon. Mkpani is 120 km wide and has an area of 340 km^{2}. The population is 8,000 people. Mkpani community is known for its farming system of planting yam, cassava, maize, plantain and many more agricultural crops. This community is made of three (3) different wards (clans). The community has only one council ward joined with the neighboring community, Agoi-Bami. The Mkpani community is known for their hospitable welcoming spirit
