= Arthur Jarvis University =

Private university in Nigeria

Coordinates: 4.93804°N 8.46483°E

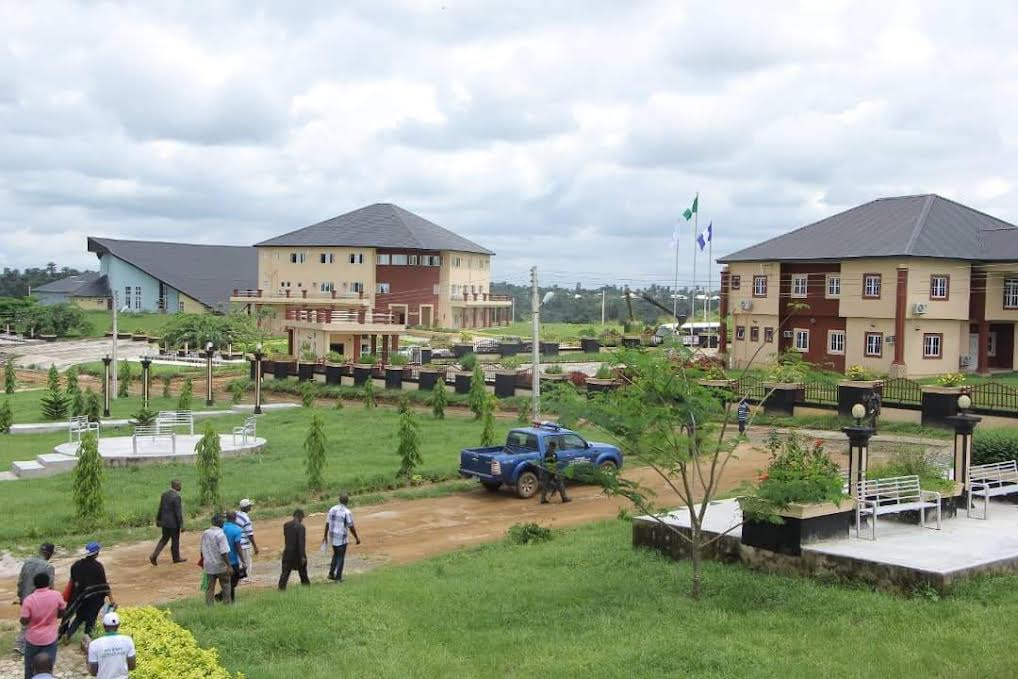
- Type: Private
- Accreditation: National Universities Commission
- Chancellor: Arthur Archibong
- Vice-Chancellor: Prof. Joseph Ekpe Edet
- Location: Calabar, Cross River State, Nigeria
- Campus: Urban
- Website: Official website

Arthur Jarvis University (AJU) is a private university in Calabar, Nigeria founded in 2016. The school is the first private university in Cross River State.

== Faculties ==
=== Faculty of Natural and Applied Sciences ===
Department of Biological Sciences

- Biology
- Microbiology
- Plant Science & Biotechnology

Department of Chemical Sciences

- Chemistry
- Biochemistry

Department of Earth Sciences

- Geology
- Applied Geophysics

Department of Mathematics and Computer Sciences

- Computer Science
- Mathematics
- Cybersecurity
- Software Engineering
- Data Science
- Artificial Intelligence

Department of Physics

- Physics

=== Faculty of Humanities Management and Social Sciences ===
Department of Accounting and Banking & Finance

- Accounting
- Banking & Finance

Department of Business Administration

- Business Administration
- Entrepreneurial Studies

Department of Criminology & Security Studies

- Criminology & Security Studies

Department of Marketing

- Marketing

Department of Economics

- Economics

Department of Mass Communication and Digital Media

- Mass Communication

Department of Political Science

- Public Administration
- Political Science

Department of Hospitality and Tourism Management

- Hospitality and Tourism Management

Department of Sociology/Social Work

- Sociology
- Peace & Conflict Resolution

Department of Languages and Linguistics

- English

=== Faculty of Basic Medical Sciences ===
Department of Human Anatomy

- Anatomy

Department of Human Physiology

- Human Anatomy

Department of Public Health

- Public Health

Department of Nursing Science

- Nursing Science

Department of Medical Laboratory Science

- Medical Laboratory Science
- Radiography

Department of Optometry

- Optometry

=== Faculty of Law ===
Department of Law

- Law

== Admission requirements ==
Applicants seeking admission into the school must possess a minimum of five credits in SSCE, GCE, NECO, or an accredited equivalent, comprising English Language, Mathematics, and three other subjects as stipulated for each program. These credits must be attained in a maximum of two exam sittings. Applicants must also sit for JAMB UTME and attain the minimum score required.

== Matriculation ==
The university matriculated 120 students in the first year after establishment.

=== Convocation ===
In April 2023 the university celebrated a combined convocation ceremony with 251 students.

== Founding ==
The University was founded by Sir Arthur Jarvis Archibong, a Nigerian businessman and politician. He is the first son of former military governor of old Cross River State General Dan Archibong.

== See also ==
- List of academic libraries in Nigeria
