= Yakö language =

Upper Cross River language spoken in Nigeria

Yakö
- Lokaa
- Native to: Nigeria
- Region: Cross River State
- Ethnicity: Yakö people
- Native speakers: (120,000 cited 1989)
- Language family: Niger–Congo?: Atlantic–Congo; Benue–Congo; Cross River; Upper Cross; Central; East–West; Loko languages; Yakö

Language codes
- ISO 639-3: yaz
- Glottolog: loka1252

The Yakö language (also Lokö or Lokạạ) is an Upper Cross River language of the Yakö people (Yakurr) of Nigeria.

== Phonology ==
=== Consonants ===
		Labial	Alveolar	Palatal	Velar	Labio- velar
Nasal		m	n		ŋ	
Plosive/ Affricate	voiceless	p	t		k	k͡p
Plosive/ Affricate	voiced	b	d	d͡ʒ	ɡ	ɡ͡b
Fricative		f	s			
Tap			(ɾ)			
Lateral			l			
Approximant				j		w

- [ɾ] may occur as an allophone of /d/, a variant of /l/, or as a result of contact with other languages such as Efik or Yoruba.
- Sounds /b, t, d/ are heard as unreleased [b̚, t̚, d̚] when in word-final position.

=== Vowels ===
	Front	Central	Back
High	i iː		u uː
High-mid	e eː	ə əː	o oː
Low-mid	ɛ ɛː	ə əː	ɔ ɔː
Low		a aː	
