= Obubra =

- LGA and town
- Interactive map of Obubra
- Location in Nigeria
- Coordinates: 6°05′0″N 8°20′0″E
- Country: Nigeria
- State: Cross River State

Government
  - Local Government Chairman: Hon.Kingsley Arikpo

Area
  - Total: 1,115 km^{2} (431 sq mi)

Population (2006)
  - Total: 172,444
  - Density: 154.7/km^{2} (400.6/sq mi)
- Time zone: UTC+1 (WAT)
- Postal code: 551
- Website: www.crossriverhub.com.ng/obubra

Obubra is a town and Local Government Area (LGA) of Cross River State, Nigeria. The Ibrahim Babangida College of Agriculture is located in Obubra.

The National Youth Service Corps, Cross River State Orientation Camp is situated in Obubra town.

The word Obubra is derived from 'Ubibira or Ubira', the name of Obubra main village at the bank of the Cross river. Obubra however, was used to represent an administrative unit under the British colonial empire in the late 19th century. The exact history of the signed treaties of Community heads and the representatives of the British empire are in antiquity.

It covered areas bounded by Abakaliki and Ikom to the North, and Afikpo and Calabar to the South. This meant that its jurisdiction extended from parts of present-day Biase and Akamkpa local government areas through Abi, Yakurr and Etung to parts of Ikom and Ogoja local government areas.

Presently Obubra Local Government Area has eleven Council wards of Ababene, Ofat, Ofodua, Ovonum, Apiapum, Iyamoyong, Ochon, Obubra Urban, Ofumbongha/Yala, Osopong I and Osopong II.

Most of the communities emerged as settlements of intercommunal wars. The lines of friction which had existed from ancestral origin are heated up and the people divided by their political elites who disagree to agree on a common political leadership or a channel for socioeconomic development of Obubra Urban, wherein lies the headquarters, and then spread to all communities. Obubra has 98 villages some of which include; Obubra Village, Ogada, Owakande, Imabana Itamtet, Apiapum, Yala, Iyamoyong, Ohana, Ochon, Isabang, Ovunom, Ofodua, Ofat, Ababene, Oderegha, Okorogbana, Onyedama, Ebo, and Iko, Ogurude, Ofonmana, Ogurokpon, Okimbongha, Ofonagama, Omene, Ofonamma, Ofonekom, Appiapumtet, Idoru 1 and 2, Ijutum, Eja, Ijagha Orangha, Aragharagha, Ogamina, the list continuous.

It has an area of 1,115 km^{2} and a population of 172,444 at the 2006 census. St. Francis Xavier Parish, which today has given birth to five (5) other parishes, was originally founded in 1965. However, the first Holy Mass was celebrated in 1961, as missionaries visited to source for land for a Secondary school (St Brendan's) later located at Iyamoyong, about 15 kilometers away.

The postal code of the area is 551.

== Climate ==
In Obubra, the dry season is hot, humid, and partially cloudy, while the wet season is warm, stuffy, and cloudy. Throughout the year, the average temperature fluctuates between 19 °C (67 °F) and 32 °C (89 °F), rarely falling below 16 °C (60 °F) or rising above 33 °C (92 °F).

== Geography and economy ==
Obubra LGA has an average temperature of 25 degrees Celsius or 77 degrees Fahrenheit and covers an area of 1,115 square kilometres or 431 square miles. The LGA has an average humidity level of 70% and is heavily forested. There are two main seasons in the LGA: the dry season and the rainy season. The rainy season is typically marked by persistent, heavy rain.

In Obubra LGA, a variety of economic pursuits, including fishing and logging, are highly popular. Obubra LGA is a thriving agricultural region that is well-known for growing a variety of commodities, including rice and oil palm. The residents of Obubra LGA also work in crafts, hunting, and wood carving, among other significant professions.
