= Yakurr =

Settlement in Cross River State, Nigeria

- LGA
- Interactive map of Yakurr
- Country: Nigeria
- State: Cross River State
- Capital: Ugep

Government
  - Local Government Chairman: Hon. Yibala Igri Inyang

Area
  - Total: 670 km^{2} (260 sq mi)

Population (2006)
  - Total: 196,450
  - Density: 290/km^{2} (760/sq mi)
- Time zone: UTC+1 (WAT)
- Postal code: 543
- Website: www.crossriverhub.com.ng/yakurr

Yakurr is a Local Government Area of Cross River State, Nigeria. Its capital is the town of Ugep. The local government area (LGA) was carved out of Obubra local government in 1987.

Yakurr has an area of 670 km^{2} and a population of 196,450 at the 2006 census. The postal code of the area is 543.

Major settlements in the local government area include: Ugep, Mkpani, Idomi, Ekori, Inyima, Nko, Assiga, Agoi Ibami, Agoi Ekpo, and Agoi Efreke.

== Geography and Economy ==
Yakurr Local Government The Yakurr Local Government Area maintains an average temperature of around 25 °C or 77 °F and is home to numerous waterways, among them the Kosanmah River. It boasts rich forest resources and experiences an annual rainfall of approximately 2,950 millimetres or 116 inches. Wind conditions in the area are generally mild, with an average speed of about 10 kilometres per hour or 6.2 miles per hour.

Farming is an important economic activity in Yakurr LGA with crops such as okro, maize, pumpkin, cashew, rubber, and plantain grown in the area. A number of mineral resources such as kaolin and quartzite are also found in Yakurr LGA. Other important occupations of the people of Yakurr LGA include fishing, trade, lumbering, wood carving, craftsmaking, and food processing.

== Notable people ==
- Okoi Arikpo, first Nigerian minister for foreign affairs
- Usani Uguru Usani, former Minister of Niger Delta

== See also ==
- Yako people
