= Akamkpa =

Coordinates: 5.3°N 8.3°E

- LGA and town
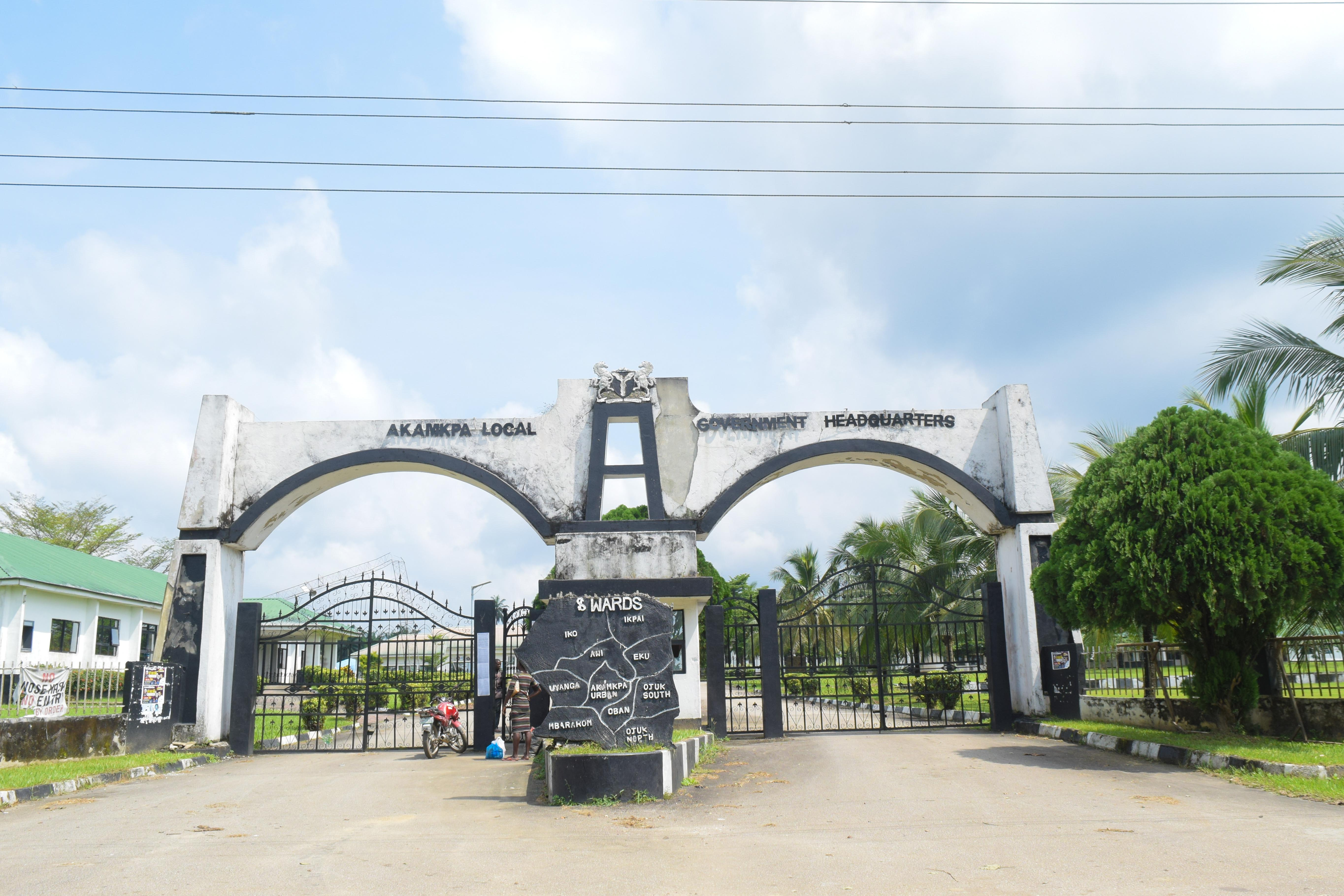
- Interactive map of Akamkpa
- Country: Nigeria
- State: Cross River State

Government
  - Local Government Chairman: Hon. Felix Akposi

Area
  - Total: 5,003 km^{2} (1,932 sq mi)

Population (2006)
  - Total: 151,125
  - Density: 30.21/km^{2} (78.24/sq mi)
- Time zone: UTC+1 (WAT)
- Postal code: 542
- Website: www.crossriverhub.com.ng/akamkpa

Akamkpa is a town and local government area of Cross River State, Nigeria.

It has an area of 5,003 square kilometres (1,932 mi^{2}) and a population of 151,125 at the 2006 census.

The postal code of the area is 542.

== Climate ==
In Akamkpa, the dry season is hot, humid, and usually cloudy, while the wet season is warm, stuffy, and overcast. Throughout the year, the average temperature fluctuates between 20 °C (68 °F) to 31 °C (88 °F); it is rarely lower or higher than 16 °C (61 °F) or 33 °C (91 °F).

== Economy ==
Akamkpa Local Government Area is known for its agricultural background, hosting several major farms such as the Kwa Fall oil palm estate, Ayup Eku oil palm estate, the Crel Rubber estate, and the Calaro oil palm estate. The area also has crude oil resources, and many residents engage in fishing. In addition, Akamkpa is endowed with large granite deposits and is home to more than 30 quarry companies.
