= Cross River languages =

Branch of Benue–Congo languages spoken in Nigeria and Cameroon

Cross River
- Delta–Cross
- Geographic distribution: Southeastern Nigeria, southwestern Cameroon
- Linguistic classification: Niger–Congo?: Atlantic–Congo; Volta-Congo; Benue–Congo; Bantoid–Cross; Cross River
- Subdivisions: Upper Cross; Lower Cross; Ogoni (Kegboid); Central Delta

Language codes
- Glottolog: delt1251
- The Cross River languages shown within Nigeria and Cameroon: Central Delta Ogoni Lower Cross: Obolo Lower Cross proper Upper Cross: Upper Cross besides Central Central Upper Cross: North–South East–West

The Cross River or Delta–Cross languages are a branch of the Benue–Congo language family spoken in south-easternmost Nigeria, with some speakers in south-westernmost Cameroon. The branch was first formulated by Joseph Greenberg; it is one of the few of his branches of Niger–Congo that has withstood the test of time.

Greenberg's Cross River family originally included the Bendi languages. The Bendi languages were soon seen to be very different and thus were made a separate branch of Cross River, while the other languages were united under the branch Delta–Cross. However, the inclusion of Bendi in Cross River at all is doubtful, and it has been tentatively reassigned to the Southern Bantoid family, making the terms Cross River and Delta–Cross now synonymous.

== Demographics ==
In Nigeria, these languages are spoken in Cross River State, Akwa Ibom state, Rivers State, Bayelsa State, Ebonyi State and Benue State. The Ibibio language is also spoken in Abia State.

== Languages ==
There are four primary branches of Cross River:

- Central Delta; 8 languages, the most populous being Ogbia with 100,000 speakers
- Ogoni; 5 languages, with Ogoni proper (Khana) having 200,000 speakers
- Upper Cross River; 22 languages, the most populous being Lokaa with 120,000 speakers
- Lower Cross River; 23 languages, the most populous being Ibibio language (3.5 million speakers)

== Branches and locations ==
Below is a list of major Cross River branches and their primary locations (centres of diversity) in southeast Nigeria and southwest Cameroon based on Blench (2019).

Distributions of Cross River branches in Nigeria
Branch	Primary locations
Upper Cross River	Obubra, Abi, Biase, Yala, Yakurr, Odukpani, Ikom and Akamkpa LGAs, Cross River State The Korring, Kukele, Mbembe language of Ebonyi State; The Korop language of Southwest Cameroon
Lower Cross River	Akwa Ibom State (All local Government Areas) Andoni LGA, Rivers State; Lower Cross River State; The Usaghade language of Southwest Cameroon
Ogoni	Gokana, Tai, Khana and Eleme LGAs, Rivers State
Central Delta	Abua–Odual, Ahoada West LGAs, Rivers State Ogbia, Yenagoa LGAs, Bayelsa State

== Internal classification ==
Roger Blench (2008: 4) classifies the Cross River languages as follows.

- Cross River
  - ? Bendi (Yakoro, Bendi, Alege, Bumaji, Bokyi, etc.)
  - Delta-Cross
    - Upper Cross
      - Core
        - North-South (Koring, Kukele, Kohumono, Agwagwune, etc.)
        - East-West (Ikom, Mbembe, Legbo, etc.)
      - Ukpet-Ehom
      - Agoi, Doko, Iyongiyong
      - Kiong, Korop
    - Lower Cross
      - East (Efik, Ibibio, Anaang, Efiat, etc.)
      - Central (Enwang, Uda)
      - West (Ebughu, Oro, Usakade, Obolo, etc.)
    - Ogoni
      - Eleme; Baan (Ogoi)
      - Gokana; Tẹẹ (Tai); Kana
    - Central Delta
      - Abuan, Odual
      - Kugbo, Ogbia, etc.

Although Blench (2004) tentatively included the Bendi languages as possibly being a Cross River outlier branch, the Bendi languages are generally classified as Southern Bantoid.

== See also ==
- Cross River (Nigeria), the namesake of the language group

== Bibliography ==
- Blench, Roger (2019). An Atlas of Nigerian Languages (4th ed.). Cambridge: Kay Williamson Educational Foundation.
- Connell, Bruce (1994). "The lower Cross river languages: A prolegomena to the classification of the Cross river languages". Journal of West African Languages. 24 (1): 3–46.
- Faraclas, Nicholas (1986). "Cross river as a model for the evolution of Benue-Congo nominal class/concord systems" (PDF). Studies in African Linguistics. 17 (1): 39–54. doi:10.32473/sal.v17i1.107495. S2CID 126381408.
- Greenberg, Joseph H. (1963). The Languages of Africa. Bloomingtom: Indiana University.
