= Cross River State =

State of Nigeria

Cross River
- State
- State of Cross River
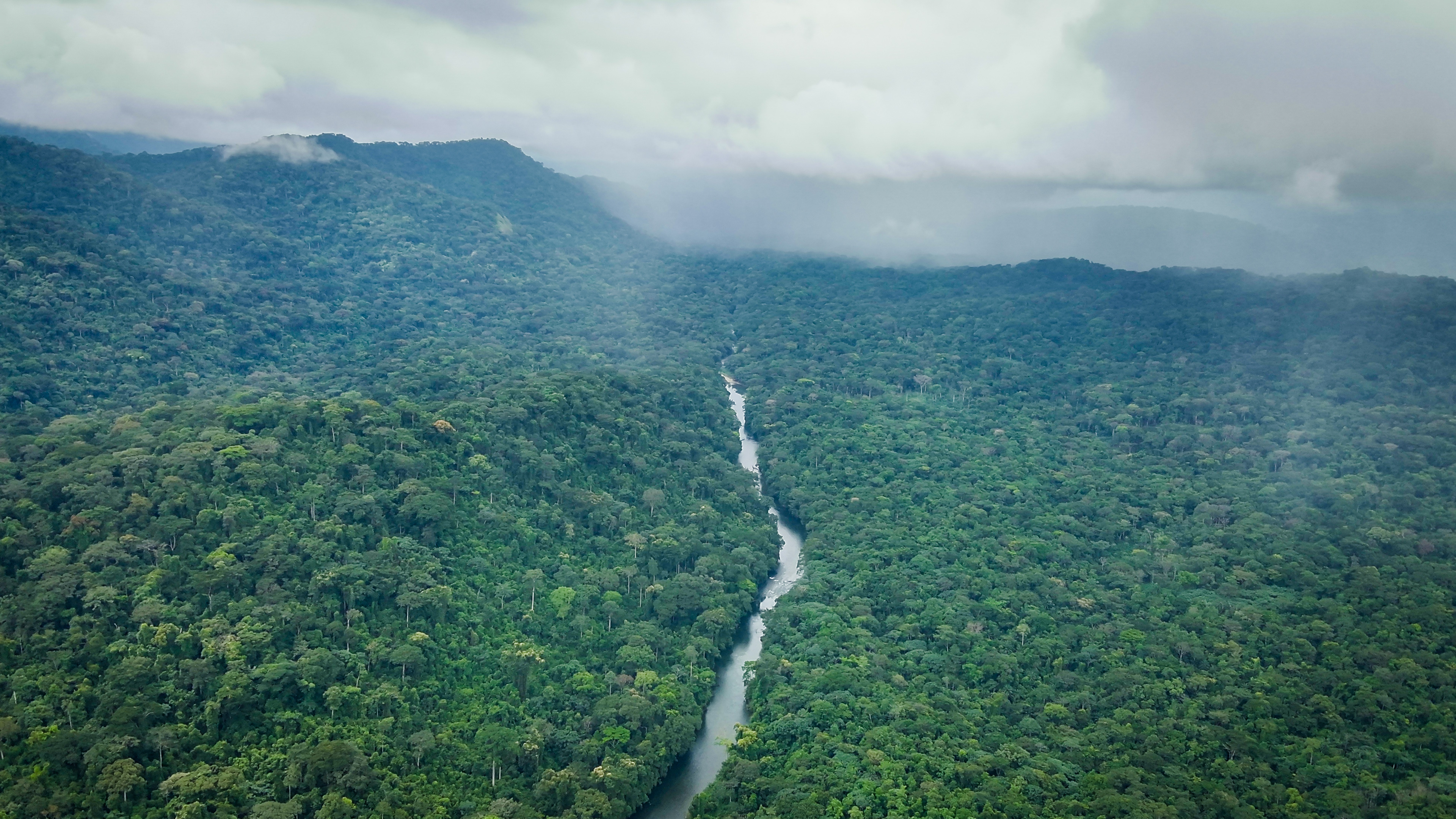
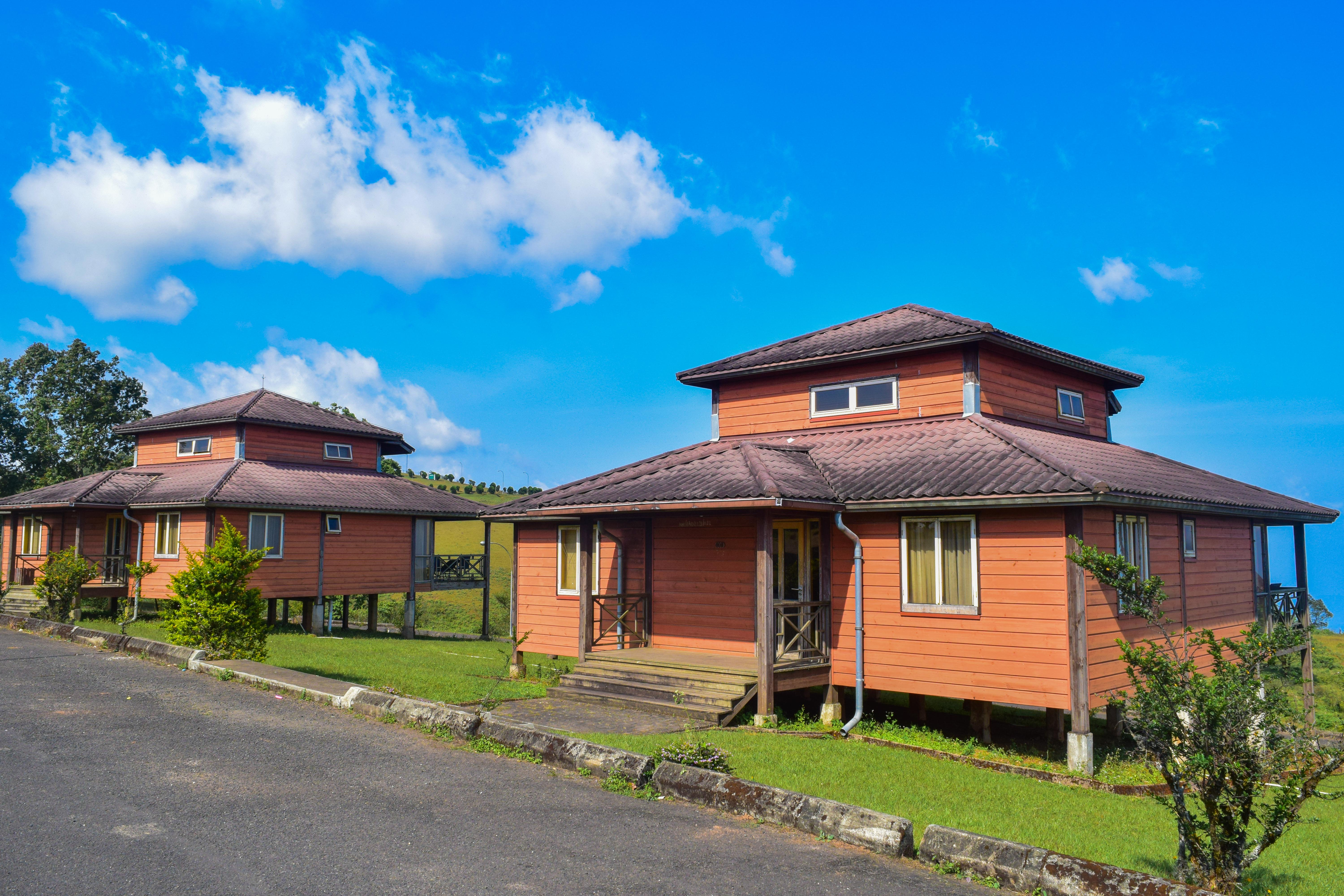
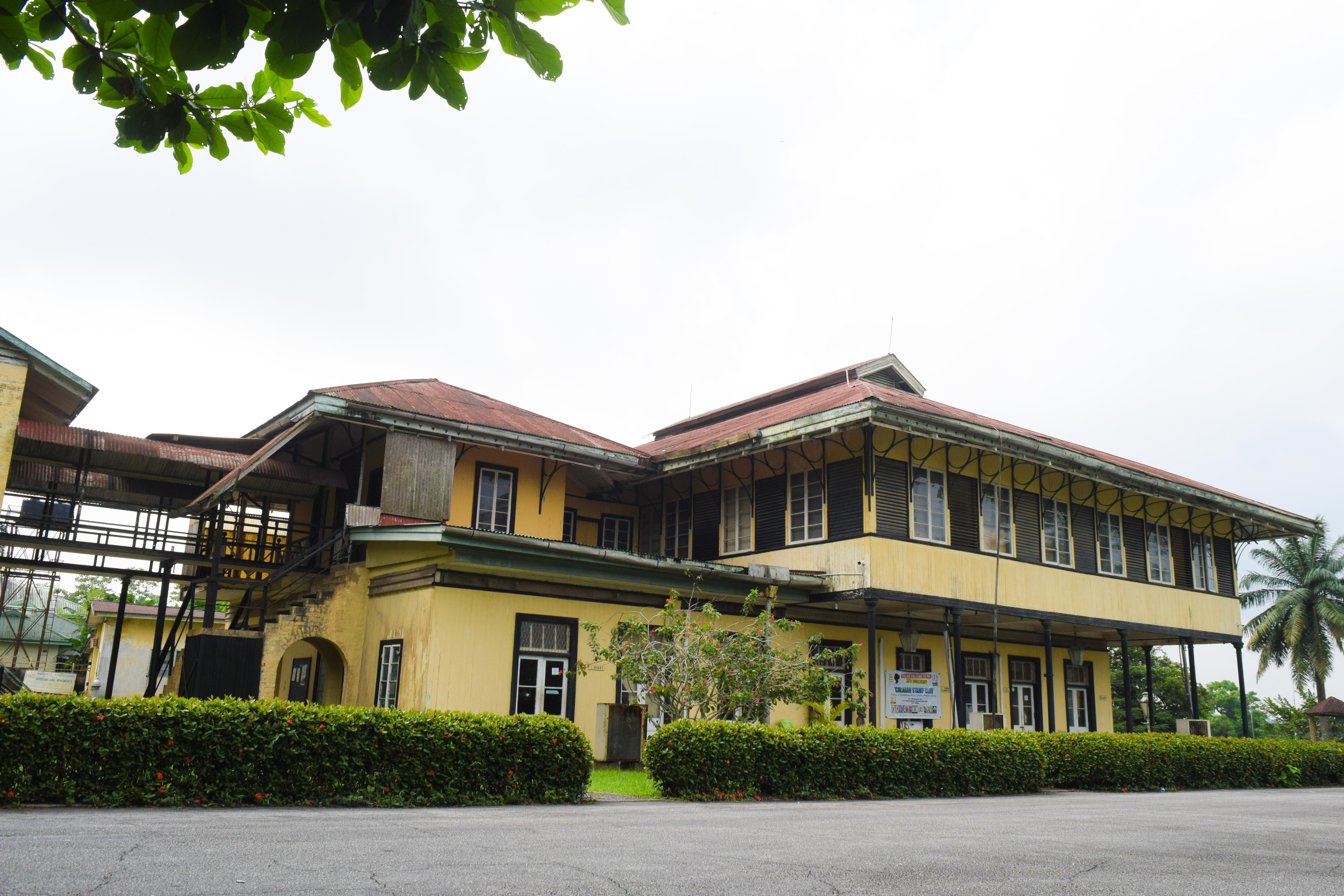
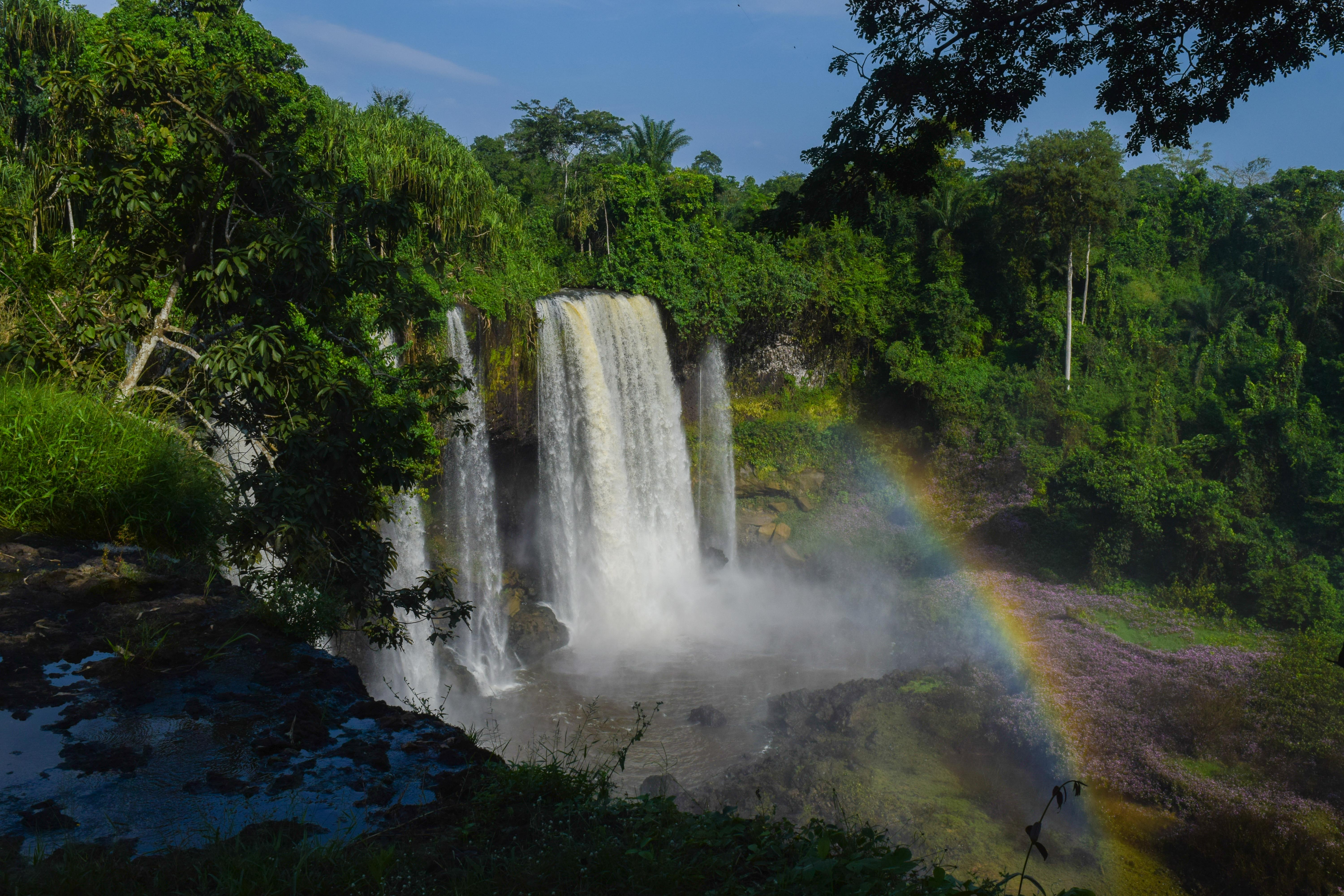
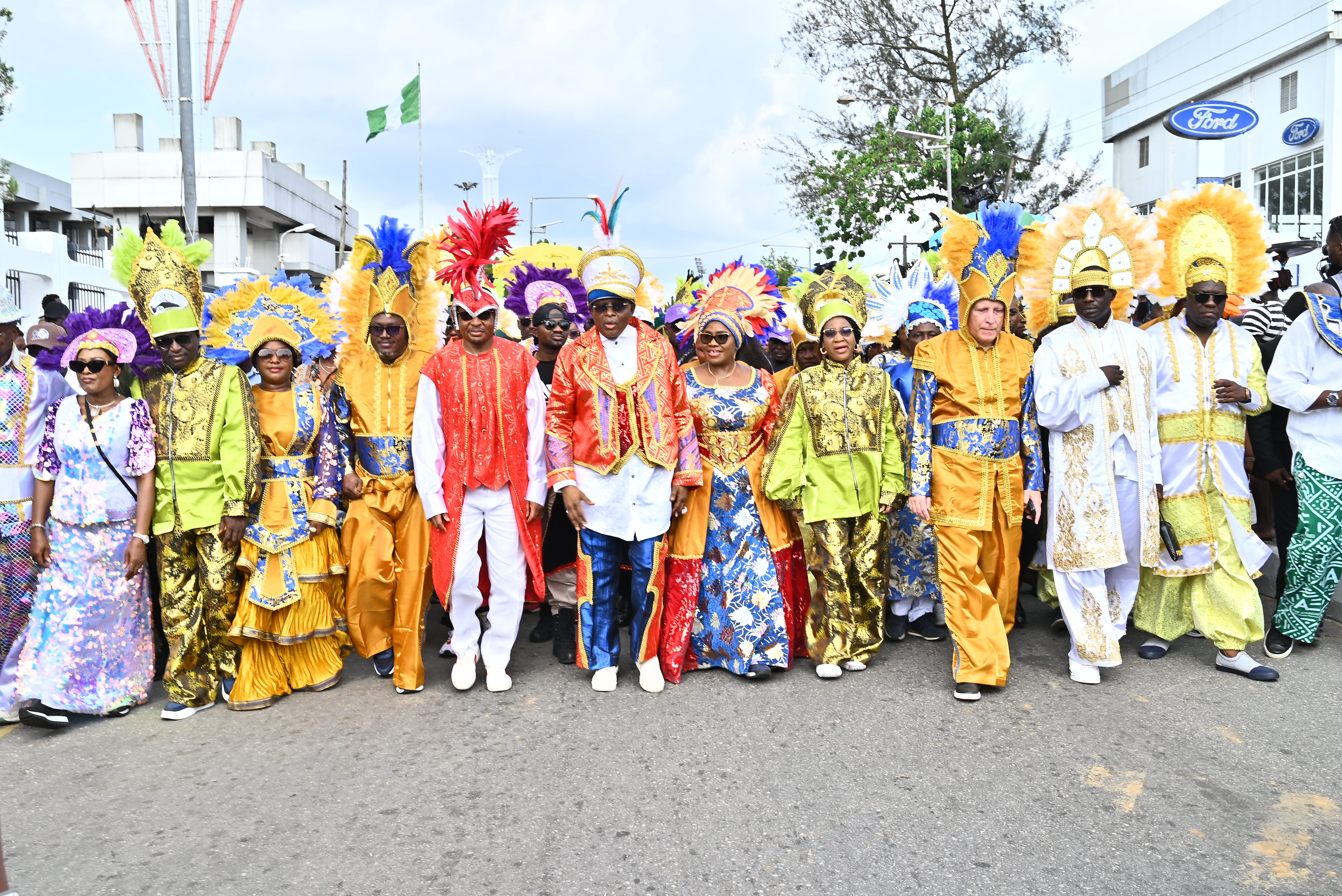
- Cross River National Park Obudu Mountain Resort Old Residency Museum Agbokim Waterfalls Calabar Carnival

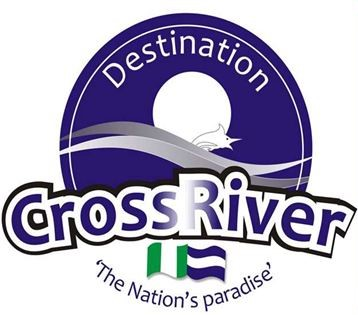
- Flag Seal
- Nicknames: The People's Paradise (French: Le paradis des gens)
- Location of Cross River State in Nigeria
- Coordinates: 5°45′N 8°30′E
- Country: Nigeria
- Geopolitical Zone: South South
- LGAs: 18
- Date created: 27 May 1967
- Capital: Calabar

Government
  - Body: Government of Cross River State
  - Governor: Bassey Otu (APC)
  - Deputy Governor: Peter Odey (APC)
  - Legislature: Cross River State House of Assembly
  - Senators: C: Eteng Jonah Williams (APC); N: Agom Jarigbe (PDP); S: Asuquo Ekpenyong (APC)
  - Representatives: List

Area
  - Total: 20,156 km^{2} (7,782 sq mi)
  - Rank: 19th of 36

Population (2022)
  - Total: 4,406,200
  - Rank: 28th of 36
  - Density: 218.60/km^{2} (566.18/sq mi)

GDP (PPP)
  - Year: 2021
  - Total: $26.33 billion 14th of 36
  - Per capita: $5,892; 14th of 36
- Time zone: UTC+01 (WAT)
- postal code: 540001
- ISO 3166 code: NG-CR
- HDI (2022): 0.675 medium · 5th of 37

Cross River State is a state in the South-South geopolitical zone of Nigeria. Named for the Cross River, the state was formed from the eastern part of the Eastern Region on 27 May 1967. The state has its capital as Calabar and is bordered to the north by Benue State, to the west by Ebonyi State and Abia State, and to the southwest by Akwa Ibom State while its eastern border forms part of the national border with Cameroon. Originally known as the South-Eastern State before being renamed in 1976, Cross River state formerly included the area that is now Akwa Ibom State, which became a distinct state in 1987.

Of the 36 states, Cross River is the nineteenth largest in area and 27th most populous with an estimated population of over 3.8 million as of 2016. Geographically, the state is mainly divided between the Guinean forest–savanna mosaic in the far north and the Cross–Sanaga–Bioko coastal forests in the majority of the interior of the state. The smaller ecoregions are the Central African mangroves in the coastal far south and a part of the montane Cameroonian Highlands forests in the extreme northeast. The most major geographical feature is the state's namesake, the Cross River which bisects Cross River State's interior before forming much of the state's western border and flowing into the Cross River Estuary. Other important rivers are the Calabar and Great Kwa rivers which flow from the inland Oban Hills before flanking the city of Calabar and flowing into the Cross River Estuary as well. In the forested interior of the state are several biodiverse protected areas including the Cross River National Park, Afi Mountain Wildlife Sanctuary, and Mbe Mountains Community Forest. These wildlife reserves contain populations of Preuss's red colobus, African forest buffalo, bat hawk, tree pangolin, grey-necked rockfowl, and West African slender-snouted crocodile along with some of Nigeria's last remaining Nigeria-Cameroon chimpanzee, drill, African forest elephant, and Cross River gorilla populations.

Demographically, Cross River State is inhabited by several ethnic groups, primarily the Ekoi (Ejagham) and the Efik of the Lower Cross River (Lower Cross); the Akunakuna, Boki, Bahumono, and Yakö (Yakurr) of the Middle Cross River (Mid Cross) and the Bekwarra, Bette, Igede, the Mbube people and Ukelle (Kukele) of the Upper Cross River (Upper Cross). In the pre-colonial period, what is now Cross River State was divided between its ethnic groups with some joining the Aro Confederacy while the Efik founded the Akwa Akpa (Old Calabar) city-state. The latter become a British protectorate in 1884 as the capital of the Oil Rivers Protectorate but it was not until the early 1900s that the British actually gained formal control of the entire area. Around the same time, the protectorate (now renamed the Niger Coast Protectorate) was incorporated into the Southern Nigeria Protectorate which later merged into British Nigeria. After the merger, much of modern-day Cross River became a centre of anti-colonial resistance during the Women's War and trade through the international seaport at Calabar.

After independence in 1960, the area of now-Cross River was a part of the post-independence Eastern Region until 1967 when the region was split and the area became part of the South-Eastern State. Less than two months afterwards, the Igbo-majority former Eastern Region attempted to secede as the state of Biafra; in the three-year long Nigerian Civil War, Calabar and its port was hard fought over in Operation Tiger Claw while people from Cross River were persecuted by Biafran forces as they were mainly non-Igbo[This is not confirmed to be true that Cross River was oppressed by Igbos as it well noted that the Biafran Leader General Ojukwu enjoyed support from Efik & Ibibio ethnic group which is supported by the fact that his Deputy was an Efik man & his the Biafran police IG was an Ibibio man by the name Edet]. At the war's end and the reunification of Nigeria, the South-Eastern State was reformed until 1976 when it was renamed Cross River State. Eleven years later, Cross River State was divided with western Cross River being broken off to form the new Akwa Ibom State. The state formerly contained the oil-producing Bakassi Peninsula, but it was ceded to Cameroon under the terms of the Greentree Agreement.

As an agricultural state, the Cross River's economy partially relies on crops, such as cocoyam, rubber, oil palm, yam, cocoa, cashews, and plantain crops, along with fishing. Key minor industries involve tourism in and around the wildlife reserves along with the historic Ikom Monoliths site, Calabar Carnival, and Obudu Mountain Resort. Cross River state has the joint-thirteenth highest Human Development Index in the country and numerous institutions of tertiary education.

== History ==
Cross River as a south-south state was created on 27 May 1967 from the former Eastern Region, Nigeria, by the General Yakubu Gowon regime. Its name was changed to Cross River state in the 1976 state creation exercise by the then General Murtala Mohammed regime from South Eastern State.The present-day Akwa Ibom State was excised from it in the state creation exercise of September 1987 by the then regime of General Ibrahim Babangida. The struggle for a new state creation started in 1980 in the reign of president Shehu Shagari where Senator Joseph Oqua Ansa (Mon) the senator representing Calabar senatorial district then was at the helm of affairs. Its capital is Calabar. Its major towns are Calabar Municipality, Akamkpa, Biase, Calabar South, Ikom, Igede, Obubra, Odukpani, Ogoja, Bekwarra, Ugep, Obudu, Obanliku, Akpabuyo, Ofutop, Iso-bendghe, Danare, Boki, Yala, Bendeghe Ekiem, Etomi, Ediba, Itigidi, Ugep, Ukpe and Ukelle.

The state has many governors and administrators including Udoakaha J. Esuene, Paul Omu, Tunde Elegbede, Clement Isong, Donald Etiebet, Daniel Archibong, Ibim Princewill, Ernest Attah, Clement Ebri, Ibrahim Kefas, Gregory Agboneni, Umar Faoruk Ahmed, Christopher Osondu, Donald Duke, Liyel Imoke and Benedict Ayade. The current Governor is Bassey Edet Otu, who was sworn into office on 29 May 2023. He was elected for a four-year term in office under the platform of All Progressive Congress (APC).

== Geography ==
Cross River State derives its name from the Cross River, which passes through the state. It is a coastal state located in the Niger Delta region, and occupies 20,156 square kilometres (7,782 sq mi). It shares boundaries with Benue state to the north for 188 km (117 miles), Ebonyi and Abia states to the west for 198 km (123 miles) and about 52 km respectively (partly across Cross River), to the east by Sud-Ouest Province in Cameroon for about 290 km (181 miles), partly across the Sankwala Mountains and the Akwayafe River, and to the south by Akwa-Ibom for about 114 km (71 miles) mostly across Cross River and the Atlantic Ocean. The state is made up of 18 Local Government Area Councils.

=== Climate ===
Like few other Nigerian states, the climate of Cross River state is tropical. Not only this, the state is also characterized by relative humidity. The average temperature of the state is between 15 °C (59 °F) and 30 °C (86 °F). However, this climatic condition is different in locations within the Cross River state such as the high plateau of Obudu, which has a record of a fall in temperature between 4 °C (39 °F) and 10 °C (50 °F), as a result of the high altitude of this area. The capital city of the State, Calabar, has a significant record of rainfall within the year, while the dry season has less significant effect in the state due to the depth of rainfall experienced. Based on the records presented by the Climate Data of the state, the annual rainfall of Cross River state is 3306mm (130.2 inches).

== Demographics ==
The State is composed of several ethnic groups, which include the Efik, the Ejagham, Yakurr, Bahumono, Bette, Yala, Igede, Ukelle and the Bekwarra among others. There are four major languages spoken in the state: English, the common language, Efik, Bekwarra, and Ejagham. The Efik language is widely spoken in Cross River State, especially in Calabar Municipality, Calabar South, Akpabuyo, Bakassi, Akampkpa, Biase, and Odukpani Local Government Areas. The Ejagham language is also a widely spoken language in Cross River State.

The Efik-speaking people live mainly in the Southern senatorial districts of Cross River, or as it is commonly referred to, the Greater Calabar district, which includes Calabar Municipality, Calabar South, Bakassi, Biase, Akpabuyo, Odukpani, and Akamkpa LGAs. There is also the Qua community in Calabar, which speaks Ejagham. The main Ejagham group occupies mostly the Greater Calabar areas of Calabar Municipality, Odukpani, Biase, and Akamkpa sections of Cross River State.

There are also the Yakurr /Agoi/Bahumono ethnic groups in Yakurr and Abi LGA, while the Mbembe are predominantly found in Obubra LGA. Further up the core northern part of the state are several sub-dialectical groups, among which are Etung, Olulumo, Ofutop, Nkim/Nkum, Abanajum, Nseke and Boki in both Ikom, Etung and Boki LGAs. Also, the Yala/Yache, Igede, Ukelle, Ekajuk, Mbube, Bette, Bekwarra, and Utukwang people are found in Ogoja, Yala, Obudu, Obanliku, and Bekwarra LGAs. The Yala is a subgroup of the Idoma nation, part of the Yala LGA's subgroups are the Igede-speaking people believed to have migrated from the Oju part of Benue State, who migrated from Ora, in Edo North.

In Cross River North, Bekwarra is one of the most widely spoken languages. It is understood by other tribes in the district. This language along with Efik and Ejagham is used for news broadcast on the state-owned radio and TV stations.

Cross River State epitomizes the nation's linguistic and cultural plurality and, in spite of the diversity of dialects, all the Indigenous languages in the state have common linguistic roots as Niger-Congo languages. Finally, the State serves as the venue of the largest carnival in Africa.

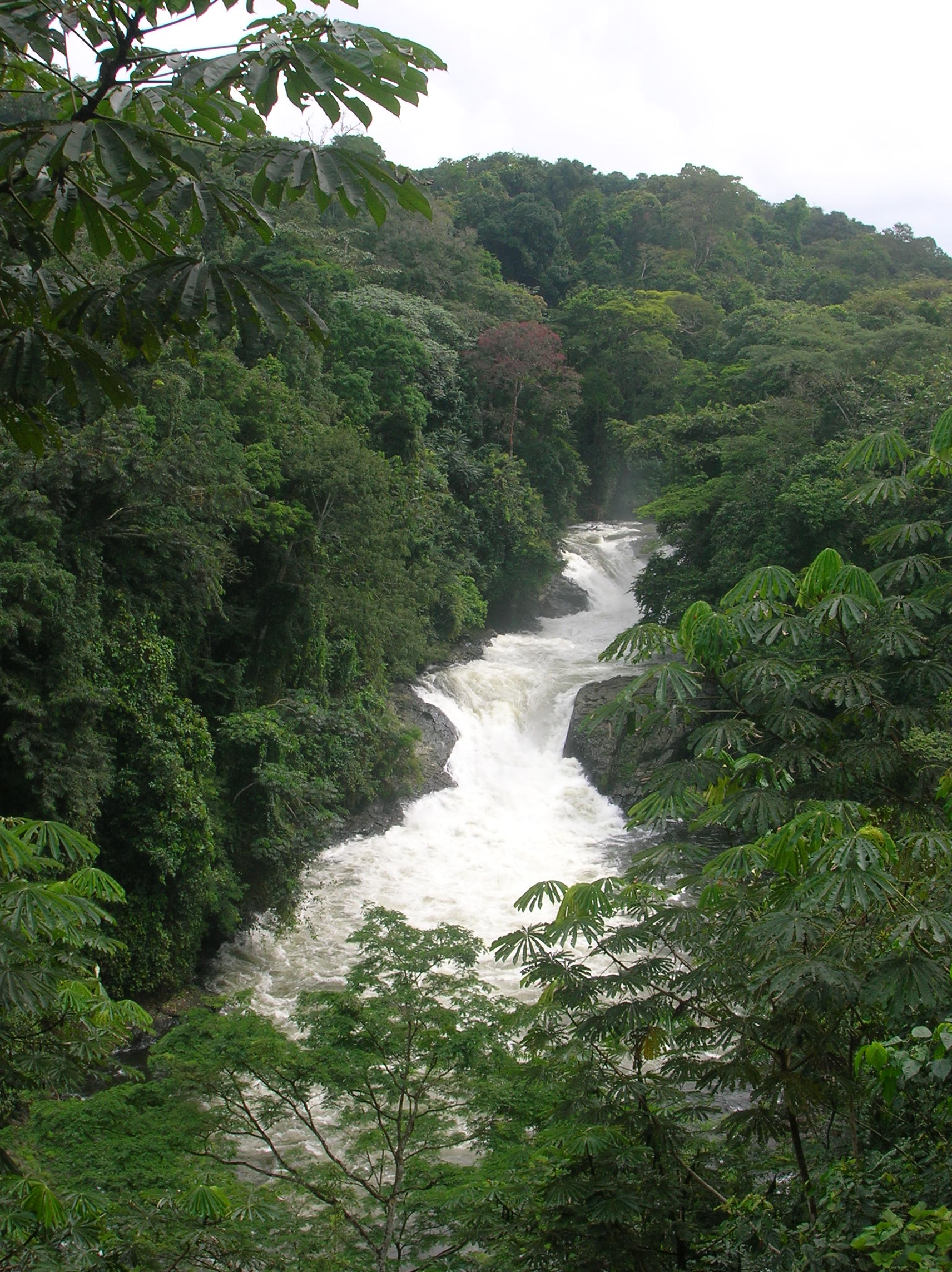
Kwa falls, a waterfall along the Kwa River

== Local Government Areas ==
Cross River State consists of eighteen (18) Local Government Areas. They are:

- Abi
- Akamkpa
- Akpabuyo
- Bekwarra
- Bakassi
- Biase
- Boki
- Calabar Municipal
- Calabar South
- Etung
- Ikom
- Obanliku
- Obubra
- Obudu
- Odukpani
- Ogoja
- Yakurr
- Yala

== Religion ==
The majority of Cross Riverians are predominantly Christian with minorities practicing different ethnic indigenous religions.
The Catholic Church includes the Archdiocese of Calabar with 51 parishes under Archbishop Joseph Effiong Ekuwem and the suffragan Diocese of Ogoja with 79 parishes under Bishop Donatus Edet Akpan. The Anglican Province of the Niger Delta includes the Diocese of Calabar led by Bishop Nneoyi O. Egbe.

== Languages ==
Languages of Cross River State listed by LGA includes :

LGA	Languages
Abi	Agwagwune; Humono
Akamkpa	Agoi; Bakpinka; Doko-Uyanga; Efik; Lubila; Nkukoli; Ukpet-Ehom; Ejagham; Kiong; Korop; Ubaghara; Ukwa; Umon
Bekwarra	Bekwarra; Tiv; Utugwang-Irungene-Afrike
Biase	Agwagwune; Efik; Ubaghara; Ukwa; Umon
Boki	Bete-Bendi; Bokyi
Calabar	Efik; Ejagham
Ikom	Ejagham; Abanyom; Bukpe; Efutop; Mbembe; Nde-Nsele-Nta; Ndoe; Nkukoli; Nnam; Olulumo-Ikom; Yala
Obanliku	Bete-Bendi; Evant; Iceve-Maci; Obanliku; Otank; Tiv
Obubra	Agoi; Hohumono; Lenyima; Leyigha; Lokaa; Mbembe; Nkukoli; Yala
Obudu	Bete-Bendi; Bukpe; Bumaji; Elege; Tiv; Ubang; Utugwang-Irungene-Afrike;
Odukpani	Efik; Ejagham; Kiong;
Ogoja	Ekajuk; Igede; Kukele; Mbe; Nkem-Nkum; Nnam; Utugwang-Irungene-Afrike; Uzekwe;
Yakurr	Lokaah, Lokoi, Loseka, Loyima
Yala	Tiv; Mbembe; Igede; Yace; Yala; Kukelle
Akpabuyo	Efik; Ekoi
Bakassi	Efik

Other languages spoken in Cross State are Eki, Ibibio, Ilue, Ito, and Okobo.

== Festivals ==
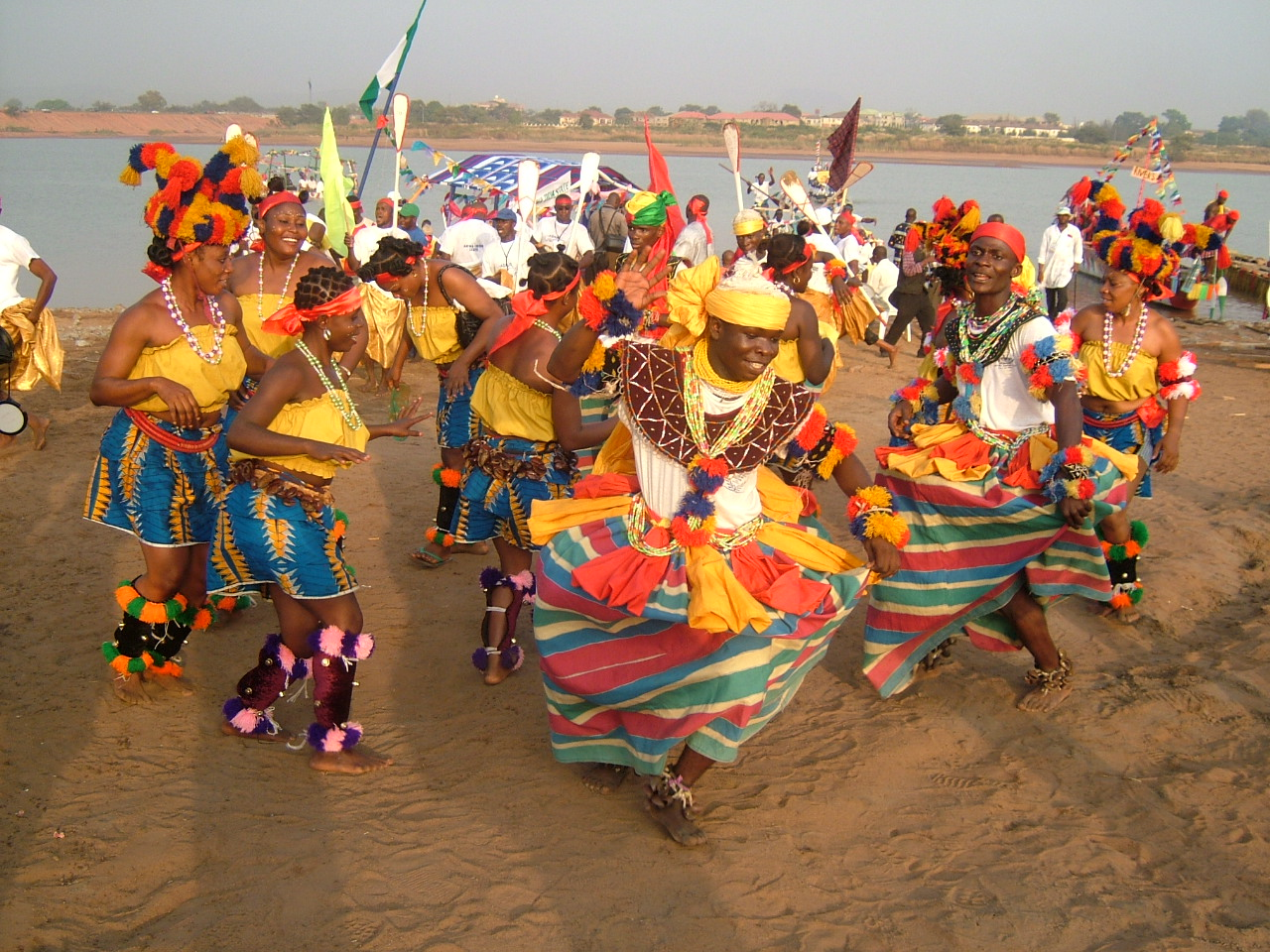
Dance Troupe at Cross River State

Festivals held in Cross River state include:

- The Cross River State Christmas Festival – 1 December to 31 December annually
- The Cross River State Carnival Float – 26 and 27 December yearly
- The Yakurr Leboku Yam festival – 28 August annually
- The Calabar Boat Regata
- Anong Bahumono Festival which is held in Anong Village, during which different cultural dances are showcased, including Ikpobin (acclaimed to be the most entertaining dance in the state), Ekoi, Obam, Emukei and Eta
- Ediba Bahumono Festival which is held in Ediba Village every last Saturday in the month of July
- Bekwarra, Obudu, Igede New yam festival which is held every 1st Saturday of September every year.
- Obanliku New Yam Festival is celebrated every last Saturday of August every year.

== Tourism ==
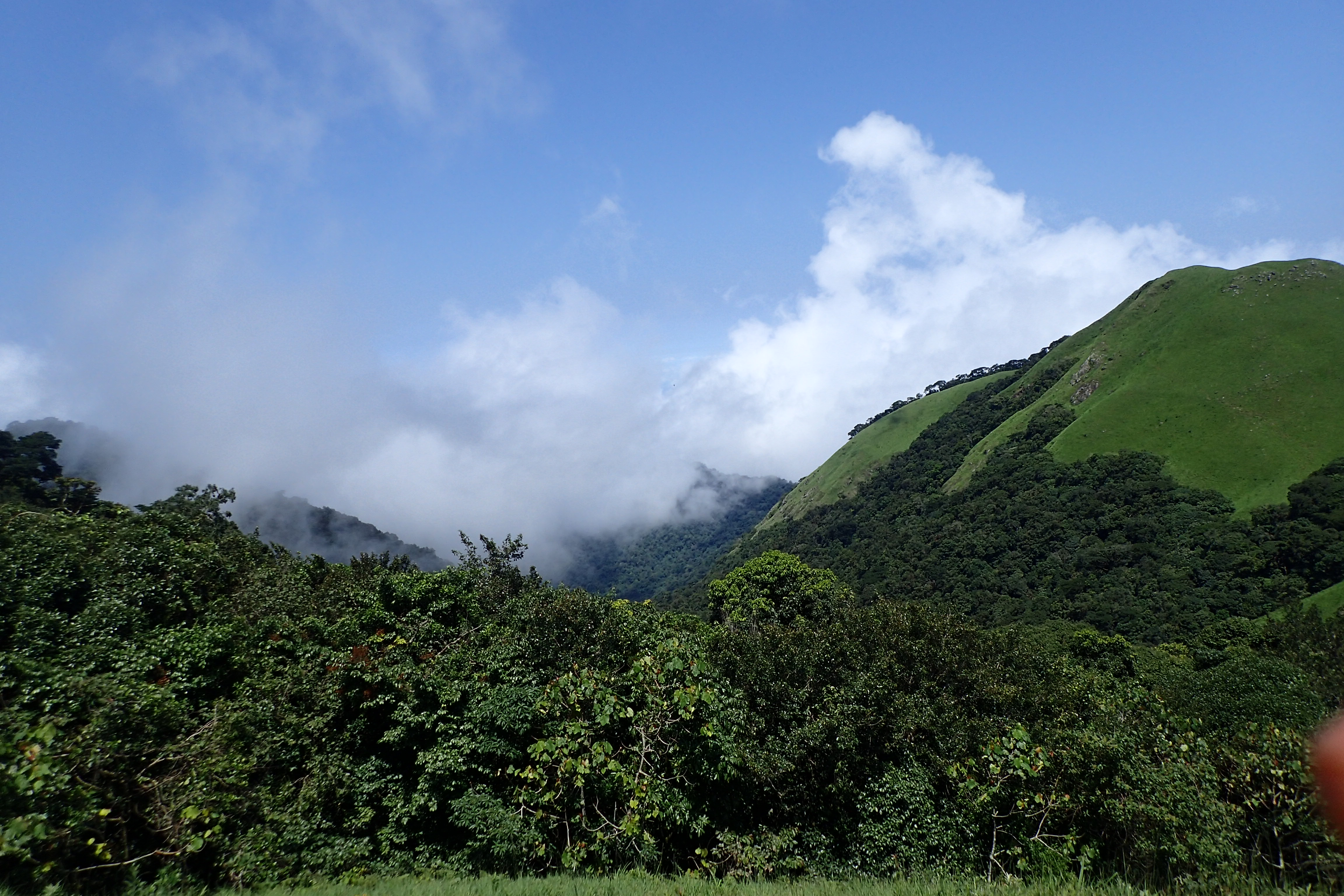
Cross River National Park

From the plateaus of the mountain tops of Obanliku to the Rain forests of Afi, from the Waterfalls of Agbokim and Kwa to the ox-bow Calabar River which provides sights and images of the Tinapa Business Resort, Marina Resort, Calabar Residency Museum and the Calabar Slave Park along its course, there is an eco-tourist visiting Cross River State.

Other tourist attractions are the Ikom Monoliths (a series of volcanic-stone monoliths of unknown age), the Mary Slessor Tomb, Calabar Drill Monkey Sanctuary, Cross River National Park, Afi Mountain walkway canopy, Kwa Falls, Agbokim waterfalls, Tinapa Business Resort, Mono railway and the annual Calabar Carnival that takes place during the Christmas period.

Cross River State can be accessed by air through the Margaret Ekpo International Airport at Calabar. There are daily flights to Calabar from Lagos and Abuja serviced by airlines such as Air peace Airlines, Ibom Air Airlines, and recently Cally Air.

== Education ==
Education started with mother tongue education. Presently, a lot of schools in the state for educative learning in the society. The Tertiary educational institutions in the State includes:

- University of Calabar,
- University of Cross River State (UNICROSS)
- College of Health Technology, Calabar
- CRS College of Nursing Sciences, Calabar
- Ibrahim Babangida College of Agriculture, Obubra
- University of Education and Entrepreneurial Studies, Cross River State located, Akamkpa
- Federal College of Education, Obudu
- Polytechnic Ugep, Yakurr
- Arthur Jarvis University, Akpabuyo

== Transportation ==
Federal highways

- A4 north from Calabar via Ikom and Ogoja to Benue State,
- A343 (as part of TAH8: Trans-African Highway 8 Lagos-Mombasa) west from A4 at Mbok Junction as the Ngulya Mbok Rd and Iyahe Rd to Ebonyi State as the Ogoja-Abakaliki Rd,
- A4-1 west from A4 at Odukpani Junction as the Ndom Nkim Esuk Odot Rd west across Cross River at Ayadeghe to Akwa Ibom.

Two roads to Cameroon:

- Trans-African Highway 8 from A4 at Ikum via Mfum at Ekok to N6 to Mamfé.
- The Calabar-Ikom road from Ekang to Otu.

Other major roads include:

- the Oju-Alebo Rd north from A343 at Iyahe to Benue State as the Iyahe-Ewango-Oju Rd,
- the Ikum Wula Rd northeast from A4 at Ikom as the Obudu-Ikom Rd to Obudu,
- the Ranch Rd east from Obudu as the Vande Ikya-Abanliko Rd and the Akanliko-Ngale Rd,
- the Amachi-Ndeokpai Rd west from A4 at Ndeokpai across Cross River by ferry at Ikot Okpora to Abia State at Ewe as the Arochukwu-Akampa-Odukpani-Calabar Rd.

Waterways:

Calabar is a major port, with navigable waterways on Cross River.

Airports: Margaret Ekpo International Airport at Calabar (1983), and Bebi Airstrip.

== Politics ==
The state government is led by a democratically elected governor who works closely with members of the state house of assembly. The capital city of the state is Calabar.

=== Electoral system ===
The governor of each state is selected using a modified two-round system. To be elected in the first round, a candidate must receive the plurality of the vote and over 25% of the vote in at least two -third of the State local government Areas. If no candidate passes threshold, a second round will be held between the top candidate and the next candidate to have received a plurality of votes in the highest number of local government Areas.

== See also ==
- Akwa Akpa
- Cross River language
- Tinapa Resort
