= 2023 Cross River State gubernatorial election =

2023 gubernatorial election in Cross River State, Nigeria

- 18 March 2023
- Registered: 1,766,466
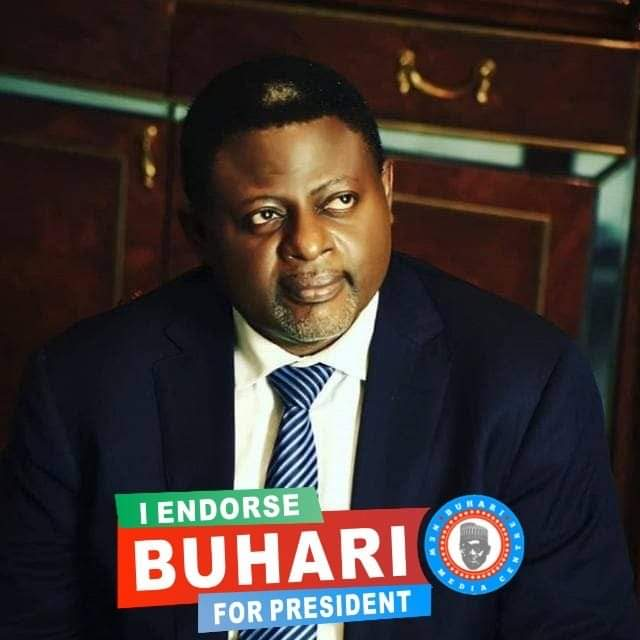
		PDP
Nominee	Bassey Otu	Sandy Ojang Onor
Party	APC	PDP
Running mate	Peter Odey	Emana Ambrose-Amawhe
Popular vote	258,619	179,636
Percentage	57.23%	39.75%
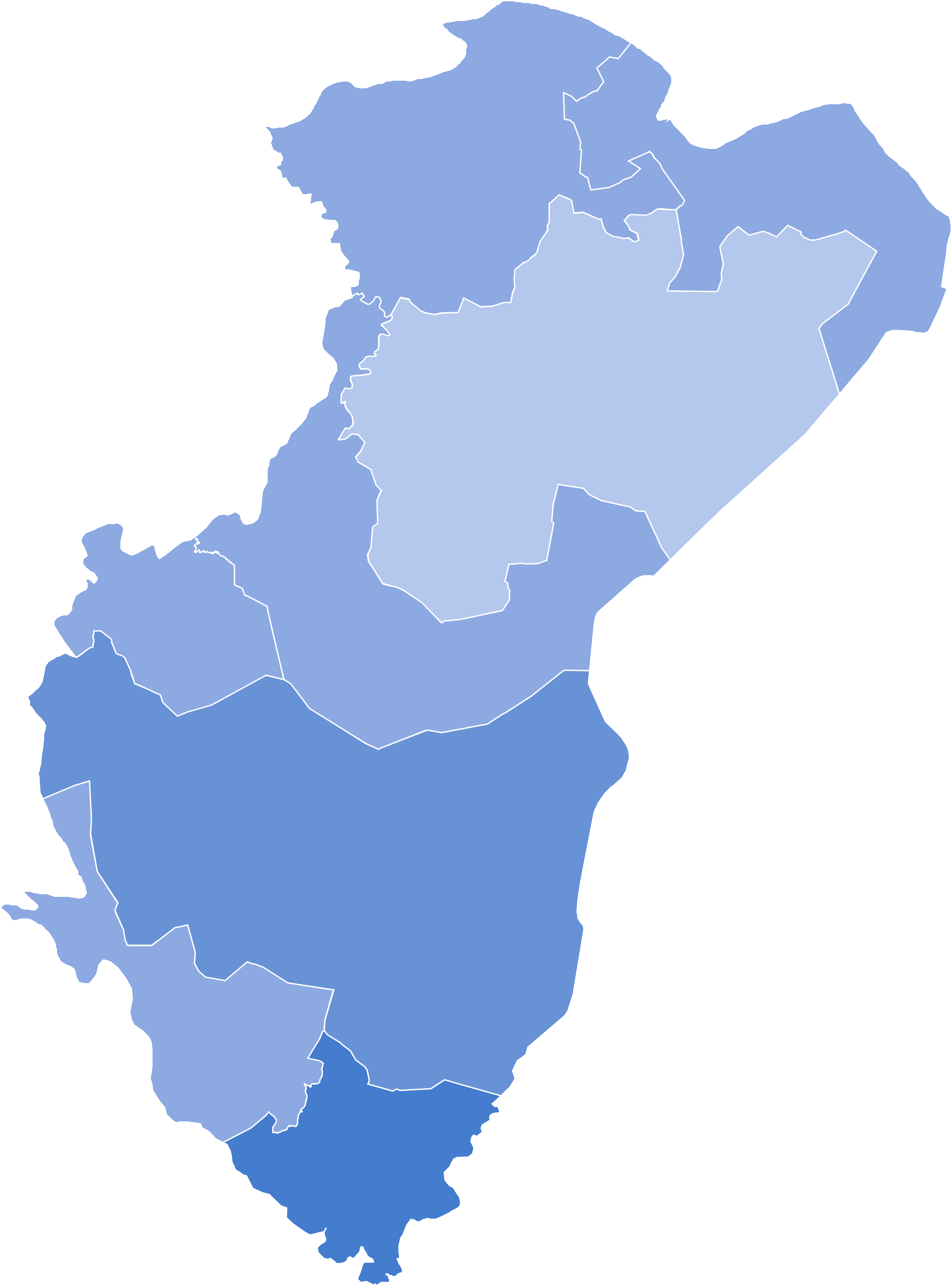
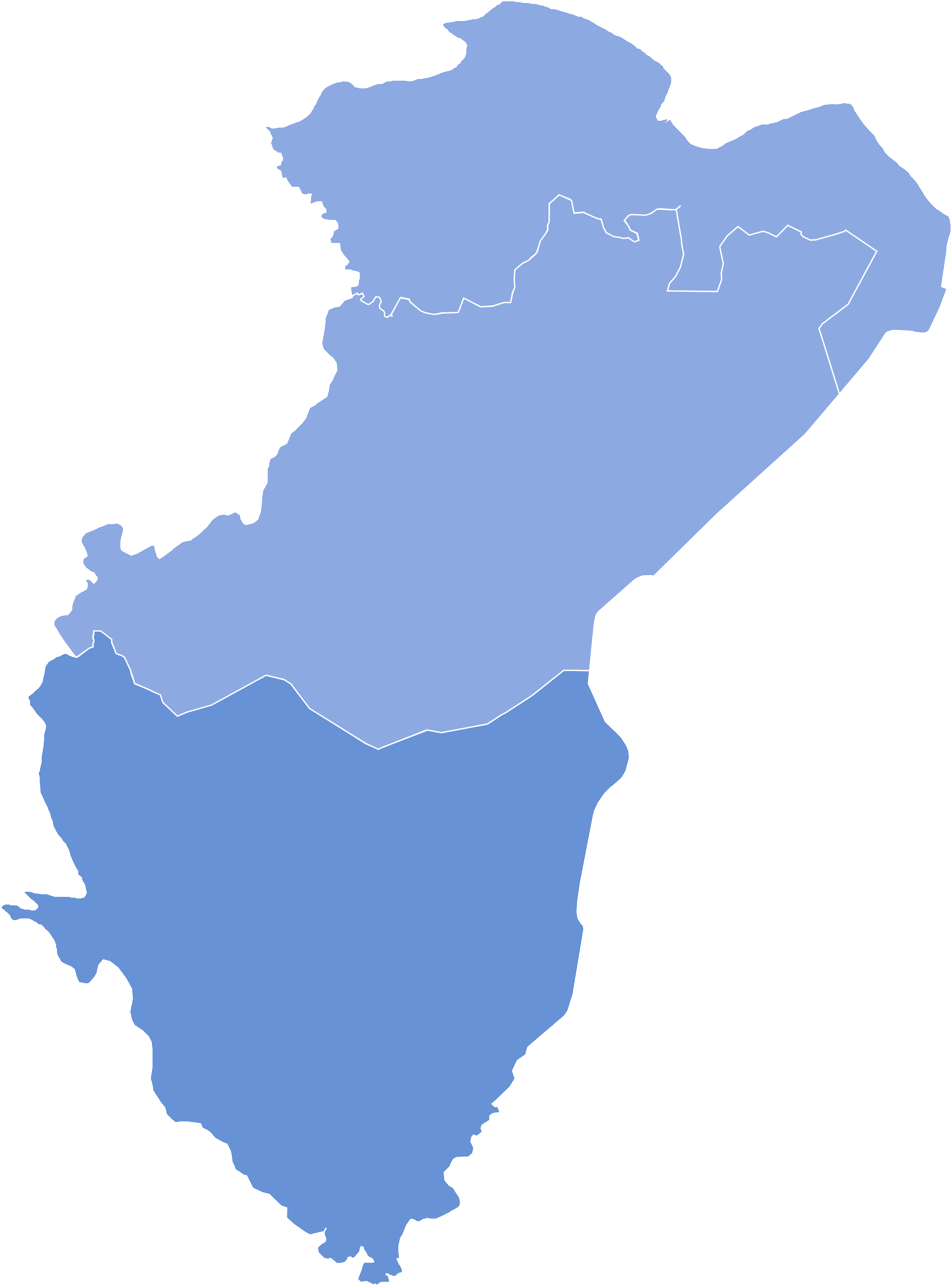
- LGA results Otu: 40–50% 50–60% 60–70% 70–80% 80–90% Onor: 40–50% 50–60%
Governor before election
Benedict Ayade
APC
Elected Governor
Bassey Otu
APC

The 2023 Cross River State gubernatorial election was held on 18 March 2023, to elect the Governor of Cross River State, concurrent with elections to the Cross River State House of Assembly as well as twenty-seven other gubernatorial elections and elections to all other state houses of assembly. The election — which was postponed from its original 11 March date — was held three weeks after the presidential election and National Assembly elections. Incumbent APC Governor Benedict Ayade was term-limited and could not seek re-election to a third term. Former Senator Bassey Otu held the office for the APC by a 17.5% margin over PDP nominee — Senator Sandy Ojang Onor.

Party primaries were scheduled for between 4 April and 9 June 2022 with the Peoples Democratic Party nominating Senator for Cross River Central Onor on 25 May while the All Progressives Congress nominated former Senator for Cross River South Otu on 26 May.

The day after the election, collation completed and INEC declared Otu as the victor. In the official totals, Otu won nearly 260,000 votes and 57% of the vote as runner-up Onor received just under 180,000 votes and 40% of the vote. However, Onor rejected the results and filed legal challenges, eventually reaching the Supreme Court which affirmed Otu's victory in January 2024.

== Electoral system ==
The governor of Cross River State is elected using a modified two-round system. To be elected in the first round, a candidate must receive the plurality of the vote and over 25% of the vote in at least two-thirds of state local government areas. If no candidate passes this threshold, a second round will be held between the top candidate and the next candidate to have received a plurality of votes in the highest number of local government areas.

== Background ==
Cross River State is a diverse state in the South South with growing economy and vast natural areas but facing an underdeveloped yet vital agricultural sector, deforestation, and rising debt in large part due to years of systemic corruption.

Politically, the state's 2019 elections were categorized as a continuation of the PDP's control as Ayade won with over 73% of the vote and the party won every seat in the House of Assembly along with all three senate seats. However, the PDP did lose one House of Representatives seat to the APC and although the state was easily won by PDP presidential nominee Atiku Abubakar, it still swung towards Buhari compared to 2015 and had lower turnout. In the interim between 2019 and 2023, the state's political landscape drastically changed as Ayade defecting to the APC in May 2021 set in motion a wave of other defections that gave the APC control of the House of Assembly and half of the eight House of Representatives seats by mid-2022.

Ahead of his second term, Ayade stated focuses included the completion of in-progress projects and industrialization; however, he was routinely criticized for authoritarian-esque actions. Alarms were raised after Ayade's defection when he withheld the salaries of state and local officeholders that refused to defect with him and forcibly converted the state PDP secretariat into the new APC headquarters but the allegations of dictatorial actions were at their peak around his ordered arrests and months-long imprisonments of a critic and a journalist. At other points during his administration, Ayade was given praise for allocating large parts of the budget to capital expenditures while receiving further criticism for covering up COVID-19 cases, abandoning in-progress projects for new potential white elephants like the Calas Vegas resort project and the new Obudu Airport, creating several new ministries and appointing dozens of aides, getting an unapproved foreign loan in secret without evidence of use for the money, and continuing efforts to build a six-lane superhighway through the ecologically vital Cross River National Park.

== Primary elections ==
The primaries, along with any potential challenges to primary results, were to take place between 4 April and 3 June 2022 but the deadline was extended to 9 June. An informal zoning gentlemen's agreement set the Cross River South Senatorial District to have the next governor as Cross River South has not held the governorship since 2007. Neither major party closed their primaries to non-South candidates, as both the APC and PDP had heated internal debates over zoning to the Southern district. While the APC ended up nominating someone from the South, the PDP chose someone from the Central district.

=== All Progressives Congress ===
Arguments over zoning divided the state APC ahead of the primary as Ayade publicly advocated for his successor to come from the South while prospective candidates from other regions like former Senator John Owan Enoh and former minister Usani Uguru Usani argued for the primary to be kept open. In April 2022, state party chairman Alphonsus Eba stated that the primary would be kept open to candidates from all parts of the state, insisting that Ayade's view was simply his personal opinion. However, in early May, Eba announced a party committee to narrow the number of candidates from 17 to four—as two candidates were to be from the South and two candidates were to be from the Central, the party nomination was effectively zoned to the Central and Southern districts. Though, this arrangement was also scrapped amid internal turmoil that led the party to choose a single informal "consensus" candidate—former Senator Bassey Otu. However, fellow candidates Chris Agara and John Owan Enoh rejected the arrangement and continued their campaigns while Usani left the party to run under the PRP. The apparent final blow to the "consensus" arrangement was Otu's reported disqualification from contesting the primary as it was reported on 20 May that the APC screening panel barred Otu due to his questionable educational qualifications and a fraud conviction from 1987. However, the panel announced that it had not disqualified Otu but preliminarily declared his case "inconclusive" due to the absence of certain credentials. Then the consensus arrangement received another lifeline as Owan Enoh withdrew and endorsed Otu.

On 20 April 2022, the APC National Executive Committee announced the party's schedule for gubernatorial primaries, setting its expression of interest form price at ₦10 million and nomination form price at ₦40 million with a 50% nomination form discount for candidates younger than 40 while women and candidates with disabilities get free nomination forms. Forms were to be sold from 26 April to 6 May until the deadline was later extended to 10 May then 12 May. After the submission of nomination forms by 13 May, candidates were screened by a party committee on 14 and 15 May while 16 May was the date for the screening appeal process. Ward congresses and LGA congresses were set for between 7 and 9 May to elect delegates for the primary. Candidates approved by the screening process advanced to a primary set for 26 May, in concurrence with other APC gubernatorial primaries; challenges to the result could be made the next day.

As the consensus arrangement reformed, a number of other candidates dropped out in favor of Oti leading to the primary day, when an indirect primary ended in Otu emerging as the APC nominee after results showed him winning over 84% of the delegates' votes. In his acceptance speech, Otu thanked the party and his former opponents while pledging to continue the work of the Ayade administration. However, controversy emerged afterwards when Owan Enoh surprisingly reversed position and filed an appeal petition against Otu in reference to the dispute over his educational qualifications. Despite the ongoing lawsuit, Otu commenced a general election campaign which was dominated by the search for a running mate in the weeks after the primary, with party members desiring regional balance in the ticket. To achieve this balance, Peter Odey—MHA for Ogoja—was chosen as the deputy gubernatorial nominee on 9 August at an unveiling rally in Ogoja. A Federal High Court ruling dismissed Owan Enoh's lawsuit in late October 2022 with Justice Ijeoma Ojukwu finding that primary candidate qualification screening was the purview of political parties. Initially Owan Enoh appealed the ruling but he announced its withdrawal in December due to personal overtures from APC presidential nominee Bola Tinubu.

==== Nominated ====
- Bassey Otu: 2019 APC Cross River South senatorial nominee, former Senator for Cross River South (2011–2015), and former House of Representatives member for Calabar Municipal/Odukpani (2003–2011)
  - Running mate—Peter Odey: House of Assembly member for Ogoja

==== Eliminated in primary ====
- Chris Agara: businessman

==== Withdrew ====
- Ben Akak: businessman
- Asuquo Ekpenyong: Commissioner for Finance
- Bassey Ndem: former Commissioner for Lands
- Godswill Edward Osim: Governor Benedict Ayade aide and son-in-law of former President Goodluck Jonathan
- John Owan Enoh: former Senator for Cross River Central (2015–2019) and 2019 APC gubernatorial nominee
- Usani Uguru Usani: former Minister for Niger Delta Affairs (2015–2019), 2019 APC gubernatorial candidate, Cross River State APC Chairman (2014–2015), 2012 ACN gubernatorial nominee, and former commissioner (defected prior to the primary to successfully run in the PRP gubernatorial primary)

==== Declined ====
- Goddy Jedy Agba: Minister of State for Power (2019–present)
- Okonkon Effiom: Commissioner for Rural Transformation
- Edem Effiom Ekong: Governor Ayade aide, former Commissioner for Local Government Affairs, and former Commissioner for Lands
- Hilliard Eta: former National APC Vice Chairman
- Eyo Etim Nyong: physician and former member of the board of the Niger Delta Development Commission

==== Results ====
Candidates' vote share
1. Bassey Otu (84.7%)
2. John Owan Enoh (8.77%)
3. Chris Agara (6.58%)

APC primary results
Party	Candidate	Votes	%
APC	Bassey Otu	811	84.65%
APC	John Owan Enoh (withdrawn)	84	8.77%
APC	Chris Agara	63	6.58%
Total votes		958	100.00%
Invalid or blank votes		1	N/A
Turnout		959	Unknown

=== People's Democratic Party ===
Ahead of the primary, rumours that former Governor Donald Duke was attempting to impose Arthur Jarvis Archibong as the party nominee led to protests from other candidates. When Duke held a meeting to find an informal "consensus" Southern candidate in early May 2022, Archibong emerged as the choice leading to further accusations of imposition as other candidates rejected the arrangement.

On 16 March 2022, the national PDP announced its gubernatorial primaries' schedule, setting its expression of interest form price at ₦1 million and the nomination form price at ₦20 million with a 50% discount for candidates between 25 and 30. Forms were to be sold until 1 April but the party later extended the deadline four times before reaching a final deadline of 22 April. After the submission of nomination forms by 25 April, candidates were screened by a party committee on 28 April while 2 May was the rescheduled date for the screening appeal process. Ward congresses were set for 29 April and LGA congresses were rescheduled for 10 May to elect delegates for the primary. Candidates approved by the screening process advanced to a primary set for 25 May, in concurrence with all other PDP gubernatorial primaries; challenges to the result could be made in the following days.

On the primary date, the election ended with Senator Sandy Ojang Onor emerging as the PDP nominee after results showed him winning by a margin of about 10%. Runner-up Gershom Bassey accepted the results and congratulated Onor while noting that Southern candidates got a majority of votes cast. On 4 July, Onor announced Emana Ambrose-Amawhe—a former Channels TV presenter—as his running mate in a speech that pointed out that Ambrose-Amawhe would become Cross River's first women deputy governor in 30 years.

==== Nominated ====
- Sandy Ojang Onor: Senator for Cross River Central (2019–present), former Commissioner for Environment (2012–2013), former Commissioner for Agriculture (2010–2011), and former Etung Local Government Chairman (1999–2002)
  - Running mate—Emana Ambrose-Amawhe: former news presenter

==== Eliminated in primary ====
- Arthur Jarvis Archibong: Chancellor of Arthur Jarvis University
- Daniel Effiong Asuquo: House of Representatives member for Akamkpa/Biase (2011–present), former Director-General of the Cross River State Electrification Agency (2008–2010), and former Akamkpa Local Government Chairman (1999–2002)
- Gershom Bassey: Senator for Cross River South (2015–present) and former Chairman of the Cross River State Water Board (1999–2014)
- Mkpang Coco-Bassey: engineer
- Eyo Ekpo-Ene
- Philia Henshaw
- Imah Nsa Adegoke: 2012 LP gubernatorial nominee
- Nkoyo Toyo: former House of Representatives member for Calabar Municipal/Odukpani

==== Withdrew ====
- Wilfred Bonse: businessman
- Efiok Cobham: former Deputy Governor

==== Declined ====
- Essien Ekpenyong Ayi: House of Representatives member for Akpabuyo/Bakassi/Calabar South (2003–present) and former Calabar South Local Government Chairman (1995–2002)
- Ita Ekpeyong: former Director of the State Security Service (2010–2015)
- Ntufam Ekpo Okon: 2019 APC deputy gubernatorial nominee and former House of Representatives member for Calabar Municipal/Odukpani

==== Results ====
Candidates' vote share
1. Sandy Ojang Onor (41.3%)
2. Gershom Bassey (30.6%)
3. Daniel Effiong Asuquo (25.7%)
4. Other candidates (2.28%)

PDP primary results
Party	Candidate	Votes	%
PDP	Sandy Ojang Onor	236	41.33%
PDP	Gershom Bassey	175	30.65%
PDP	Daniel Effiong Asuquo	147	25.74%
PDP	Arthur Jarvis Archibong	6	1.05%
PDP	Nkoyo Toyo	4	0.70%
PDP	Other candidates	3	0.53%
Total votes		571	100.00%
Invalid or blank votes		20	N/A
Turnout		591	Unknown

=== Minor parties ===
- Effiom Effiom Ekeng (Action Alliance)
  - Running mate: Oguda Epam Obongha
- Marikana Stanley Ibiang (Action Democratic Party)
  - Running mate: Francis Ayi Ukpanyang
- Edet Effiom (Action Peoples Party)
  - Running mate: Major Umoh Lewis
- Effa Effiong Nyong (African Democratic Congress)
  - Running mate: Christabel Mfam Kasang
- Ogar Obu (Labour Party)
  - Running mate: Ekpezu Obu Ekpezu
- Patrick Henry Solomon (National Rescue Movement)
  - Running mate: Mathias Amagbah
- Usani Uguru Usani (People's Redemption Party)
  - Running mate: Arit Bassey Nsan
- Edet Okokon (Social Democratic Party)
  - Running mate: Obo Daniel
- Joseph Coco-Bassey (Young Progressives Party)
  - Running mate: Prince Agbor Onyi

== Campaign ==
As the general election campaign began in June 2022, pundits focused on the major candidates' attempts to reconcile aggrieved members of their own parties in the wake of the party primaries. While Otu's qualifications were disputed by his intraparty opponents, the catalyst for internal anti-Onor sentiment within the PDP was his disregard for the zoning principle by running. At the commencement of the official campaign period in October, analysts again reiterated the significance of zoning as a campaign issue with the potential that an Onor victory could mean the end of the practice in the state's gubernatorial elections; observers also noted Ayade's support of Otu and Onor's strong oratory skills as further campaign factors. However, the national PDP crisis between the G5 group and the party presidential nominee Atiku Abubakar impacted the Cross River PDP as well, splitting it between G5-aligned and Abubakar-aligned blocs. Onor and the state party chairman led the G5-aligned bloc while the Abubakar-aligned faction was helmed by former Governor Liyel Imoke; by January 2023, observers noted that Onor advertising did not jointly support Abubakar while Abubakar advertising did not mention Onor's gubernatorial candidacy. The next month, focus switched to the presidential election on 25 February. In the election, Cross River State voted for Peter Obi (LP); Obi won the state with 43.2% of the vote, beating Bola Tinubu (APC) at 31.3% and Atiku Abubakar (PDP) at 22.9%. In the wake of the presidential race, pundits focused on regional differences in the gubernatorial election in addition to the rise of minor candidates and Ayade's senatorial loss.

== Projections ==
Source	Projection	As of
Africa Elects (Note: AfricaElects projections predict the likelihood of a candidate winning a state by categorizing a state as "Safe" for exceedingly likely, "Likely" for somewhat likely, and "Lean" for least likely. If no clear determination could be made, states are categorized as "tossups".)	Lean Onor	17 March 2023
Enough is Enough- SBM Intelligence (Note: EiE-SBM projections predict which candidates will win states.)	Onor	2 March 2023

== Conduct ==
=== Electoral timetable ===
On 26 February 2022, the Independent National Electoral Commission released the timetable, setting out key dates and deadlines for the election. Months later on 27 May 2022, INEC made a slight revision to the timetable, allowing parties extra time to conduct primaries.

- 28 February 2022 – Publication of Notice of Election
- 4 April 2022 – First day for the conduct of party primaries
- 9 June 2022 (Note: The original deadline was 3 June; however, INEC pushed it back to 9 June at the behest of parties.) – Final day for the conduct of party primaries, including the resolution of disputes arising from them
- 1 July 2022 – First day for submission of nomination forms to INEC via the online portal
- 15 July 2022 – Final day for submission of nomination forms to INEC via the online portal
- 12 October 2022 – Commencement of the official campaign period
- 16 March 2023 (Note: The original deadline was 9 March; however, INEC pushed it back to 16 March.) – Final day of the official campaign period

== General election ==
=== Results ===
Candidates' vote share
1. Bassey Otu (APC) (57.2%)
2. Sandy Ojang Onor (PDP) (39.8%)
3. Other candidates (3.03%)

2023 Cross River State gubernatorial election
Party	Candidate	Votes	%
AA	Effiom Effiom Ekeng		
ADP	Marikana Stanley Ibiang		
APP	Edet Effiom		
ADC	Effa Effiong Nyong		
APC	Bassey Otu		
LP	Ogar Obu		
NRM	Patrick Henry Solomon		
PDP	Sandy Ojang Onor		
PRP	Usani Uguru Usani		
SDP	Epet Okokon		
YPP	Joseph Coco-Bassey		
Total votes			100.00%
Turnout			

==== By senatorial district ====
The results of the election by senatorial district.

Senatorial District	Bassey Otu APC		Sandy Ojang Onor PDP		Others		Total Valid Votes
Senatorial District	Votes	Percentage	Votes	Percentage	Votes	Percentage	Total Valid Votes
Cross River Central Senatorial District (Note: Comprising the local government areas of Abi, Boki, Etung, Ikom, Obubra, and Yakurr.)	76,359	52.36%	63,569	43.59%	5,899	4.05%	145,827
Cross River North Senatorial District (Note: Comprising the local government areas of Bekwarra, Obanliku, Obudu, Ogoja, and Yala.)	106,934	55.06%	81,980	42.21%	5,316	2.74%	194,230
Cross River South Senatorial District (Note: Comprising the local government areas of Akamkpa, Akpabuyo, Bakassi, Biase, Calabar Municipal, Calabar South, and Odukpani.)	84,206	61.65%	48,924	35.82%	3,452	2.53%	136,582
Totals	258,619	57.23%	179,636	39.75%	13,678	3.03%	451,933

Percentage of the vote won by each major candidate by district.

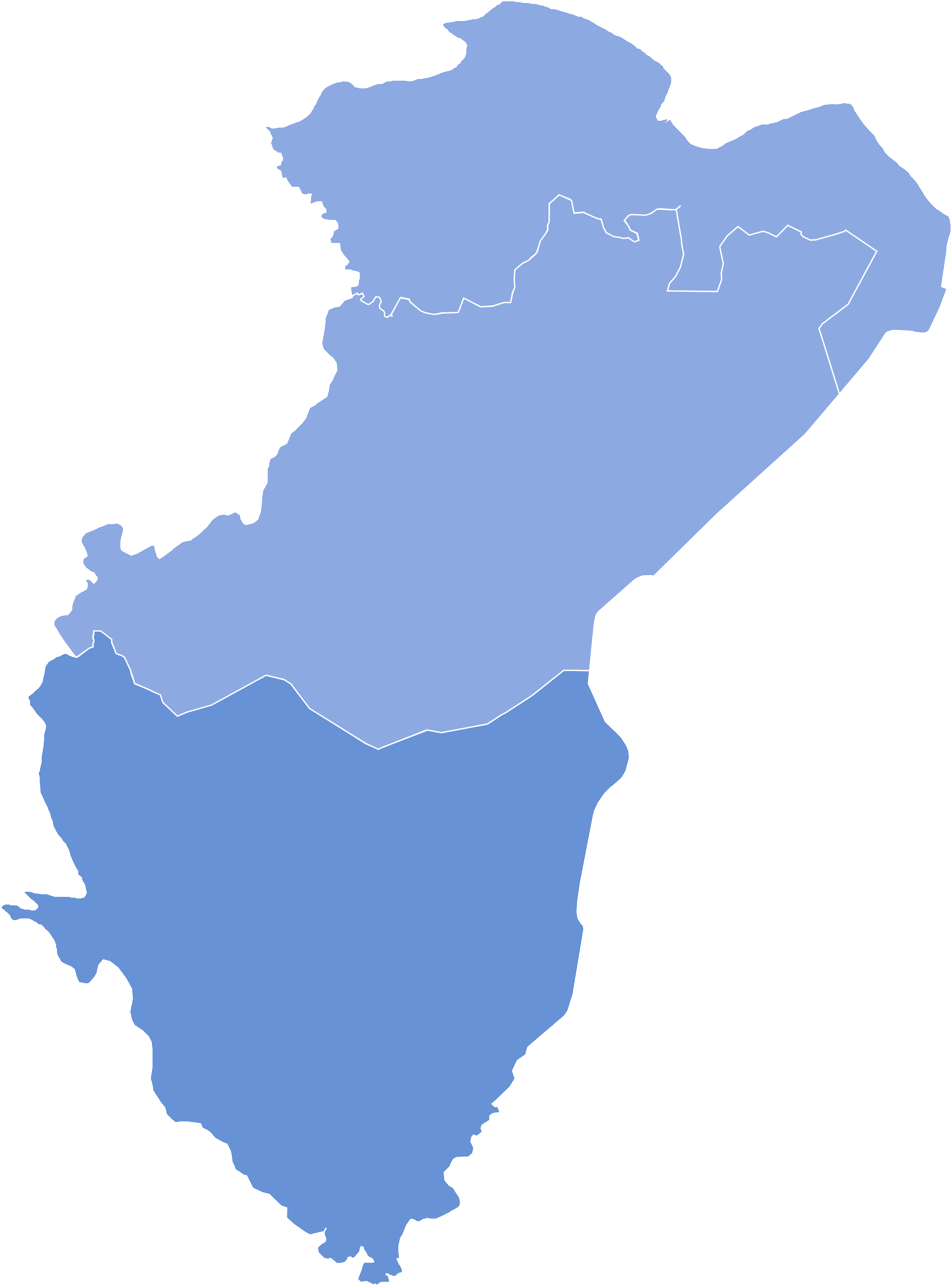
Otu; 50–60% 60–70%

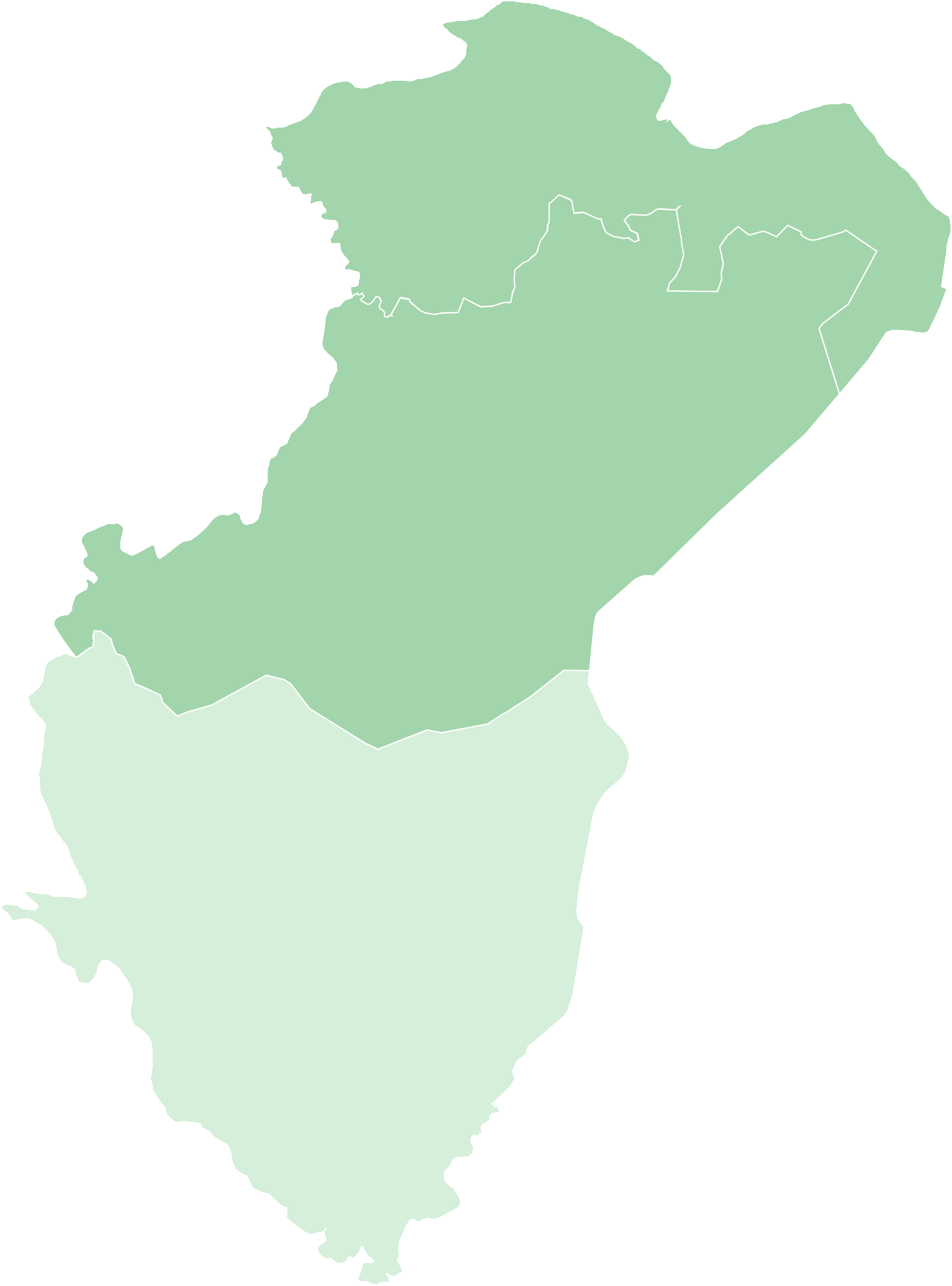
Onor; 30–40% 40–50%

==== By federal constituency ====
The results of the election by federal constituency.

Federal Constituency	Bassey Otu APC		Sandy Ojang Onor PDP		Others		Total Valid Votes
Federal Constituency	Votes	Percentage	Votes	Percentage	Votes	Percentage	Total Valid Votes
Abi/Yakurr Federal Constituency (Note: Comprising the local government areas of Abi and Yakurr.)	27,545	56.04%	18,024	36.67%	3,581	7.29%	49,150
Akamkpa/Biase Federal Constituency (Note: Comprising the local government areas of Akamkpa and Biase.)	22,155	60.17%	14,014	38.06%	649	1.76%	36,818
Akpabuyo/Bakassi/Calabar South Federal Constituency (Note: Comprising the local government areas of Akpabuyo, Bakassi, and Calabar South.)	40,382	72.02%	14,234	25.38%	1,458	2.60%	56,074
Calabar Municipal/Odukpani Federal Constituency (Note: Comprising the local government areas of Calabar Municipal and Odukpani.)	33,942	59.67%	19,853	34.90%	3,092	5.44%	56,887
Ikom/Boki Federal Constituency (Note: Comprising the local government areas of Boki and Ikom.)	30,238	49.78%	29,461	48.50%	1,048	1.73%	60,747
Obanliku/Obudu/Bekwarra Federal Constituency (Note: Comprising the local government areas of Bekwarra, Obanliku, and Obudu.)	43,824	54.43%	34,690	43.09%	1,994	2.48%	80,508
Obubra/Etung Federal Constituency (Note: Comprising the local government areas of Etung and Obubra.)	18,576	51.70%	16,084	44.76%	1,270	3.53%	35,930
Ogoja/Yala Federal Constituency (Note: Comprising the local government areas of Ogoja and Yala.)	40,955	53.25%	33,276	43.27%	2,673	3.48%	76,904
Totals	258,619	57.23%	179,636	39.75%	13,678	3.03%	451,933

Percentage of the vote won by each major candidate by constituency.

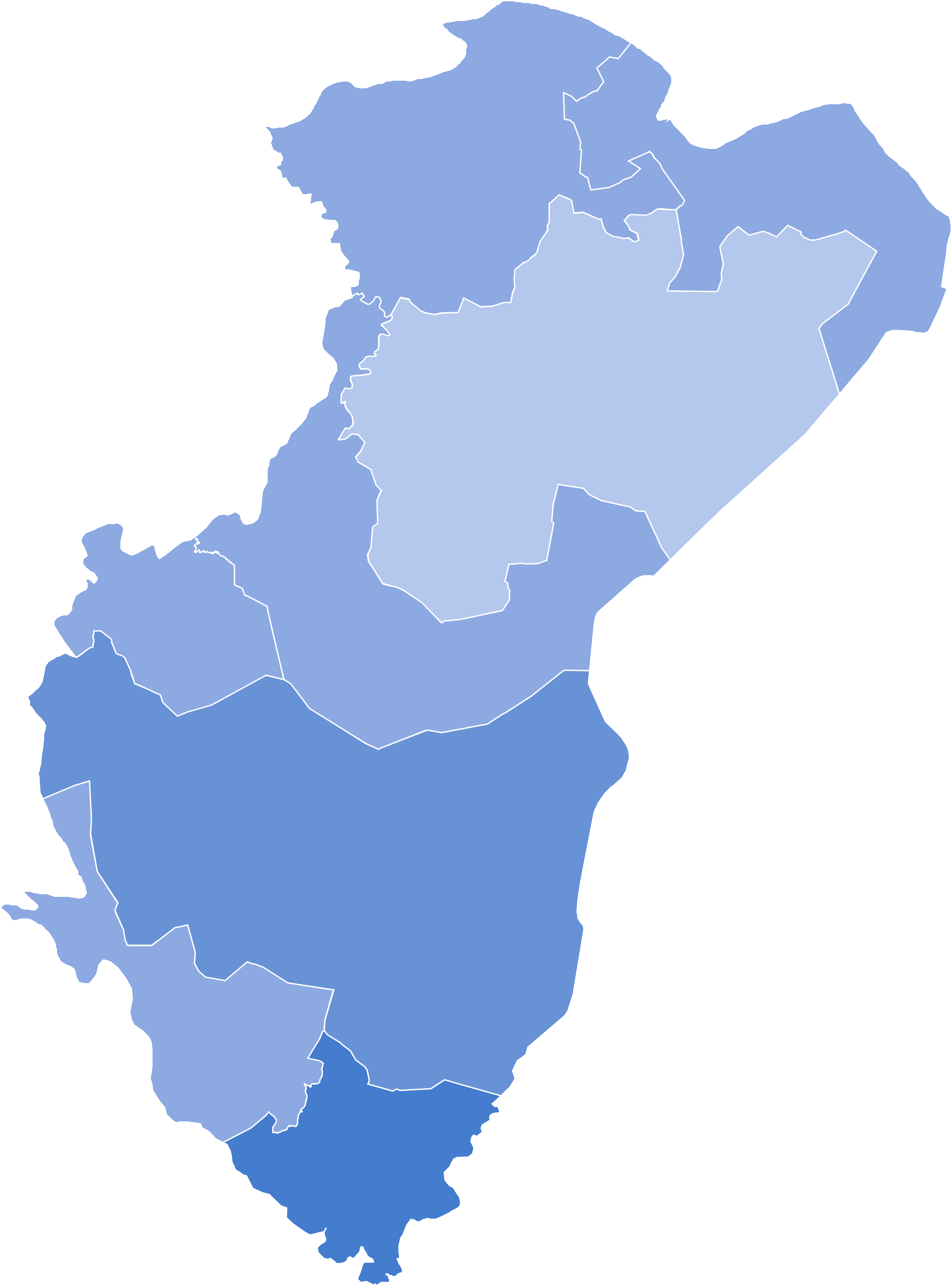
Otu; 40–50% 50–60% 60–70% 70–80%

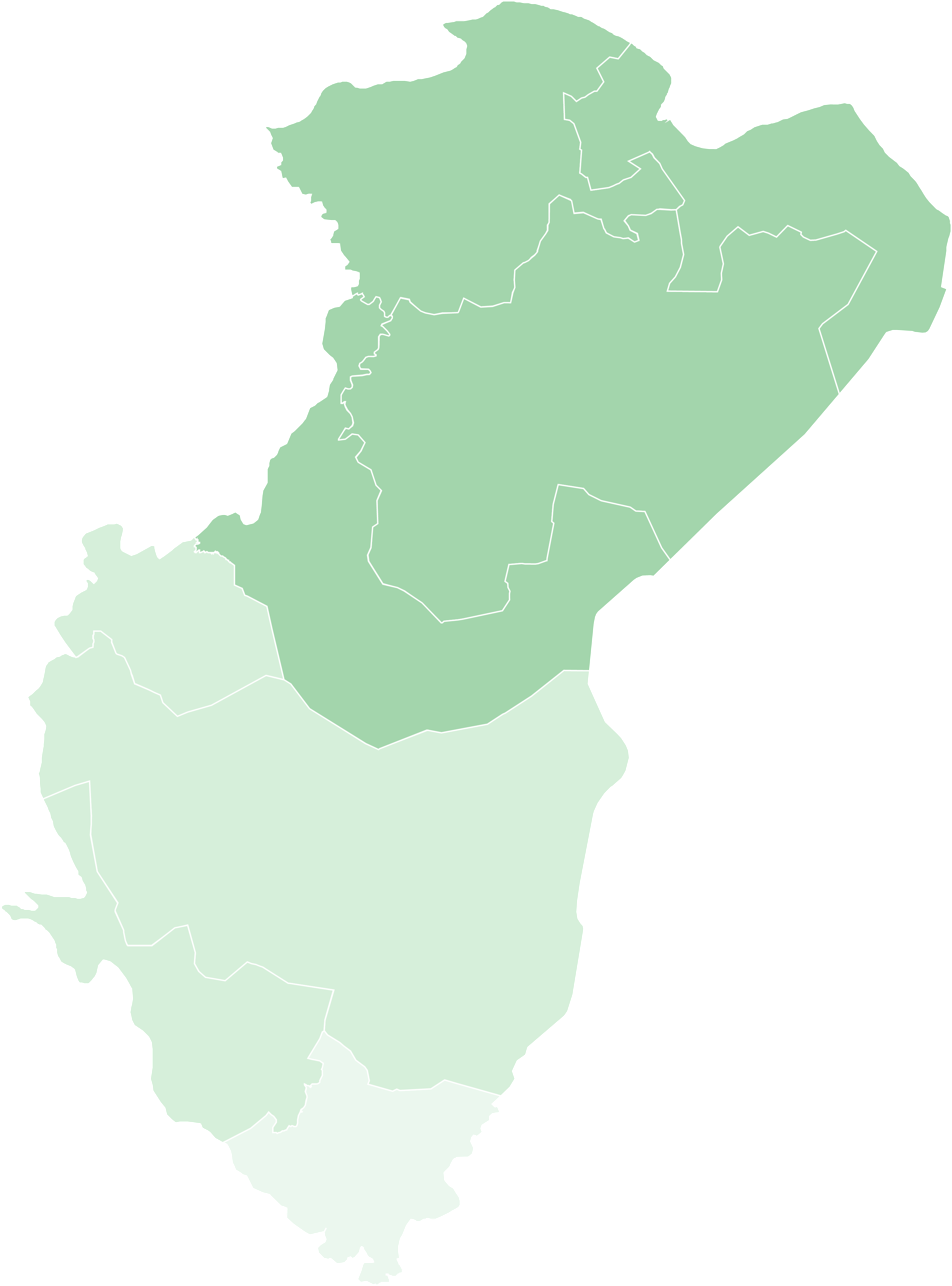
Onor <30% 30–40% 40–50%

== Legal challenges ==
Following the declaration of Bassey Otu as the winner, the Peoples Democratic Party (PDP) and its candidate, Sandy Ojang Onor, challenged the result at the Cross River State Governorship Election Petitions Tribunal. The tribunal dismissed the petition on 26 September 2023.

=== By local government area ===
The results of the election by local government area.

LGA	Bassey Otu APC		Sandy Ojang Onor PDP		Others		Total Valid Votes	Turnout Percentage
LGA	Votes	Percentage	Votes	Percentage	Votes	Percentage	Total Valid Votes	Turnout Percentage
Abi	9,861	51.00%	8,816	45.59%	659	3.41%	19,336	29.77%
Akamkpa	10,529	59.40%	6,935	39.12%	262	1.48%	17,726	19.13%
Akpabuyo	10,410	61.93%	5,938	35.33%	461	2.74%	16,809	27.34%
Bakassi	1,632	81.85%	316	15.85%	46	2.31%	1,994	12.54%
Bekwarra	11,839	48.17%	12,129	49.35%	611	2.49%	24,579	33.42%
Biase	11,626	60.89%	7,079	37.08%	387	2.03%	19,092	25.40%
Boki	17,355	52.31%	15,303	46.12%	520	1.57%	33,178	31.47%
Calabar Municipal	20,320	53.65%	15,882	41.93%	1,674	4.42%	37,876	20.01%
Calabar South	28,340	76.04%	7,980	21.41%	951	2.55%	37,271	22.42%
Etung	5,205	49.59%	5,139	48.96%	152	1.45%	10,496	24.34%
Ikom	12,883	46.73%	14,158	51.35%	528	1.92%	27,569	24.33%
Obanliku	10,386	50.39%	10,100	49.00%	125	0.61%	20,611	38.89%
Obubra	13,371	52.57%	10,945	43.03%	1,118	4.40%	25,434	24.15%
Obudu	21,599	61.16%	12,461	35.28%	1,258	3.56%	35,318	25.47%
Odukpani	13,622	71.65%	3,971	20.89%	1,418	7.46%	19,011	28.62%
Ogoja	16,162	47.57%	17,483	51.45%	1,418	0.98%	33,978	33.09%
Yakurr	17,684	59.31%	9,208	30.89%	2,922	9.80%	29,814	30.95%
Yala	24,793	59.26%	15,793	37.75%	1,255	3.00%	41,841	34.97%
Totals	258,619	57.23%	179,636	39.75%	13,678	3.03%	451,933	26.40%

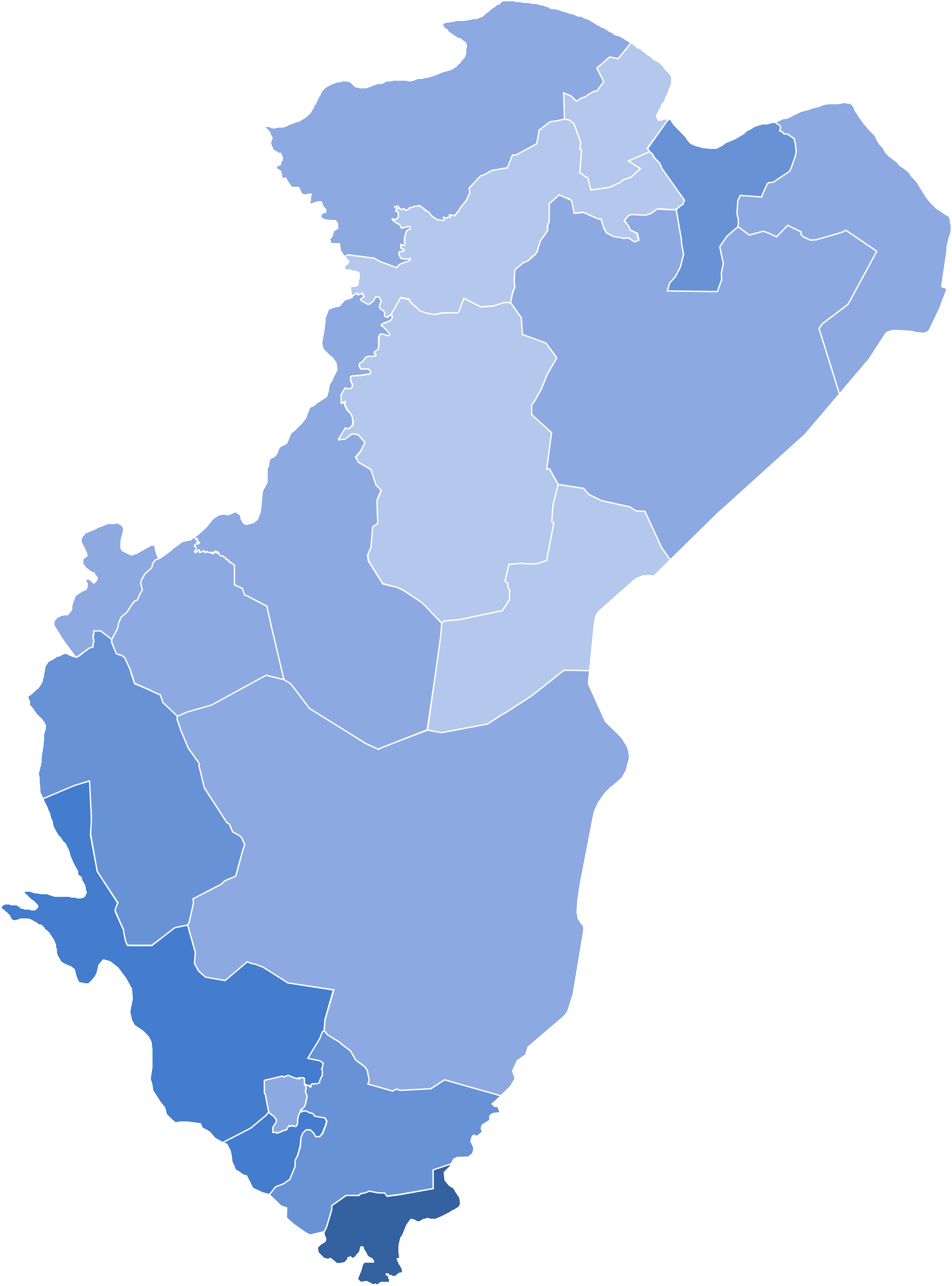
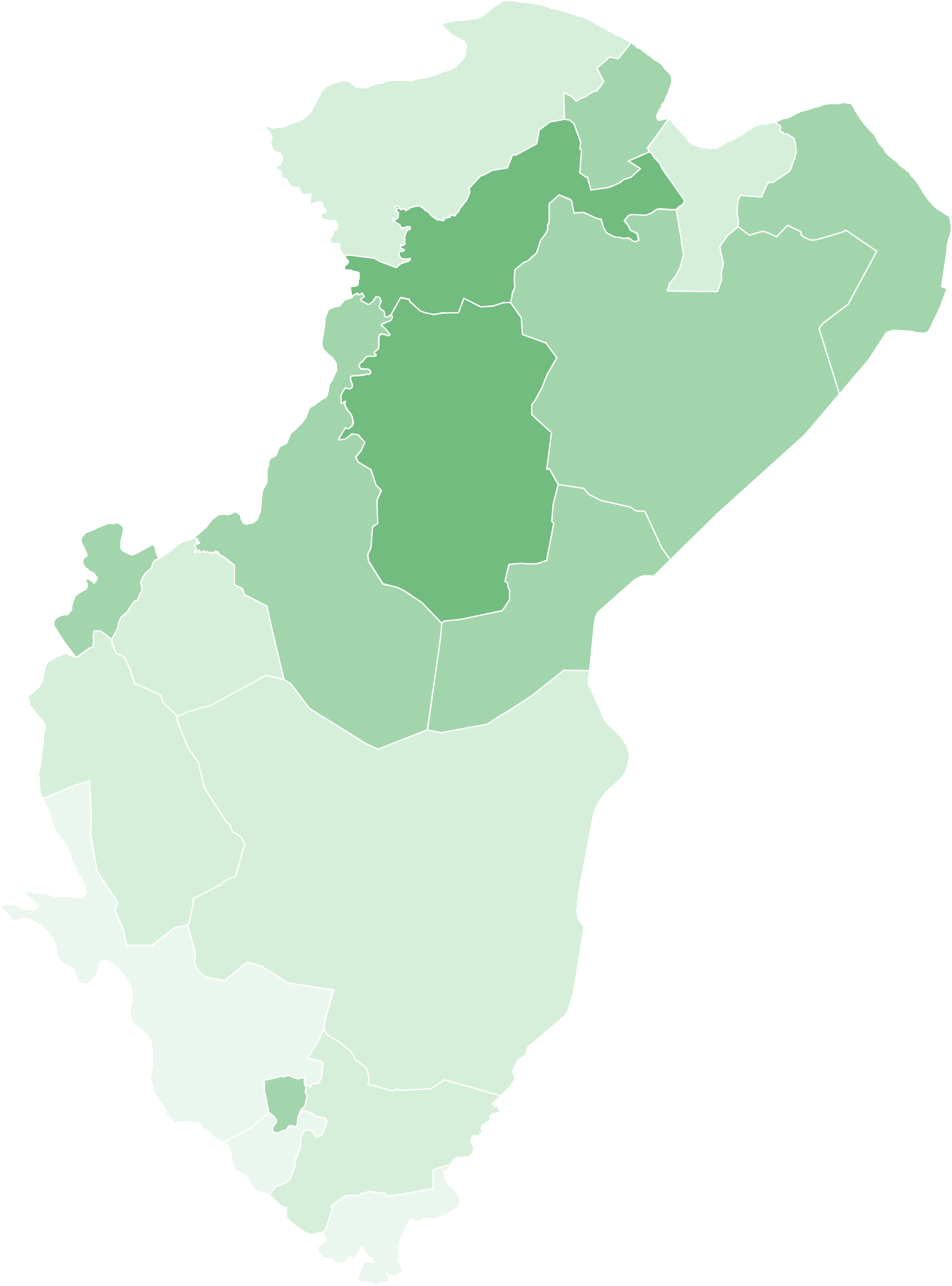
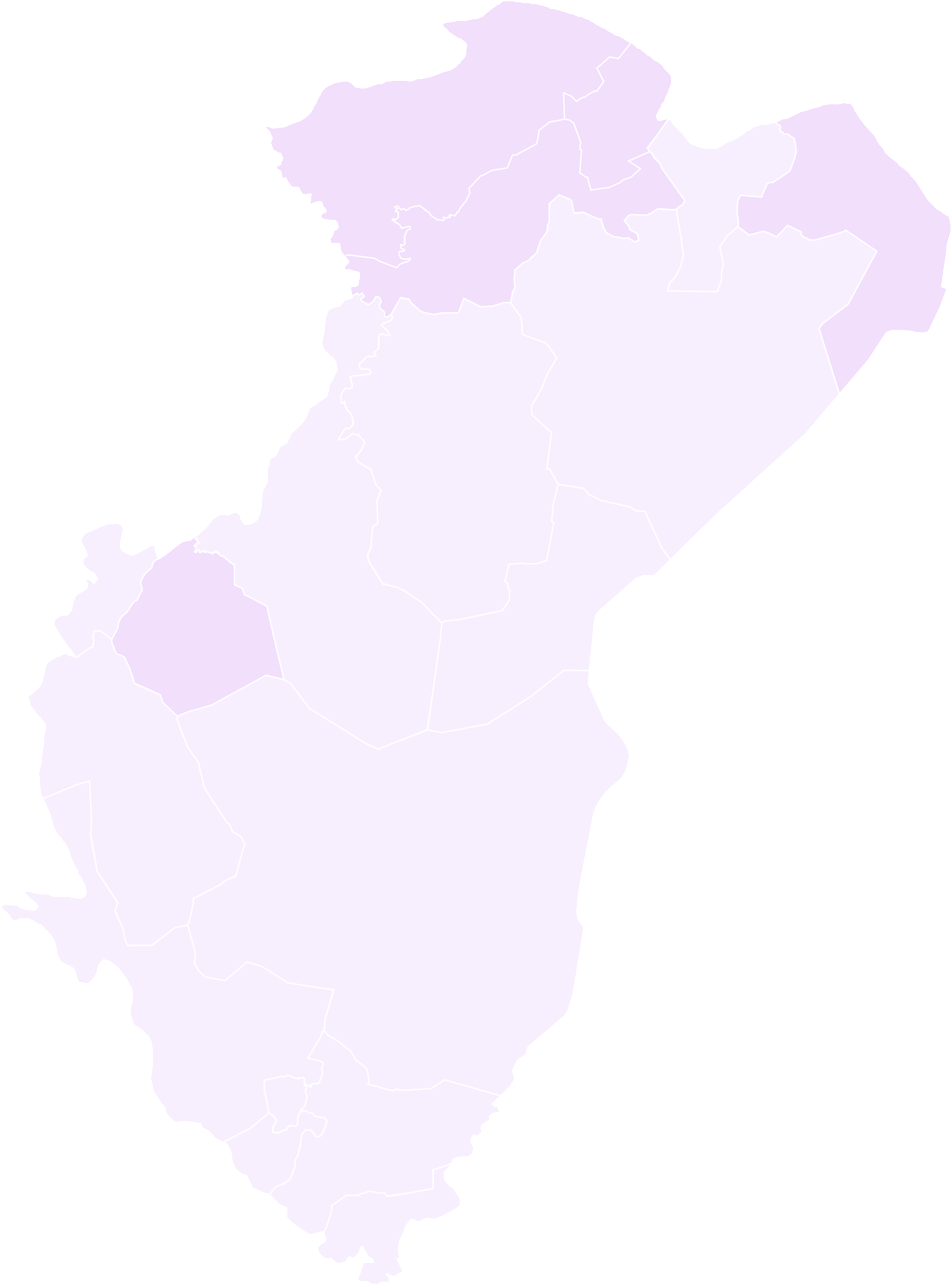
Percentage of the vote won by each major candidate by LGA.		Turnout Percentage by LGA
Otu; 40–50% 50–60% 60–70% 70–80% 80–90%	Onor <30% 30–40% 40–50% 50–60%	Turnout <30% 30–40%

== See also ==
- 2023 Nigerian elections
- 2023 Nigerian gubernatorial elections
