= 2019 Cross River State gubernatorial election =

2019 gubernatorial election in Cross River State, Nigeria

- (Nigeria)
- March 9, 2019
- Turnout: 35.92%
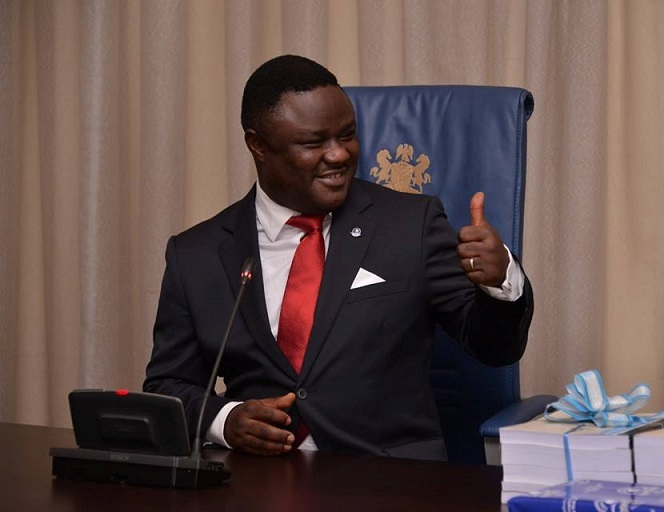
Nominee	Ben Ayade	John Owan Enoh
Party	PDP	APC
Running mate	Ivara Esu	Ntufam Ekpo Okon
Popular vote	381,484	131,161
Percentage	73.04%	25.11%
Governor before election
Ben Ayade
PDP
Elected Governor
Ben Ayade
PDP

The 2019 Cross River State gubernatorial election occurred on March 9, 2019. Incumbent PDP Governor Benedict Ayade won re-election for a second term, defeating APC's John Owan Enoh, and several minor party candidates.

Ayade won in all 18 LGAs of the state with a total of 73.04% of popular vote, while Enoh with no win in any LGA was his closest contestant with a total of 25.11% of popular vote having 250,323 votes less than Ayade.

Ben Ayade emerged unopposed in the PDP gubernatorial primary elections as the sole candidate, after the other candidate was disqualified. His running mate was Ivara Esu.

John Owan Enoh emerged the APC candidate in the gubernatorial primary election. His running mate was Ntufam Ekpo Okon.

Of the 26 candidates who aspired for the governorship seat, 24 were male, two were female.

== Electoral system ==
The Governor of Cross River State is elected using the plurality voting system.

== Primary election ==
=== PDP primary ===
The PDP primary election was held on 30 September 2018. Earlier on, Hon. Emmanuel Ibeshi, who was diequalified by the party from contesting in the primary election just about 24 hours before the exercise, sued the party and state governor for his disqualification, in court.

=== Candidates ===
- Party nominee: Benedict Ayade: Incumbent governor.
- Running mate: Ivara Esu
- Emmanuel Ibeshi: (Disqualified)

=== APC primary ===
The Guardian and Today Nigeria reported five candidates seeking to unseat the incumbent governor. A crisis earlier developed in the state's APC party, causing it to be divided into two factions: The Etim John faction and the other faction. The Etim John faction's results were are follows: Usani Uguru Usani 47,313 votes, John Owan Enoh 1,486 votes, Eyo Etim Nyong 1,052 votes, Edem Duke 1,322 votes, and John Odey 1,099 votes. However, the official results were announced by the Chairman of Electoral Committee, Ali Magaji, pronouncing John Owan-Enoh winner with 82,272 votes out of the 101,212 votes cast. Edem Duke was said to have had 7,367 votes while Usani Usani polled 1,778 votes. There were a total of 106,212 accredited voters who cast 117 invalid votes. The elections were held on September 30, 2018.

The official results were strongly opposed by three other contestants, led by Usani, who was also rejected by the APC as a candidate. However, a court ruling affirmed Enoh as the candidate for the party.

=== Candidates ===
John Owan Enoh	Winner
Ntufam Ekpo Okon	Running Mate
Edem Duke	1st Runner-Up
Usani Usani	2nd Runner-up
Eyo Etim Nyong	
John Odey	

== Results ==
A total of 26 candidates registered with the Independent National Electoral Commission to contest in the election. PDP Governor Benedict Ayade won re-election for a second term, defeating APC's Owan Enoh John (who despite being delisted by a Calabar High Court order from the elections, still had his party logo on the ballot paper), and several minor party candidates. Ayade polled 381,484 votes representing 73.04% of total vote cast, and Enoh 131,161 votes representing 25.11%. SDP's Eyo Ekpo came third with 4,818 votes representing 0.92% of total valid votes cast. The APC, however, rejected this result. Ayade won in all 18 local government areas of the state. The Returning Officer, Professor Akii Ibhadode, declared Ayade the winner after the collation of results from all 18 local government areas."Cross River Governor Ben Ayade Re-Elected". Channels Television. March 11, 2019.

The total number of registered voters in the state was 1,486,026 while 542,115 voters were accredited. Total number of votes cast was 533,808, while total number of valid votes was 522,309. Total rejected votes were 11,499.

Candidate	Party	Votes	%
Ayade Benedict Bengiousuye	People's Democratic Party (PDP)	381,484	73.04
John Owan Enoh	All Progressives Congress (APC)	131,161	25.11
Eyo Ekpo O.	Social Democratic Party (SDP)	4,818	0.92
Ntan Ebaye Ekpa	National Conscience Party (NCP)	1,092	0.21
Edward Eniad Ugbe	Action Democratic Party (ADP)	648	0.12
Ushie Tony Ashibesibe	African Democratic Congress (ADC)	490	0.09
Charles Inah Okoi	Alliance of Social Democrats (ASD)	360	0.07
Undie Emmanuel Ugbong	Young Democratic Party (YDP)	345	0.07
Ali Patrick	Progressive Peoples Alliance (PPA)	305	0.06
Ezama Castro Adoga	Young Progressive Party (YPP)	271	0.05
Uzong George Moses	All Blending Party (ABP)	262	0.05
Ngang Bassey Ngang	Democratic People's Party (DPP)	244	0.05
Ntami Nkanu Esege	People's Party of Nigeria (PPN)	124	0.02
Ofem Ubi Oka	Mega Party of Nigeria (MPN)	109	0.02
Arit Edet Aikpong	National Action Council (NAC)	107	0.02
Ebughe Kenneth	Alliance for Democracy (AD)	95	0.02
Omari Fredrick Eje	Justice Must Prevail Party (JMPP)	78	0.01
Michael Sunday	Independent Democrats (ID)	60	0.01
Ubi Hossana Ukonu	Democratic Peoples Congress (DPC)	52	0.01
Godwin Daniel Pastor	Mass Action Joint Alliance (MAJA)	49	0.01
Eno Eno Enang	Accord (A)	34	0.01
Mkposong Ekete Mkposong	Kowa Party (KP)	33	0.01
Charles Offiong	Democratic Alternative (DA)	27	0.01
Inah Thomas Enyi	Coalition for Change (C4C)	25	0.00
Ekeng Effiom Effiom	Action Alliance (AA)	22	0.00
Morphy Pamela Ubagidi	Change Advocacy Party (CAP)	14	0.00
Total		522,309	100.00
Valid votes		522,309	97.85
Invalid/blank votes		11,499	2.15
Total votes		533,808	100.00
Registered voters/turnout		1,486,026	35.92
Source: INEC

=== By local government area ===
Here are the results of the election from the local government areas of the state for the two major parties. The total valid votes of 522,309 represents the 26 political parties that participated in the election. Green represents LGAs won by Ayade. Blue represents LGAs won by Enoh.

County (LGA)	Benedict Ayade PDP		John Ewan Enoh APC		Total votes
County (LGA)	#	%	#	%	#
Abi	13,035		7,387		
Akamkpa	12,959		7,097		
Akpabuyo	12,614		4,524		
Bakassi	5,225		1,533		
Bekwarra	24,819		5,359		
Biase	11,811		6,250		
Boki					
Calabar Municipal	15,524		7,703		
Calabar South	19,411		8,603		
Etung	6,282		3,892		
Ikom	16,862		10,049		
Obanliku	15,066		4,538		
Obubra	19,575		9,461		
Obudu	65,167		4,296		
Odukpani	14,003		6,633		
Ogoja	28,798		7,466		
Yakurr	20,110		10,885		
Yala	42,271		10,756		
Totals					-

== APC candidate controversy ==
The APC's governorship nomination in Cross River was affected by an internal dispute over the party's primary election and competing claims to the party's ticket. Senator John Owan-Enoh emerged as the candidate from the primary recognised by the party's national leadership, while Minister of Niger Delta Affairs Usani Uguru Usani claimed that he had won a separate primary conducted by a faction of the state party organisation.

In January 2019, an Abuja Federal High Court dismissed Usani's suit seeking recognition as the APC governorship candidate. The court held, among other things, that the primary relied upon by Usani had not been conducted by the appropriate party authority.

The dispute continued into February. The Court of Appeal in Calabar refused an application for a stay of execution of a Federal High Court judgment concerning the leadership of the Cross River APC and ordered the parties to maintain the status quo pending the determination of the appeal.

On 22 February 2019, INEC announced that it had removed Owan-Enoh's name and other APC candidates from the list in compliance with a court order, while retaining the APC's name and logo on the ballot pending the submission of a candidate list by the relevant party executive.

However, the dispute was not resolved before election day. On 8 March, The Guardian reported that both Owan-Enoh and Usani were still claiming the APC governorship ticket, with each relying on different court decisions and party structures.

== Legal challenges ==
The result of the election was challenged before the Cross River State Governorship Election Petition Tribunal. Senator John Owan-Enoh and Usani Uguru Usani filed separate petitions concerning the election and the APC's governorship candidacy. Owan-Enoh challenged the declaration of Benedict Ayade and sought the withdrawal of Ayade's certificate of return and the conduct of another election.

On 12 September 2019, the Governorship Election Petition Tribunal dismissed the petitions filed by Owan-Enoh and Usani. In Owan-Enoh's case, the tribunal held that his complaint concerning his exclusion from the ballot was a pre-election matter and that the petition failed on the grounds raised.

Usani appealed the tribunal's decision. On 7 November 2019, the Court of Appeal sitting in Calabar dismissed the appeal and affirmed the tribunal's decision. The court also ordered Usani to pay costs to INEC, Ayade and the PDP.

The Court of Appeal judgment concerned Usani's petition and did not represent an appeal by Owan-Enoh; reporting at the time stated that Owan-Enoh had not appealed the dismissal of his petition.
