= 2015 Nigerian Senate elections in Cross River State =

The 2015 Nigerian Senate election in Cross River State was held on March 28, 2015, to elect members of the Nigerian Senate to represent Cross River State. John Enoh representing Cross River Central, Gershom Bassey representing Cross River South and Rose Okoji Oko representing Cross River North all won on the platform of the People's Democratic Party.

== Overview ==
Affiliation	Party		Total
Affiliation	APC	PDP	Total
Before Election	0	3	3
After Election	0	3	3

== Summary ==
District	Incumbent	Party	Elected Senator	Party
Cross River Central	Victor Ndoma-Egba	PDP	John Enoh	PDP
Cross River South	Bassey Otu	PDP	Gershom Bassey	PDP
Cross River North	Benedict Ayade	PDP	Rose Oko	PDP

== Results ==
=== Cross River Central ===
People's Democratic Party (Nigeria) candidate John Enoh won the election, defeating All Progressives Congress candidate Charles Ogida and other party candidates.

2015 Nigerian Senate election in Cross River State
Party	Candidate	Votes	%
PDP	John Enoh		
APC	Charles Ogida		
Total votes			
PDP hold			

=== Cross River South ===
People's Democratic Party (Nigeria) candidate Gershom Bassey won the election, defeating All Progressives Congress candidate Maria Ukpanyang and other party candidates.

2015 Nigerian Senate election in Cross River State
Party	Candidate	Votes	%
PDP	Gershom Bassey		
APC	Maria Ukpanyang		
Total votes			
PDP hold			

=== Cross River North ===
People's Democratic Party (Nigeria) candidate Rose Oko won the election, defeating All Progressives Congress candidate Kanjal Akorhim and other party candidates.

2015 Nigerian Senate election in Cross River State
Party	Candidate	Votes	%
PDP	Rose Oko		
APC	Kanjal Akorhim		
Total votes			
PDP hold			
