= Emmanuel Ironbar =

Nigerian politician

Hon. Chief Emmanuel Ironbar

Chief of Staff to the Governor of Cross River State
- Incumbent
- Assumed office 2023
- Governor: Bassey Otu

Personal details
- Born: Ekpo Edem, Calabar South, Cross River State, Nigeria
- Education: University of Calabar
- Occupation: Politician, public administrator

Emmanuel Ironbar is a Nigerian politician and public administrator who is the current Chief of Staff to the Governor of Cross River State.

== Early life and education ==
Ironbar is from Ekpo Edem in Calabar South, Cross River State. He attended Army Day Secondary School, Calabar. He later studied sociology at the University of Calabar and obtained a master's degree in public policy and administration.

On 26 July 2025, he received an honorary doctorate in public policy and administration from Crown University International, Delaware, during a convocation ceremony held at the University of Lagos.

== Career ==
Ironbar began his public service career as a special assistant to the chairman of Calabar South Local Government Area and later served as special adviser on security. He also worked with the Niger Delta Development Commission before his appointment as Chief of Staff to the Governor in 2023.

In 2024, he was conferred the traditional chieftaincy title of Otu Kinwang I by the Boki Nation. He also holds the traditional title of Wutoro Oboro I of the Egbe Clan in Ogoja.

== See also ==
- Executive Council of Cross River State
