= Adamu Uba Musa =

Nigerian politician

Commissioner for Inter‑Governmental Affairs, Cross River State
- In office January 2023 – May 2023
- Governor: Ben Ayade

Personal details
- Occupation: Politician

Mallam Adamu Uba Musa is a Nigerian politician who served as the Commissioner for Inter‑Governmental Affairs in Cross River State from January 2023 to May 2023 under Governor Ben Ayade. He was the first non‑indigene Muslim to be appointed to the Cross River State Executive Council.

== Early life and education ==
Musa was born in Ogoja in the northern part of Cross River State. He attended primary and secondary school in Igoli, Ogoja, and later graduated with a degree in Public Administration.

== Political career ==
In January 2023, Governor Ben Ayade appointed Adamu as Commissioner for Inter‑Governmental Affairs. The Cross River State House of Assembly confirmed his nomination along with twelve others.

== See also ==
- Executive Council of Cross River State
