= 2011 Nigerian Senate elections in Cross River State =

2011 Nigerian Senate election in Cross River State

The 2011 Nigerian Senate election in Cross River State was held on April 9, 2011, to elect members of the Nigerian Senate to represent Cross River State. Benedict Ayade representing Cross River North, Victor Ndoma-Egba representing Cross River Central and Bassey Otu representing Cross River South all won on the platform of Peoples Democratic Party.

== Overview ==
Affiliation	Party		Total
Affiliation	PDP	ACN	Total
Before Election			3
After Election	3	–	3

== Summary ==
District	Incumbent	Party	Elected Senator	Party
Cross River North			Benedict Ayade	PDP
Cross River Central			Victor Ndoma-Egba	PDP
Cross River South			Bassey Otu	PDP

== Results ==
=== Cross River North ===
Peoples Democratic Party candidate Benedict Ayade won the election, defeating other party candidates.

2011 Nigerian Senate election in Cross River State
Party	Candidate	Votes	%
PDP	Benedict Ayade		
Total votes			
PDP hold			

=== Cross River Central ===
Peoples Democratic Party candidate Victor Ndoma-Egba won the election, defeating other party candidates.

2011 Nigerian Senate election in Cross River State
Party	Candidate	Votes	%
PDP	Victor Ndoma-Egba		
Total votes			
PDP hold			

=== Cross River South ===
Peoples Democratic Party candidate Bassey Otu won the election, defeating party candidates.

2011 Nigerian Senate election in Cross River State
Party	Candidate	Votes	%
PDP	Bassey Otu		
Total votes			
PDP hold			
