= Peter Odey =

Deputy governor of Cross Rivers

His Excellency Rt. Hon. Peter Agbe Odey

Deputy Governor of Cross River State
- Incumbent
- Assumed office 29 May 2023
- Governor: Bassey Otu
- Preceded by: Ivara Esu

Personal details
- Born: Peter Odey; 2 June 1974 (age 51) Ogoja Local government, Nigeria
- Party: All Progressives Congress
- Occupation: Politician

Peter Odey (born 2 June 1974) is a Nigerian politician who is currently the deputy governor of Cross River State. He is the former leader of the Cross River State House of Assembly.

== Early life and education ==
Peter had his primary education at St. Benedict’s Primary School Igoli in Ogoja Local Government Area of Cross River State between 1979 and 1985. For his secondary education he attended both Government Technical College and Army Day Secondary School, both in Ogoja, graduating in 1993 with distinction. He gained admission to the University of Calabar in 1995 to study Sociology and graduated with a BSc. (Hons) in 1999. At the turn of the millennium, he proceeded to serve his fatherland through the National Youth Service Corps in Nguru, Yobe State. He was named the Corper Liaison Officer (CLO) in his batch where he served as an intermediary between the management of the scheme and the corpers whilst working as a focal member of the Nguru Local Government Poverty Alleviation Programme (PAP).

At the completion of his youth service, he proceeded to the top-ranked Catholic University in Lueven, Belgium, where in 2002, he bagged a master's degree in Political Sociology. He won a scholarship to study yet another Master’s degree in International Relations with a specialty in Peace & Conflict Resolution at the London Metropolitan University between 2008 and 2009 where bagged an MA with distinction. He returned to the University of Calabar where he has successfully completed his LLB programme and more recently in 2023 completed his PhD in Peace Studies and Conflict Resolution.

== Early career ==
Odey was employed by the UNDP to work as a Conflict Adviser immediately after his Master’s in London. During his employment with the UN, he served in Kuwait, Sudan and Abuja before leaving to head the Security and Risk Management Department of the Foreign Office at the British High Commission Nigeria.

== Politics ==
The lawmaker's love for politics dates back to his days of student unionism at the University of Calabar. Whilst there, he was at various times elected to serve in the Student Union Government (SUG) of UNICAL, National Association of Cross River State Students (NACRISS), and the National Association of Nigerian Students (NANS).

After unsuccessful attempts at contesting for the chairmanship of Ogoja Local Government Area and Member of the Cross River State House of Assembly in 2007 and 2011 respectively, in 2015 he was overwhelmingly elected to represent the people of Ogoja in the Cross River State House of Assembly and re-elected in 2019 when he served as the Leader of the 9th Assembly, both times on the platform of the Peoples Democratic Party (PDP).

In 2023, Peter was selected as running mate to Governor Bassey Otu for the 2023 Cross River Gubernatorial elections under the platform of the All progressives Congress (APC), they emerged victorious at the polls, and they were sworn in as Governor and deputy on May 29, 2023.

== Legislative career ==
Focused on giving effective representation to his people, he sponsored a number of bills, moved and supported many impactful motions in the 8th and 9th Assembly chief of which are:

- a bill domesticating the Sustainable Development Goals and the creation of the Ministry of Sustainable Development,
- a bill creating the Cross River State Privatization Council,
- a bill establishing the Continuous Teacher Training Institute Biase,
- a bill to change the Cross River State University of Technology to a full-fledged degree awarding university, the University of Cross River (UNICROSS),
- a bill to establish the Ogoja Polytechnic and
- a bill on Conflict Resolution

In 2021 Peter Odey decamped to the All Progressives Congress (APC). In 2022 he was selected as running mate to Senator Prince Bassey Edet Otu for the 2023 Cross River gubernatorial elections. In February 2023, Prince Bassey Edet Otu and Peter Odey were duly elected as Governor and Deputy Governor of Cross River State respectively in a resounding victory. In spite of the legal challenges to their victory, the Supreme Court of Nigeria affirmed their election in a unanimous judgment delivered on the 12th of January 2024, freeing the duo of any legal encumbrances to actualising their People First programme for the advancement of Cross River State.

== Chieftaincy title ==
On the 3rd of December 2023, Rt. Hon. Peter Agbe Odey was conferred with the title of Lekwel E’Mbe I of Mbube by the Paramount Ruler of Ogoja, HRM Oti Mathias Odey Abua. The title means “Pillar of Mbube” and reflects what Peter Odey has strived to be for his people.
