= 2012 Cross River State gubernatorial election =

2012 gubernatorial election in Cross River State, Nigeria

- February 25, 2012
Nominee	Liyel Imoke	Usani Uguru Usani
Party	PDP	ACN
Running mate	Efiok Cobham	Abdulrazak Namdas
Popular vote	451,544	31,026
Governor before election
Liyel Imoke
PDP
Elected Governor
Liyel Imoke
PDP

The 2012 Cross River State gubernatorial election occurred in Nigeria on February 25, 2012. The PDP nominee Liyel Imoke won the election, defeating Usani Uguru Usani of the ACN.

Liyel Imoke emerged as PDP candidate. He picked Efiok Cobham as his running mate. Usani Uguru Usani was the ACN candidate.

== Electoral system ==
The Governor of Cross River State is elected using the plurality voting system.

== Primary election ==
=== PDP primary ===
The PDP primary election was held on January 23, 2012. Liyel Imoke emerged PDP flag bearer after polling 737 votes and defeating his closest rival, former Nigerian Ambassador to Mali and former PDP state chairman, Soni Abang who scored 3. He picked Efiok Cobham as his running mate.

=== ACN primary ===
The ACN primary election was held on February 6, 2012. Usani Uguru Usani emerged the party's flag bearer after defeating his closest rival, Mike Ogar.

== Results ==
Candidate	Party	Votes	%
Liyel Imoke	People's Democratic Party	451,544	93.57
Usani Uguru Usani	Action Congress of Nigeria	31,026	6.43
Total		482,570	100.00
Source: Channels TV
