= Bekwarra =

Bekwarra Ebekwarra Bekwei
- LGA
- Interactive map of Bekwarra
- Location in Nigeria
- Coordinates: 6°41′38″N 8°58′03″E
- Country: Nigeria
- State: Cross River State
- Headquarters: Abuochiche

Government
  - Local Government Chairman: Hon. Theresa Akwaji Ushie (Queen Mother T)(APC)

Area
  - Total: 306 km^{2} (118 sq mi)

Population (2006 census)
  - Total: 105,822
  - Density: 346/km^{2} (896/sq mi)
- Time zone: UTC+1 (WAT)
- 3-digit postal code prefix: 550
- ISO 3166 code: NG.CR.BE
- Website: www.crossriverhub.com.ng/bekwarra

Bekwarra is a Local Government Area in northern Cross River State, Nigeria. Its headquarters is Abuochiche (or Abuo Chiche); a town on the A4 highway. Other towns in the LGA are Abuagbor-Iye, Nyanya-Ulim, Nyanya-Idigwe, Gakem, Itekpa, Ugboro, Ibiragidi, Utukwe, Afrike and Ukpah, ijibor, Beten, Ugboro, Anyikang, Ebegang, Utukpuru, Ebewo, and others.

It has an area of 306 square kilometres (118 sq mi), and had a population of 105,822 as of the 2006 census.

The postal code of the area is 550. The major occupation of the Bekwarra people is farming, Groundnut trading, trading, hunting and tapping of palm wine. It is known for the production of groundnut. Other crops grown in the locality include rice, maize, yam, cassava, pineapple, plantain and banana.

The term “Bekwarra” is applied to the particular ethnic group, and local authorities and individuals refer to it as Bekwarra. The words 'Bekworrra' and 'Bekworrah' are still spelled out, but Bekwarra has been widely accepted because of its great consistency with the vocal system used by fellows of the ethnic group and its better suitability to the people of Bekwarra during the pre-colonial era.

They reside in the northern portion of Ogoja province, in the Eastern part of Nigeria, with attached borderline to the Northern part of Nigeria. They dwell in a region at a little greater than 260 square kilometres or 100 square miles and its western boundary at a distance of few miles in the Eastern part of Ogoja town. There are limited residential associates of other ethnic groups within this area and they appear to be a very high point of dialectal equality.

== Geography ==
Bekwarra LGA is made up of several rivers and tributaries and has a total size of 306 square kilometres or 118 square miles. The region's average temperature is believed to be 25 degrees Celsius (77 degrees Fahrenheit), and its estimated humidity is 91%.
