= Daniel Effiong Asuquo =

Nigerian politician (born 1962)

Daniel Effiong Asuquo is a Nigerian politician. He was a member representing Akamkpa/Biase Federal Constituency in the House of Representatives.

== Early life and education ==
Daniel Effiong Asuquo was born on 4 June 1962 and hails from Cross River State, Nigeria. He attended St. Louis Primary School, Kano, before proceeding to Federal Government College, Kano, and Hope Waddell Training Institution, Calabar, for his secondary education. He later obtained a Bachelor of Science degree in Banking and Finance from the University of Calabar and also attended the Cross River State College of Education, Akamkpa.

== Public service career ==
Asuquo began his career in public service as Personal Assistant to the Chairman of Akamkpa Local Government Council in 1996. He later served as Chairman of Akamkpa Local Government Area between 1999 and 2002, where he was responsible for overseeing local government administration and community development programmes.

Between 2008 and 2010, he served as Director General of the Cross River State Electrification Agency. In that capacity, he supervised programmes aimed at improving electricity infrastructure and expanding access to power in parts of Cross River State before seeking elective office.

== Political career ==
From 2008 to 2010, he was the Director General, Cross River State Electrification Agency

Asuquo was elected to the House of Representatives in 2011 to represent Akamkpa/Biase Federal Constituency of Cross River State on the platform of the Peoples Democratic Party (PDP). He was subsequently re-elected in 2015 and 2019, serving three consecutive terms in the National Assembly.

During the 2023 electoral cycle, he sought the governorship ticket of the PDP in Cross River State. Following the party's primary election, he defected to the Labour Party, where he became the party's candidate for Cross River South Senatorial District in the 2023 general election.

== Legislative career ==
As a member of the House of Representatives, Asuquo served on several standing committees, including the Committees on Legislative Budget and Research, Niger Delta Development Commission, Marine Safety, Education and Administration, Land Transport, and Federal Character. His committee assignments reflected his legislative interests in infrastructure, public administration, regional development and transportation.

During his tenure in the National Assembly, he participated in legislative debates, committee oversight and constituency representation on behalf of the people of Akamkpa/Biase Federal Constituency.
