= John Owan Enoh =

Nigerian politician (born 1966)

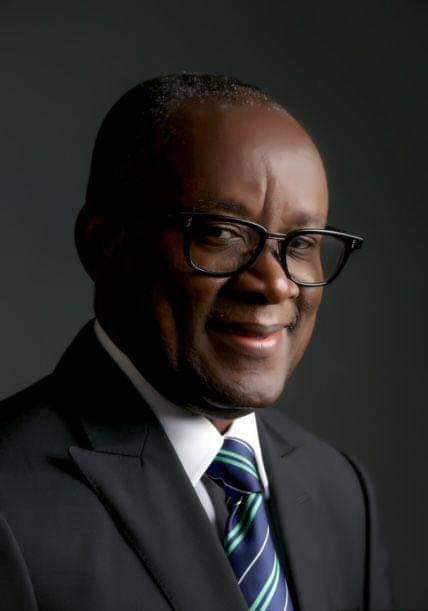

Honourable Minister of state for Industry.Federal Ministry of Industry, Trade and Investment.
- Incumbent
- Assumed office 21 August 2023
- President: Bola Tinubu
- Preceded by: Sunday Dare

Senator for Cross River Central
- In office 9 June 2015 – 9 June 2019
- Preceded by: Victor Ndoma-Egba
- Succeeded by: Sandy Ojang Onor

Member of the House of Representatives of Nigeria from Cross River
- In office 3 June 2003 – 6 June 2015

Personal details
- Born: 4 June 1966 (age 60) Agbokim, Eastern Region (now in Cross River State), Nigeria
- Party: All Progressives Congress (2017–present)
- Other political affiliations: Peoples Democratic Party (before 2017)
- Spouse: Rachel Owan-Enoh
- Children: 3
- Education: University of Calabar
- Occupation: Politician; teacher; farmer; philanthropist

John Owan Enoh ( born 4 June 1966) is a Nigerian politician, teacher, farmer, and philanthropist. He was the 36th Minister of Sports Development of Nigeria.He is currently the Minister of State for Industry, Federal Ministry of Industry, Trade and Investment (Industry).

== Early life and education ==
Enoh was born and raised in Agbokim Waterfalls community of Cross River State. He graduated from the University of Calabar in 1988 with a bachelor’s degree in Sociology, and was the best-graduating student of his set. He attended several courses at home and abroad on capacity building in aid of his legislative work.

Enoh is a fellow of the Centre for Peace and Conflict Studies (CEPACS) at the University of Ibadan. He was also listed as one of Nigeria's 50 Most Outstanding Legislative Icons (1999 – 2010) in a book published by Parlia Consult, a Consortium of Legislative Historians.

== Political career ==
Enoh returned to the University of Calabar and served as a lecturer between 1991 and 1997. He received an M.Sc (Demography), a PGDM, and an MBA degree.

In 2003, he got elected to the House of Representatives on the platform of the Peoples Democratic Party, where he served in the 5th, 6th and 7th Houses.

During his first term, he served as deputy chairman of the House Committee on Culture & Tourism (2003-2005) and the House Committee on Appropriation (2005-2007). In his second term, he was chairman of the House Committee on Finance (2007-2011). He chaired the Committee on Appropriation in his third term (2011-2015).

He got elected to represent the Cross River Central Senatorial District and served in the 8th Senate (2015-2019) as chairman of the Senate Committee on Finance.

He was a member of the Peoples Democratic Party (PDP) until May 2017, when he decamped to the ruling All Progressive Congress (APC) and contested for governorship of Cross River State, which he lost to Ben Ayade.

He was appointed minister of Sports Development by President Bola Tinubu on 16 August 2023. On the 23rd of October 2024, the President redeployed Senator John Owan Enoh to the Federal Ministry of Industry, Trade and Investment, as the Honourable Minister of State for Industry.

== Farm venture ==
Enoh owns numerous farms where he conducts agriculture and livestock production. The farming venture he started in 2000 has cultivated about 2000 hectares of land as of 2021. Enoh's farm spreads across various parts of Cross River State and includes about 150 hectares of planted palms in Agbokim Waterfalls, expanding to about 100 hectares of planted palms at Etara-Ekuri. His ventures lie in Etung LGA of Cross River State.

Enoh is said to operate an out-grower scheme in communities where his farms are located.

== Philanthropy ==
Enoh runs a philanthropy including a foundation named JOE (John Owan Enoh) Foundation, which provides aid for people living with diabetes in Nigeria.

== Personal life ==
He is married to Rachel Owan-Enoh and has three children with her; Rachel, John Jr., and Victor. He is a football and lawn tennis enthusiast.
