= Usani Uguru Usani =

Nigerian politician

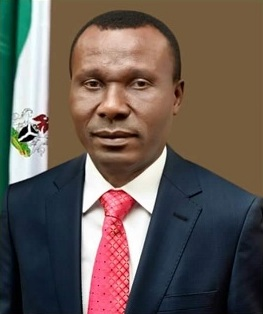
- 4th Minister of Niger Delta Affairs

Minister of Niger Delta
- In office 11 November 2015 – 29 May 2019
- President: Muhammadu Buhari
- Preceded by: Stephen Oru
- Succeeded by: Godswill Akpabio

Commissioner for Youth, Sports & Social Development and Commissioner of Information, Cross River State
- In office July 1995 – February 1997
- Governor: Gregory Agboneni

Commissioner for Agriculture, Water Resources and Rural Development, Cross River State
- In office February 1997 – May 1999
- Governor: Umar Farouk Ahmed Christopher Osondu

Personal details
- Born: 27 January 1961 (age 65) Nko, Yakurr, Yakurr, Cross River State, Nigeria
- Party: All Progressives Congress
- Education: University of Jos

Usani Uguru Usani (born 27 January 1961) is a Nigerian pastor, lecturer and politician who served as Minister of Niger Delta Affairs in the Nigerian government.

== Early life and education ==
Usani was born on 27 January 1961 in Nko, Yakurr Local Government Area of Cross River State.

== Career ==
Usani is a pastor. Usani served on the National Youth Service Corps (NYSC) scheme as a secondary school teacher in Government Science Secondary School, Kagara, Rafi Local Government Area of Niger State. After his NYSC service, he was a teacher from August 1988 – January 1992 at Community Secondary School, Iko-Esai and Secondary School, Adim, all of Cross River State. From February 1992 to November 1993, Usani served in the Office of the Governor of Cross River State as Personal assistant to Governor Clement Ebri on Speech Writing and Policy Analysis, at the same time as Secretary, Structural Adjustment Programme (SAP) Relief Committee (a government agenda programme to alleviate the effects of Structural Adjustment Programmes) with added responsibility of Legislative Liaison matters. Within the same period, he was appointed as the Sole Administrator of the Nigerian Legion, Cross River State Command. Between 1994 and 1995, he was appointed as Director Oban (Nigeria) Rubber and Palm Estates Limited.

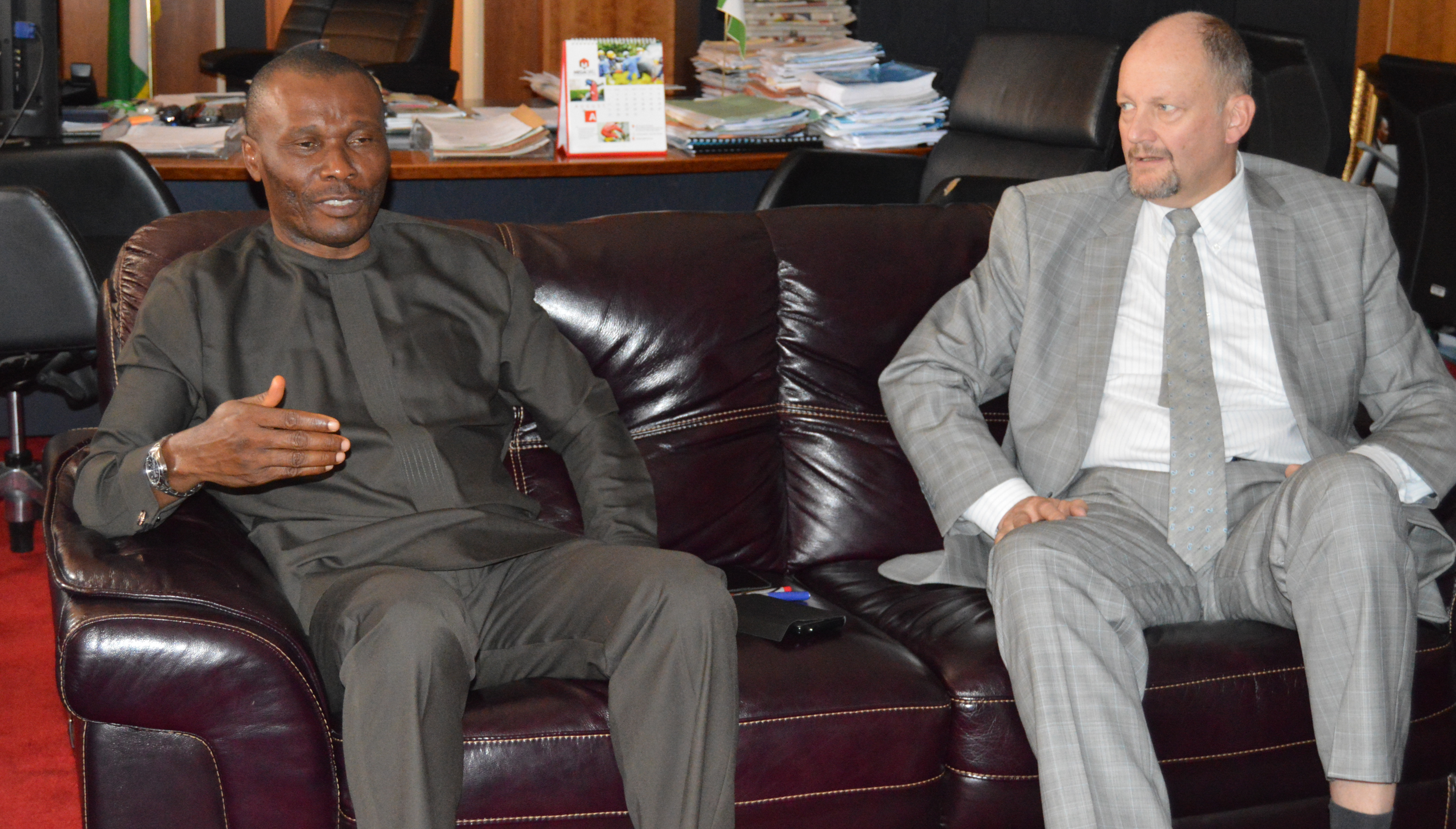
Usani Uguru Usani conversing with Michel Arron, Head of the European Union Delegation to Nigeria and the ECOWAS.

In July 1995, Usani was appointed Commissioner in Ministry of Youth, Sports and Social Development, Cross River State under Military Administrator Gregory Agboneni; in November 1995, the portfolio was enlarged to include Information duties. In February 1997, in a cabinet dissolution and reconstitution, he was reappointed to the Ministry of Agriculture, Water Resources and Rural Development under Military Administrator Umar Farouk Ahmed where he served until 1999, after serving with Christopher Osondu, the last Military Administrator of Cross River State. From January 2001 – January 2004, he was appointed as member of the Governing Board of the Nigerian Copyrights Commission.

Usani contested the seat of Governorship of Cross River State three times. In the 2003 general elections under the platform of National Democrats, he was defeated by Donald Duke, in 2012 under the platform of the Action Congress of Nigeria (ACN) he was defeated by Liyel Imoke and in 2015 on the platform of the All Progressives Congress.

From September 2004 – 2006 Usani lectured at the London Academy of Management Sciences, Ilford, Essex, in a variety of courses to Business undergraduates, MBA students and professional candidates of ABE and ACCA. He also taught, on a part-time basis, in the London Academy of Higher Education, Stratford, London.

Between July 2014 and November 2015, he was elected the State Chairman of the All Progressives Congress (APC), Cross River State.

In November 2015, Usani was appointed by President Muhammadu Buhari into the Nigerian Federal Executive Council as the Minister of Niger Delta Affairs. He foresaw a Technical Audit Report of projects from the Ministry's inception and a baseline study of the social and infrastructure resource base of the region (aided by the UNDP) has been conducted. The Niger Delta Action Plan has been revisited. In November 2015, Usani was mandated by the Nigerian Presidency to inaugurate the board, and subsequently supervise the activities of the Niger Delta Development Commission (NDDC), as part of the Ministry of Niger Delta Affairs' statutory duties.

On 15 March 2017, Usani was decorated with an Award of Excellence for National Development by the Association of Nigerian Geographers and appointed Adjunct Lecturer in the Department of Geography in the Nasarawa State University, Keffi, Nasarawa State, Nigeria.
