= Bassey Otu =

Nigerian politician (born 1959)

His Excellency Bassey Otu
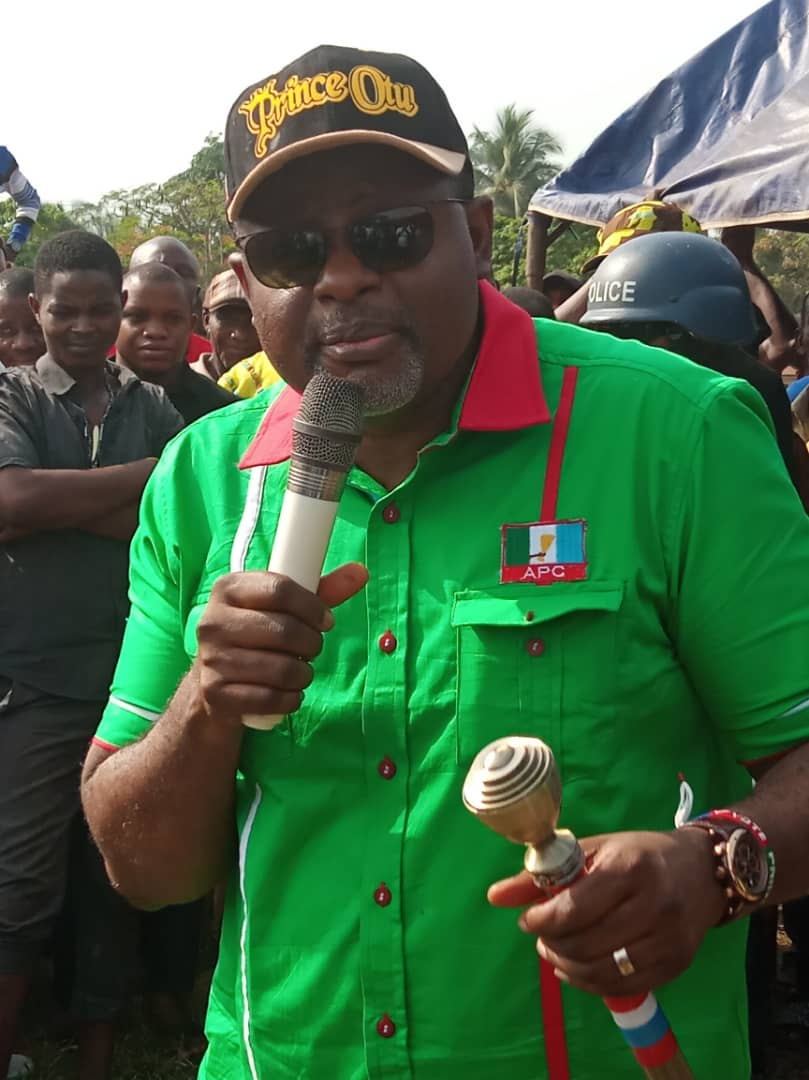

Governor of Cross River State
- Incumbent
- Assumed office 29 May 2023
- Deputy: Peter Odey
- Preceded by: Ben Ayade

Senator for Cross River South
- In office 6 June 2011 – 6 June 2015
- Preceded by: Bassey Ewa-Henshaw
- Succeeded by: Gershom Bassey

Member of the House of Representatives of Nigeria from Cross River
- In office 3 June 2003 – 6 June 2011
- Preceded by: Nya Asuquo
- Succeeded by: Toyo Esu
- Constituency: Calabar Municipal / Odukpani

Personal details
- Born: 18 October 1959 (age 66) Calabar, Eastern Region, British Nigeria (now in Cross River State, Nigeria)
- Party: All Progressives Congress (2016–present)
- Other political affiliations: Peoples Democratic Party (before 2016)
- Occupation: Politician

Bassey Edet Otu (born 18 October 1959) popularly known as Sweet Prince is a Nigerian politician and the current governor of Cross River State Southern Nigeria. who served as a onetime senator for Cross River South from 2011 to 2015, and a onetime representative of Calabar Municipal/Odukpani constituency of Cross River State, in the House of Representatives from 2003 to 2011.

== Background ==
Prince Bassey Edet Otu was born on 18 October 1959 to the family of Late Eld. & Mrs. Edet Okon Otu of Adiabo in Odukpani Local Government Area of Cross River State. He grew up in his home city of Calabar and in Jos, Plateau State, where his father had been assigned to the mission of the Church of Scotland. He obtained a bachelor's degree from the Faculty of Social Sciences from the University of Calabar. Before entering politics, he was engaged in banking and the petroleum sector. He is also into farming.

== House of Representatives (2003–2011) ==
Otu was elected a Member of the House of Representatives in April 2003 to represent Calabar Municipality/Odukpani Federal Constituency and re-elected in April 2007. Within this period (2003–2011), he was Chairman, House Committee on Petroleum (Upstream), Vice Chairman, House Committee on National Population and member of committees on Power, Ministry of Niger Delta, Inter-Parliamentary Relations, Inter-Intra Party Relations, Environment, Water Resources and Defense. In a 2007 interview, he said the ruling by an international court that the Bakassi peninsula belonged to Cameroon was wrong, but that the job now was to resettle displaced relatives of Nigerians and move on. Otu was Chairman of the House of Representatives Committee on Petroleum Resources (Upstream).

== Senator ==
In 2011, Otu was elected as Senator representing Cross River Southern Senatorial District. On arrival in the Senate, he became the Chairman, Senate Committee on Finance and later Chairman, Senate Committee on Banking and other financial Institutions; he was also a member, Committee on Navy, Power, Petroleum and Water Resources and his believed to have great impact on the citi,

In 2018, Otu was appointed into the board of National Health Insurance Scheme (NHIS) by President Muhammadu Buhari.

Following his inaugural speech in May 2023 Otu claims to have joined politics for the service of humanity

== Gallery ==
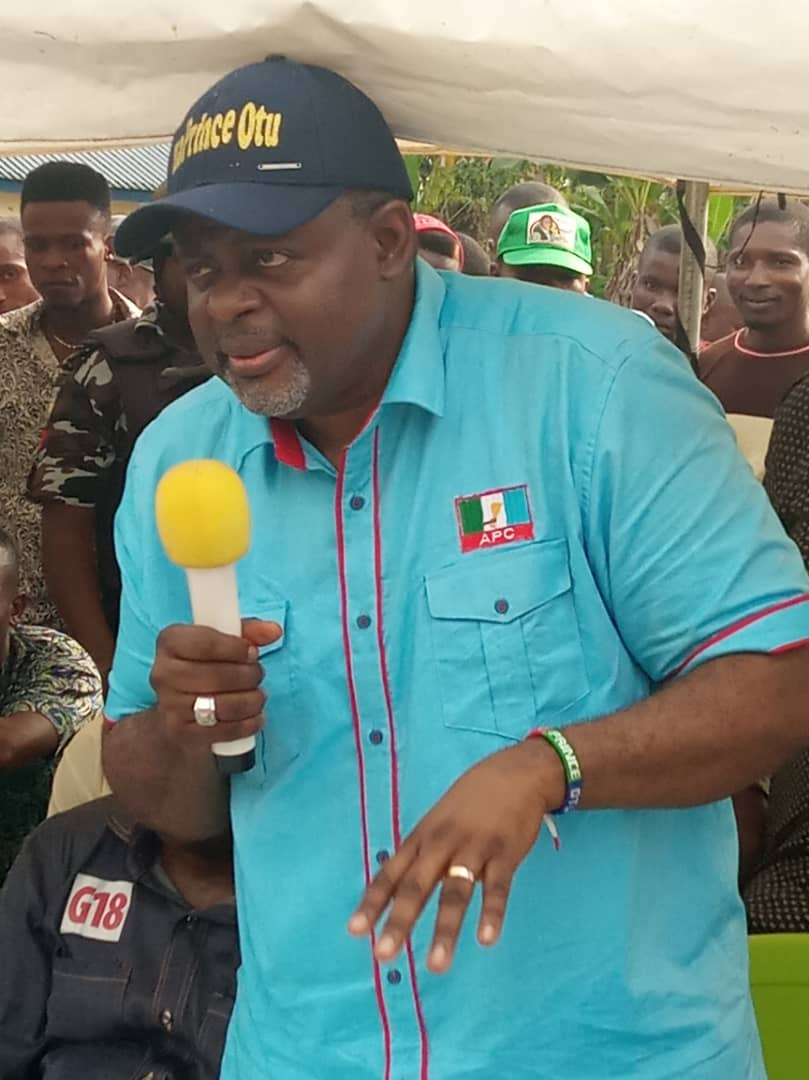
The senator during his 2019 senatorial Campaign.

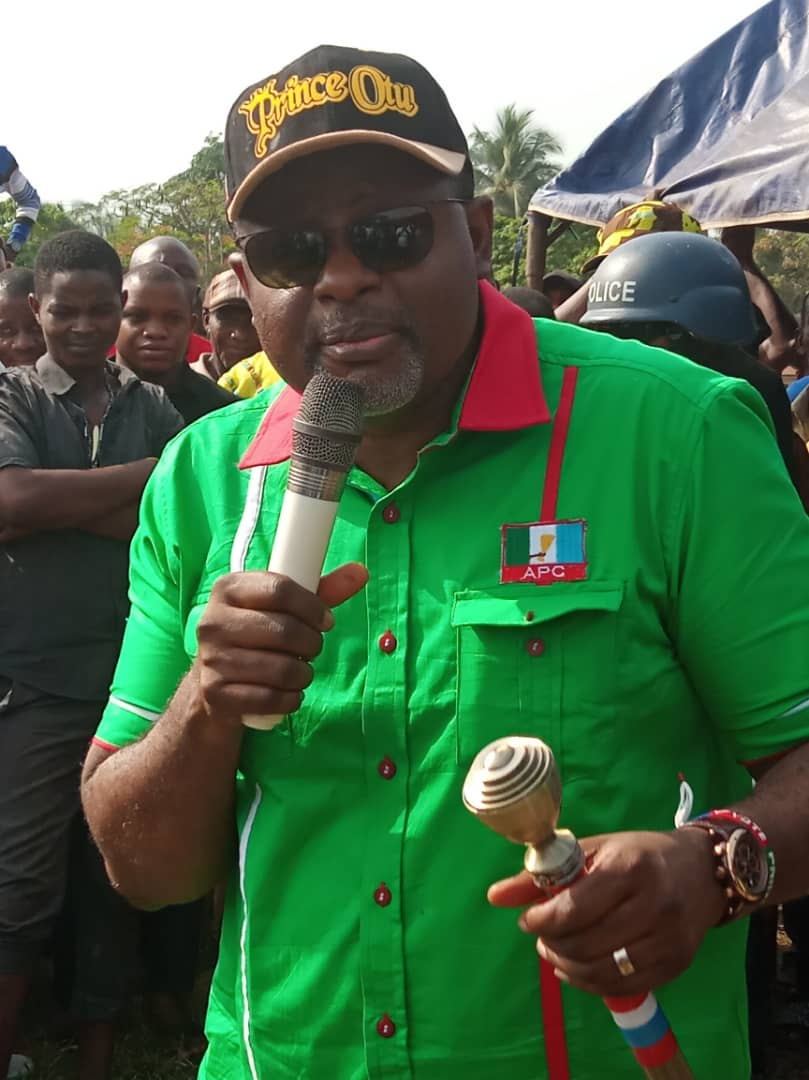
@Rural Campaign

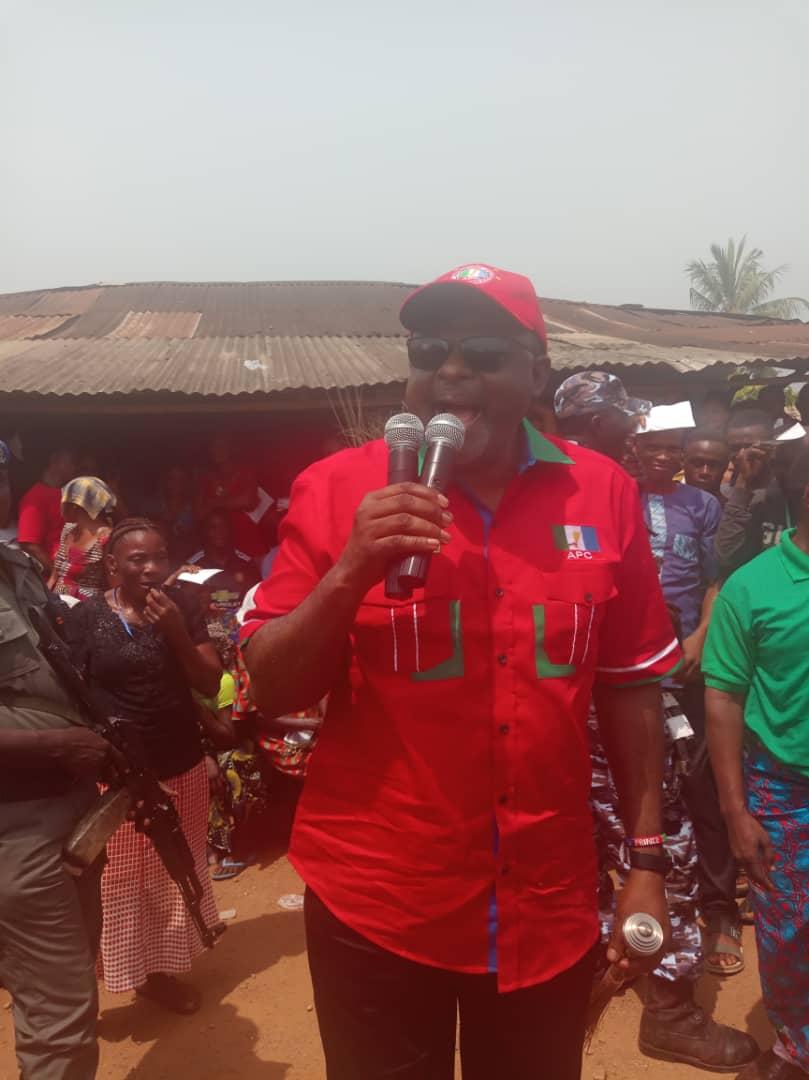
During the 2019 APC Door-door Campaign

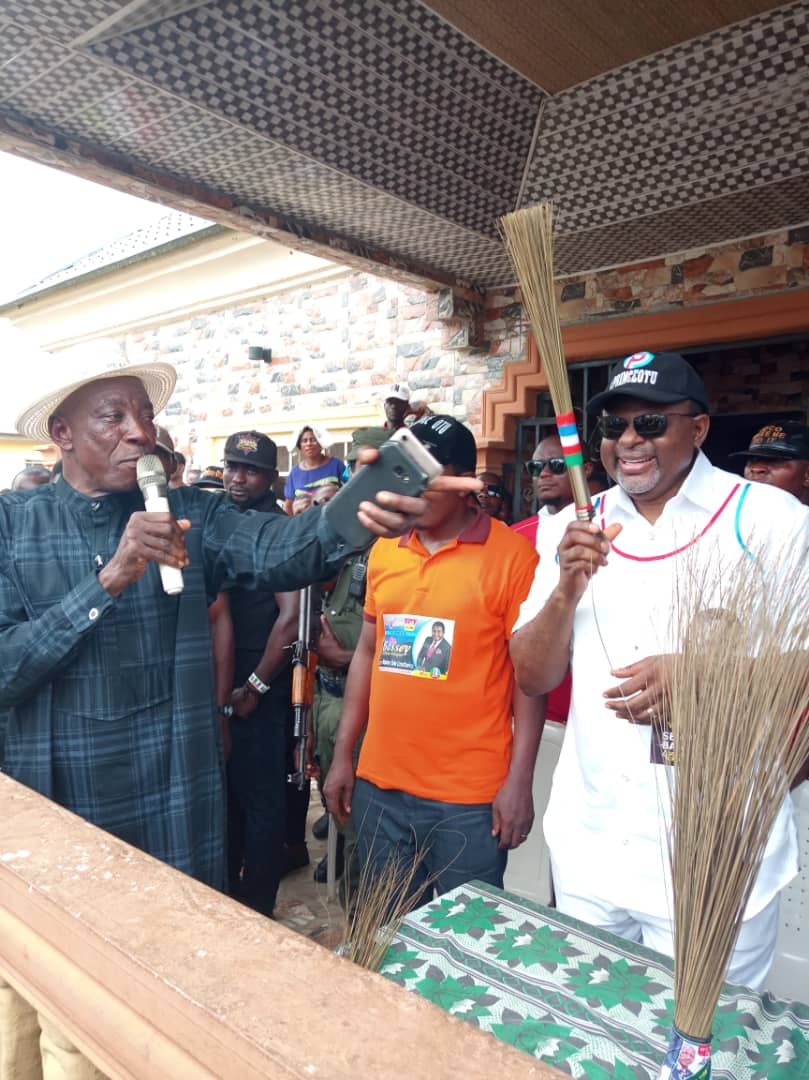
@APC Campaign

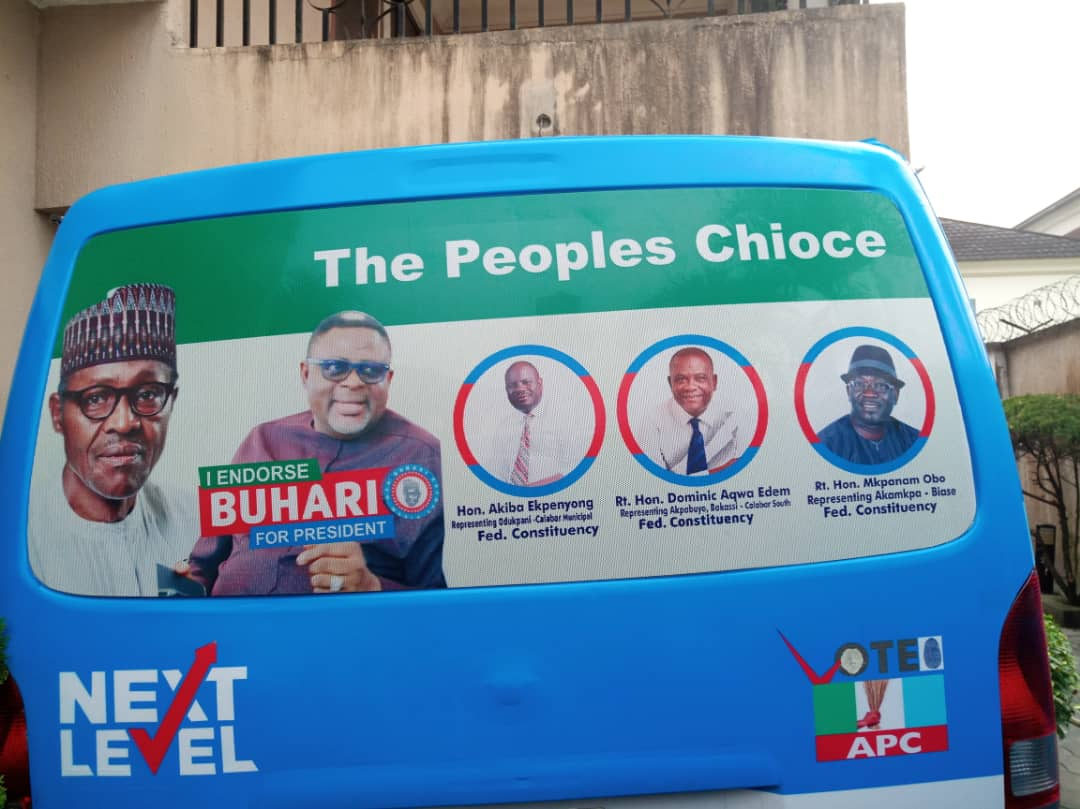
2019 APC campaign vehicle

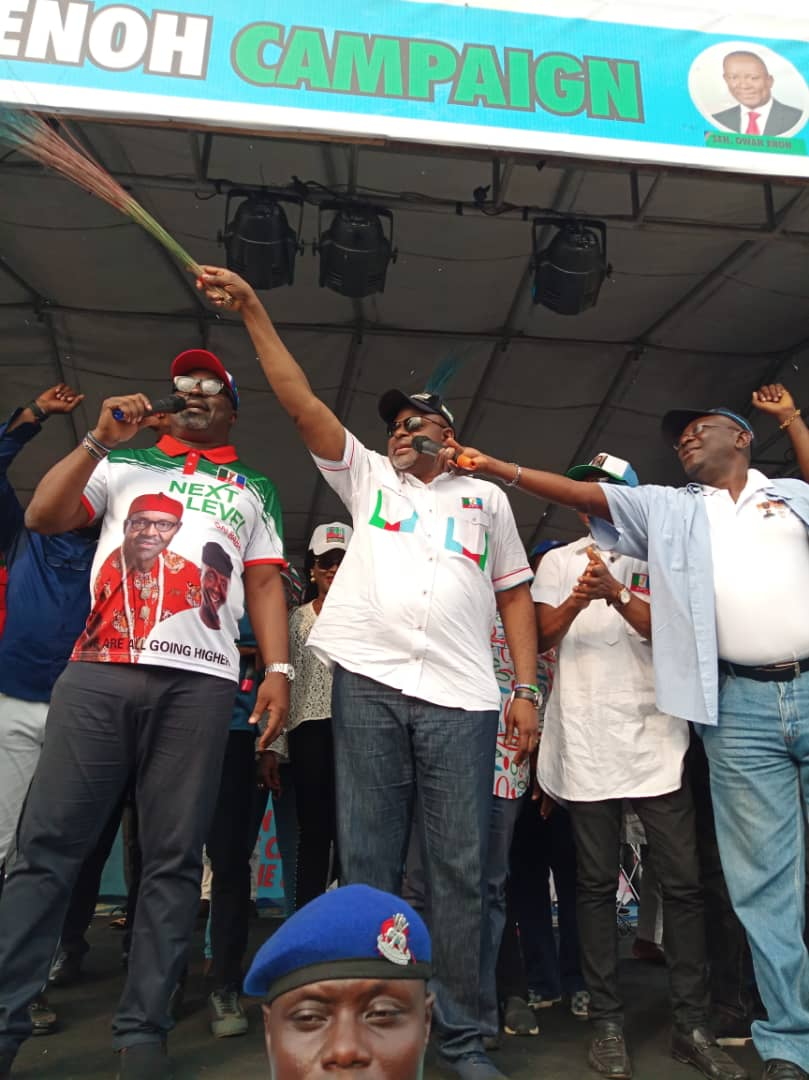
2019 APC Governorship and Presidential Campaign

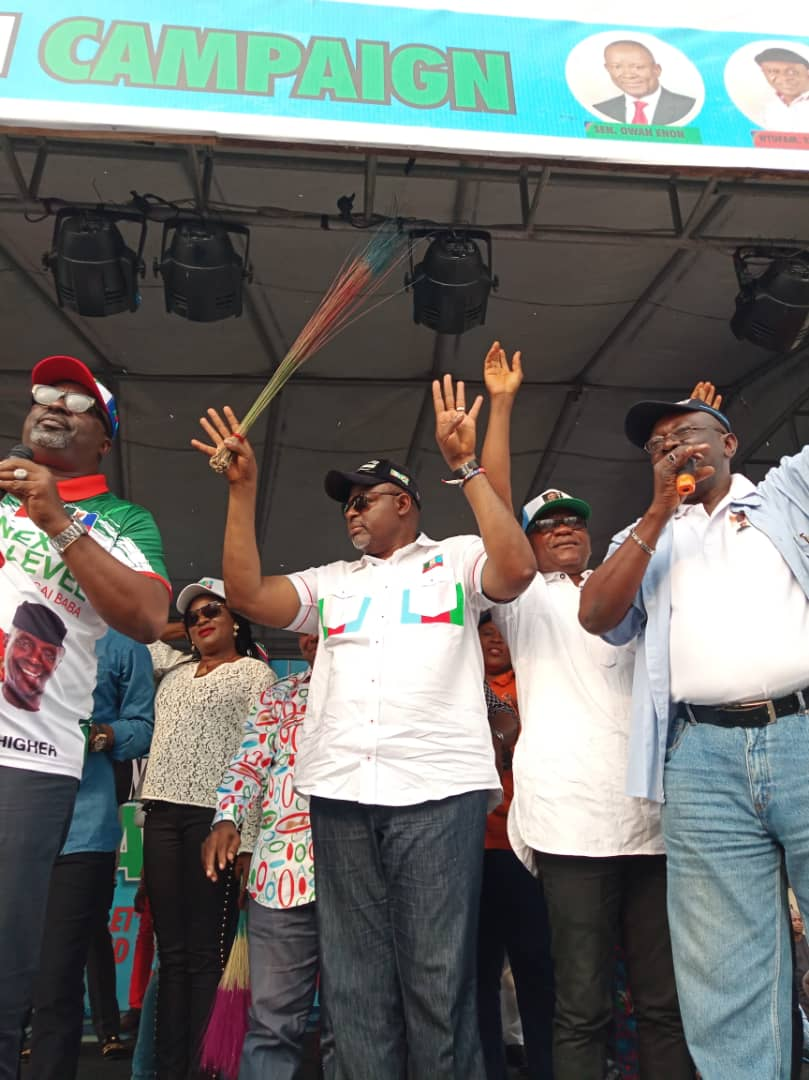
2019 Governorship/Presidential campaign

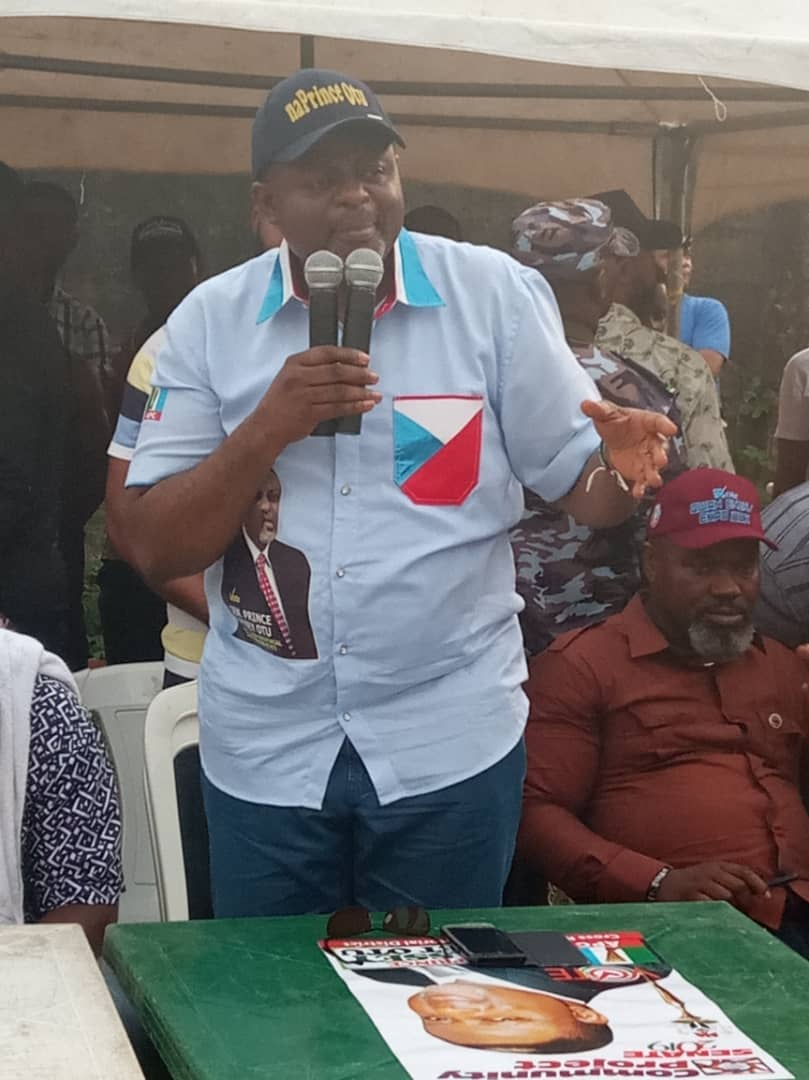
During Local government tour

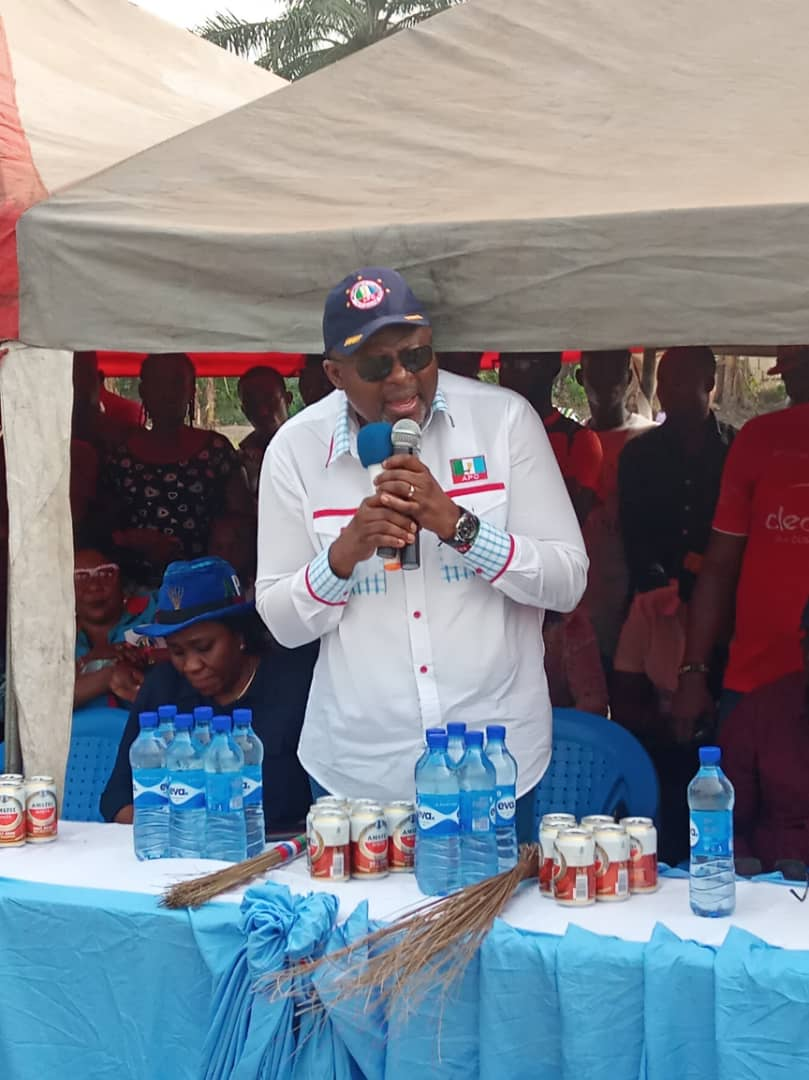
During the 2019 Ward to Ward campaign

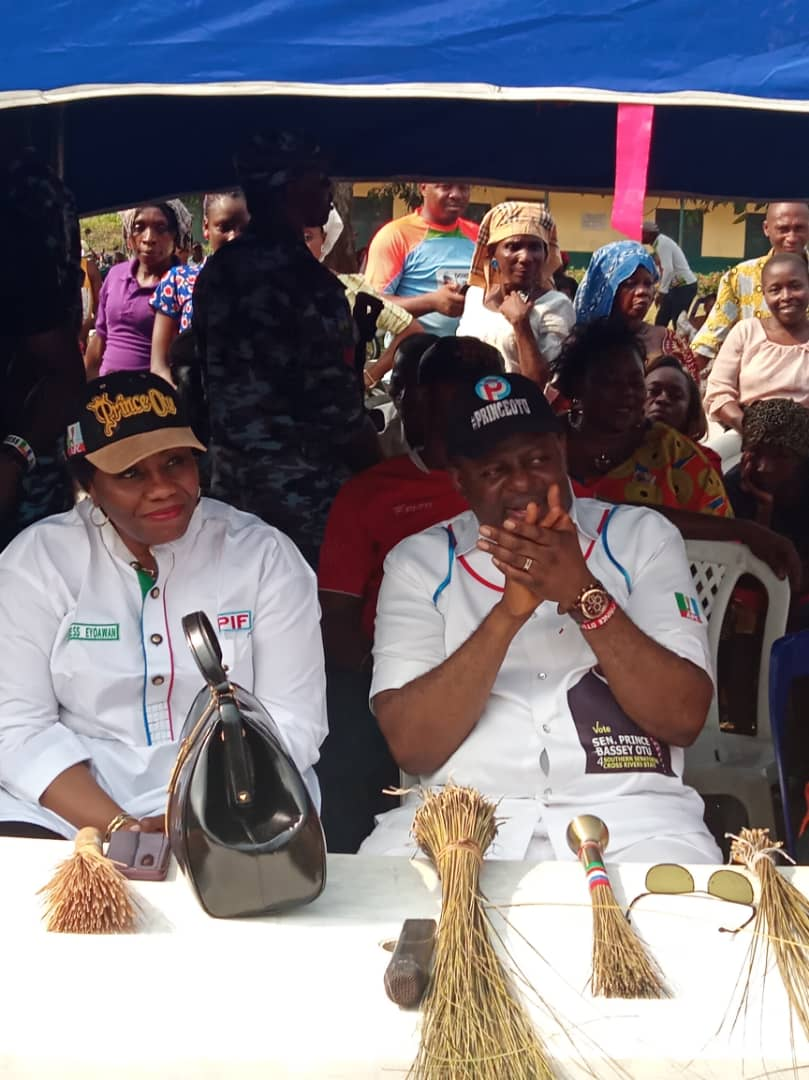
The senator at meeting with women supported by his Wife
