= Gershom Bassey =

Nigerian politician

Gershom Henry Bassey
- President: Muhammadu Buhari
- Vice President: Yemi Osinbajo
- Parliamentary group: ECOWAS Parliament

Member of the Senate of Nigeria for Cross River South
- Incumbent
- Assumed office 2019 - 2023

Member of the Senate of Nigeria for Cross River South
- In office 9 June 2015 – 9 June 2019

Chairman Cross River State Water Board
- In office 1999–2014

Personal details
- Born: 18 March 1962 (age 64) Lagos, Nigeria
- Citizenship: Nigeria
- Committees: Chairman, Senate Committee; FERMA, Vice Chairman, Senate Committee; Petroleum Resources (Upstream), Member, Senate Committee; Defence, Federal Character, National Planning, Local Content and Cooperation and Integration in Africa/NEPAD

Senator Chief Gershom Henry Bassey (born 18 March 1962 in Lagos, Nigeria) is a Nigerian politician and multi-millionaire businessman. He is the senator representing Cross River South Senatorial District in the Nigerian Senate. He is a senator of the 8th and 9th National Assembly in Nigeria respectively.

== Personal life and education ==
Gershom Bassey (born 18 March 1962) in Lagos, Nigeria, hails from Calabar South local government area of Cross River State. He is married to Chioma Gershom-Bassey with 5 children. Bassey attended Corona School Apapa, Lagos for his primary school then moved on to Federal Government College, Sokoto where he obtained his West African School Certificate in 1977. In 1979, he received his A-Level certificate from Greylands College, Isles of Wight, United Kingdom. He studied Engineering Production and Economics at University of Wales, Cardiff where he graduated with a 1st BSc in 1984. In 1986, he received an MSc in Construction Management from Brunel University London with a distinction. In 2000 he received an MBA from MIT Sloan school of management.

He is a fellow of the Nigerian Institute of Civil Engineers (NICE) and has received an award of recognition from the Nigerian Society of Engineers (NSE).

== Career ==
Bassey was the CEO of Lilleker Nigeria Nigeria form 1999 - 2010 and Chairman Cross River State Water Board in 1999–2015. Bassey started his political career when ran for Senate of the Cross River Southern Senatorial District 2015.On 9 June 2015 he was sworn into the 8th Nigerian Senate.On 11 June 2019 he was sworn into the 9th Nigerian Senate. He is ranked the 5th best senator in the Nigerian Senate. He has an estimated net worth of about $30 million putting him as one of the richest men in Cross River State. He also served as the Chairman of the Strategic Policy Committee in Cross River State. In 2014, Bassey declared his interest for the seat of the senate for Cross River south senatorial district. In 2015, he was elected Senator for Cross River South senatorial district. He was also appointed the Vice Chairman of the Senate committee on Petroleum Resources (Upstream). Bassey is now the Chairman of the Federal Roads Maintenance Agency ( FERMA ). This is the committee responsible for road maintenance in Nigeria.

In the run up to the 2019 elections during the People's Democratic Party primaries, Bassey reportedly had a confrontation with his opponent Ntufam Ekpo Okon which eventually led to a fight and postponement of the primaries by the Cross River State Senatorial Primary Election Committee. It was also reported that supporters of Ntufam Ekpo Okon attacked the motorcade of Bassey. Following the attack on Bassey, Ntufam Okon was disqualified by the Cross River State Senatorial Primary Election Committee and Bassey emerged the winner.

In February 2019, the election was held and Bassey emerged the winner.

=== Sponsored bills ===
During the 8th National Assembly, he sponsored several bills namely:

1. Correction, Reformation and Re-integration Centre (establishment, etc) Bill, 2016".

2. Federal College of Forestry Technology and Research, Akamkpa (establishment, etc) Bill

3. He sponsored a bill named "A Bill for an Act to amend the Criminal Justice (Release from Custody)(Special Provision) Act, CAP C40 LFN 2011 and for Other Related Matters", the bill progressed through to the second reading stage.

4. Other bills he sponsored that only went through the first reading are the "Fire (Hazard, Prevention and Safeguard) Bill", the "National Boundary Commission Act (Amendment) Bill", "Flags and Coat of Arms Act (Amendment) Bill", "Federal Polytechnic Akpabuyo (Est.etc.) Bill" and the "Nigerian Research Institute of Fisheries and Aquatic, Bakassi (Est.etc) Bill".,
