= Calabar Municipal =

Calabar Municipal Mfam Akin Ahen (QuaEjagham)
- LGA
- Nickname: kalabar
- Interactive map of Calabar Municipal
- Country: Nigeria
- State: Cross River State
- Capital: Calabar

Government
  - Local Government Chairman: James Koko Anam

Area
  - Total: 142 km^{2} (55 sq mi)

Population (2006)
  - Total: 179,392
  - Density: 1,260/km^{2} (3,270/sq mi)
- Time zone: UTC+1 (WAT)
- Postal code: 540
- Website: www.crossriverhub.com.ng/calabar-municipal

Calabar Municipal is a Local Government Area of Cross River State, Nigeria. Its headquarters are in the city of Calabar.

It has an area of 142 km^{2} and a population of 179,392 at the 2006 census.

The postal code of the area is 540.

== Monarch ==
The paramount ruler of Calabar Municipality is known as the Ndidem of the Quas and paramount ruler of Calabar municipality, he is the president of traditional rulers council in Calabar municipality and grand patriarch of Ejagham Nation.

== Prominent persons from Calabar Municipality ==
Senator Joseph Oqua Ansa, is the first person from Calabar Municipal Local Government Area (LGA) to be voted in as a senator representing Cross River State Southern Senatorial District at the Nigerian senate in 1979.
