= Etung =

- LGA
- Interactive map of Etung
- Country: Nigeria
- State: Cross River State
- Capital: Effraya

Government
  - Local Government Chairman: John Nkum Etuk

Area
  - Total: 815 km^{2} (315 sq mi)

Population (2006)
  - Total: 80,196
  - Density: 98.4/km^{2} (255/sq mi)
- Time zone: UTC+1 (WAT)
- Postal code: 551
- Website: www.crossriverhub.com.ng/etung

Etung is a Local Government Area of Cross River State, Nigeria. Its headquarters are in the town of Effraya.

It has an area of 815 km^{2} and a population of 80,196 at the 2006 census.

The postal code of the area is 551.

== Geography and economy ==
Etung Local Government Area spans about 815 square kilometres or 315 square miles and experiences two main seasons: a wet season and a dry one. The Cross River passes through the region, which maintains an average temperature of roughly 25 °C (77 °F). The area also records an annual rainfall of approximately 3,700 millimetres (150 inches).

In the Etung local government area, farming is a major economic activity. The region grows products such plantains, cassava, maize, oil palm, and cocoa. Etung LGA is known for being one of Nigeria's top producers of cocoa. Etung LGA's rivers and tributaries are abundant in seafood, making fishing a significant economic activity. Etung LGA is home to various markets where a wide range of goods are bought and sold, as well as lakes that are rich in salt. The LGA produces enormous amounts of salt for both industrial and consumer use.

== Gallery ==
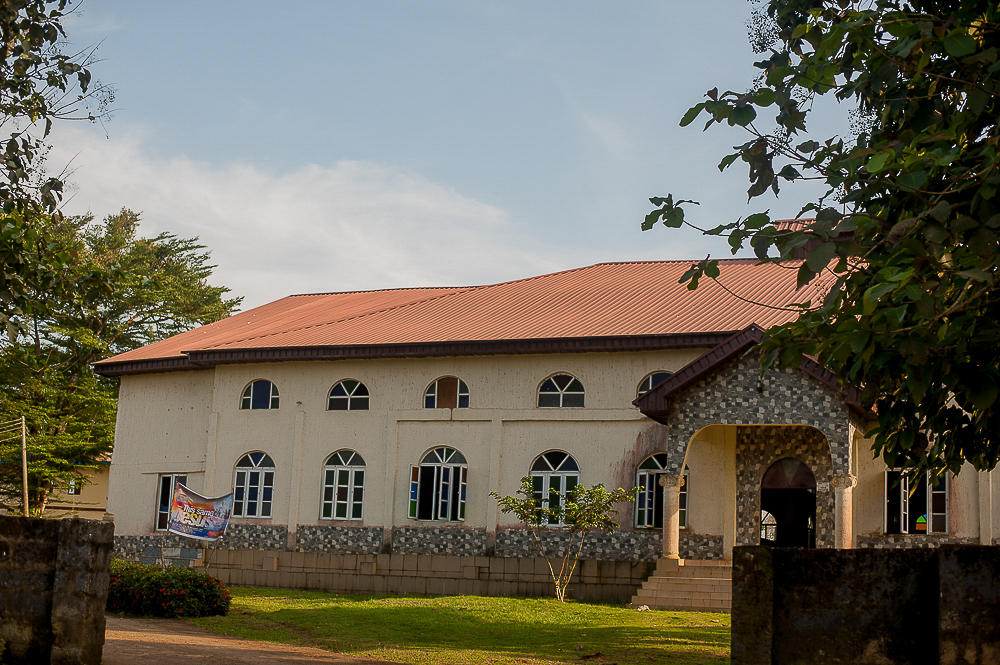

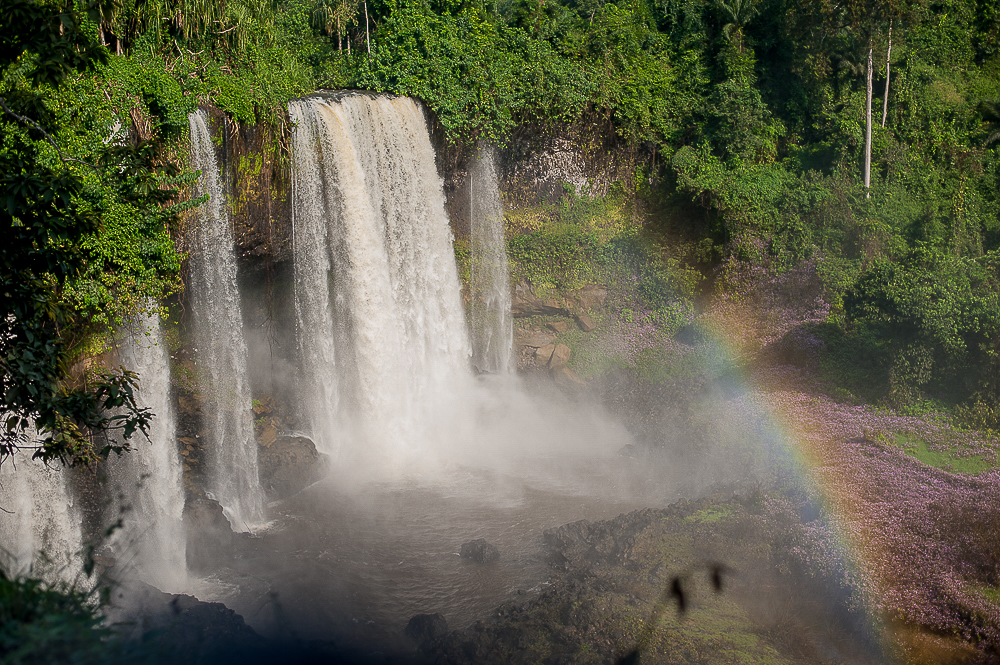
