= Calabar South =

- LGA
- Interactive map of Calabar South
- Country: Nigeria
- State: Cross River State
- Capital: Anantigha

Government
  - Local Government Chairman: Esther Bassey

Area
  - Total: 264 km^{2} (102 sq mi)

Population (2006)
  - Total: 191,630
  - Density: 726/km^{2} (1,880/sq mi)
- Time zone: UTC+1 (WAT)
- Postal code: 540
- Website: www.crossriverhub.com.ng/calabar-south

Calabar South is a Local Government Area of Cross River State, Nigeria. Its headquarters are In the town of Anantigha.

It has an area of 264 km^{2} and a population of 191,630 according to the 2006 census.

The postal code of the area is 540.

The local Government Headquarters are in Anantigha.

There are 12 local Government wards.

== Geography and economy ==
Calabar South LGA has an area of 264 square kilometres (or 102 square miles) and an 81 percent humidity level. With an average temperature of 25 degrees Celsius (or 77 degrees Fahrenheit), the LGA experiences two distinct seasons: the dry and the wet.

Numerous crops are farmed in Calabar South LGA, making agriculture a significant aspect of the region's economy. There are also several markets in the region, including the well-known Watt Market, and trade flourishes there.
