= Ben Ayade =

Nigerian politician (born 1968)

Ben Ayade CON
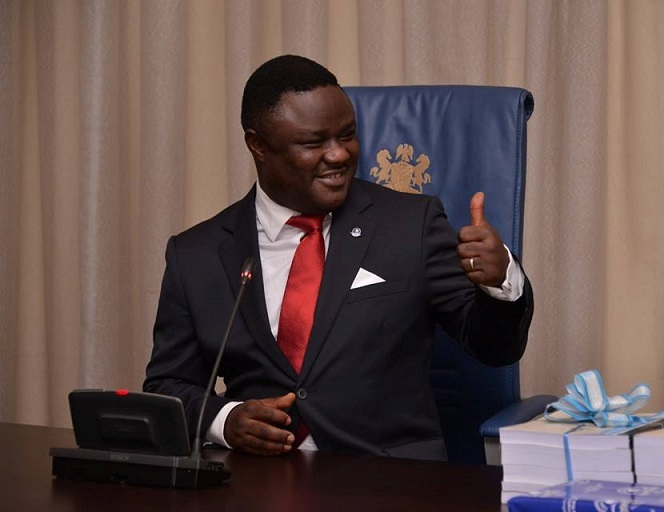

Governor of Cross River State
- In office 29 May 2015 – 29 May 2023
- Deputy: Ivara Esu
- Preceded by: Liyel Imoke
- Succeeded by: Bassey Edet Otu

Senator for Cross River North
- In office 6 June 2011 – 29 May 2015
- Succeeded by: Rose Oko

Personal details
- Born: Benedict Bengiuoshuye Ayade; 2 March 1968 (age 58) Kakum, Cross River State, Nigeria
- Party: All Progressives Congress (2021–present)
- Other political affiliations: Peoples Democratic Party (2011–2021)
- Spouse: Linda Ayade
- Children: 3
- Education: St. Stephens Primary School
- Alma mater: University of Ibadan; Ambrose Alli University; Delta State University
- Profession: Politician; lawyer; environmentalist
- Website: senatorbenayade.org

Benedict Bengiuoshuye Ayade CON (born 2 March 1968) is a Nigerian politician who served as the governor of Cross River State from 2015 to 2023. He served as Senator for Cross River North from 2011 to 2015.

== Early life ==
He was born in Obudu LGA of Cross River State on 2 March 1968 to Peter Akinsheye Ayade and Beatrice Ngayi Ayade. He hails from Kakum Village, Ipong Ward of Obudu Local Government Area of Cross River State, Nigeria. His parents were both devout Catholics. His father worked as a public servant with the water board.

== Education ==
Benedict Ayade received his primary education at St. Stephens Primary School, Obudu, and proceeded to Government Secondary School, Obudu, Nigeria, for his secondary education.

Ayade earned his B.Sc. (Honours) from Ambrose Ali University in [Ekpoma], Nigeria (1984–1988). He then proceeded to obtain his M.Sc. in microbiology (1989–1990) and subsequently his Ph.D. in environmental microbiology from the same University of Ibadan (1990–1994), winning the Best Doctoral Dissertation Award in Environmental Microbiology. Ayade also has an MBA (2000–2002) from Ambrose Alli University Ekpoma, Edo State. Ayade is a lawyer with an LL.B. law degree (2006–2010) from Delta State University, Abraka. Ayade went on to work as a lecturer at Delta State University, Abraka, where he was subsequently appointed professor. Ayade has also obtained a Masters Degree (LL.B) in Law from the University of Calabar, Cross River State, Nigeria..

From his work in groundwater remediation in Nigeria, Ayade invented a sewage treatment plant powered by solar energy.

== Appointments/political career ==
- Chairman of Ecological Fund
- Chairman of International Institute of Environmental Research
- Member of Strategic Policy Advisory Council
- Member of Nigeria Association of Petroleum Engineers
- Member of Cross River State Poverty Alleviation Board

Ayade ventured into politics when he ran for a seat in the Nigerian Senate in the 2011 elections as a member of the PDP. Ayade was elected by accumulating a total of 91,123 votes.

During his term in the Senate, Ayade held the position of vice-chairman, Senate Committee on Environment and Ecology. He was also a member of other committees such as Petroleum Downstream, Education, Drugs/Narcotics/Crime etc.

Ayade won the gubernatorial poll again on the platform of the People's Democratic Party (PDP) in the April 2015 elections in Cross River State, having polled 342,016 votes ahead of the All Progressives Congress candidate in the state, Odey Ochicha, with 53,983 votes.

Ayade recontested in the 2019 gubernatorial elections as a member of the People Democratic Party (PDP) and was reelected as the governor of Cross River State.

During his last year as governor, Ayade contested the 2023 Cross River North Senate Seat and lost to Sen. Jarigbe Agom.

== Awards ==
Ayade was awarded the 2016 Vanguard Governor of the Year.

Ayade was awarded the 2019 Champion Newspaper Governor of the Year.

Ayade was awarded the 2020 Leadership newspaper Governor of the year.

Ayade was also awarded the Blueprint Newspaper Governor of the Year on Agro-industrialization 2021. The award was in recognition of his developmental strides on Agro-industrialization.

On 24 August 2019, Ayade was invested as the Knight of St. John (KSJ) International by the Roman Catholic Church, Sacred Heart Cathedral, the seat of the Metropolitan Archdiocese of Calabar.

In October 2022, he was awarded a national honour of Commander of the Order of the Niger (CON) by President Muhammadu Buhari.

== Family and personal life ==
Ayade is married to Dr. Linda Ayade and has 3 children. His hobbies include reading, playing and watching games, as well as dancing.

== See also ==
- List of governors of Cross River State
