= Ogoja =

Local government area in Cross River State, Nigeria

- Town and local government area
- Interactive map of Ogoja
- Location in Nigeria
- Coordinates: 6°30′N 8°40′E
- Country: Nigeria
- State: Cross River State

Government
  - Local Government Chairman: Emmanuel Ishabor

Area
  - Total: 972 km^{2} (375 sq mi)

Population (2006 census)
  - Total: 171,901
  - Density: 177/km^{2} (458/sq mi)
- Time zone: UTC+1 (WAT)
- 3-digit postal code prefix: 550
- Area code: 045
- ISO 3166 code: NG.CR.OG
- Website: www.crossriverhub.com.ng/ogoja

Ogoja is a town and local government area near the A4 highway at 6°39′17″N 8°47′51″E in Cross River State, Nigeria.

It has an area of 972 km^{2} and a population of 171,901 at the 2006 census.

St. Benedict's Cathedral, Ogoja, is the episcopal see of the Roman Catholic Diocese of Ogoja.

The postal code of the area is 550.

== History ==
The town was one of the provinces during colonial times. It consists of many tribal units, including Ishibori (this village has different clans such as Uhmuria, Ikaptang, Ikajor, Ishinyema, Ikariku, Imerakorm) and Igoli as the central town.

Mbube, being one of the major tribes, comprises different villages, including: Odajie, Ekumtak, Idum, Ojerim, Egbe, Ogberia Ogang & Ogberia Ochoro, Oboso, Benkpe, Edide, Bansan, Aragban, Nkim, etc. Their major source of livelihood is subsistence agriculture, basically farming of cassava, yams, palm oil, palm wine etc.

Ekajuk is one of the major clans in Ogoja Local government area. It is divided into Ward I and Ward II, and includes major communities such as Nwang, Ekpogrinya, Esham, Egbong, Nnang, Ewinimba and Bansara (which are collection of a group of villages).

== Climate ==
In Ogoja, the dry season is hot, muggy, and partly cloudy whereas the wet season is warm, oppressive, and overcast. The average annual temperature fluctuates between 18 °C (65 °F) and 32 °C (90 °F), rarely falling below 16 °C (60 °F) or rising above 34 °C (93 °F).

The distinction between hot and cold seasons in Ogoja is somewhat arbitrary because the city's temperature hardly changes from one season to the next.

Climate data for Ogoja (1991–2020)
Month	Jan	Feb	Mar	Apr	May	Jun	Jul	Aug	Sep	Oct	Nov	Dec	Year
Record high °C (°F)	39.4 (102.9)	40.4 (104.7)	41 (106)	40.4 (104.7)	38 (100)	36.2 (97.2)	36 (97)	34.2 (93.6)	34.8 (94.6)	35.5 (95.9)	37.5 (99.5)	38 (100)	41.0 (105.8)
Mean daily maximum °C (°F)	34.9 (94.8)	36.7 (98.1)	36.6 (97.9)	34.8 (94.6)	33.1 (91.6)	31.8 (89.2)	30.6 (87.1)	30.1 (86.2)	31.0 (87.8)	32.0 (89.6)	33.7 (92.7)	34.7 (94.5)	33.3 (91.9)
Daily mean °C (°F)	27.5 (81.5)	29.3 (84.7)	30.1 (86.2)	29.1 (84.4)	28.0 (82.4)	27.3 (81.1)	26.6 (79.9)	26.2 (79.2)	26.8 (80.2)	27.3 (81.1)	28.1 (82.6)	27.0 (80.6)	27.8 (82.0)
Mean daily minimum °C (°F)	20.2 (68.4)	21.9 (71.4)	23.7 (74.7)	23.5 (74.3)	22.9 (73.2)	22.7 (72.9)	22.6 (72.7)	22.4 (72.3)	22.5 (72.5)	22.6 (72.7)	22.5 (72.5)	19.4 (66.9)	22.2 (72.0)
Record low °C (°F)	9 (48)	9 (48)	13 (55)	15 (59)	13 (55)	17 (63)	18 (64)	17 (63)	16 (61)	17 (63)	14 (57)	9 (48)	9.0 (48.2)
Average precipitation mm (inches)	8.7 (0.34)	11.1 (0.44)	34.9 (1.37)	139.0 (5.47)	276.3 (10.88)	284.4 (11.20)	280.1 (11.03)	269.3 (10.60)	351.4 (13.83)	290.1 (11.42)	30.5 (1.20)	6.5 (0.26)	1,982.2 (78.04)
Average precipitation days (≥ 1.0 mm)	0.4	0.9	2.3	7.2	13.9	14.1	15.1	15.4	17.4	14.8	1.9	0.3	103.8
Average relative humidity (%)	67.8	71.5	81.4	85.8	88.1	89.5	90.0	90.1	90.6	90.3	83.0	72.0	83.4
Source: NOAA

=== Clouds ===
The average proportion of sky covered by clouds in Ogoja varies significantly seasonally throughout the year.

In Ogoja, the clearer season starts about November 17 and lasts for 3.1 months, coming to a finish around February 22. December is the clearest month of the year, with the sky remaining clear, mostly clear, or partly overcast 44% of the time.

Beginning about February 22 and lasting for 8.9 months, the cloudier season ends around November 17.

May is the cloudiest month of the year in Ogoja, with the sky being overcast or mostly cloudy 86% of the time on average.

=== Precipitation ===
A day is considered to be wet if there has been at least 0.04 inches of liquid or liquid-equivalent precipitation. In Ogoja, the likelihood of rainy days fluctuates a great deal from season to season.

The 7.4-month wetter season, which runs from March 25 to November 6, has a probability of precipitation of more than 43% on any one day. With an average of 25.1 days with at least 1.0 millimetre (0.04 in) of precipitation, September is the month with the most rainy days in Ogoja.

From November 6 to March 25, the drier season lasts 4.6 months. With an average of 0.7 days with at least 1.0 millimetre (0.04 in) of precipitation, December is the month with the fewest wet days in Ogoja.

We categorize wet days into those that include snow, rain, or a combination of the three. In Ogoja, September has an average of 25.1 days of rain, which is the most of any month. According to this classification, rain alone is the most frequent type of precipitation throughout the year, with a high likelihood of 85% on October 1.

== Present administration ==
Currently, Ogoja has three arms of government, namely: executive, legislature and judiciary. The executive arm is made up of an elected chairman, a deputy chairman and supervisors. They are appointed by the chairman and confirmed by the legislature. The current chairman is Hon. Christopher Agbeh.

The legislative arm comprises ten Councillors who represent the ten wards in Ogoja.

The judiciary is headed by the Chief Judge of Ogoja.

Ogoja is a town of many reputable families such as the Egabes, the Ogabis, the Aggreys, the Anyias, the Ntajis, the Ogabos, the Ukpos, the Uga-ifus, the Amus, and the Moffis.

Ogoja is home to the Federal College of Science.

== Transportation ==
Bebi Airport, a small airstrip, is close to Ogoja.
