= 2023 Nigerian Senate elections in Cross River State =

2023 Senate elections in Cross River

- 25 February 2023

All 3 Cross River State seats in the Senate of Nigeria
	Majority party
Party	PDP
Last election	3
Seats before	3
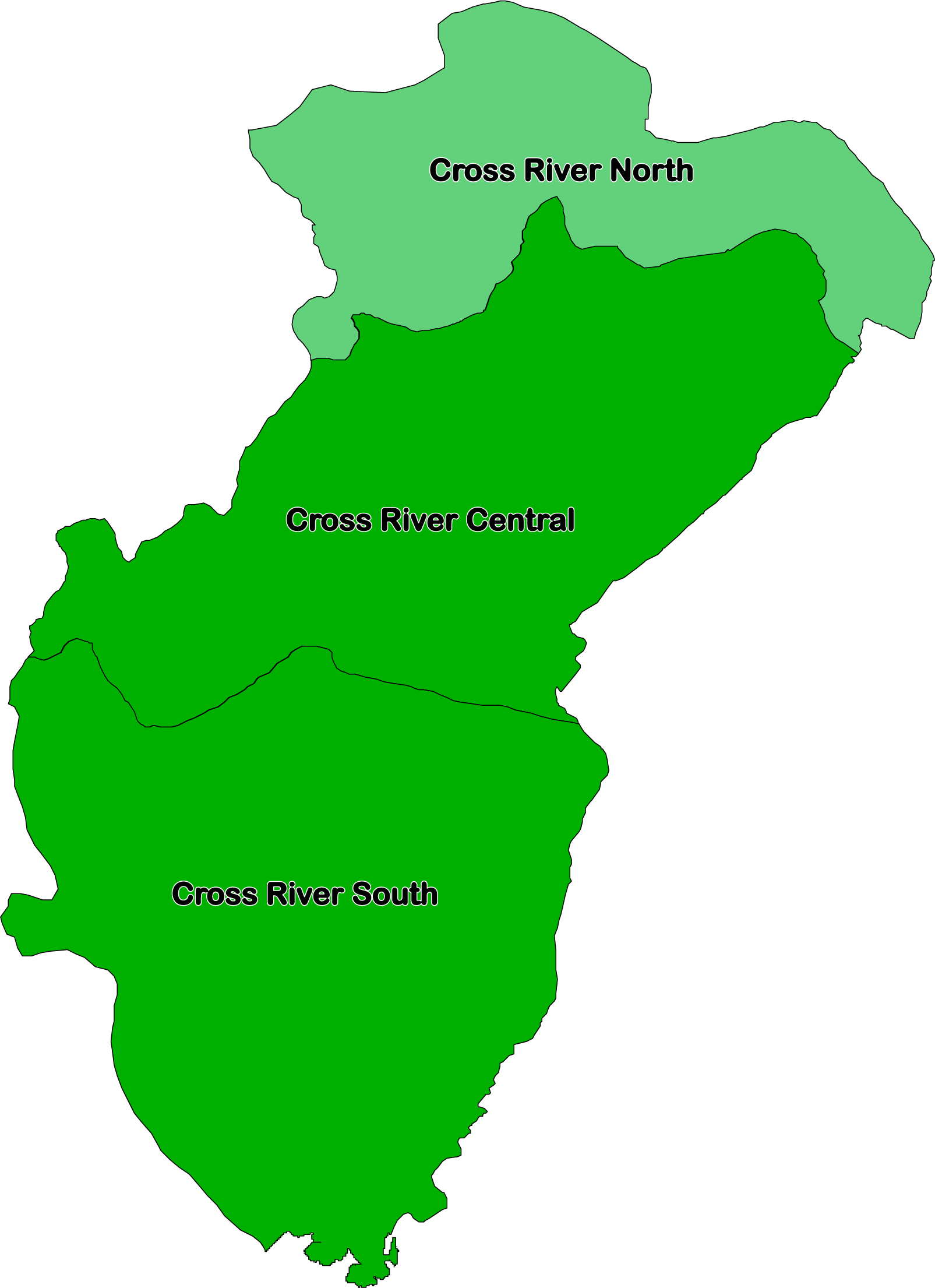
- PDP incumbent retiring PDP incumbent running for re-election

The 2023 Nigerian Senate elections in Cross River State will be held on 25 February 2023, to elect the 3 federal Senators from Cross River State, one from each of the state's three senatorial districts. The elections will coincide with the 2023 presidential election, as well as other elections to the Senate and elections to the House of Representatives; with state elections being held two weeks later. Primaries were held between 4 April and 9 June 2022.

== Background ==
In the previous Senate elections, two of three incumbent senators were returned with John Owan Enoh (APC-Central) retiring to unsuccessfully run for governor while Rose Okoji Oko (PDP-North) and Gershom Bassey (PDP-South) were re-elected. In the Central district, Sandy Ojang Onor regained the seat for the PDP with 57% of the vote; the PDP held the other two seats as Oko was re-elected with 73% of the vote in the North while Bassey was returned with 55% in the South district. These results were a part of a continuation of the PDP's control of the state as Governor Benedict Ayade was re-elected with over 73% of the vote in the gubernatorial election and the party won every seat in the House of Assembly. However, the PDP did lose one House of Representatives seat to the APC and although the state was easily won by PDP presidential nominee Atiku Abubakar, it still swung towards Buhari compared to 2015 and had lower turnout.

During the term, much of the news about Cross River senators focused on the Northern seat as Oko died in March 2020 with the legal and political battles over the ensuing by-election took place over a year. After disputed PDP primaries, Stephen Odey initially won the seat and was sworn in but courts later ruled in MHR Agom Jarigbe's favour and he took office in September 2021.

== Overview ==
Affiliation	Party		Total
Affiliation	PDP	APC	Total
Previous Election	3	0	3
Before Election	3	0	3
After Election	1	2	3

== Summary ==
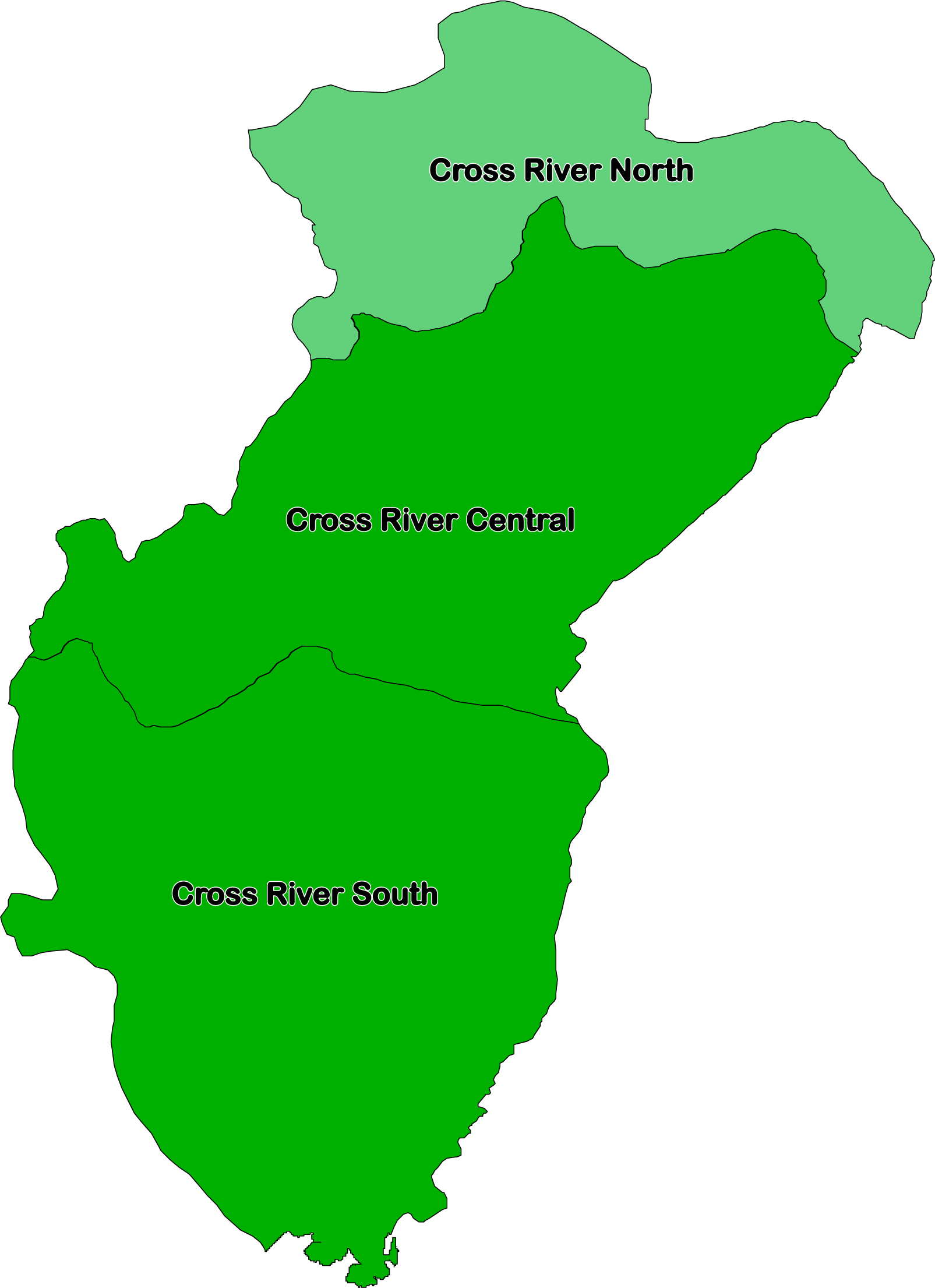
PDP incumbent retiring PDP incumbent running

District	Incumbent		Results	
District	Incumbent	Party	Status	Candidates
Cross River Central	Sandy Ojang Onor	PDP	Incumbent retired New member elected APC gain	▌ ✓ Eteng Williams (APC); ▌Bassey Ewa (PDP)
Cross River North	Agom Jarigbe	PDP	Incumbent re-elected	▌Benedict Ayade (APC); ▌ ✓ Agom Jarigbe (PDP)
Cross River South	Gershom Bassey	PDP	Incumbent retired New member elected APC gain	▌ ✓ Asuquo Ekpenyong (APC); ▌Ekpo Okon (PDP)

== Cross River Central ==
2023 Cross River Central Senatorial District election
- 25 February 2023
Nominee	Eteng Williams	Bassey Ewa
Party	APC	PDP
Senator before election
Sandy Ojang Onor
PDP
Elected Senator
TBD

The Cross River Central Senatorial District covers the local government areas of Abi, Boki, Etung, Ikom, Obubra, and Yakurr. The incumbent Sandy Ojang Onor (PDP) was elected with 56.6% of the vote in 2019. In March 2022, Onor announced that he would run for governor of Cross River State instead of seeking re-election.

=== Primary elections ===
==== All Progressives Congress ====
On 20 April 2022, the APC National Executive Committee announced the party's schedule for senatorial primaries, setting its expression of interest form price at ₦3 million and nomination form price at ₦17 million with a 50% discount for candidates younger than 40 while women and candidates with disabilities get free nomination forms. Forms were to be sold from 26 April to 6 May until the deadline was later extended to 10 May then 12 May. After the submission of nomination forms by 13 May, candidates were screened by a party committee on 14 and 15 May while 18 May was the date for the screening appeal process. Ward congresses and LGA congresses were set for 16 and 17 May to elect delegates for the primary. Candidates approved by the screening process advanced to a primary set for 27 May, in concurrence with other APC senatorial primaries; challenges to the result could be made on 28 May.

On the primary date, an indirect primary in Ikom resulted in the victory of Eteng Williams—the Speaker of the Cross River State House of Assembly and MHA for Yakurr II. Williams beat first runner-up Akin Ricketts, the chairman of the Board of the Nigerian Ports Authority, by a 14% margin. Like other APC senatorial primary winners, Williams was noted for being an ally of Governor Benedict Ayade; the primary itself was rejected by another candidate, Okoi Obono-Obla. Months later in early December, a Federal High Court ruling annulled the primaries and ordered a rerun exercise. The rerun primary was conducted on 17 December, with it also resulting in the nomination of Williams over his opponents. Nevertheless, aspirant Mary Ekpere returned to court in an attempt to disqualify Williams and first runner-up John Inyang then declared herself as victor.

Annulled primary results

APC primary results
Party	Candidate	Votes	%
APC	Eteng Williams	152	48.26%
APC	Akin Ricketts	109	34.60%
APC	Mary Ekpere	35	11.11%
APC	Okoi Obono-Obla	19	6.03%
Total votes		315	100.00%

APC rerun primary results
Party	Candidate	Votes	%
APC	Eteng Williams	270	88.52%
APC	John Inyang	27	8.85%
APC	Mary Ekpere	7	2.30%
APC	Akin Ricketts	1	0.33%
Total votes		305	100.00%
Invalid or blank votes		3	N/A
Turnout		308	93.3%

==== People's Democratic Party ====
On 16 March 2022, the national PDP announced its senatorial primary timetable, setting its expression of interest form price at ₦1 million and the nomination form price at ₦20 million with a 50% discount for candidates between 25 and 30. Forms were to be sold until 1 April but the party later extended the deadline four times before reaching a final deadline of 22 April. After the submission of nomination forms by 25 April, candidates were screened by a party committee on 27 April while 2 May was the rescheduled date for the screening appeal process. Ward congresses were set for 29 April and LGA congresses were rescheduled for 10 May to elect delegates for the primary. Candidates approved by the screening process advanced to a primary set for 23 May, in concurrence with other PDP senatorial primaries but due to often violently enforced Monday stay-at-home orders by separatists, southeastern state parties held their primaries on 24 May; challenges to the result could be made on 25 May.

On the primary date, candidates contested a direct primary that ended with Bassey Ewa winning the nomination after results showed him defeating former commissioner Goddy Eta by a narrow margin of eight votes.

PDP primary results
Party	Candidate	Votes	%
PDP	Bassey Ewa	102	51.26%
PDP	Godwin Ettah	94	47.23%
PDP	Wilfred Usani	3	1.51%
PDP	Other candidates	0	0.00%
Total votes		199	100.00%

=== General election ===
==== Results ====
2023 Cross River Central Senatorial District election
Party	Candidate	Votes	%
AA	Roland Bassey Igboke		
ADC	Uti Uwana		
APC	Eteng Williams		
LP	Patrick Okomiso		
New Nigeria Peoples Party	Samuel Ubana Eno		
PRP	Simon Ebuta Akor		
PDP	Bassey Ewa		
SDP	Dominion Winner Esang		
YPP	Anthony Bissiong Attah		
Total votes			100.00%
Invalid or blank votes			N/A
Turnout			

== Cross River North ==
2023 Cross River North Senatorial District election
- 25 February 2023
Nominee	Benedict Ayade	Agom Jarigbe
Party	APC	PDP
Senator before election
Agom Jarigbe
PDP
Elected Senator
TBD

The Cross River North Senatorial District covers the local government areas of Bekwarra, Biase, Obanliku, Obudu, Ogoja, and Yala. In 2019, Rose Okoji Oko (PDP) was re-elected to the seat with 73.3% of the vote. Oko died in March 2020, leading to a by-election in December 2020. Although the PDP won the by-election, a dispute over the legitimate PDP primary victor between Agom Jarigbe and Stephen Odey delayed the inauguration; Odey won both initial court decisions and took office late in December 2020. However, Jarigbe later won several court challenges which declared him the legitimate PDP nominee and thus Senator; he took office in September 2021. Jarigbe is seeking re-election.

=== Primary elections ===
==== All Progressives Congress ====
On 20 April 2022, the APC National Executive Committee announced the party's schedule for senatorial primaries, setting its expression of interest form price at ₦3 million and nomination form price at ₦17 million with a 50% discount for candidates younger than 40 while women and candidates with disabilities get free nomination forms. Forms were to be sold from 26 April to 6 May until the deadline was later extended to 10 May then 12 May. After the submission of nomination forms by 13 May, candidates were screened by a party committee on 14 and 15 May while 18 May was the date for the screening appeal process. Ward congresses and LGA congresses were set for 16 and 17 May to elect delegates for the primary. Candidates approved by the screening process advanced to a primary set for 27 May, in concurrence with other APC senatorial primaries; challenges to the result could be made on 28 May.

On the primary date, the indirect primary at the Liyel Imoke Pavilion in Ogoja ended with Martins Orim—former Chief of Staff to the Cross River State Government—emerging as the nominee unanimously. Like other APC senatorial primary winners, Orim was noted for being an ally of Governor Benedict Ayade, having been on the "oga's list" of Ayade's anointed candidates. The other candidate, Cecilia Adams, boycotted the Pavilion primary and held a parallel primary in which she won. However, the APC recognized the Pavilion primary and accepted Orim as the legitimate nominee until he withdrew from the nomination in July. The withdrawal led to a new primary in Ogoja, won by Ayade himself unopposed after the failure of his presidential campaign. In his acceptance speech, Ayade thanked delegates and vowed to return to the Senate. Although Adams challenged the primary in court, her case was dismissed in February 2023.

Original primary results

APC primary results
Party	Candidate	Votes	%
APC	Eteng Williams	254	100.00%
APC	Cecilia Adams	0	0.00%
Total votes		254	100.00%
Invalid or blank votes		1	N/A
Turnout		255	Unknown

APC rerun primary results
Party	Candidate	Votes	%
APC	Benedict Ayade	252	100.00%
Total votes		252	100.00%
Invalid or blank votes		3	N/A
Turnout		255	Unknown

==== People's Democratic Party ====
On 16 March 2022, the national PDP announced its senatorial primary timetable, setting its expression of interest form price at ₦1 million and the nomination form price at ₦20 million with a 50% discount for candidates between 25 and 30. Forms were to be sold until 1 April but the party later extended the deadline four times before reaching a final deadline of 22 April. After the submission of nomination forms by 25 April, candidates were screened by a party committee on 27 April while 2 May was the rescheduled date for the screening appeal process. Ward congresses were set for 29 April and LGA congresses were rescheduled for 10 May to elect delegates for the primary. Candidates approved by the screening process advanced to a primary set for 23 May, in concurrence with other PDP senatorial primaries but due to often violently enforced Monday stay-at-home orders by separatists, southeastern state parties held their primaries on 24 May; challenges to the result could be made on 25 May.

On the primary date, an indirect primary ended with Jarigbe's renomination as he was unopposed.

=== Campaign ===
Opponents of Ayade noted the lack of development in the district throughout his first term as senator and two terms as governor as rationale to vote against him.

=== General election ===
==== Results ====
2023 Cross River North Senatorial District election
Party	Candidate	Votes	%
AA	Peter Banbeshie Ikwen		
ADC	John Ogar		
APC	Benedict Ayade		
APM	Joseph Odey Adula		
LP	Gboshe Aganyi Gboshe		
New Nigeria Peoples Party	Carolyn Williams Okem		
PRP	Williams Ibu		
PDP	Agom Jarigbe		
SDP	Gabriel Abbas Abuashe		
YPP	Unimke Kenneth Ogar		
Total votes			100.00%
Invalid or blank votes			N/A
Turnout			

== Cross River South ==
2023 Cross River South Senatorial District election
- 25 February 2023
Nominee	Asuquo Ekpenyong	Ekpo Okon
Party	APC	PDP
Senator before election
Gershom Bassey
PDP
Elected Senator
TBD

The Cross River South Senatorial District covers the local government areas of Akamkpa, Akpabuyo, Bakassi, Calabar Municipal, Calabar South, and Odukpani. The incumbent Gershom Bassey (PDP) was re-elected with 54.5% of the vote in 2019. In March 2022, Onor announced that he would run for governor of Cross River State instead of seeking re-election; he was defeated in the PDP gubernatorial primary.

=== Primary elections ===
==== All Progressives Congress ====
On 20 April 2022, the APC National Executive Committee announced the party's schedule for senatorial primaries, setting its expression of interest form price at ₦3 million and nomination form price at ₦17 million with a 50% discount for candidates younger than 40 while women and candidates with disabilities get free nomination forms. Forms were to be sold from 26 April to 6 May until the deadline was later extended to 10 May then 12 May. After the submission of nomination forms by 13 May, candidates were screened by a party committee on 14 and 15 May while 18 May was the date for the screening appeal process. Ward congresses and LGA congresses were set for 16 and 17 May to elect delegates for the primary. Candidates approved by the screening process advanced to a primary set for 27 May, in concurrence with other APC senatorial primaries; challenges to the result could be made on 28 May.

Two candidates contested in the primary that ended with Asuquo Ekpenyong—former state Commissioner for Finance—emerging as the nominee unanimously. Ekpenyong thanked his supporters in his acceptance speech. Like other APC senatorial primary winners, Ekpenyong was noted for being an ally of Governor Benedict Ayade, having been on the "oga's list" of Ayade's anointed candidates.

APC primary results
Party	Candidate	Votes	%
APC	Asuquo Ekpenyong	347	100.00%
APC	Victor Effiom Ekpo (withdrawn)	0	0.00%
Total votes		347	100.00%
Invalid or blank votes		4	N/A
Turnout		351	100.00%

==== People's Democratic Party ====
On 16 March 2022, the national PDP announced its senatorial primary timetable, setting its expression of interest form price at ₦1 million and the nomination form price at ₦20 million with a 50% discount for candidates between 25 and 30. Forms were to be sold until 1 April but the party later extended the deadline four times before reaching a final deadline of 22 April. After the submission of nomination forms by 25 April, candidates were screened by a party committee on 27 April while 2 May was the rescheduled date for the screening appeal process. Ward congresses were set for 29 April and LGA congresses were rescheduled for 10 May to elect delegates for the primary. Candidates approved by the screening process advanced to a primary set for 23 May, in concurrence with other PDP senatorial primaries but due to often violently enforced Monday stay-at-home orders by separatists, southeastern state parties held their primaries on 24 May; challenges to the result could be made on 25 May.

On the primary date, two candidates contested a direct primary that ended with Ekpo Okon—former state PDP chairman—winning the nomination after results showed him defeating Joseph Edet by a 60% margin. After the primary, Edet conceded and accepted the results while Okon commended PDP internal democracy during the process.

PDP primary results
Party	Candidate	Votes	%
PDP	Ekpo Okon	186	79.83%
PDP	Joseph Edet	47	20.17%
Total votes		233	100.00%
Invalid or blank votes		1	N/A
Turnout		234	99.57%

=== Campaign ===
In a January 2023 overview of legislative races in the South South, reporters from Vanguard noted key issues for the campaigns of Okon—he was caught in between the blocs of the state PDP with his longtime allies (former governors Liyel Imoke and Donald Duke) on one side while the PDP gubernatorial nominee Sandy Ojang Onor was on the other side—and disputed LP nominee Daniel Effiong Asuquo—some people blamed his refusal to withdraw from the PDP gubernatorial primary as the cause of Bassey's defeat.

=== General election ===
==== Results ====
2023 Cross River South Senatorial District election
Party	Candidate	Votes	%
ADC	Josee Offiong		
APC	Asuquo Ekpenyong		
APGA	Ukpong Chuwang Daniel		
APM	Gloria Odidi Orok		
LP	Daniel Effiong Asuquo		
New Nigeria Peoples Party	Ayi Etim Ekpenyown		
PRP	Celestine Awor Inyang		
PDP	Ekpo Okon		
SDP	Newton Bassey Edet		
YPP	Andem Archibong Ekeng		
Total votes			100.00%
Invalid or blank votes			N/A
Turnout			

== See also ==
- 2023 Nigerian Senate election
- 2023 Nigerian elections
