= Bassey =

Bassey is a common surname and given name of Efik and Ibibio origin, two ethnic groups in Southern Nigeria. It is an anglicisation of their word for God, Abasi, though in pre-colonial times Abasi was the leader of a pantheon as opposed to the Abrahamic God. Notable people with the name include:

== Surname ==
- Aniekan Bassey, Nigerian businessman and politician
- Anthony Bassey (born 1994), Nigerian footballer
- Beebee Bassey (born 1993), Nigerian musician
- Calvin Bassey, (born 1999), Nigerian footballer
- Charles Bassey (born 2000), Nigerian basketball player
- Ebbe Bassey, Nigerian-American actress
- Effiom Otu Bassey (born 1992), Nigerian footballer
- Ekemini Bassey (born 1987), Austrian bobsledder
- Eric Bassey (born 1983), American football player
- Essang Bassey (born 1998), American football player
- Essiën Bassey (born 2006), Ghanaian footballer
- Ezekiel Bassey (born 1996), Nigerian footballer
- Felicia Bassey, Nigerian politician
- Fortune Bassey (born 1998), Nigerian footballer
- Gershom Bassey (born 1962), Nigerian businessman and politician
- Hogan Bassey (1932–1998), Nigerian boxer
- Ironbar Bassey (born 1965), Nigerian weightlifter
- Jennifer Bassey (born 1942), American actress
- Mark Bassey (born 1961), British musician, composer and educator
- Michael Bassey (born 1987), Nigerian footballer
- Nathaniel Bassey (born 1981), Nigerian singer, songwriter and pastor
- Nonso Bassey, Nigerian singer, songwriter, actor and model
- Nnimmo Bassey (born 1958), Nigerian architect, activist and writer
- Otuekong Raphael Bassey (died 2025), Nigerian politician
- Patrick Bassey (1957–2020), Nigerian weightlifter
- Paul Bassey (born 1958), Nigerian journalist and sports administrator
- Samuel Bassey, Nigerian trade unionist and activist
- Shirley Bassey (born 1937), Welsh singer
- Simon Bassey (born 1976), English footballer and manager
- Sonia Bassey (born 1965), British artist and community organiser

== Given name ==
- Bassey Ekpo Bassey (born 1949), Nigerian journalist and politician
- Bassey Akiba (born 1969), Nigerian politician
- Bassey Akpan (born 1984), Nigerian footballer
- Bassey Asuquo, Nigerian military general and politician
- Bassey Albert Akpan (born 1972), Nigerian politician
- Bassey Dan-Abia (born 1957), Nigerian politician
- Bassey Etim, Nigerian politician
- Bassey Ewa-Henshaw (born 1943), Nigerian politician
- Bassey Eyo Ephraim Adam III (1904–1986), Nigerian nobleman and Obong of Calabar
- Bassey Ikpi (born 1976), Nigerian-American poet, writer and mental health advocate
- Bassey Otu (born 1959), Nigerian politician

== See also ==
- Count Basie (1904–1984), American musician
