= 2023 Nigerian presidential election in Cross River State =

- 25 February 2023
- Registered: 1,766,466
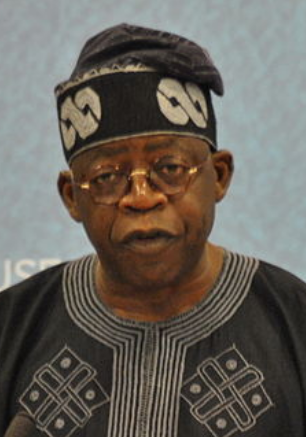

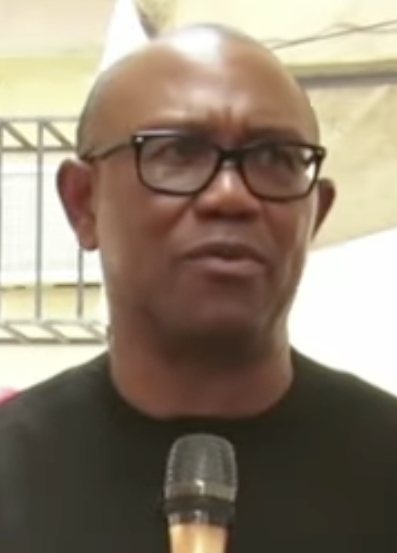

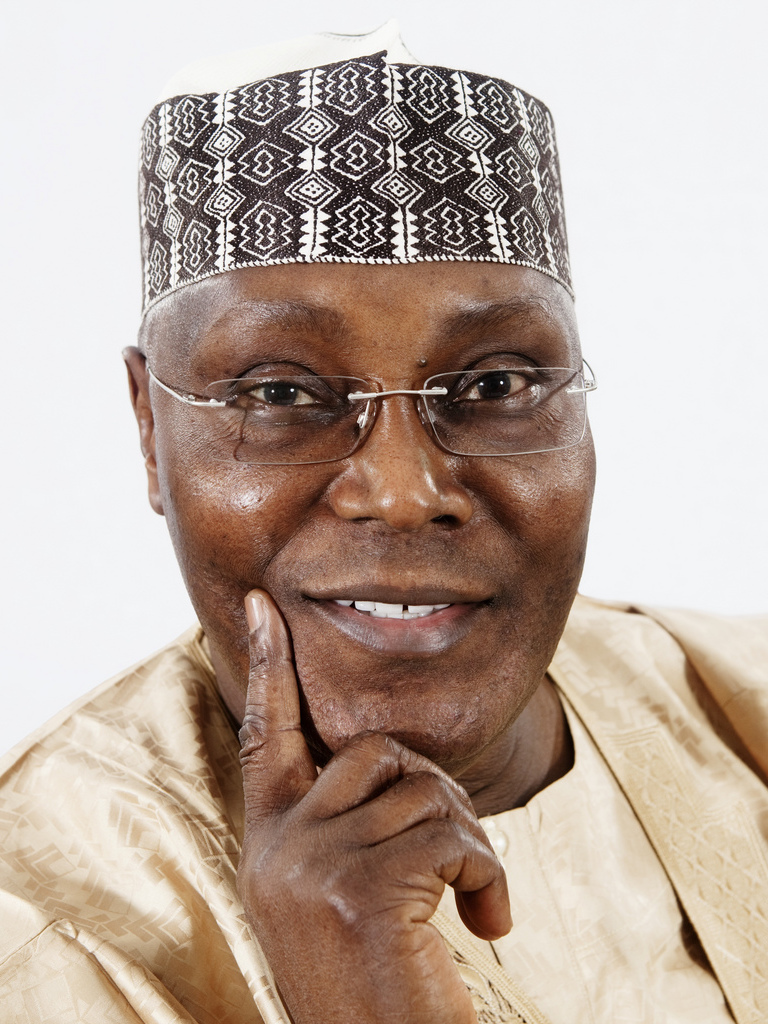
Nominee	Bola Tinubu	Peter Obi
Party	APC	LP
Home state	Lagos	Anambra
Running mate	Kashim Shettima	Yusuf Datti Baba-Ahmed
Nominee	Rabiu Kwankwaso	Atiku Abubakar
Party	New Nigeria Peoples Party	PDP
Home state	Kano	Adamawa
Running mate	Isaac Idahosa	Ifeanyi Okowa
President before election
Muhammadu Buhari
APC
Elected President
TBD

The 2023 Nigerian presidential election in Cross River State will be held on 25 February 2023 as part of the nationwide 2023 Nigerian presidential election to elect the president and vice president of Nigeria. Other federal elections, including elections to the House of Representatives and the Senate, will also be held on the same date while state elections will be held two weeks afterward on 11 March.

== Background ==
Cross River State is a diverse state in the South South with growing economy and vast natural areas but facing an underdeveloped yet vital agricultural sector, deforestation, and rising debt in large part due to years of systemic corruption. Politically, the state's 2019 elections were categorized as a continuation of the PDP's control as Ayade won with over 73% of the vote and the party won every seat in the House of Assembly along with all three senate seats. However, the PDP did lose one House of Representatives seat to the APC and although the state was easily won by PDP presidential nominee Atiku Abubakar, it still swung towards Buhari compared to 2015 and had lower turnout.

== Polling ==
Polling organisation/client	Fieldwork date	Sample size					Others	Undecided	Undisclosed	Not voting
Polling organisation/client	Fieldwork date	Sample size	Tinubu APC	Obi LP	Kwankwaso NNPP	Abubakar PDP	Others	Undecided	Undisclosed	Not voting
BantuPage	December 2022	N/A	12%	59%	0%	7%	–	7%	5%	10%
BantuPage	January 2023	N/A	7%	71%	6%	4%	–	3%	4%	4%
Nextier (Cross River crosstabs of national poll)	27 January 2023	N/A	14.7%	63.2%	–	20.6%	1.5%	–	–	–
SBM Intelligence for EiE (Cross River crosstabs of national poll)	22 January-6 February 2023	N/A	9%	74%	1%	10%	1%	4%	–	–

== Projections ==
Source	Projection		As of
Africa Elects (Note: Africa Elects projections predict the likelihood of a candidate winning a state by categorizing a state as "Safe" for exceedingly likely, "Likely" for somewhat likely, and "Lean" for least likely. If no clear determination could be made, states are categorized as "tossups".)	Likely Obi		24 February 2023
Dataphyte (Note: Dataphyte projections predict candidates' projected votal shares in each state.)
Dataphyte	Tinubu:	46.74%	11 February 2023
Dataphyte	Obi:	38.97%	11 February 2023
Dataphyte	Abubakar:	7.62%	11 February 2023
Dataphyte	Others:	6.68%	11 February 2023
Enough is Enough- SBM Intelligence (Note: EiE-SBM projections predict which candidates will win states.)	Obi		17 February 2023
SBM Intelligence (Note: SBM projections predict which candidates will win states or, if no determination could be made, categorizes states as "Too close to call" (TCC).)	Obi		15 December 2022
ThisDay (Note: ThisDay projections predict candidates' projected votal shares in each state.)
ThisDay	Tinubu:	25%	27 December 2022
ThisDay	Obi:	35%	27 December 2022
ThisDay	Kwankwaso:	–	27 December 2022
ThisDay	Abubakar:	20%	27 December 2022
ThisDay	Others/Undecided:	20%	27 December 2022
The Nation (Note: SBM projections predict which candidates will win states or, if no determination could be made, categorizes states as "Battlegrounds.")	Battleground		12-19 February 2023

== General election ==
=== Results ===
2023 Nigerian presidential election in Cross River State
Party	Candidate	Votes	%
A	Christopher Imumolen		
AA	Hamza al-Mustapha		
ADP	Yabagi Sani		
APP	Osita Nnadi		
AAC	Omoyele Sowore		
ADC	Dumebi Kachikwu		
APC	Bola Tinubu		
APGA	Peter Umeadi		
APM	Princess Chichi Ojei		
BP	Sunday Adenuga		
LP	Peter Obi		
NRM	Felix Johnson Osakwe		
New Nigeria Peoples Party	Rabiu Kwankwaso		
PRP	Kola Abiola		
PDP	Atiku Abubakar		
SDP	Adewole Adebayo		
YPP	Malik Ado-Ibrahim		
ZLP	Dan Nwanyanwu		
Total votes			100.00%
Invalid or blank votes			N/A
Turnout			

==== By senatorial district ====
The results of the election by senatorial district.

Senatorial district	Bola Tinubu APC		Atiku Abubakar PDP		Peter Obi LP		Rabiu Kwankwaso NNPP		Others		Total valid votes
Senatorial district	Votes	%	Votes	%	Votes	%	Votes	%	Votes	%	Total valid votes
Cross River Central Senatorial District (Note: Comprising the local government areas of Abi, Boki, Etung, Ikom, Obubra, and Yakurr.)	TBD	%	TBD	%	TBD	%	TBD	%	TBD	%	TBD
Cross River North Senatorial District (Note: Comprising the local government areas of Bekwarra, Biase, Obanliku, Obudu, Ogoja, and Yala.)	TBD	%	TBD	%	TBD	%	TBD	%	TBD	%	TBD
Cross River South Senatorial District (Note: Comprising the local government areas of Akamkpa, Akpabuyo, Bakassi, Calabar Municipal, Calabar South, and Odukpani.)	TBD	%	TBD	%	TBD	%	TBD	%	TBD	%	TBD
Totals	TBD	%	TBD	%	TBD	%	TBD	%	TBD	%	TBD

==== By federal constituency ====
The results of the election by federal constituency.

Federal constituency	Bola Tinubu APC		Atiku Abubakar PDP		Peter Obi LP		Rabiu Kwankwaso NNPP		Others		Total valid votes
Federal constituency	Votes	%	Votes	%	Votes	%	Votes	%	Votes	%	Total valid votes
Abi/Yakurr Federal Constituency (Note: Comprising the local government areas of Abi and Yakurr.)	TBD	%	TBD	%	TBD	%	TBD	%	TBD	%	TBD
Akamkpa/Biase Federal Constituency (Note: Comprising the local government areas of Akamkpa and Biase.)	TBD	%	TBD	%	TBD	%	TBD	%	TBD	%	TBD
Akpabuyo/Bakassi/Calabar South Federal Constituency (Note: Comprising the local government areas of Akpabuyo, Bakassi, and Calabar South.)	TBD	%	TBD	%	TBD	%	TBD	%	TBD	%	TBD
Calabar Municipal/Odukpani Federal Constituency (Note: Comprising the local government areas of Calabar Municipal and Odukpani.)	TBD	%	TBD	%	TBD	%	TBD	%	TBD	%	TBD
Ikom/Boki Federal Constituency (Note: Comprising the local government areas of Boki and Ikom.)	TBD	%	TBD	%	TBD	%	TBD	%	TBD	%	TBD
Obanliku/Obudu/Bekwarra Federal Constituency (Note: Comprising the local government areas of Bekwarra, Obanliku, and Obudu.)	TBD	%	TBD	%	TBD	%	TBD	%	TBD	%	TBD
Obubra/Etung Federal Constituency (Note: Comprising the local government areas of Etung and Obubra.)	TBD	%	TBD	%	TBD	%	TBD	%	TBD	%	TBD
Ogoja/Yala Federal Constituency (Note: Comprising the local government areas of Ogoja and Yala.)	TBD	%	TBD	%	TBD	%	TBD	%	TBD	%	TBD
Totals	TBD	%	TBD	%	TBD	%	TBD	%	TBD	%	TBD

==== By local government area ====
The results of the election by local government area.

Local government area	Bola Tinubu APC		Atiku Abubakar PDP		Peter Obi LP		Rabiu Kwankwaso NNPP		Others		Total valid votes	Turnout (%)
Local government area	Votes	%	Votes	%	Votes	%	Votes	%	Votes	%	Total valid votes	Turnout (%)
Abi	TBD	%	TBD	%	TBD	%	TBD	%	TBD	%	TBD	%
Akamkpa	TBD	%	TBD	%	TBD	%	TBD	%	TBD	%	TBD	%
Akpabuyo	TBD	%	TBD	%	TBD	%	TBD	%	TBD	%	TBD	%
Bekwarra	TBD	%	TBD	%	TBD	%	TBD	%	TBD	%	TBD	%
Biase	TBD	%	TBD	%	TBD	%	TBD	%	TBD	%	TBD	%
Boki	TBD	%	TBD	%	TBD	%	TBD	%	TBD	%	TBD	%
Calabar Municipal	TBD	%	TBD	%	TBD	%	TBD	%	TBD	%	TBD	%
Calabar South	TBD	%	TBD	%	TBD	%	TBD	%	TBD	%	TBD	%
Etung	TBD	%	TBD	%	TBD	%	TBD	%	TBD	%	TBD	%
Ikom	TBD	%	TBD	%	TBD	%	TBD	%	TBD	%	TBD	%
Obanliku	TBD	%	TBD	%	TBD	%	TBD	%	TBD	%	TBD	%
Obubra	TBD	%	TBD	%	TBD	%	TBD	%	TBD	%	TBD	%
Obudu	TBD	%	TBD	%	TBD	%	TBD	%	TBD	%	TBD	%
Odukpani	TBD	%	TBD	%	TBD	%	TBD	%	TBD	%	TBD	%
Ogoja	TBD	%	TBD	%	TBD	%	TBD	%	TBD	%	TBD	%
Yakurr	TBD	%	TBD	%	TBD	%	TBD	%	TBD	%	TBD	%
Yala	TBD	%	TBD	%	TBD	%	TBD	%	TBD	%	TBD	%
Totals	TBD	%	TBD	%	TBD	%	TBD	%	TBD	%	TBD	%

== See also ==
- 2023 Cross River State elections
- 2023 Nigerian presidential election
