= 2003 Nigerian Senate elections in Cross River State =

2003 Nigerian Senate election in Cross River State

The 2003 Nigerian Senate election in Cross River State was held on April 12, 2003, to elect members of the Nigerian Senate to represent Cross River State. Gregory Ngaji representing Cross River North, Victor Ndoma-Egba representing Cross River Central and Bassey Ewa-Henshaw representing Cross River South all won on the platform of the Peoples Democratic Party.

== Overview ==
Affiliation	Party		Total
Affiliation	PDP	AD	Total
Before Election			3
After Election	3	0	3

== Summary ==
District	Incumbent	Party	Elected Senator	Party
Cross River North			Gregory Ngaji	PDP
Cross River Central			Victor Ndoma-Egba	PDP
Cross River South			Bassey Ewa-Henshaw	PDP

== Results ==
=== Cross River North ===
The election was won by Gregory Ngaji of the Peoples Democratic Party.

2003 Nigerian Senate election in Cross River State
Party	Candidate	Votes	%
PDP	Gregory Ngaji		
Total votes			
PDP hold			

=== Cross River Central ===
The election was won by Victor Ndoma-Egba of the Peoples Democratic Party.

2003 Nigerian Senate election in Cross River State
Party	Candidate	Votes	%
PDP	Victor Ndoma-Egba		
Total votes			
PDP hold			

=== Cross River South ===
The election was won by Bassey Ewa-Henshaw of the Peoples Democratic Party.

2003 Nigerian Senate election in Cross River State
Party	Candidate	Votes	%
PDP	Bassey Ewa-Henshaw		
Total votes			
PDP hold			
