= 2007 Nigerian Senate elections in Cross River State =

The 2007 Nigerian Senate election in Cross River State was held on 21 April 2007, to elect members of the Nigerian Senate to represent Cross River State. Victor Ndoma-Egba representing Cross River Central, Bassey Ewa-Henshaw representing Cross River South and Gregory Ngaji representing Cross River North all won on the platform of the People's Democratic Party.

== Overview ==
Affiliation	Party		Total
Affiliation	AC	PDP	Total
Before Election			3
After Election	0	3	3

== Summary ==
District	Incumbent	Party	Elected Senator	Party
Taraba Central			Victor Ndoma-Egba	PDP
Cross River South			Bassey Ewa-Henshaw	PDP
Cross River North			Gregory Ngaji	PDP

== Results ==
=== Cross River Central ===
The election was won by Victor Ndoma-Egba of the Peoples Democratic Party (Nigeria).

2007 Nigerian Senate election in Cross River State
Party	Candidate	Votes	%
PDP	Victor Ndoma-Egba		
Total votes			
PDP hold			

=== Cross River South ===
The election was won by Bassey Ewa-Henshaw of the Peoples Democratic Party (Nigeria).

2007 Nigerian Senate election in Cross River State
Party	Candidate	Votes	%
PDP	Bassey Ewa-Henshaw		
Total votes			
PDP hold			

=== Cross River North ===
The election was won by Gregory Ngaji of the Peoples Democratic Party (Nigeria).

2007 Nigerian Senate election in Cross River State
Party	Candidate	Votes	%
PDP	Gregory Ngaji		
Total votes			
PDP hold			
