= Bassey Akiba =

Nigerian politician

Member House of Representatives
- Incumbent
- Assumed office June 13, 2023
- Preceded by: Etta Mbora
- Constituency: Calabar Municipal/Odukpani

Personal details
- Born: Bassey Akiba; 12 December 1969 (age 56) Akpap Okoyong, Odukpani, Cross River State
- Party: APC
- Spouse: AsI Bassey
- Children: 4
- Education: University of Calabar
- Occupation: Politician

Bassey Akiba (born December 12, 1969) is a Nigerian politician and current member representing Calabar Municipal/Odukpani federal constituency at the House of Representatives. He was a two-term chairman of Odukpani Local government council from 2004 to 2010 and a member of the Cross River State House of Assembly from 2015 to 2019.

== Background, family and education ==
Akiba was born in Akpap Okoyong, Odukpani local government area, Cross River State. He is married to AsI Bassey and they have 4 children together.

Akiba did his primary education at Bishop King Memorial Primary School in Calabar, Cross River State, where he obtained his First School Leaving Certificate in 1982. He proceeded to Government Secondary School in Creek Town, Odukpani L.G.A, where he obtained his Senior Secondary School Certificate in 1989. Furthering his education, he attended Ibrahim Babangida College of Agriculture in Ovonum, Obubra, Cross River State, where he obtained a National Diploma in Forestry Management in 1992. He later proceeded to the University of Calabar, where he obtained Bachelor of Science Degree in Mathematics/Statistics in 1999.

== Career ==
Akiba started off his political career as a Personal Assistant to the Commissioner for Agriculture and Works in 1999.

He later emerged Chairman of Odukpani Local Government Council in 2004 and served for two terms until 2010. His tenure was said to have offered effective service delivery, enthroment of peace, security and infrastructural development.

From 2015 to 2019, Akiba served as a Member of the Cross River State House of Assembly, representing Odukpani State Constituency.

=== House of representatives ===
Akiba contested in the 2023 Nigerian House of Representatives election under Labour Party and emerged Member representing Calabar Municipality/Odukpani Federal Constituency at the House of Representatives defeating the incumbent Etta Mbora of the PDP and Edim Inok of the APC.

In the Federal House of Representatives, Akiba currently serves the Deputy Chairman of the Health Care Services Committee and membership in other key committees, such as Public Accounts, FERMA, National Security and Intelligence, and Environment. In 2024 he introduced The Bridge Cooperative, a scheme designed to ensure structured community-driven development. Each cooperative within the wards of Calabar Municipality and Odukpani is led by an elected president, according to him, this approach is to empower local communities and foster a sense of responsibility and accountability.

==== Bills sponsored ====
Akiba has so far sponsored 3 bills;

1. Bill to establish the Chartered Institute of Econometricians Data Analyst.
2. Bill to establish the National Institute of Vocational and Technical Education in Okurikang Okoyong, Odukpani, Cross River State.
3. Bill for an Act to Establish the Institute of Health Service Administrators of Nigeria
