= Bassey Ewa =

Nigerian politician

Bassey Eko Ewa

Member of the House of Representatives of Nigeria
- In office 2003–2019
- Constituency: Yakurr/Abi Federal Constituency

Personal details
- Party: Peoples Democratic Party
- Occupation: Politician

Bassey Eko Ewa is a Nigerian politician, who served as a member of the House of Representatives, representing the Yakurr/Abi Federal Constituency of Cross Rivers State on the platform of the Peoples Democratic Party (PDP).

== Early life and education ==
Ewa was born on 28 May 1967 in Ntan in Ekori, Yakurr Local Government Area of Cross River State, Nigeria. He attended Ikori Primary School, Comprehensive Secondary School, and the College of Basic Studies. He later studied law at the University of Calabar and attended the Nigerian Law School.

== Political career ==
Ewa was a four-time member of the House of Representatives, representing the Yakurr/Abi Federal Constituency of Cross Rivers State, and was succeeded by Alex Egbona.

Ewa served as a Majority Leader and later as a former Speaker of the Cross River State House of Assembly. He has served in various roles within the Peoples Democratic Party (PDP), in 2025, he was appointed Chairman of the Cross River State Peoples Democratic Party Caretaker Committee by the PDP National Working Committee to manage party affairs following the expiration of the tenure of the state executive committee.

In 2025, Ewa joined a coalition of reform-oriented lawmakers and former representatives under the group House to the Rescue, urging the Independent National Electoral Commission to adopt electronic transmission of election results to enhance transparency and integrity in future elections.

== Electoral challenges and senatorial ambition ==
In the period leading up to the 2015 general elections, Ewa faced opposition from sections of the Yakurr community, including elders and political stakeholders, who publicly expressed reservations about his return to the House of Representatives. He won the election with a total of 88 votes out of 89 votes.

Following this development, Ewa expressed interest in contesting a senatorial seat in 2023. He lost the senatorial seat to Eteng Jonah Williams, an All Progressive Congress (APC) candidate.

== Community development ==
Ewa undertook several community development initiatives across his constituency. He facilitated the inclusion of Ugep in the Urban Renewal Programme, leading to improvements in road infrastructure, and supported the promotion of the Leboku cultural festival to enhance cultural tourism and government engagement.

He provided educational support through scholarships for students across multiple wards. He also supported the construction and rehabilitation of classroom blocks and facilitated the establishment of an ICT centre in Ekori. He sponsored annual medical outreach programmes that provided free medical care and also made provision of solar-powered boreholes. Ewa also implemented empowerment programmes that included skills acquisition training and the distribution of business support items such as tricycles, motorcycles, grinding machines, and cash grants to beneficiaries.

== See also ==
- Peoples Democratic Party (Nigeria)
- Cross River State House of Assembly
- List of members of the House of Representatives of Nigeria, 2007–2011
- List of members of the House of Representatives of Nigeria, 2015–2019
