= Okuku =

Okuku may refer to:

- Okuku, Cross River State, a town in Nigeria
- Okuku, Osun State, a town in Nigeria
- Okuku, New Zealand, a town in the Waimakariri District, New Zealand
