= Elvert Ayambem =

Nigerian politician (born 1979)

Elvert Ayambem Ekom
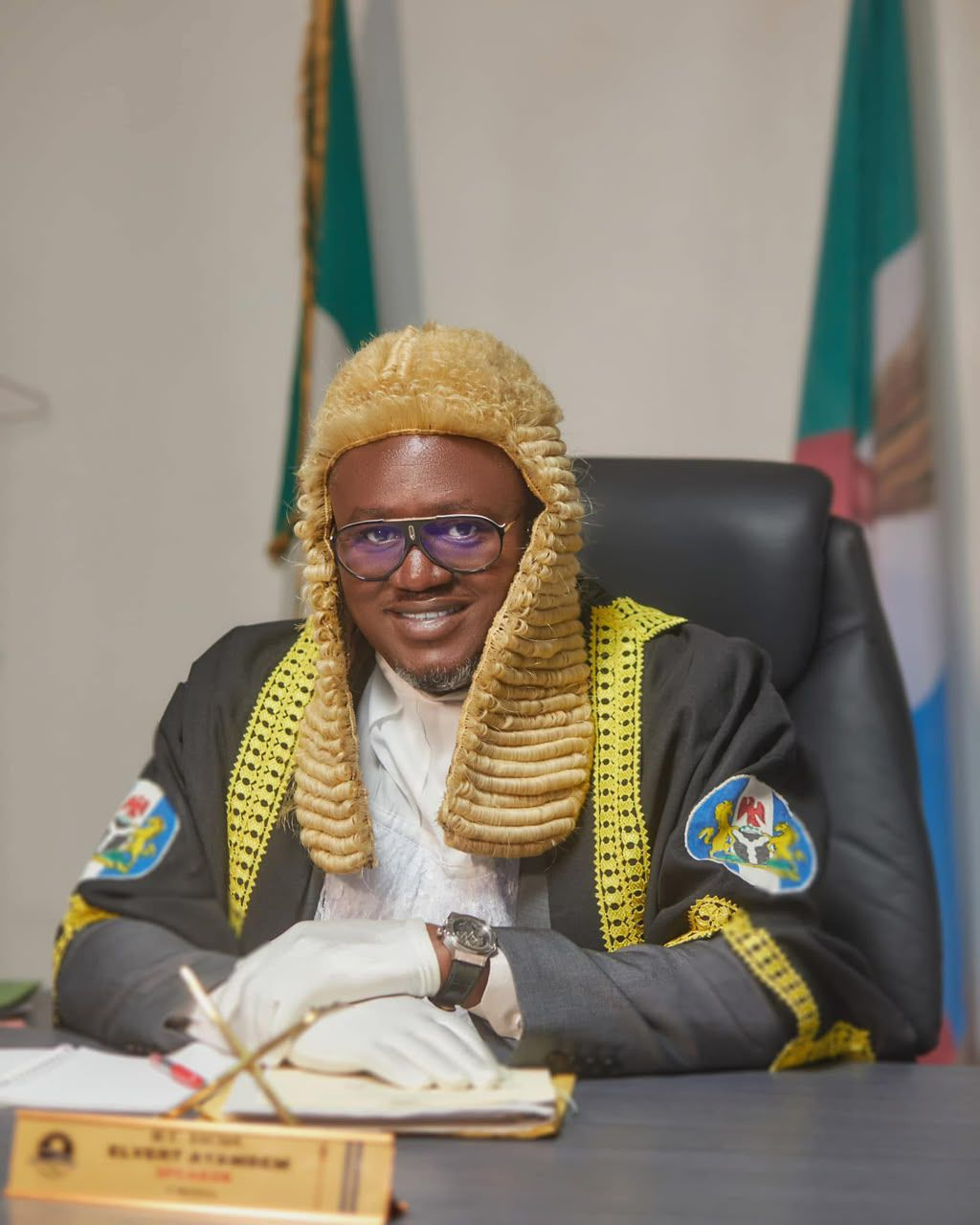

Speaker Cross River State House of Assembly
- In office June 2023 – 2027
- Preceded by: Eteng William

Personal details
- Born: 22 July 1979 (age 47) Nde, Ikom, Cross River State, Nigeria
- Party: All Progressives Congress (2021–present)
- Education: University of Calabar
- Occupation: Politician

Elvert Ayambem Ekom (born 22 July 1979) is a Nigerian politician currently serving as speaker of the 10th Cross River State House of Assembly since June 2023.

== Early life and education ==
Elvert Ayambem was born at Nde, Ikom, Cross River State, Nigeria. He attended Nde Community Primary School. For his secondary education he attended the Nde Community Secondary School in Ikom, and later graduated with a BSc in Sociology from University of Calabar.

== Politics ==
Elvert joined politics and became a member of the All Progressives Congress (APC). Thereafter, he was elected member of the Cross River State House of Assembly representing Ikom 2 State Constituency.

=== Speaker ===
Ayambem was nominated for the speakership position by Kingsley Ntui representing Etung Constituency and the motion was seconded by Eyo Okon Edet representing Bakassi Constituency. Ayambem was elected speaker unchallenged on 13 June 2023 following the proclamation of the governor of the state for the inauguration of the 10th state assembly. He succeeded Eteng William who was speaker of the 9th assembly and was elected to the 10th Nigerian Senate.

== Impeachment ==
Elvert was impeached in May 2023 by 17 members out of the 25-member House over allegations of misappropriation of funds. Majority of the lawmakers passed a no-confidence vote on the Rt. Hon. Ayambem, after about 11 months in office.

After an intervention by the Governor Bassey Otu, Ayambem was reinstated later in May 2023.
