= Gabu, Nigeria =

Settlement in Cross River State, Nigeria

Gabu is a town in Nigeria, Africa, with Igede as the official language.

Gabu is situated in the Yala Local Government Area of Cross River State, Nigeria. Its geographical coordinates are 6° 51' 0" North, 8° 46' 0" East. It is bounded to the north by Benue State, to the south by Ijegu – Yala, to the east by Aliforkpa, and to the west by the Igede-speaking part of Benue State. The only language spoken by the Gabu people is Igede, though English and Pidgin English are occasionally spoken for official purposes. Gabu possesses good climatic soil and vegetation conditions that provide agricultural and agro-allied industrial potentials. A large part of the Gabu region consists of grassland or savanna and rainforest in places such as Ega, Ajumole and Adikpe. This variety of soils and vegetation makes possible the cultivation of a wide variety of agricultural produce, ranging from food to cash crops. The food crops grown include yams, cassava, cocoyam, maize, beans, rice, millet, and other market and garden crops. Some of the cash crops that thrive well in the region also include palm-oil, bananas and plantains.

The community is dependent seasonally on a major river called Okpogwu River and its tributaries. This river is a fishing ground for the community, and the banks of the river provide good soil for agricultural activities because of the alluvial deposits from the river currents. Other rivers that flow through Gabu include Ogrokpo and Orba.

The community's abundant salt deposits actively sustain small to medium scale salt industries in the area. The salt deposits represent a deep history to the people of Gabu and are mined locally. The community also offers a wide range of investment opportunities in agriculture-based industries as well as solid mineral industries. Other mineral resources found in Gabu in economic deposits include barite, quartzite, clay, gravel, and sharp sand. Barite is currently being mined by different companies in Gabu. Efforts are also ongoing by the community to prospect for hydrocarbon, limestone, coal and other mineral resources. These resources are suspected to be in great abundance in Gabu owing to the depositional nature of Gabu terrain.

The community has a number of social amenities and infrastructures such as a health center, customary court, primary and secondary schools, roads and telecommunications services for effective communication. There are traditional institutions (Chiefs) which govern and administer justice to the people of Gabu at the local level.

The community can be accessed through Okuku – Ijegu Road, Aliforkpa – Gabu Road, and through Konshisha Road from Benue State.
