= Gabu =

Gabu or Gabú may refer to:

- Gabú region of Guinea-Bissau
  - Gabú, a town and capital of Gabú region, Guinea-Bissau
  - Kaabu, the namesake historical state
- Gabu, Nigeria
- Gat Andrés Bonifacio University, a university in the Philippines
