= Kathleen Okafor =

Nigerian professor and VC of Baze University

Kathleen Ebelechukwu Okafor

Vice chancellor of Baze University
- Incumbent
- Assumed office 2023
- Preceded by: Tahir Mamman

Personal details
- Born: Nnewi, Anambra State

Kathleen Ebelechukwu Okafor is a Nigerian professor of property and commercial law and the acting Vice Chancellor of Baze University.

== Early life and background ==
Kathleen obtained Her O'Level exams at Queens School Enugu and got her LL.B degree from the University of Nigeria, Nsukka in 1974. She then proceeded to the Nigerian Law School Lagos campus and was called to bar in 1979. She was elevated to the rank of Senior Advocate of Nigeria in September 2022 by the Nigerian Bar.

She got her LL.M degree from the University College London in 1981 and her PhD from the University of Lagos in 2000.

== Career ==
Kathleen Okafor practised briefly in the Lateef Adegbite & Co Chambers. She was also a second counsel with Shell Petroleum from there proceeded to work as Legal Adviser and Company Secretary for the Nigerian Security Printing and Minting Plc.

As part of her leadership duties, she was the Dean, Faculty of Law Baze University and Chairperson Faculty of Law welfare committee.

She was appointed by the governing council of Baze University as the Acting Vice Chancellor in August 2023 following the appointment of the former Vice Chancellor, Prof. Tahir Mamman as Education Minister by the president Bola Ahmed Tinubu government.
