= Agom Jarigbe =

Nigerian politician

Jarigbe Agom Jarigbe
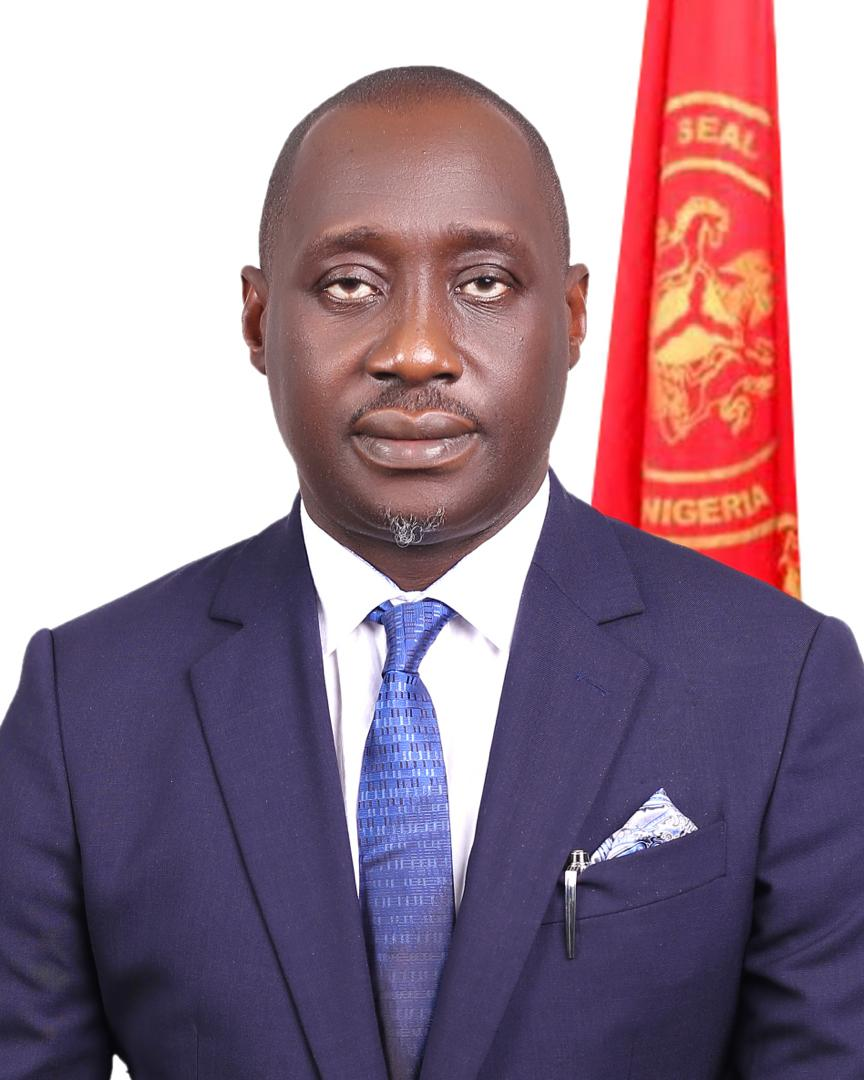

Member of the Senate of Nigeria
- Incumbent
- Assumed office September 15, 2021
- Preceded by: Rose Okoji Oko
- Constituency: Cross River North

Personal details
- Born: Jarigbe Agom Jarigbe; December 9, 1970 (age 55) Ogoja, Cross River State, Nigeria
- Party: All Progressives Congress (since 2025)
- Other political affiliations: Peoples Democratic Party (until 2025)
- Spouse: Offiong Jarigbe
- Children: 4
- Education: University of Calabar, Baze University
- Occupation: Politician
- Website: www.senatorjarigbe.com

Jarigbe Agom Jarigbe (born December 9, 1970) is a Nigerian politician serving as Senator representing Cross River North Senatorial District (Upper Cross River or Uppercross). He previously served in the House of Representatives representing the Ogoja/Yala Federal Constituency.

== Political career ==
Jarigbe was elected to the House of Representatives in 2015 under the Peoples Democratic Party (PDP) and served two terms.

In 2020, he won the Cross River North Senatorial by-election. The result was initially disputed, but in July 2021, the Supreme Court of Nigeria declared him the duly elected senator. He was sworn in on September 15, 2021.

He was reelected in the 2023 general elections under the PDP.

In October 2025, Jarigbe defected from the PDP to the All Progressives Congress (APC).

== Recent activities and initiatives ==
In 2025, Jarigbe facilitated several constituency development projects across Cross River North, including the installation of solar-powered boreholes and water supply schemes in rural communities.

He also initiated educational support programmes, including bursary awards to students across multiple tertiary institutions in the district.

In 2026, he signaled interest in seeking reelection ahead of the next electoral cycle.

== Personal life ==
Jarigbe is married to Offiong Jarigbe and has four children.

== Early life ==
Jarigbe comes from Ibil in the Ogoja Local Government Area of Cross River State. He attended the School of Basic studies in PortHarcourt, Rivers State, where he passed the West African Senior Secondary Certificate Examination (WASSCE) in 1990. He obtained a bachelor's degree in chemistry from the University of Calabar, Cross River State in 2004. Jarigbe earned a bachelor's degree in law from Baze University in November 2022.

== Awards and recognitions ==
In 2024, Senator Jarigbe was awarded the Cross River Most Outstanding Senator of the Year by Yala Achievers Summit & Award. This award was presented at the National Assembly Complex, Abuja. Previously, he received the ICON of Humanitarian Service Award (2019), Legislator of the Year (2020) by the African Custodian, ICON of Nation Building Award (2021), and the Global Peace and Humanitarian Award (2022) by the United Nations.
