= Asuquo Ekpenyong =

Nigerian politician (born 1985)

Commissioner for Finance Cross River State
- In office November 2015 – March 2022

Commissioner for transport and Marine services Cross River State
- In office October 2018 – May 2019

Senator of the Federal Republic of Nigeria representing Cross River south senatorial district
- Incumbent
- Assumed office June 2023
- Preceded by: Gershom Bassey

Personal details
- Born: 25 August 1985 (age 41) Eniong Abatim, Odukpani Cross River State, Nigeria
- Party: All Progressives Congress (2021–present)
- Spouse: Netanela Duke Ekpenyong
- Education: University of Reading
- Occupation: Politician
- Profession: Investment Banker, Financial Analyst

Asuquo Ekpenyong (born 25 August 1985) is a Nigerian politician and financial analyst. He is the former Cross River State Commissioner for Finance and is currently the senator representing Cross River south senatorial district or Lower Cross River (Lowercross) and the youngest Senator in the Nigerian Senate.

== Background and education ==
Asuquo Ekpenyong Jr was born into the family of Chief Dr. Asuquo Ekpenyong and Dr. Mrs. Iquo Ekpenyong. He did his secondary education at King's College Lagos and further obtained a degree in Economics from the University of Reading in 2007 and a master's degree in International Banking and Financial Services in 2008.

== Career ==
Asuquo Ekpenyong worked as a financial analyst in Lagos and then moved to Cross River where he worked for two years as a lecturer in the Banking and Finance Department of the University of Calabar. He established Iquasu Ventures Limited, a haulage and logistics company, in 2010 and later took over as Managing Director of the Central Bank of Nigeria (CBN) licensed Chamley Bureau de Change Limited. Asuquo was later appointed Executive Director for Finance at Pearland Energy, an indigenous Oil and Gas company, and a member of the board of directors at Ekondo Microfinance Bank Limited.

In December 2015 Asuquo was appointed Cross River State Commissioner for finance by Governor Benedict Ayade at the age of 29, making him the youngest commissioner in Nigeria. He is the longest serving commissioner for Finance in Cross River State.

In 2018 Asuquo was appointed commissioner for transport and marine services following the resignation of Mr. Savior Nyong to contest the 2019 elections.

Asuquo resigned as Commissioner for finance and Joined the race for governorship of Cross River State in the 2023 Cross River State gubernatorial election and was a leading aspirant until the emergence of Senator Bassey Otu as the consensus candidate of the All progressive congress (APC) in the state.

In May 2022, Asuquo Ekpenyong emerged winner of the All Progressives Congress (APC) senatorial primaries with 347 votes out of 351 accredited voters. He subsequently went on to win the Federal Senatorial seat representing Cross River South Senatorial District in the 10th Nigerian Senate in February 2023. He was named the chairman, Senate committee on NDDC of the 10th senate on 8 August 2023.

== Personal life ==
Asuquo Ekpenyong married Netanela Duke Ekpenyong, the second daughter of former governor Donald Duke in 2018, and they have two children together.
