= Okpoma =

Okpoma is the headquarters of Yala Local Government Area of Cross River State, Nigeria. It has many communities including Olachor, Oba, Abachor, Itega Okpame, Okpudu, Itega Okpudu, Idiku, Ijama, Adeni, Iboko and many more.

It has many salt ponds which are of historical importance to the Yala people. The Yalas are said to have settled in the land because of the discovery of high content of salt in the underground water of the land. The underground water holds enough salt content to support small scale salt industry. Salt is mined locally. Rice is also produced in commercial quantity from Adeni and Ijama bordering Ishiaya of Ogoja Local Government Area.

== See also ==
- Yala language
- Cross River State
- The Yalas of Yala Local Government Area of Nigeria
