= Cross River South senatorial district =

Senatorial district in Cross River State, Nigeria

Cross River South senatorial district (Lower Cross River or Lower Cross) is in Cross River State, Nigeria. It covers the following seven local government areas of the state: Calabar Municipality, Calabar South, Akpabuyo, Bakassi, Odukpani, Biase and Akampka. Asuquo Ekpenyong of the All Progressives Congress (APC) is the current senator representing the Cross River South senatorial district at the Nigerian senate. On 24 May 2020, the Nigerian Navy arrested 42 suspected cultists during initiation at Akpabuyo LGA in Cross River South senatorial district.

The Southern Senatorial District of Cross River State, Nigeria, generally lies between latitudes 4°15'N and 5°32'N and longitudes 7°50'E and 9°28'E. The population of Southern Senatorial District is estimated at around 1.6 million inhabitants.

In early 2020, some persons from the Cross Rivers South senatorial district, under the aegis of Cross River South Stakeholders Group and headed by High Chief Ita Ewa Henshaw, tried to recall the Senator representing the district by writing a petition of recall to the Independent National Electoral Commission (INEC). The petition generated a lot of controversies but failed in its intended purpose.

== List of senators representing Cross River South ==
Senator	Party	Year	Assembly
Joseph Oqua Ansa	NPN	1979-1983	2nd republic
Patrick Ani	SDP	1993	3rd
Florence Ita-Giwa	ANPP	1999-2003	4th
Bassey Ewa Henshaw	PDP	2003-2011	5th-6th
Bassey Otu	PDP	2011-2015	7th
Gershom Henry Bassey	PDP	2015-2023	8th-9th
Asuquo Ekpenyong	APC	2023-till date	10th

== See also ==
- Cross River State
