= Alifokpa =

Community in Yache Ward in Cross River State, Nigeria

Coordinates: 6.842°N 8.802°E

Alifokpa or Aliforkpa is a community in Yache Ward in Yala Local Government Area of Cross River State, Nigeria. The language spoken by the people is Ekpari (Akpa). The natives are predominantly farmers who specialize in growing Yam, Cassava, Rice, Pepper, Garden Egg and Groundnut production. The community is made up of three clans, namely: Echuji, Enduchui and Aji.

It observes a five days a week calendar. These are: Ogereje, Odama, Ogbada, Akpakpa and the last being Ogidi is the market day. The community is closely knit together by cultural antiquities such as the traditional dances (Igana, Otsichui, Ayeta and Akataka). The New Yam festival is annually observed on 25 August, whereby the yearly bumper harvest is celebrated.

== Geography ==
Alifokpa is located in the north east of the region Yala. Other places in the area include:

- Acraha
- Alhokpa
- Chakpu
- Eja
- Gabu
- Ije
- Ipule -Endichui
- Mbor
- Mbur
- Oshina
- Uchu
