= Joseph Oqua Ansa =

Nigerian politician (1940–2019)

Senator of the Federal Republic of Nigeria from Cross River South Senatorial District
- In office 1979–1983
- Succeeded by: Senator Patrick Ani

Personal details
- Born: 20 August 1940 (age 86) Nkonib (Ikot Ansa)
- Party: National Party of Nigeria
- Education: Hope Waddell Training Institution
- Awards: Member of the order of the Niger (MON)

Joseph Oqua Ansa was a Senator of the Federal Republic of Nigeria. He was elected two terms in 1979 and 1983 to represent Cross River South Senatorial District during the Nigerian Second Republic (1979–1983). He was a member of the National Party of Nigeria (NPN)

== Career ==
Senator Ansa was the chairman of Senate Committee on Labour and Productivity, he moved the motion which led to May Day being declared a public holiday and observed as workers day in Nigeria. It is also on record that he moved the "Senator for life" motion.

== Personal life and death ==
Joseph Oqua Ansa was married, he was a devoted Christian a labour unionist, writer and a politician, he died on 26 November 2019 after a brief illness, he is a father of 10 children, 14 grandchildren.

On 11 March 2020, the Nigerian Senate observed minute's silence in his memory.
