= Gregory Ngaji =

Nigerian politician

Gregory Ikaba Ngaji

National Senator
- In office May 2003 – May 2011
- Preceded by: Pius Musa Adede
- Succeeded by: Benedict Ayade
- Constituency: Cross River North

Personal details
- Born: 17 November 1946 (age 79)
- Party: People's Democratic Party (PDP)
- Profession: Lawyer, Politician

Gregory Ngaji is a Nigerian politician who served as a member of the national senate for the Cross River North constituency of Cross River State between 2003 and 2011.

== Background ==
Gregory Ngaji was born on 17 November 1946. He attended Mary Knoll College, Okuku, Yala, Cross Rivers State, 1961–1965, obtained an LL.B, from the University of Nigeria, Nsukka, in 1977, and obtained a BL from the Nigerian Law School in 1978. Before being elected to the Senate, he was Chairman of the Yala Local Government Area, and he served as a member of the Constitutional Conference (1994–1995).

== Senate career ==
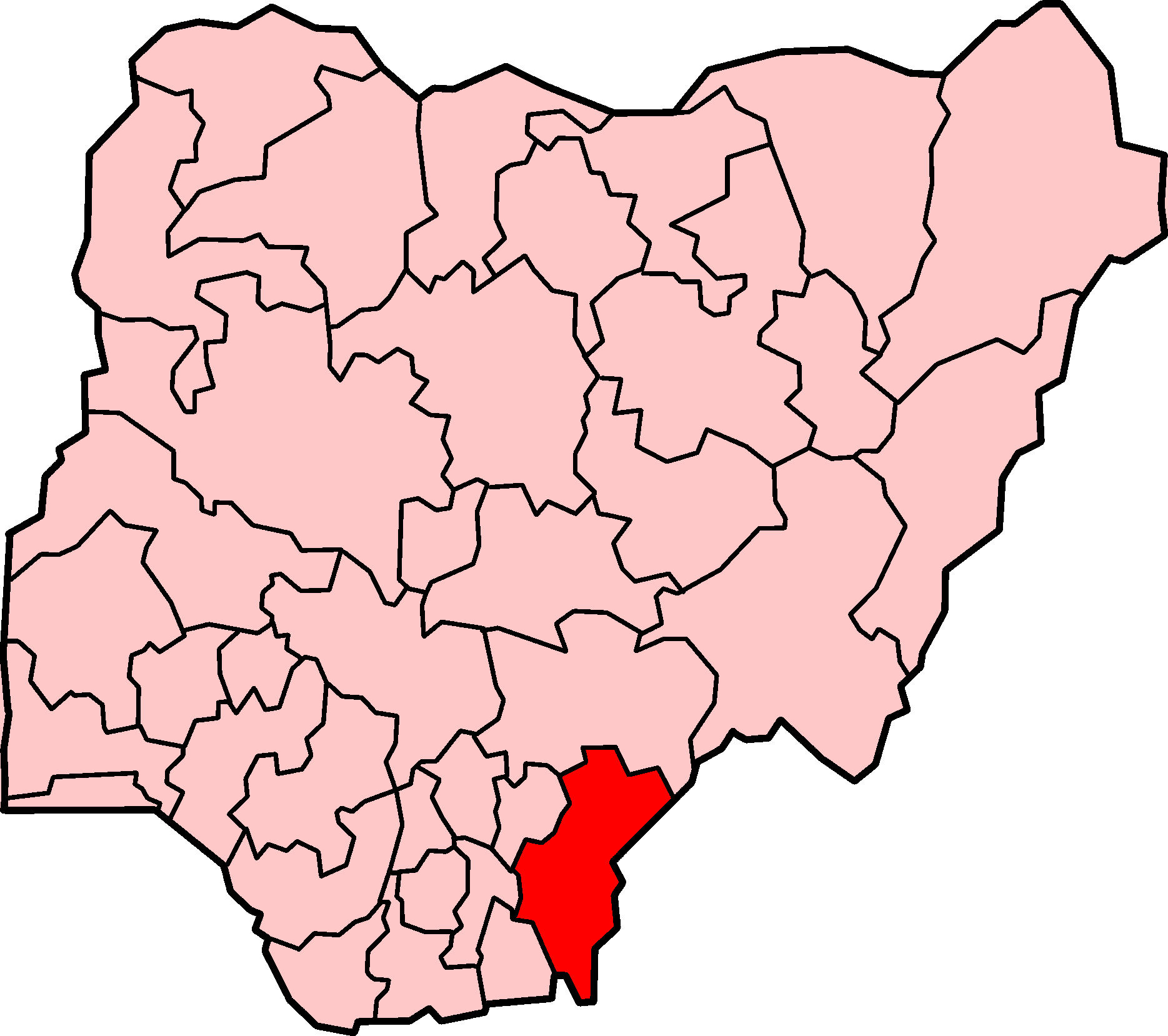
Cross River State in Nigeria

Running as a People's Democratic Party (PDP) candidate, Gregory Ngaji was elected as senator in the 5th (2003–2007) National Assembly representing Cross River North Senatorial District, and was reelected in April 2007. He serves on committees on Water Resources, Science & Technology, Marine Transport, Drugs Narcotics Anti Corruption and Agriculture

He was a member of the senate panel who screened Mrs Farida Waziri in June 2008 for the position as chairman of the Economic and Financial Crimes Commission (EFCC). In April 2009, he was one of the sponsors of a bill for establishment of Nigerian Transport Commission to replace the Nigeria Shippers Council. In a mid-term assessment of Nigerian Senators published by This Day, the newspaper noted that Ngaji sponsored the National Space Research and Development Agency Bill, 2008, and was very active in committee assignments, even though not as much in plenary.

In 2008 the National Boundary Commission and the Revenue Allocation Mobilisation and Fiscal Committee transferred control of various oil wells in the Sea of Bakassi from Cross River State to Akwa Ibom State. In July 2009, Gregory Ngaji declared: “What those two agencies have done is illegal and we will do everything to get our oil wells back.
