= 2019 Nigerian Senate elections in Cross River State =

2019 Nigerian Senate election in Lagos State

The 2019 Nigerian Senate election in Cross River State held on February 23, 2019, to elect members of the Nigerian Senate to represent Cross River State. Onor Sandy Ojang representing Cross River Central, Oko Rose Okoji representing Cross River North and Bassey Gershom Henry representing Cross River South all won on the platform of Peoples Democratic Party.

== Overview ==
Affiliation	Party		Total
Affiliation	APC	PDP	Total
Before Election	1	2	3
After Election	0	3	3

== Summary ==
District	Incumbent	Party	Elected Senator	Party
Cross River Central	John Owan Enoh	APC	Sandy Ojang Onor	PDP
Cross River North	Rose Oko Okoji	PDP	Rose Oko Okoji	PDP
Cross River South	Gershom Henry Bassey	PDP	Gershom Henry Bassey	PDP

== Results ==
=== Cross River Central ===
A total of 11 candidates registered with the Independent National Electoral Commission to contest in the election. PDP Sandy Ojang Onor candidate won the election, defeating APC candidate Ndoma-Egba and 9 other party candidates. Sandy received 56.63% of the votes, while Ndoma-Egba received 42.61%.

2019 Nigerian Senate election in Lagos State
Party	Candidate	Votes	%
APC	Ndoma Egba	60,298	42.61%
PDP	Sandy Ojang Onoh	80,134	56.63%
Others		1,068	0.75%
Total votes		141,500	100%
PDP hold			

=== Cross River North ===
A total of 12 candidates registered with the Independent National Electoral Commission to contest in the election. PDP candidate Rose Oko won the election, defeating APC candidate Wabily Nyiam and 10 other party candidates. Rose received 73.32% of the votes, while Nyiam received 26.23%.

2019 Nigerian Senate election in Cross State
Party	Candidate	Votes	%
APC	Wabily Nyiam	36,129	26.23%
PDP	Sandy Rose	100,967	73.32%
Others		1,209	0.87%
Total votes		137,705	100%
PDP hold			

=== Cross River South ===
A total of 11 candidates registered with the Independent National Electoral Commission to contest in the election. PDP candidate Bassey Gershom Henry won the election, defeating APC candidate Prince Otu and 9 other party candidates. Bassey received 54.51% of the votes, while Otu received 44.50%.

2019 Nigerian Senate election in Rivers State
Party	Candidate	Votes	%
APC	Prince Otu	63,250	44.50%
PDP	Bassey Gershom Henry	77,478	36.69%
Others		1,406	0.98%
Total votes		142,134	100%
PDP hold			

== 2020 Bye election ==
A bye election was held on 5 December 2020 in the Cross River North Senatorial District due to a vacancy following the demise of Rose Oko. Steven Odey of PDP contested against Joe Agi of Apc. They totalled 129,207 and 19,165 votes respectively. Odey was declared the winner by INEC.
