= Bassey Etim =

Nigerian politician

Senator Representing Akwa Ibom North-East

Personal details
- Party: Peoples Democratic Party

Bassey Etim is a Nigerian politician who served as a senator representing Akwa-Ibom North East Constituency. He was elected under the umbrella of the Peoples Democratic Party.

== Career ==
He was a former member of the House of Representatives before his election as a senator, he replaced Bassey Albert after his tenure ended. He was elected after an appeal court nullified the election of Bassey Albert, his opponent who was a returning senator to the house.

== Controversy ==
In 2018, Bassey Etim was accused of forgery and perjury. The Akwa Ibom State Government, through its Attorney General, Uwemedimo Nwoko Esq., filed a charge (HU/61C/2018) against him. Specifically, Etim was alleged to have, on or about December 7, 2014, in Uyo, forged a Peoples Democratic Party's 2014 Akwa Ibom North East (Uyo) Senatorial District primary election result sheet with serial number 0004759. The alleged forgery was stated to be contrary to Section 497 of the Criminal Code, Cap. 38, Vol. 2, Laws of Akwa Ibom State 2000. The High Court of Akwa Ibom State, sitting in Uyo, granted an ex-parte motion to serve Etim notice of hearing by substituted means, including publication in The Nation Newspaper and pasting notice within the court premises. The court adjourned the preliminary hearing to November 27, 2018. The allegations arose amidst an ongoing legal dispute between Etim and Senator Bassey Albert Akpan regarding the Akwa Ibom North East Senatorial District election. .
