= Akpap Okoyong =

- Village
- Interactive map of Akpap Okoyong
- Coordinates: 5°6′26.838″N 8°10′48.040″E
- Country: Nigeria
- State: Cross River State
- LGA: Odukpani
- Time zone: UTC+1 (WAT)

Akpap or Akpap-Okoyong is a village in the Okoyong area of Cross River State, Nigeria and is part of the Odukpani Local Government Area.

Akpap was home to the missionary Mary Slessor for some years. Her house was later converted to a rest home and clinic, and is now a tourist attraction.
