= Otuekong Raphael Bassey =

Nigerian politician

Chairman of Nsit Atai LGA
- In office 1999–2000

Commissioner of Housing
- In office July 2019 – March 2025

Personal details
- Died: 29 March 2025
- Other political affiliations: All Progressive Congress

Otuekong Raphael Bassey was a Nigerian politician who served as the Commissioner of Housing in Akwa Ibom State. He was appointed in July 2019 by Governor Udom Emmanuel and was reappointed in July 2023 by Governor Umo Eno.

== Background ==
Bassey hailed from Nsit Atai Local Government, Akwa Ibom state, Nigeria.

== Political career ==
Bassey served as a chairman of Nsit Atai LGA, 1999, under the umbrella of the All Progressive Congress (APC). He was also a member of the State Universal Basic Education Board, (SUBEB), Akwa Ibom State.

== Death ==
Otuekong passed on Saturday, 29 March 2025 in the hospital.
