= Michael Bassey =

Nigerian footballer (born 1987)

Personal information
- Full name: Michael Bassey Esang
- Date of birth: 14 October 1987 (age 39)
- Place of birth: Lagos, Nigeria
- Height: 1.83 m (6 ft 0 in)
- Position: Forward

Team information
- Current team: Shillong Lajong FC

Youth career
- 2003–2005: Igbino Babes
- 2006–2007: Enyimba Feeders

Senior career*
Years	Team	Apps	(Gls)
2008	Shillong Lajong FC	37	(2)
- * Club domestic league appearances and goals

Michael Bassey Esang (born 14 October 1987) is a Nigerian footballer. He played as a striker for Shillong Lajong FC in the I-League in India.
