= Mark Bassey =

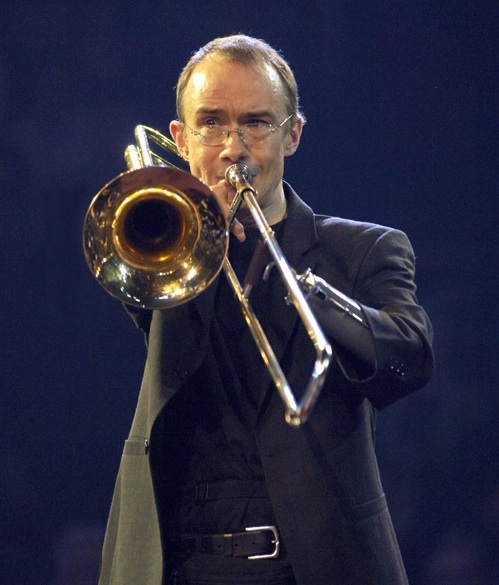
- Mark Bassey, jazz trombonist

Background information
- Born: 16 July 1961 (age 64)
- Origin: Sheffield, England
- Genres: mainstream, bop, contemporary
- Occupations: jazz musician, educator, composer, arranger, bandleader
- Instrument: Trombone
- Years active: 1982 - current
- Website: www.markbassey/

Mark Bassey (born, Sheffield, England, 1961) is a jazz trombonist, composer, arranger, educator and band leader.

== Biography ==
Bassey began playing the trombone at the age of 11. He studied linguistics at University College London from 1979 to 1982 but also found time to continue with his trombone studies, taking private lessons with Cliff Hardie. He also played in big bands at this time, notably the Brian Booth Jazz Orchestra (including Andy Panayi, Claude Deppa and Ralph Salmins). From 1983 - 1984 Bassey worked for the BBC in the Central Services Dept. During this time an opportunity arose to join Young Jazz (which later became Superjazz, led by Phil Revens). The experience of playing a week at Ronnie Scott’s with Young Jazz convinced him to become a professional trombonist.

Also in 1983, Bassey auditioned successfully for the European Youth Jazz Orchestra and in 1984 was offered the opportunity to take a study year at Trinity College of Music. There he studied classical trombone with Geoffrey Lindon, composition with Richard Arnell and big band jazz with Bobby Lamb. In 1985 he was invited, by Mark Nightingale, to join the National Youth Jazz Orchestra. During the subsequent decade he played with Loose Tubes, Brotherhood of Breath, Mike Westbrook, Stan Tracey and John Dankworth and Cleo Laine.

Bassey’s playing covers many styles from swing to bop, as well as more contemporary fields. Musical associations include Julian Arguelles, Alan Barnes, Liane Carroll, Mike Gibbs, Charlotte Glasson, Nikki Iles, Billy Jenkins and the BBC Big Band, Lemke-Nendza-Hillmann Trio, Daphna Sadeh, Terry Seabrook, Stan Sulzmann, Clark Tracey, Kenny Wheeler and Denis Colin. He has recorded widely with many people and released two albums under his own name: Mark Bassey’s Telling Stories and Bassey Plays Basie

Bassey is a jazz faculty member at the Royal Academy of Music and Trinity Laban Conservatoire of Music and Dance. He also has close links with the Guildhall School of Music & Drama and the City Literary Institute. He has been involved with jazz education since the mid-1980s, teaching trombone and running classes in harmony, improvisation, composition and arranging at many colleges in the UK including the Welsh College of Music & Drama, the Royal Northern College of Music, Leeds College of Music, Birmingham Conservatoire and Goldsmiths, University of London. He has been a regular tutor on many courses and workshops throughout the UK including Jazz School UK, Higham Hall, and the Jamey Aebersold Summer School (now defunct).Since 2015 Bassey has been running his own programme of classes on the South Coast (Brighton & Shoreham, East Sussex). Jazz Nuts & Bolts is a carefully developed series of weekly improvisation workshops which support a progression from beginner to advanced. Bassey also works in an educational role as a tutor/MD of various amateur ensembles.

Bassey has written over 30 big band arrangements (particularly for the National Youth Jazz Orchestra) - many original compositions and commissions including educational materials for the ABRSM and numerous other pieces for brass and sax ensembles (including Roger Argente’s Superbrass).

Bassey was born with no left hand and fingers missing on his right hand. He wears a split hook on his left arm, which he attaches to a piece of leather on his slide, and has a metal digit on his right hand which opposes the real finger. He plays left handed on a Rath 10 and a Bach 16, both with F attachments (to give him greater ease in reaching 6th and 7th positions) especially fitted by trombone maker Michael Rath,

== Discography ==
=== Albums as Leader ===
- Mark Bassey's Telling Stories (CD, 2007)
- Bassey Plays Basie (CD,2011)

=== As Sideman ===
- Wonderful Town! Original London Cast Recording (First Night Records,1986)
- Oxcentromania with Oxcentrics (Eccentric Records ECCD 001,1988)
- Shake! (How About A Sampling, Gene?) with Gene And Jim Are Into Shakes (Rough Trade RTT 216R (12"),1988)
- Shall We Dance with The Piccadilly Dance Orchestra (Jay Productions CDVIR 8326, 1993)
- New Reasons To Use Old Words with Links, Wolfgang Mirbach (Musikerhof ST9501, 1995)
- I Won't Dance with The Piccadilly Dance Orchestra (Jay Productions CDVIR 8329, 1995)
- Bar Utopia with The Mike Westbrook Orchestra (ENJA Records,1995)
- Let's Face The Music with The Piccadilly Dance Orchestra (Jay Productions CDJAY 1259, 1997)
- A Quiet Eye with June Tabor (Topic Records, 1997)
- Cold And Bouncy with The High Llamas (V2 Music VVR1000732, 1998)
- Afro-Saxon with Alex Wilson (Candid Records BCCD 79201, 1998)
- Too Good To Miss with The Sloane Square Syncopators (Chugnut Records CD 0015, 1998)
- Samba Da Alegria with The London Latin Jazz Ensemble (LLJE 001, 1998)
- A Marvellous Party with The Piccadilly Dance Orchestra (Jay Productions CDVIR 8333, 1999)
- Zenoria with The Blowpipes (Harmonia Mundi BPCD 01, 1999)
- Snowbug with The High Llamas (V2 Music VVR1008978, 1999)
- Birthdays, Birthdays with The Stan Sulzmann Big Band (Village Life 9108VL LC2821, 1999)
- Zufolo with Special Sphere (Evolve E95259, 1999)
- Escapade with The Julian Arguelles Octet (Provocateur Records, 1999)
- Skull View with The Julian Arguelles Octet (Babel Label, 1999)
- Cobra & Phases Group Play Voltage in the Milky Night with Stereolab (Elektra, 1999)
- Nobody Else But Me with Laura Zakian (Ultimate Groove UG CD 07–0201, 2000)
- After A Journey with The Nigel Waddington Jazz Orchestra (Nuts CD 0016, 2000)
- Esto Es Amor with George Peguero (Scorpion Records CD-E007 D, 2000)
- Just One of Those Things with Laura Zakian (Dancing Rhino Records, 2001)
- Introducing the Euro All Stars with Renato D'Aiello (Spotlight Jazz, 2001)
- Some Times with Ingrid Laubrock (Candid Records, 2001)
- Mbawula with Southern Grooves (Dancing Rhino Records MBDR001, 2002)
- New Memories with The Hans Koller Jazz Ensemble (33 Records 33JAZZ070, 2002)
- Slovo with Nommo (Rufflife Records B00006F1MQ, 2002)
- Reunion with Don Rendell (Spotlight Jazz, 2002)
- Institutions with Sarah Blair & the Union (Establishment Records, 2003)
- Keep It Cool with Alphabeat on album Klubbjazz 5 (Slip n Slide SLIPCD 160, 2004)
- Atlas with Guida De Palma & Jazzinho (Freestyle Records FSRCD011, 2006)
- Large n-semble with Jeff Chambers Variable n-tet (JCVNCD001P, 2006)
- Milk & Honey with Prince Fatty - feat Hollie Cook (Mr Bongo 7"/CD/MP3, 2007)
- Astral Pleasures with Issie Barratt Big Band (Fuzzy Moon Records FUZ001, 2008)
- Directing 14 Jackson Pollocks with Graham Collier (Jazz Continuum GCM 2009, 2009)
- Reconciliation with Daphna Sadeh & The Voyagers (Tzadik TZ 8134, 2009)
- Charlotte's World Wide Web with Charlotte Glasson (Surrey Street Records SSR 007, 2010)
- Tria Lingvo with Lemke-Nendza-Hillmann (JazzSick Records 5035 JS, 2010)
- Special One with Steve Melling Clark Tracey Special Septet (Melljazz Records MJCD 007, 2010)
- Crossing Wires with Lianne Hall (Malinki Records LP/DL, 2010)
- Evensong In Blue with The Will Todd Ensemble (St Martin-in-the-Fields B004YCA4TM, 2011)
- Playground with Charlotte Glasson (Surrey Street Records SSR 008, 2011)
- Up and Down with Liane Carroll (Quiet Money Recordings / Proper Records B0054DFIBO, 2011)
- Lyric Pieces with The Martin Pickett Group (Slam CD 286, 2011)
- Amazwi with Mbawula (Dancing Rhino Records MBDR003, 2012)
- Charlotte Glasson 'Live' with Charlotte Glasson (Surrey Street Records SSR 009, 2012)
- Relook with Graham Collier (Jazz Continuum, 2012)
- Better Than The Blues with Neal Richardson (Splash Point Music SPR015CD, 2014)
- Luminosity with Graham Collier (Jazz Continuum GCM 2014, 2014)
- Festivus with Charlotte Glasson (Surrey Street Records SSR 010, 2014)
- Lightly Does It with Annie Lightly (AL 2016)
