= Sandy Ojang Onor =

Nigerian politician (born 1966)

Senator for Cross River Central
- In office 11 June 2019 – 11 June 2023
- Preceded by: John Owan Enoh
- Succeeded by: Eteng Jonah Williams

Personal details
- Born: Sandy Ojang Onor; 14 February 1966 (age 60) Ikom, Eastern Region (now in Cross River State), Nigeria
- Party: Peoples Democratic Party
- Education: University of Calabar

Sandy Ojang Onor (born 14 February 1966) is a Nigerian politician who served as the senator representing Cross River Central Senatorial District from 2019 to 2023. He was elected in 2019 to represent Cross River Central Senatorial District in the 9th Assembly of the Senate. He is a member of the Peoples Democratic Party (PDP). He was chosen as the Presidential candidate for the Peoples Democratic Party (PDP) for the upcoming 2027 Nigerian Presidential Election.

== Early life and education ==
Sandy Ojang Onor was born in the city of Ikom in Ikom Local Government Area of Cross River State. In his early education, he attended St. Francis, FSLC 1971 – 1975 and St. Brendan's GEC (O level) 1976 – 1981 all of which are both in Obubra LGA. Onor University education was in the University of Calabar, where he studied History. Graduating with a Bachelor of Arts degree (Second Class (Upper Division) 1983 – 1987. He holds a Doctor of Philosophy (PhD) in History from the University of Calabar 1988 – 1993.

== Personal life ==
Onor is currently married, he is a devoted Christian an educationist, administrator and philanthropist.

He wrote books, several articles and has influenced many policies in the Nigerian-Cross River State Local Government System.

== Authorship ==
- Imbua, David L., Onor, Sandy O. & Odey, Patick O. A (Ed.) Companion to African History in the Nineteenth and Twentieth Centuries. Makurdi, Aboki Publishers, 2017.
- Omagu, Donald O. & Onor, Sandy O. (Ed.) The Nigeria Civil War: Narratives from Some Border Communities. London: Bahiti & Dalila Publishers, 2016.
- Onor, Sandy Ojang. The Ejagham Nation in the Cross River Region of Nigeria. Ibadan: Kraft Books, 1994; Reprinted by Aboki Publishers, Makurdi 2016.
- Onor, Sandy Ojang. Local Governance in Nigeria: Evolution, Growth, Problems and Solutions. Lagos: Amazingrafiks Limited, 2005.

== Awards and recognitions ==
- Best Graduating Student In History, University of Calabar 1987
- Professor Eyo Ita Prize for Best Graduating Student in History, University of Calabar 1987
- Chief Ekanem Ita Prize for Best Graduating Student in History University of Calabar 1987
- NLC Prize for Excellence in Labour Management in Cross River State 2001
- Honorary Fellow, Chartered Institute of Local Government and Public Administration of Nigeria 2001
- Member Historical Society of Nigeria.

== Administrative Experiences ==
- Director Duraform Company Ltd. Ikom 1993
- Executive Chairman, Etung Local Government Council, Cross River State 1999 – 2002
- State Chairman, Association of Local Government of Nigeria (ALGON), Cross River State Chapter 1999 – 2002
- Deputy National President of ALGON 1999 – 2002
- Chairman, Local Government Service Commission 2004 – 2008
- Commissioner For Agriculture 2010 – 2011
- Commissioner for Environment 2012 – 2013
