= Ijegu =

Community in Cross River State, Nigeria

Ijegu is a community in Yala Local Government Area of Cross River State, Nigeria. Ijegu is made up of four (4) communities namely Ore, Ogohu, Oke and O’onyi.Ijegu seats on the coastal belt of Okpoku flowing through river niger.It is home of the Agi(s) (late Malachy Ogar Agi, late Chief Fidelis Aju Ogar, Pa Ehlebi Oko, Sir Livinus Agi, Prof. Simon Peter Imaje Agi, late Paul Oloko Agi FCAs P I Agi jr, SAN Joe Agi, Comr.(Hon) Ogar Emmanuel Oko (the Ijegu Ojor Public Relations Officer and the publisher of the RABBIT PUNCH), Barr. Denis Ogidi Ogar, Mr. Anthony Ohobu Ehlebi, Chief Michael Oko Ehlebi, Barr. Emmanuel Oheta Agi etc.), late Professor Oko, Professor Edde Iji. Three (3) professors at the prestigious University of Calabar. The people belongs to the Yala tribe and its members speak the Yala language. They are mostly farmers. His Royal Highness, Emri Ipuole is the clan head of the autonomous community.

== See also ==
- Cross River State
- Yala, Nigeria
