= Baze University =

Private university in Abuja, Nigeria

- Motto: Learn to live
- Type: Private
- Established: 2011; 15 years ago
- Founder: Sen. Yusuf Datti Baba-Ahmed
- Chancellor: Sen. Yusuf Datti Baba-Ahmed
- Vice-Chancellor: Prof Kathleen Okafor
- Location: Abuja, Federal Capital Territory, Nigeria; 9.00731°N 7.40596°E
- Campus: Urban
- Colours: Gray; White
- Website: bazeuniversity.edu.ng
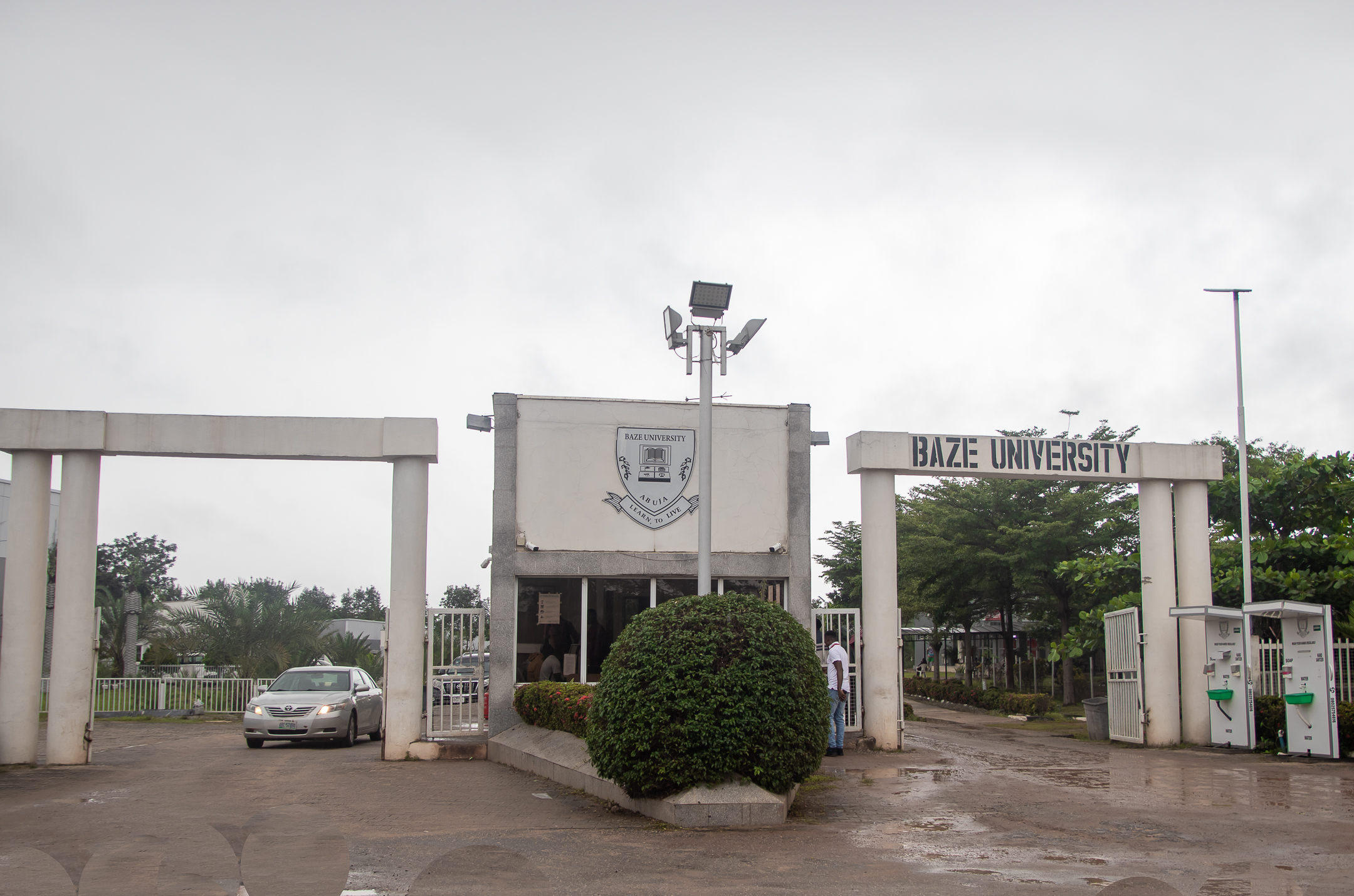

Baze University is a private tertiary institution established in 2011 and located in Abuja, Nigeria.

== History and governance ==
The university was established in 2011 and received its provisional license from the National Universities Commission (NUC) on 7 March of the same year. Academic activities commenced with staff and 17 students all in one building on the site of its 50,000 sqm campus.

Construction of the Administrative Block, the Faculty of Law, the Faculty of Computing and Applied Sciences, Faculty of Engineering, the Faculty of Environmental Sciences and the Faculty of Medical and Health Sciences soon followed.

In 2021, construction of the University Teaching Hospital commenced and was expected to be completed in the same year. The university features a library, staff housing Complex and a students' hostel consisting of two blocks for males and females with a capacity for 500 students each. The university has had six consecutive convocation ceremonies and has produced graduates in various academic disciplines.

== Academics ==
The university offers various academic programmes for undergraduate and post-graduate degrees. A total of 43 undergraduate degree programs are run at the university under the following faculties:

- Faculty of Management and Social Sciences
- Faculty of Law
- Faculty of Computing and Applied Sciences
- Faculty of Engineering
- Faculty of Environmental Sciences
- Faculty of Medical and Health Sciences

While the postgraduate school offers the following degree programs:

- M.Sc. Animal and Environmental Science
- M.Sc. Chemistry
- M.Sc. Computer Science
- M.Sc. Economics
- M.Sc. International Relations And Diplomacy
- M.Sc. Management MMAN
- M.Sc. Mass Communication MMAC
- M.Sc. Parasitology MPAR
- M.Sc. Public Administration
- M.Sc. Sociology MSOC
- M.Sc. Intelligence and Global Security
- M.Sc. Security, Leadership and Society
- Masters of Business Administration (MBA)
- Masters of Law (LLM)

== Accreditation and partnerships ==
Baze University held its fourth convocation ceremony in 2017 with former president Goodluck Jonathan in attendance

In 2017, the Association of Certified Chartered Accountants (ACCA) entered a collaborative partnership with the university to integrate and embed ACCA curriculum into the university curriculum to assist efforts to grow the number of finance and accounting professionals in Africa.

In 2016, the government of Sokoto state transferred 39 of its students sponsored to study in Dubai from various universities in the United Arab Emirates to Baze University, Abuja in a bid to reduce the cost of study sponsorship - a consequence of the recession.

== Gallery ==
Campus of Baze University Abuja, Nigeria

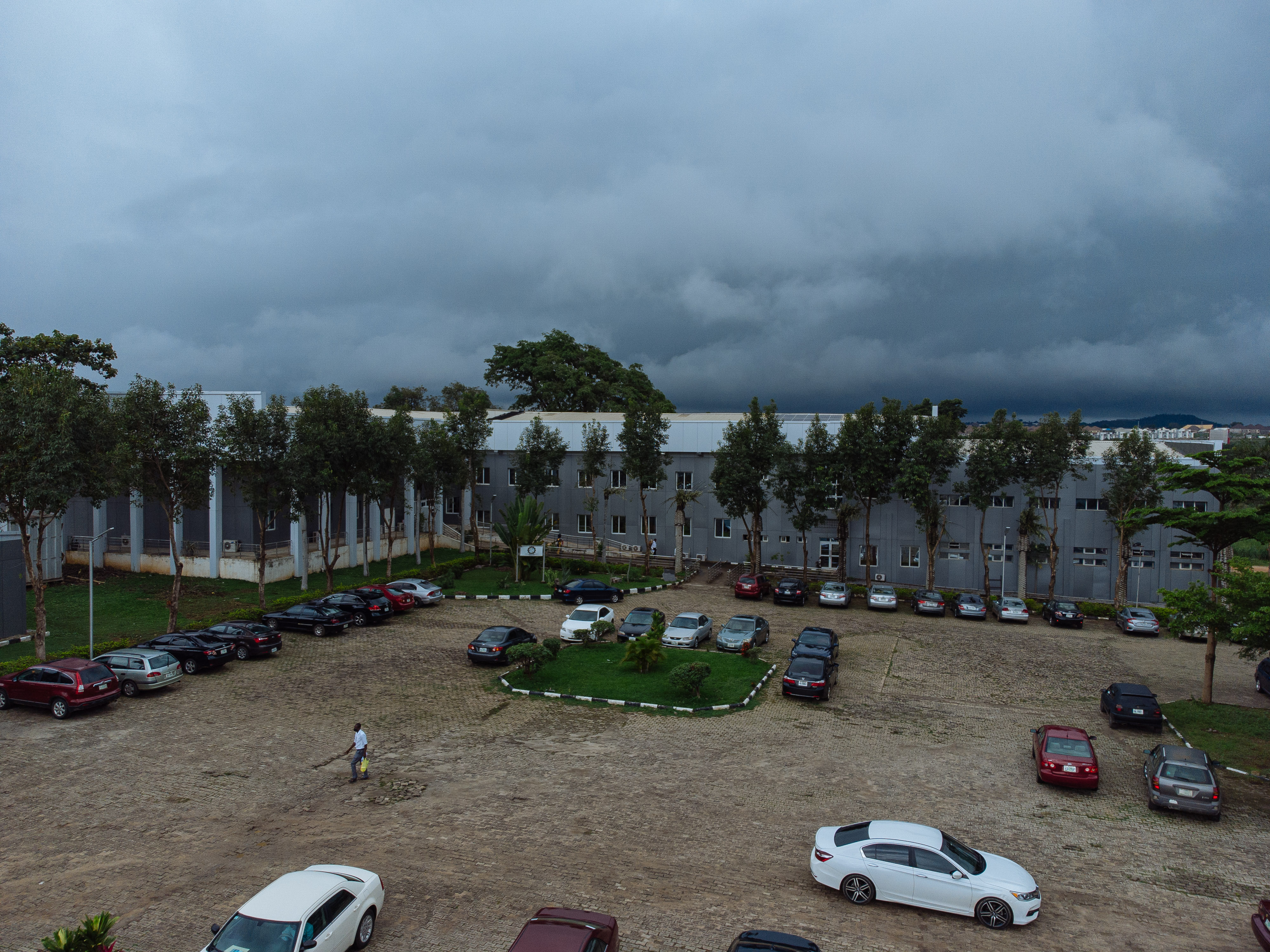
The Block D (Rose Okwechime) building that houses the Faculty of Engineering

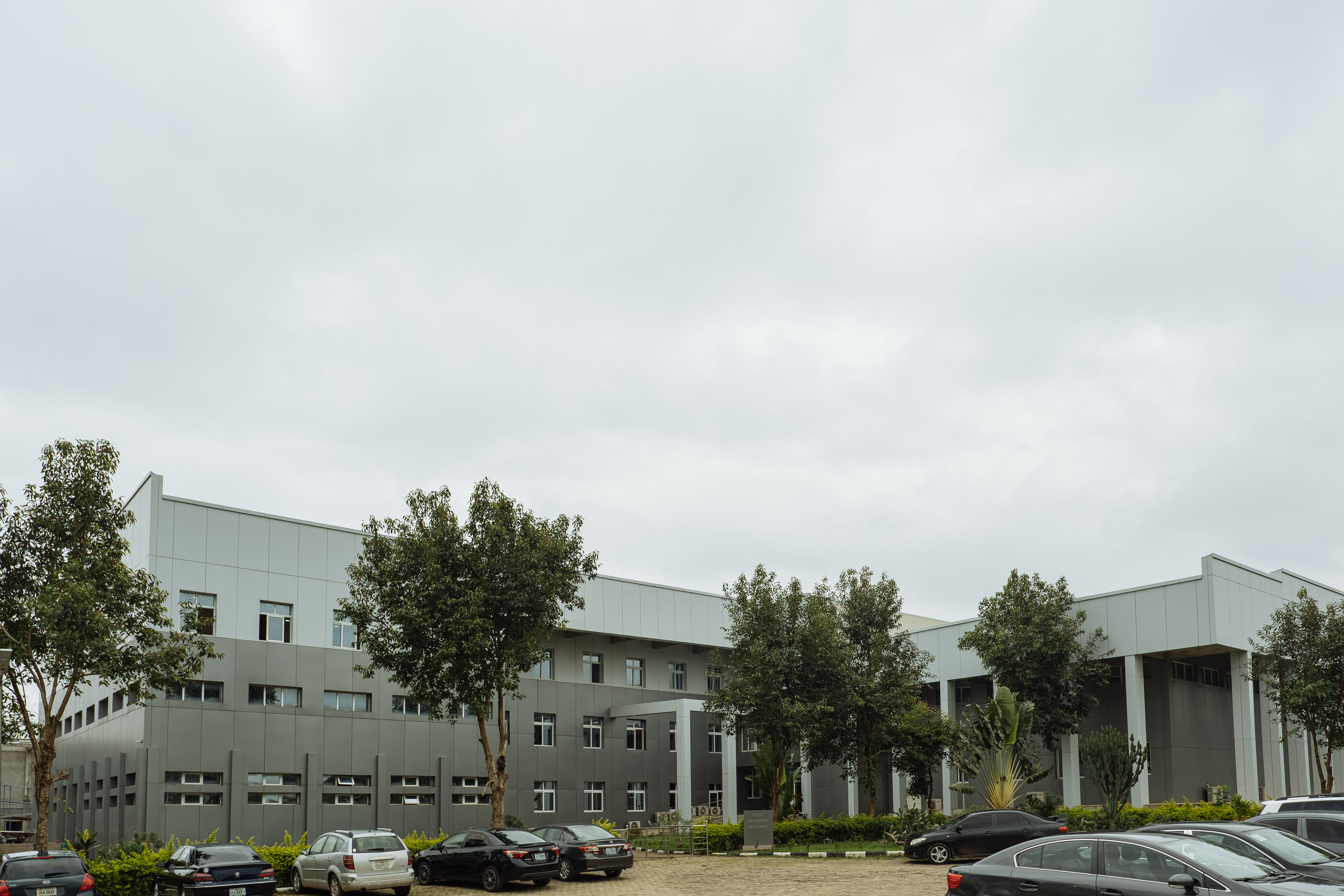
The Block F (Aliyu Modibbo) building that houses the Faculty of Environmental

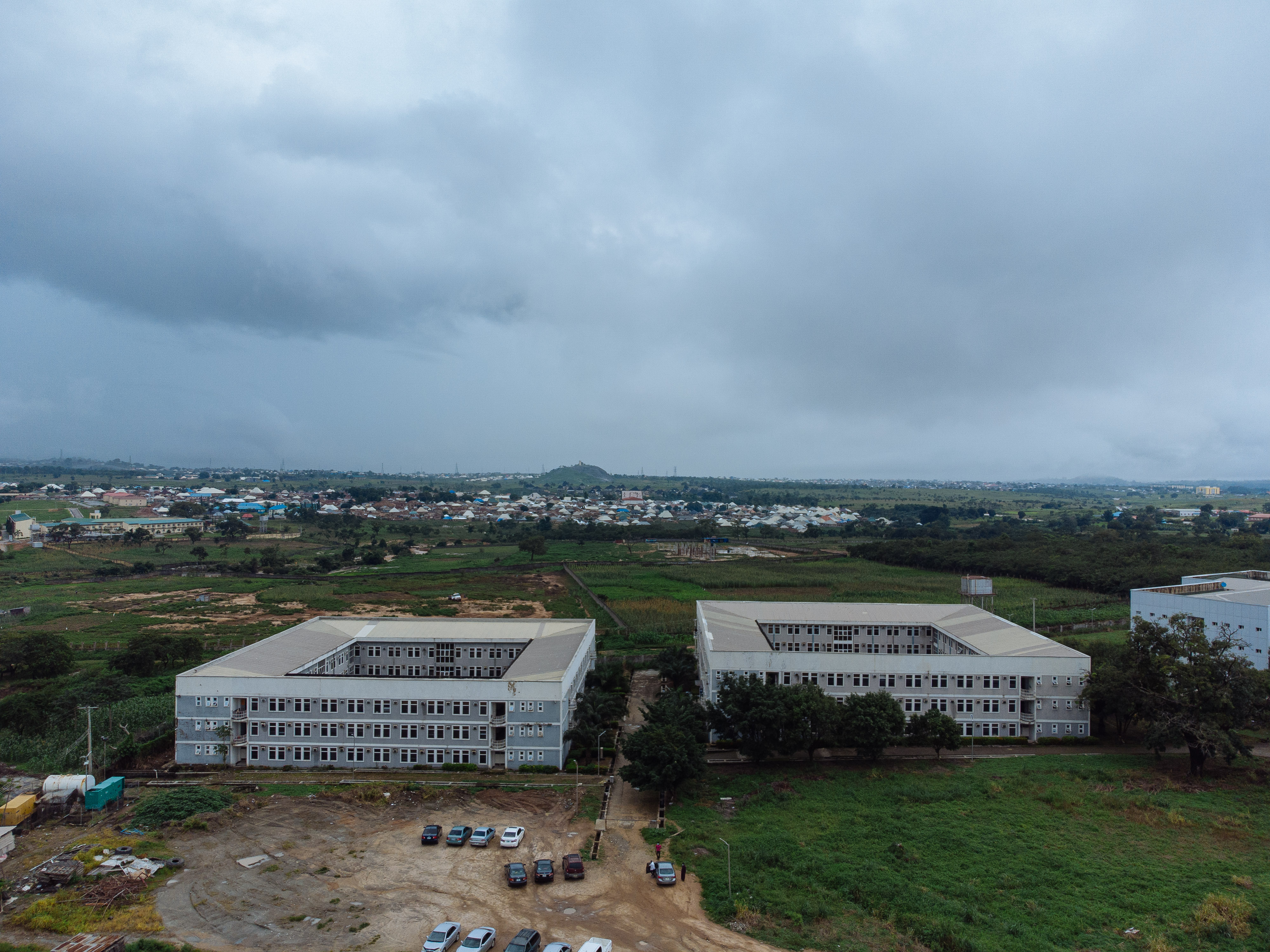
Students' Hostels: Male

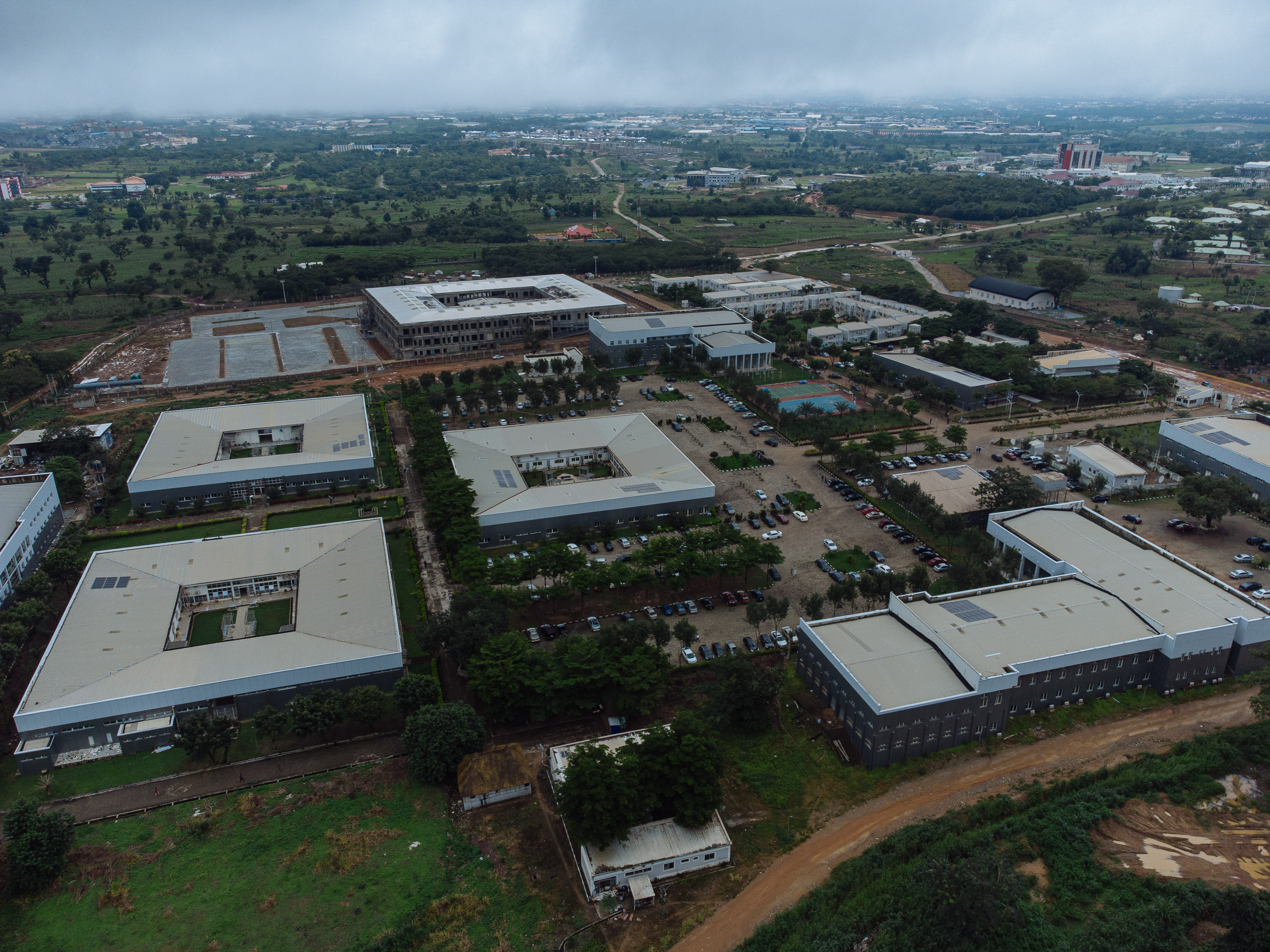
Aerial view of the Baze University campus grounds in Abuja Nigeria.

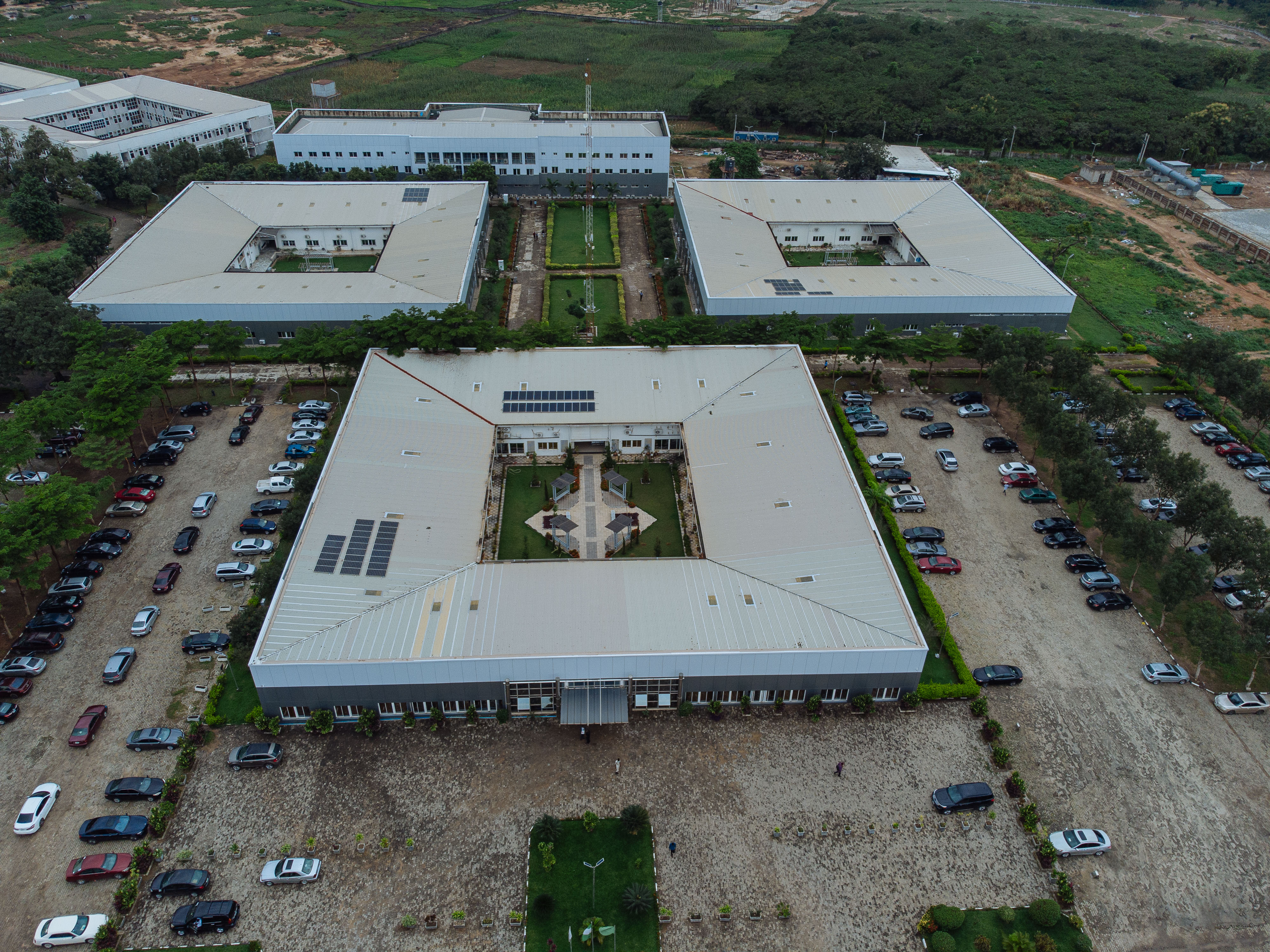
Blocks A, B, C, E and the female hostel

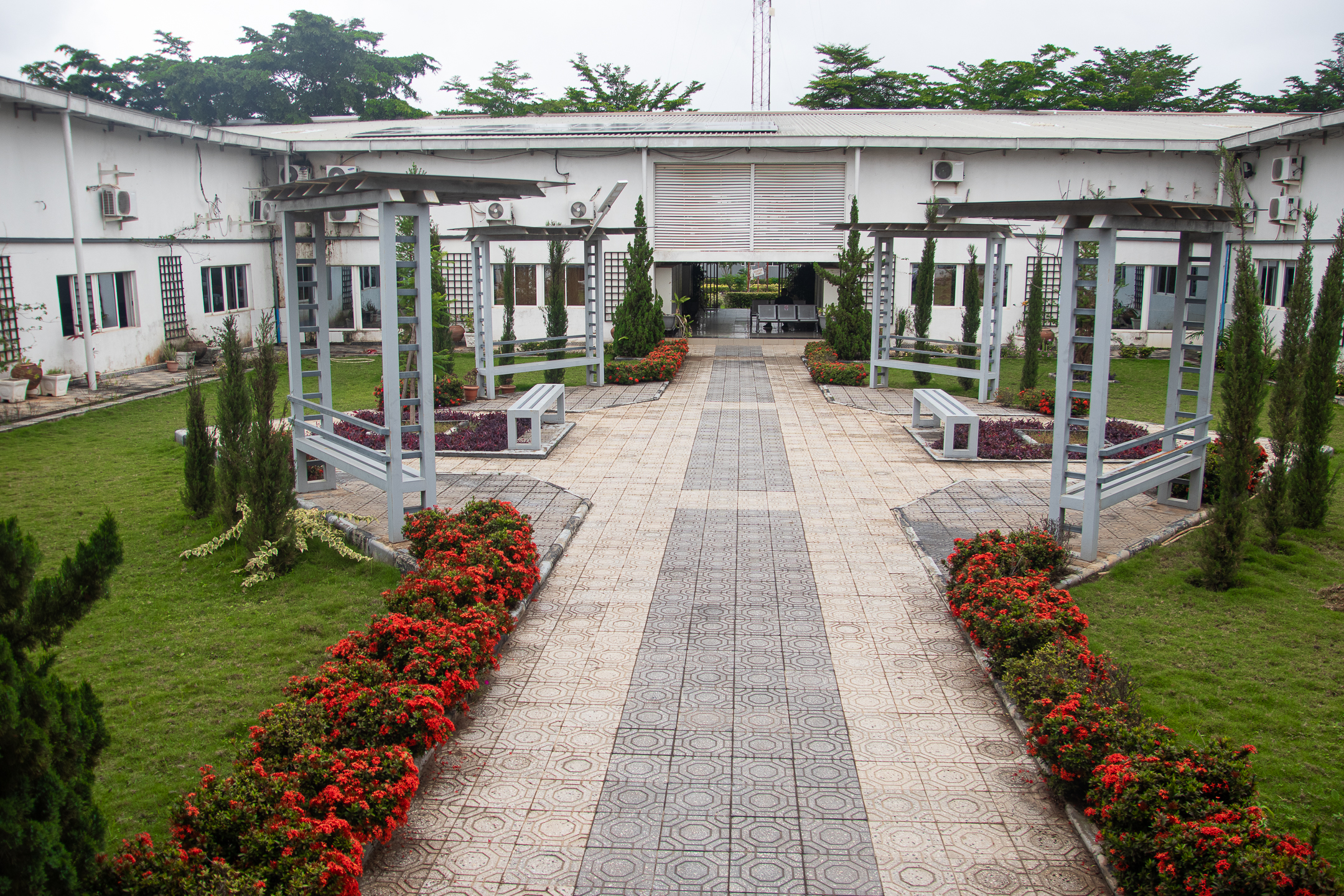
Inside Block A (Faculty of Management and Social Sciences), Baze University

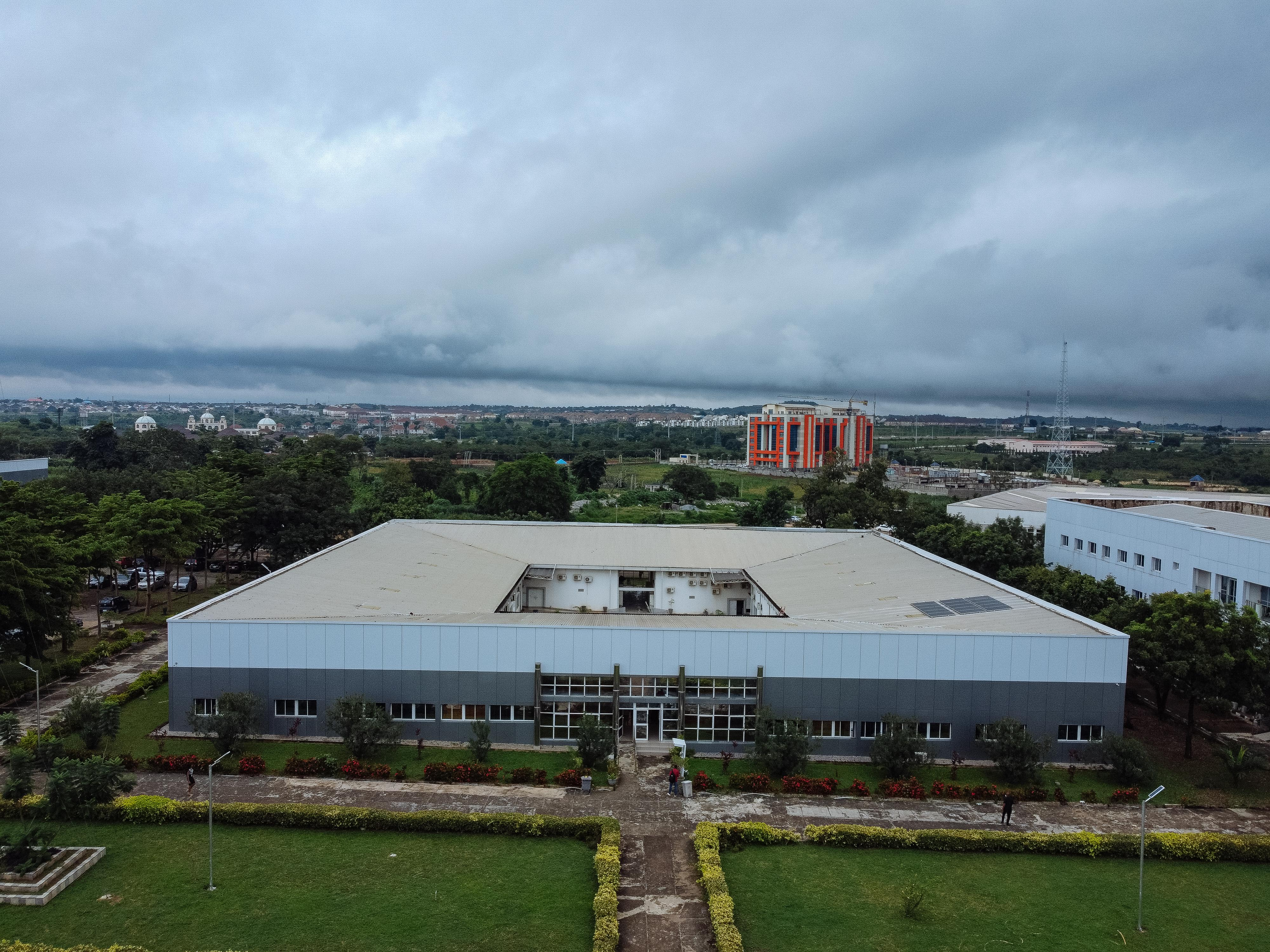
Elevated view of block B (Faculty of Computing and Applied Sciences)

== Notable alumni ==
- Osita Chidoka - Past Minister of Aviation in Nigeria
- Dino Melaye - Former Nigerian Senator
- Rotimi Amaechi - Former Rivers State Governor and Minister of Transportation
