= Bassey Dan-Abia =

Nigerian politician (b. 1957)

- Born: August 23, 1957 (age 69); Eket, Akwa-Ibom State
- Education: University of Lagos
- Occupation: legal practitioner
- Political party: All Progressives Congress (2016–present)
- Spouse: Christine Dan-Abia
- Children: Betse Bassey Dan-Abia
- Parent: Abia Abasi-Eyo

Bassey Dan-Abia (born August 23, 1957) is a Nigerian politician. Before entering politics, he practiced as a lawyer in Kano, Cross River and Lagos States of Nigeria.

Dan-Abia was born and raised in Afaha Ekpenedi Village in Esit Eket Local Government Area of Akwa Ibom State and received a law degree from the University of Lagos. He started his private law practice in 1995. He later became the Attorney-General and Commissioner for Justice Akwa Ibom State and MD/CEO of the Niger Delta Development Commission (NDDC) in 2013. He was sacked by President Muhammadu Buhari in 2015. In 2016, it was alleged that Bassey Dan-Abia held no intention to challenge Governor Udom Emmanuel in 2019, however Dan-Abia entered the 2019 Akwa Ibom State gubernatorial race against Udom Emmanuel as a member of the All Progressives Congress.

== Career ==
In 1981, Dan-Abia began his career as a legal adviser at the State Criminal Investigation Department, Kano State Police Command where he satisfied the requirement for the National Youth Service. Dan-Abia proceeded to work at the law firm of Dickson Osuala & Company in Lagos, Nigeria. He subsequently joined the Ministry of Justice, Cross River State as State Counsel. He left the ministry in 1983 and was employed with Icon Merchant Bank Limited as a legal adviser. Dan-Abia was promoted to Company Secretary/Legal Adviser and then to Deputy Manager and to the position of manager at the bank. In January 1994, Dan-Abia was appointed Special Assistant/Adviser to the Minister of Petroleum & Mineral Resources by the Federal Government of Nigeria succeeding another Akwa Ibom son, Chief Udo Udoma.

In 1995, after attachment with the law firm of Lawrence Graham in London, he set up his law firm, Dan-Abia Chambers at Onikan, Lagos, Nigeria and RCC Road, Eket, Akwa Ibom State. He was the Principal of the law firm till he was appointed as Attorney-General and Commissioner for Justice.

Dan-Abia became Akwa Ibom State’s Attorney-General and Commissioner for Justice from August 2003 till October 2006. In May 2007, he represented Akwa Ibom State on the 2nd Board of the Niger Delta Development Commission till April 2009, as well as on the 3rd Governing Board of the NDDC, between August 2009-September 2011. Dan-Abia served as the Akwa Ibom State Commissioner for Transport between April 2012-June 2013, and Akwa Ibom State Commissioner for Housing & Urban Renewal in 2013.

In December 2013, Dan-Abia became the MD/CEO of the Niger Delta Development Commission (NDDC) despite some petitions against his nomination till December 2015, when he was fired by Presidenent Muhammadu Buhari and replaced by Ibim Semenitari. His removal was later challenged at the Federal High Court sitting in Uyo, Akwa Ibom State.
