= Cross River Central senatorial district =

Senatorial district in Nigeria

Cross River Central senatorial district (Middle Cross River or Midcross) in Cross River State covers six local governments which include Abi, Yakurr, Obubra, Ikom, Etung and Boki. The current representative of Cross River Central is Senator Eteng Jonah Williams of the All Progressives Congress(APC).

== List of senators representing Cross River Central ==
Senator	Party	Year	Assembly
Liyel Imoke	NRC	1992–1993	
Matthew T. Mbu Jr	PDP	1999–2003	4th
Victor Ndoma-Egba	PDP	2003–2015	5th, 6th, 7th
John Owan Enoh	PDP	2015–2019	8th
Sandy Ojang Onor	PDP	2019-2023	9th
Eteng Jonah Williams	APC	2023-till date	10th
