= Eteng Jonah Williams =

Nigerian politician

Speaker Cross River State House of Assembly
- In office June 2019 – June 2023

Senator of the federal republic of Nigeria representing Cross River Central Senatorial District
- In office June 2023 – present

Personal details
- Born: 30 December 1969 (age 56) Mkpani, Yakurr Cross River State, Nigeria
- Party: All Progressives Congress (2021–present)
- Education: University of Calabar
- Occupation: Politician

Eteng Jonah Williams (born 30 December 1969) is a Nigerian Senator representing Cross River Central Senatorial District or Middle Cross River (Midcross) and the Former Speaker of the Cross River State House of Assembly.

== Education and career ==
Eteng hails from Mkpani in Yakurr Local government area in Cross River State, he is a 3 term member representing Yakurr II State Constituency from 2011 to 2023, he was chairman House Committee on Finance and Appropriation, Vice chairman House Committee on Business and Rules, Member House Committee on Public Account, member House Committee on Health Service, Women affairs, Social Welfare and Gender Development all in the 7th and 8th Assembly. He later emerged Speaker at the 9th assembly.

Eteng holds a master's degree in Public Administration from the University of Calabar, he has over 25 years working experience in Administration before delving into politics. He was the Head of Administration at Jones-Tech International Limited before emerging victorious at his election to represent Yakurr II State Constituency in the Cross River State House of Assembly.

He also worked with the office of the Organization for African Unity, OAU chairman (documentation Unit), at the Presidency where he was in charge of compilation and writing of the research project entitled "OAU Abuja 91 Commemorative handbook".

Eteng Jonah Williams has attended seminars/conferences in Nigeria and the United States of America. He is a member of Nigeria America Chamber of Commerce and Industry and was on the Board of Jones-Tech International limited and Enonye Ventures Limited.

Eteng was a member of the Peoples democratic party since 1999 before defecting to the All Progressive Congress in June 2021.

Under his watch as Speaker, the House of Assembly passed the Cross River State House of Assembly Service Commission Bill 2020, the Judiciary Funds Management Bill 2021 as well as the Legislature Funds Management Bill 2021 into law.

In his first year in office as a Senator, Eteng sponsored three bills, including the Nuclear Security and Safety bill, and moved five far-reaching motions. He was also appointed Chairman of the 10th Senate Committee on Petroleum Resources (Upstream).

== Personal life ==
Eteng Jonah Williams is married and has three children.

== See also ==
2023 Nigerian Senate elections in Cross River State
