= Victor Ndoma-Egba =

Nigerian politician

Sen. Victor Ndoma-Egba CON, OFR, SAN LLB, LLM

Chairman
- Niger Delta Development Commission
- In office July 2016 – January 2019
- Preceded by: Bassey Dan-Abia
- Succeeded by: Nelson Braimbraifa (acting)

Senator of the Federal Republic of Nigeria from Cross River Central Senatorial District
- In office 2003–2007
- Succeeded by: John Owan Enoh
- Constituency: Cross River Central

Personal details
- Born: 8 March 1956 (age 70)
- Party: All Progressives Congress
- Other political affiliations: People's Democratic Party (previous)
- Education: University of Lagos University of Calabar
- Profession: Politician Lawyer
- Awards: Commander of the Order of the Niger; Officer of the Order of the Federal Republic; Senior Advocate of Nigeria
- Website: ndomaegbaebri.com

Victor Ndoma-Egba CON OFR SAN (born 8 March 1956) is a Nigerian politician and former chairman of the Niger Delta Development Commission (NDDC). He was a three-term Senator, representing Cross River Central Senatorial District of Cross River State in the Nigerian Senate from 2003 to 2015.

== Background ==
Victor Ndoma-Egba was born on 8 March 1956 in Ikom, Cross River State. He has an LL.B degree from the University of Lagos and an LLM degree from the University of Calabar. He was called to the Nigerian Bar in 1978, and was elevated to the rank of Senior Advocate of Nigeria (SAN) in 2004. He has been Chairman of the Nigerian Bar Association, Calabar Branch, and President of the Calabar Chamber of Commerce. He has also been Director of the Cross River Basin and Rural Development Authority, and Honourable Commissioner for Works & Transport in Cross Rivers State.

== Political career ==
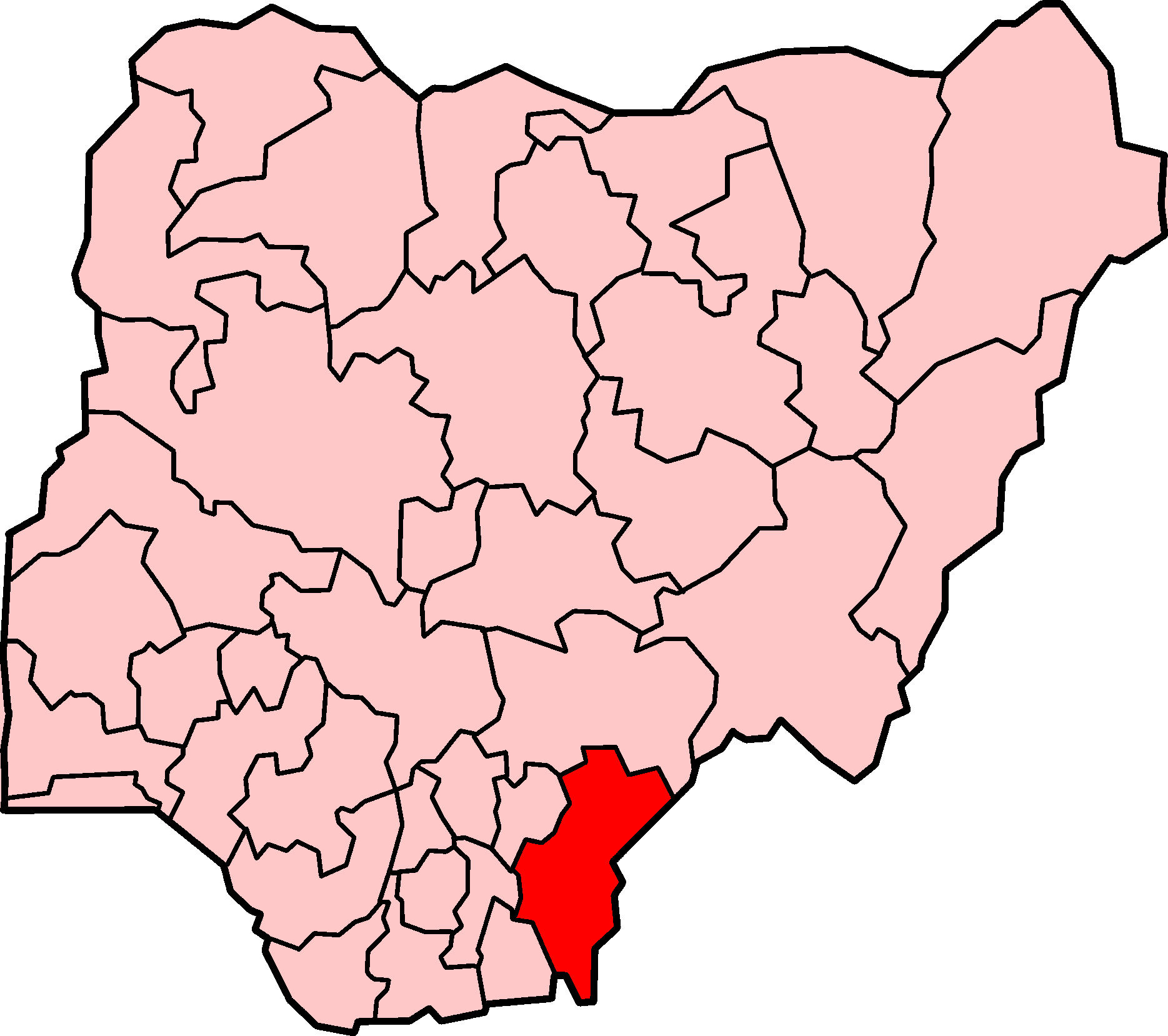
Cross River State in Nigeria

Running as a People's Democratic Party (PDP) candidate, Ndoma-Egba was elected as senator in the 5th (2003–2007) National Assembly representing Cross River Central Senatorial District, and was reelected in 2007 for a further four-year term. Senator Ndoma-Egba is a member of senate committees on Upstream Petroleum Resources, Human Rights and Legal Matters, and Information and Media, and is deputy chairman of the Judiciary Committee of the Nigerian Senate.

In May 2008, Ndoma-Egba spoke in favor of reform of the Nigeria Police Act, which came into effect on April 1, 1943 and has essentially been unchanged since that time. In May 2009, he accused the Action Congress Party of delays in listing the 37 Local Council Development Areas in Lagos State in the Constitution of the Federal Republic of Nigeria. Representative Bola Gbabijo refuted these charges.

In September 2009 Ndoma-Egba noted that several prominent people in Cross River had defected from the Action Congress and the All Nigeria Peoples Party (ANPP) to join the PDP, saying the event was a sign that opposition has crumbled in the state. In January 2013 Ndoma-Egba said that the solution to Cross River community clashes was the National Boundary Commission becoming involved in the demarcation of boundary lines.

Ndoma-Egba was reelected as Senator for Cross River Central on 26 April 2011 on the PDP platform, winning 143,537 votes, while the runner up was Patric Iwara of the Action Congress of Nigeria (ACN), who gained 47,656 votes.

Following disagreements in PDP, he joined the All Peoples Congress (APC) in November 2015. He was Deputy Leader of the 6th Senate (2007–2011) and Leader of the Senate (2011–2015). He returned to his law practice as Senior Partner in the Law Firm of Ndoma-Egba, Ebri & Co in Abuja. In July 2016, he was appointed Chairman of the Niger Delta Development Commission (NDDC) by President Muhammadu Buhari.

== Personal life ==
Ndoma-Egba is born to late Justice Emmanuel Ndoma-Egba, a Justice of the Court of Appeal of Nigeria, and Madam Regina Nentui, a school teacher and local, the first female chairman of a Local Government Area in Nigeria. He is a devout Catholic and has made significant donations to the Catholic church in his home town of Ikom. Ndoma-Egba married with three children.
