= Okuku, Cross River State =

Town in Yala, Cross River State, Nigeria

Okuku is a town in Cross River State, Nigeria. It is one of the major towns in Yala Local Government Area. There is a strategic grain silo in Okuku, and the Faculty of Basic Medical Sciences of the Cross River University of Technology (CRUTECH Okuku campus) is also located there. Both were commissioned by former deputy governor Chief Dr. Matthias Oko Offoboche between 1979 and 1983.

== See also ==
- Cross River State
- Yala, Nigeria
