= Yala, Nigeria =

Yala Iyala
- LGA
- Interactive map of Yala
- Location in Nigeria
- Coordinates: 6°42′N 8°36′E
- Country: Nigeria
- State: Cross River State
- Headquarters: Okpoma

Government
  - Local Government Chairman: Fabian Odey-Ogbeche

Area
  - Total: 1,739 km^{2} (671 sq mi)

Population (2006 census)
  - Total: 210,843
  - Density: 121.2/km^{2} (314.0/sq mi)
- Time zone: UTC+1 (WAT)
- 3-digit postal code prefix: 550
- ISO 3166 code: NG.CR.YL
- Website: www.crossriverhub.com.ng/yala

Yala is a Local Government Area in Cross River State, Nigeria. Its headquarters is in the town of Okpoma in the east of the area at 6°35′35″N 8°38′01″E.

It has an area of 1,739 km^{2} and a population of 210,843 at the 2006 census. This makes Yala the second most populated LGA in Cross River State, coming after Akpabuyo.

The postal code of the area is 550.

The dominant tribe in the Area are the Yala. Major settlements in Yala LGA include Okpoma, Okuku, Yahe, Ugaga, Ijegu, Oloko-Ogwope and Oloko- Ipuole, Imaje, Oke, Echumoga, Woda, Ebo, Igede Edii Nation, Itekpa, Maa, Wonye, Uchu, Osina, Mbuor, Aliforkpa, Echumofana, Wanihem, Wanikade, Wanokom, Ijiraga, Mfuma, Ntrigom etc. Kukelle and Yala are the languages spoken by some inhabitants of Yalaland.

Other major tribes in Yala Local Government Area are, Igede-Edii (Anyadaha, Anyugbe, Eminyi, Ibilla, Igbakobor and Opiriku), Itekpa, Gabu, Ukelle and Yache. They speak Igede, Kukelle and Yache language respectively.

The LGA has an abundant salt deposit which can sustain any small to medium-scale salt industry. There are many salt ponds in Okpoma, which are of great historical significance to the people and are mined locally. The LGA also offers a wide range of investment opportunities in agro-based industries as well as solid mineral industries.

== History ==
The Yala people are closely related to the Idoma people of Benue state, Nigeria and can understand their language. It is said that the Yala people left Benue state in search of salt, having found it in abundance in present day Yala, decided to stay. The Ukelle people on the other hand are kins to the Orring people found in both Benue and Ebonyi state. These people are the Ufia (Utonkon people); Ntezi, Effium, Okpoto, Amuda and Okpolo people respectively.

== Geography ==
Yala LGA has an average temperature of 25 degrees Celsius (77 degrees Fahrenheit) and a total area of 1,739 square kilometres (671 square miles). The LGA is home to numerous rivers, streams, and creeks as well as substantial forest reserves. The expected wind speed at Yala LGA is 10 km/h (6.2 mph).

== Economy ==
The people of Yala are historically and predominantly subsistence farmers and traders. They cultivate white yams, water yam, black yam and cassava as main crops for home consumption and sell the surplus in the village market. They also plant other crops like bambara nuts, groundnuts, sesame, maize and some local legumes, e.g. igigri.

Animal rearing is also mainly subsistence even though chicken and catfish farming are becoming increasingly important. Broilers and layers are in high demand. A few people rear native cows, which are smallish in size and prized for traditional celebrations and funerals.

A large number of Yala people are also involved in petty trading as well as running one shop supermarkets.

A major obstacle to economic activities for Yala people is the bad roads, both federal and state. The bad state of disrepair of the roads leads to fast depreciation of motorcycles, the main medium of transport. Dust from the roads causes respiratory illnesses and contaminated garri. Yet the people of Yala are resilient, carrying on their lives as best as they can.

== See also ==
Cross River State In Yala local government area, there is an ongoing construction of a rice industry, located on a land mass from between Okuku heading towards Igoli road through the Army Barracks. There is a roofing tiles factory in Yala. The Yala people are predominantly farmers, civil servants, and law enforcement officers. A significant number of the youths work as traders, craftsmen and commercial motorcyclists.

In Yala, the most celebrated agricultural produce is the yam. An entire day is declared as a holiday to celebrate the yam every new harvest time which is usually on the 30th of August annually. This sees Yala people from all around the world return home to enjoy a cultural heritage festival and Holiday.
