= Cross River State House of Assembly =

Legislative arm of a state government in Nigeria

The Cross River State House of Assembly is the legislative chamber of Cross River State in Nigeria. Elvert Ayambem is the current speaker of the 10th state assembly.

== History ==
In 2021, the legislative complex was renovated.

In May 2022, the assembly was occupied by protestors.

== Functions ==
The assembly has three main functions.

- Law Making
- Representative Function
- Deliberative Function
