= Bassey Ewa-Henshaw =

Nigerian politician

Senator of the Federal Republic of Nigeria from Cross River South Senatorial District
- In office May 2003 – May 2011
- Preceded by: Florence Ita Giwa
- Succeeded by: Bassey Otu
- Constituency: Cross River South

Personal details
- Born: 4 May 1943 (age 82)
- Party: People's Democratic Party (PDP)
- Profession: Entrepreneur, Politician

Bassey Ewa-Henshaw is a Nigerian politician who was elected Senator for the Cross River South constituency of Cross River State in 2003, and was reelected in 2007.

== Background ==
Bassey Ewa-Henshaw was born on 4 May 1943. He attended the Methodist Boys' High School, Oron, Akwa Ibom State, 1957 - 1961. He attended New York University (1968–1974), obtaining a B.Sc. and an M.Sc. in business. He worked at Chase Manhattan Bank and Citibank, and became the first indigenous managing director of Agbara Estates Limited in 1984. Other public positions before running for the senate included Director, Nigerian National Petroleum Corporation (NNPC), Ecobank Côte d'Ivoire and Council Member of the University of Ibadan.

== Senate career ==
Cross River governor Donald Duke backed Bassey Ewa Henshaw in the 2003 elections. Running as a People's Democratic Party (PDP) candidate, Bassey Ewa-Henshaw was elected as senator in the 5th (2003–2007) National Assembly representing Cross River South Senatorial District, and was reelected in April 2007. He serves on committees on Millennium Development Goals, Federal Character & Inter-Government Affairs, Federal Capital Territory, Employment, Labour & Productivity and Water Resources.

Before his election, in December 2002, Henshaw said of the onshore/offshore dichotomy bill that the president President Olusegun Obasanjo must have a genuine reason for refusing to sign the bill.

In October 2004 Bassey Ewa-Henshaw presented a report from the Senate Committee on Employment, Labour and Productivity, discussing possible strikes related to gasoline price hikes. He noted that imports were required because refineries were running below capacity due to power shortages and other factors, but even at full capacity refinery output would be 18 million litres daily while the national demand was for 30 million litres.

In June 2008, the Senate yesterday ordered another investigation into the cancellation of the Escravos GTL project in the Niger Delta due to escalating cost estimates. Henshaw supported the motion and advocated extending the probe to other gas projects, a proposal that was rejected.

In a mid-term assessment of Nigerian Senators published by the Thisday, the newspaper noted that Bassey Henshaw sponsored the Nigerian Investment Fund for Future Generation Bill 2008, Value Added Tax (Amendment) Bill 2008, Petroleum Act (Amendment) Bill 2008, Bureau of Public Enterprises Act (Amendment) Bill 2008 and Binding Resolution of the National Assembly Bill. He sponsored and co-sponsored a number of motions, especially during the Halliburton bribery scandal. The article described his contributions as incisive.
