= Odukpani =

- LGA and town
- Interactive map of Odukpani
- Country: Nigeria
- State: Cross River State

Government
  - Local Government Chairman: Hon ETIM UKPONG ASIDO
- Elevation: 126 m (413 ft)
- Time zone: UTC+1 (WAT)
- Website: www.crossriverhub.com.ng/odukpani

Odukpani is a town and local government area (LGA) in Cross River State, South-South Nigeria. It lies between latitude 5°4'52.46''N and longitude 8°20'59.7''E and has an elevation approximately 413 ft. It shares a boundary with Calabar (the state capital) and is largely populated by the Efik people.

President Olusegun Obasanjo announced in March 2006 that a 561 megawatt gas turbine power station was to be opened at Ikot Nyong in the LGA. In April 2008, the House Committee on Power and Steel was investigating the power station project, which was only 30% complete and eight months behind schedule, although the contractor had been fully paid.

Settlements in Odukpani include, Akpap Okoyong, Eki, Eniong Abatim, Ito, Idere, Ukwa Ibom, Creek Town, Inuakpa Okoyong, Okurikang. The LGA has approximately a population of 257,800 persons.

The paramount ruler of Odukpani local government area is His Royal Majesty, Etinyin Otu Asuquo Otu Mesembe VI.

== Climate ==
The climate of Odukpani is tropical humid with wet and dry seasons annual rainfall between 1,300–3,000 mm (51–118 in). These areas are characterized by high temperatures, rainfall, and humidity.

In Odukpani, the rainy months are generally warm with heavy cloud cover, while the dry months are hotter and still fairly cloudy. The area experiences consistently humid and uncomfortable conditions throughout the year. Temperatures usually fall between 21 °C (70 °F) and 32 °C (89 °F), hardly ever dropping under 18 °C (65 °F) or rising beyond 33 °C (92 °F).

== Geography and Economy ==
Odukpani LGA residents engage in farming as a significant aspect of their economic activity, with products including cucumber and pineapple cultivated in significant amounts there. Due to the abundance of seafood in the rivers and streams of Odukpani LGA, fishing is another favorite pastime among the locals. Other significant economic activities for the residents of Odukpani LGA include trading, logging, and artisan production.
