= Oban Hills =

Coordinates: 5.5°N 8.58333°E

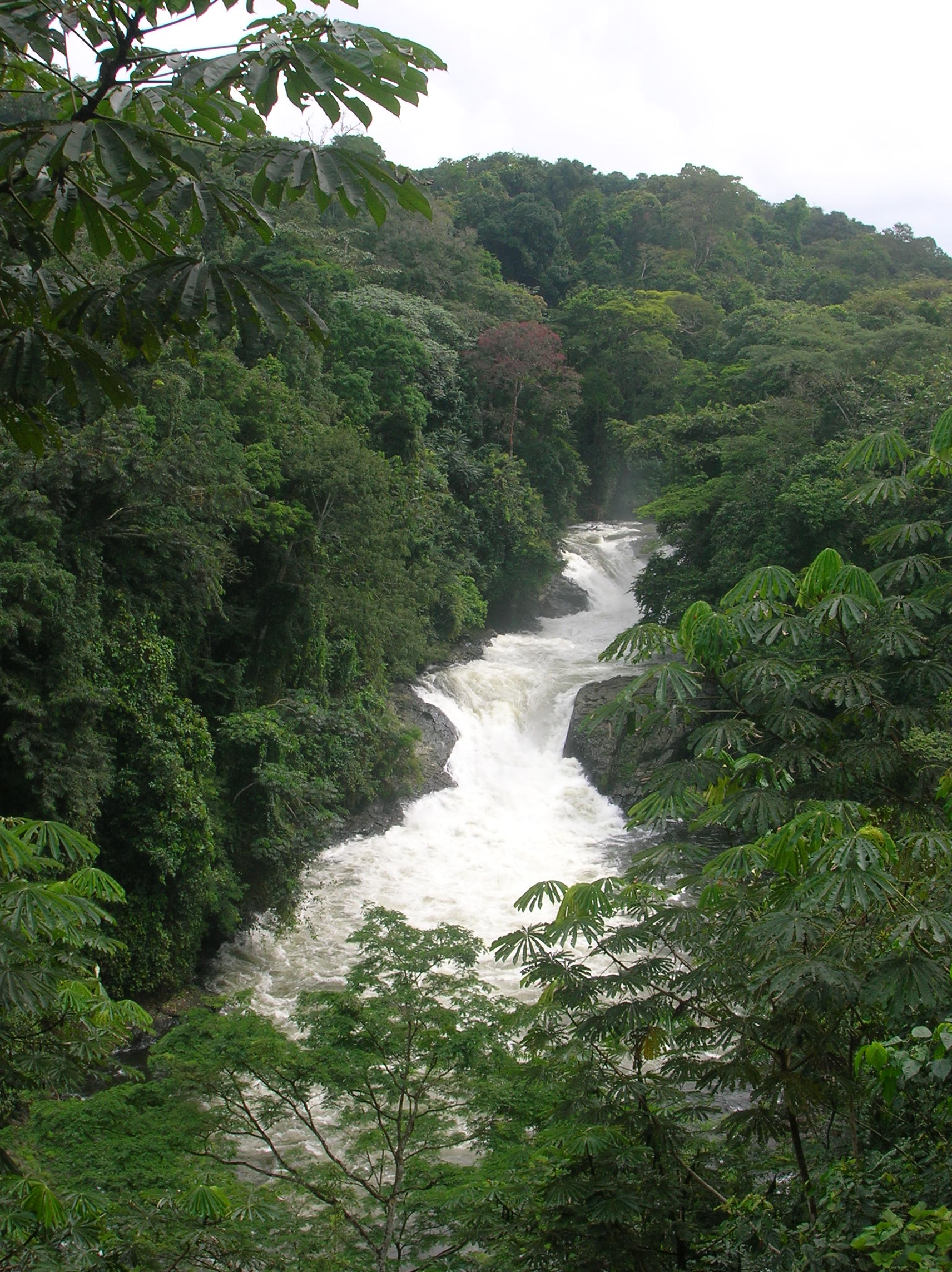
Kwa Falls, along the Great Kwa River in Cross River State, Nigeria

The Oban Hills are a range of hills in Cross River State, Nigeria. They lie within the Oban Hills Division of the Cross River National Park.

== Geography ==
The hills are rugged, rising from 100 metres (330 ft) in the river valleys to over 1,000 metres (3,300 ft) in the mountains. The soils are highly vulnerable to leaching and erosion where stripped of plant cover. The rainy season lasts from March to November, with annual rainfall of over 3,500 mm.

The northern part is drained by the Cross River and its tributaries. The southern parts are drained by the Calabar, Kwa and Korup rivers.

== Land use ==
The Oban hills, which take their name from the small town of Oban to the south, contain the largest area of unexploited lowland rain forest in Nigeria. It is possible that at one time the region was home to more people, perhaps being depopulated due to its proximity to the slave trading center of Calabar, and that the forest may actually be fairly recent growth. A 1988 report said that the remaining patches of forest on mountainous slopes were being encroached upon for logging and farming. Primates such as Preuss's guenon were being hunted for meat. The Oban Hills Forest Reserve was made a part of the Cross River National Park in 1991.

== Sources ==
- "Important Bird Areas factsheet: Cross River National Park: Oban Division". BirdLife International. 2010.
- Lee, Phyllis C. (1988). Threatened Primates of Africa: The Iucn Red Data Book. IUCN. p. 61. ISBN 2-88032-955-8.
- Oates, John F. (1999). Myth and reality in the rain forest: how conservation strategies are failing in West Africa. University of California Press. ISBN 0-520-22252-0.
