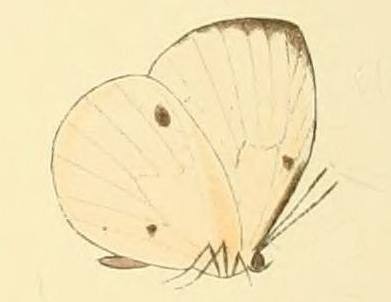

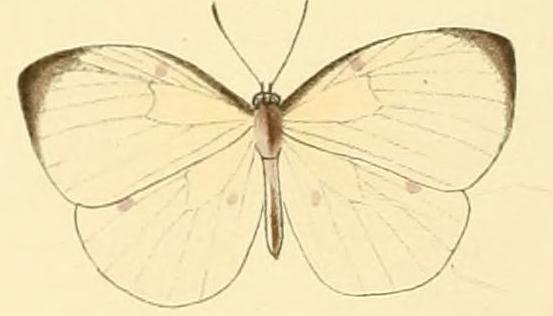

Scientific classification
- Kingdom: Animalia
- Phylum: Arthropoda
- Class: Insecta
- Order: Lepidoptera
- Family: Lycaenidae
- Genus: Larinopoda
- Species: L. lircaea

Binomial name
- Larinopoda lircaea (Hewitson, 1866)

Synonyms
- Larinopoda lycaenoides Butler, 1871; Larinopoda hermansi Aurivillius, 1896; Larinopoda spuma Druce, 1910; Larinopoda lircaea ab. alenica Strand, 1914; Larinopoda lircaea ab. alenicola Strand, 1914; Larinopoda lircaea ab. benitonis Strand, 1914; Larinopoda lircaea ab. makomensis Strand, 1914; Larinopoda lircaea ab. simekoa Strand, 1914; Larinopoda lircaea ab. bibundica Strand, 1914; Larynopoda lircaea var. innocentia Gaede, 1916

= Larinopoda lircaea =

Species of butterfly

Larinopoda lircaea, the cream pierid blue, is a butterfly in the family Lycaenidae. It is found in Nigeria (east and the Cross River loop), Cameroon, Equatorial Guinea, Gabon, the Republic of the Congo, the Central African Republic, Angola, the Democratic Republic of the Congo (Mayumbe, Mongala, Uele, Tshopo, Tshuapa and Kinshasa), Sudan and Uganda. The habitat consists of forests.

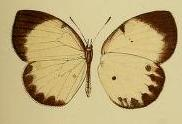

Adults are attracted to extrafloral nectaries.
