= Godwin Akwaji =

Nigerian politician

State Representative
- Succeeded by: Maria Godwin Akwaji
- Constituency: Obudu

Personal details
- Died: University of Calabar Teaching Hospital
- Spouse: Maria Godwin Akwaji
- Occupation: Politician

Godwin Akwaji (died June 2020) was a Nigerian politician and a former lawmaker representing Obudu constituency in the Cross River State House of Assembly. He died after displaying symptoms consistent with COVID-19. He died at the University of Calabar Teaching Hospital (UCTH). Following his death, his wife, Maria Godwin Akwaji, succeeded him as the representative for Obudu constituency.
