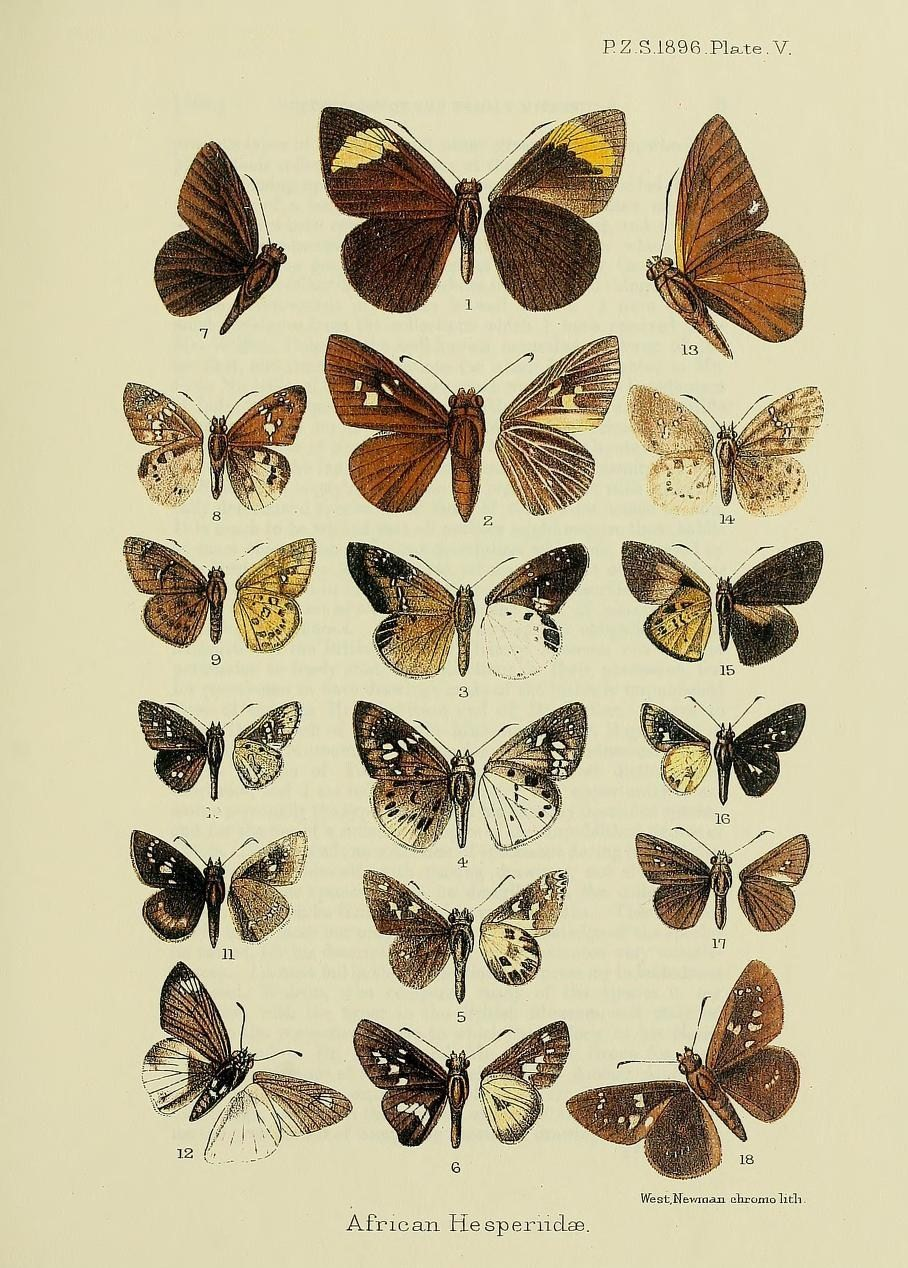
- figure 7

Scientific classification
- Kingdom: Animalia
- Phylum: Arthropoda
- Class: Insecta
- Order: Lepidoptera
- Family: Hesperiidae
- Genus: Ortholexis
- Species: O. melichroptera

Binomial name
- Ortholexis melichroptera Karsch, 1895

Synonyms
- List: Acallopistes dimidia Holland, 1896; Katreus dimidia (Holland, 1896); Loxolexis dimidia (Holland, 1896); Ortholexis dimidia (Holland, 1896)

= Ortholexis melichroptera =

Species of butterfly

Ortholexis melichroptera, the black scarce sprite, is a species of butterfly in the family Hesperiidae. It is found in Ghana, Nigeria (the Cross River Loop), Cameroon and Gabon. The habitat consists of dense primary forests.
