= Simon Nkoro =

Nigerian politician

State Representative
- Succeeded by: Stella Nkoro
- Constituency: Ikom II

Personal details
- Died: 2018 University of Calabar Teaching Hospital
- Spouse: Stella Nkoro
- Profession: Politician

Simon Nkoro Egbong was a Nigerian politician who represented the Ikom II State Constituency in the Cross River State House of Assembly. He died in 2018 after a prolonged illness, at the University of Calabar Teaching Hospital. Following his death, his wife, Stella Nkoro, succeeded him as the representative for Ikom II State Constituency.
