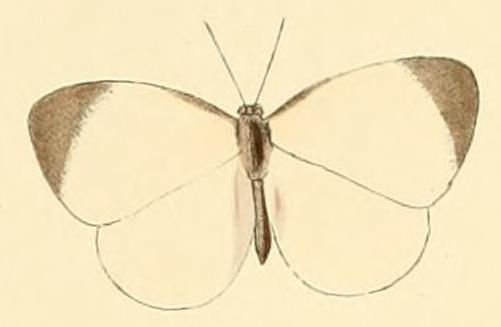

Scientific classification
- Kingdom: Animalia
- Phylum: Arthropoda
- Class: Insecta
- Order: Lepidoptera
- Family: Lycaenidae
- Genus: Larinopoda
- Species: L. lagyra

Binomial name
- Larinopoda lagyra (Hewitson, 1866)

Synonyms
- Liptena lagyra Hewitson, 1866; Larinopoda lara Staudinger, 1892; Larinopoda emilia Suffert, 1904; Larinopoda lagyra gyrala Suffert, 1904; Larinopoda emilia ab. punctata Druce, 1910; Larinopoda lagyra emilia ab. deficiens Dufrane, 1953

= Larinopoda lagyra =

Species of butterfly

Larinopoda lagyra, the white pierid blue, is a butterfly in the family Lycaenidae. It is found in Nigeria (the Cross River loop), Cameroon, Gabon, the Republic of the Congo, the Democratic Republic of the Congo and Uganda. The habitat consists of forests.

== Subspecies ==
- Larinopoda lagyra lagyra (south-eastern Nigeria, Cameroon, Gabon, Uganda: west to the Bwamba Valley, Democratic Republic of the Congo: Mongala, Uele, North Kivu, Tshuapa, Equateur and Sankuru)
- Larinopoda lagyra reducta Berger, 1981 (Democratic Republic of the Congo: Lualaba)
