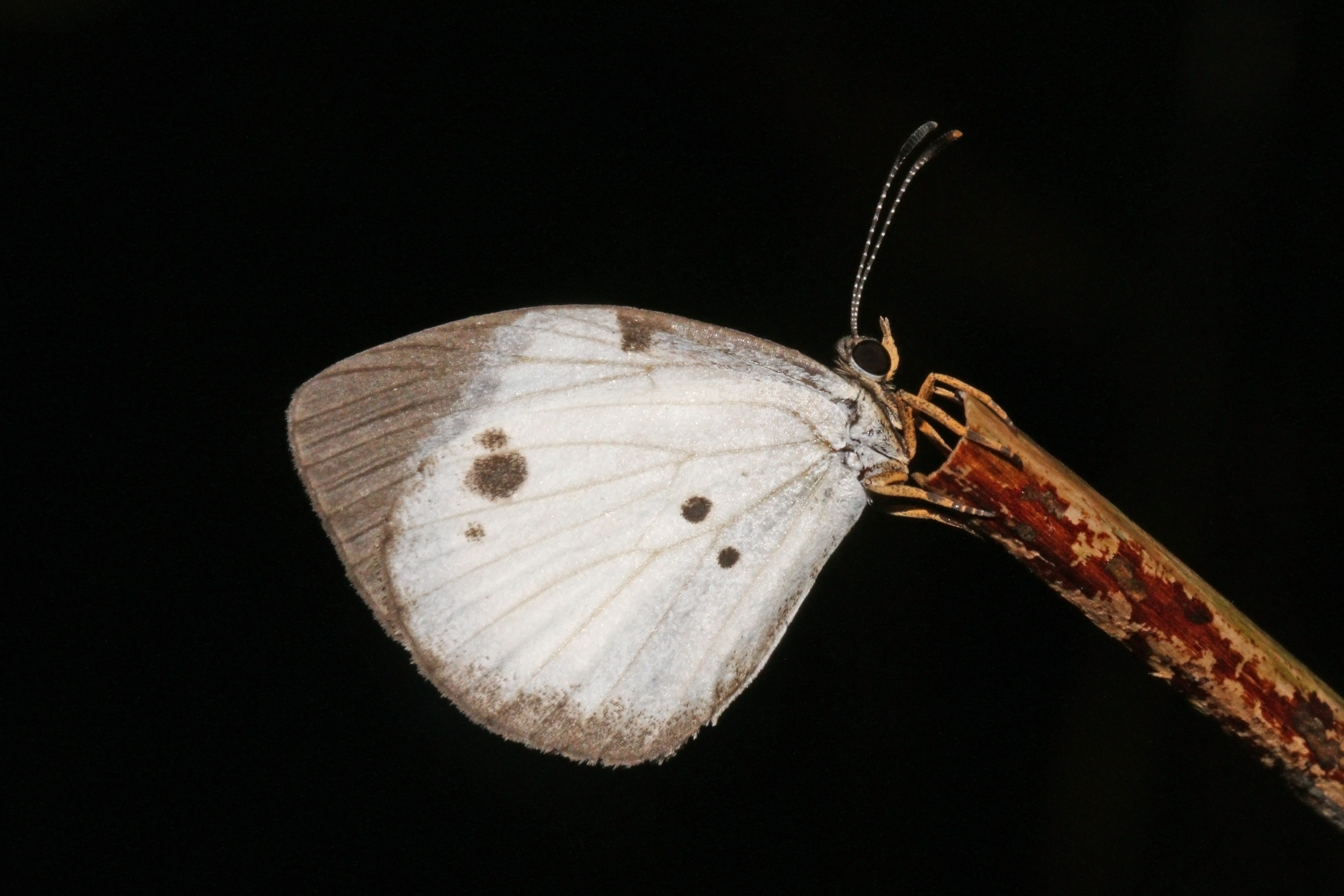
- Kakum National park, Ghana

Scientific classification
- Kingdom: Animalia
- Phylum: Arthropoda
- Clade: Pancrustacea
- Class: Insecta
- Order: Lepidoptera
- Family: Lycaenidae
- Genus: Larinopoda
- Species: L. eurema

Binomial name
- Larinopoda eurema (Plötz, 1880)

Synonyms
- Phytala eurema Plötz, 1880; Larinopoda varipes Kirby, 1887; Liptena libussa Staudinger, 1888

= Larinopoda eurema =

Species of butterfly

Larinopoda eurema, the western pierid blue, is a butterfly in the family Lycaenidae. It is found in Guinea, Sierra Leone, Liberia, Ivory Coast and Ghana. The habitat consists of forests.

Torben Larsen developed a species numbering system for his 2005 publication Butterflies of West Africa. This species is #265. The 'Larsen' numbers have since been used with permission in A Sharp Eye on Butterflies of Ghana.
