= Great Kwa River =

Waterfall in Cross River, Nigeria

Coordinates: 4.781903°N 8.398018°E

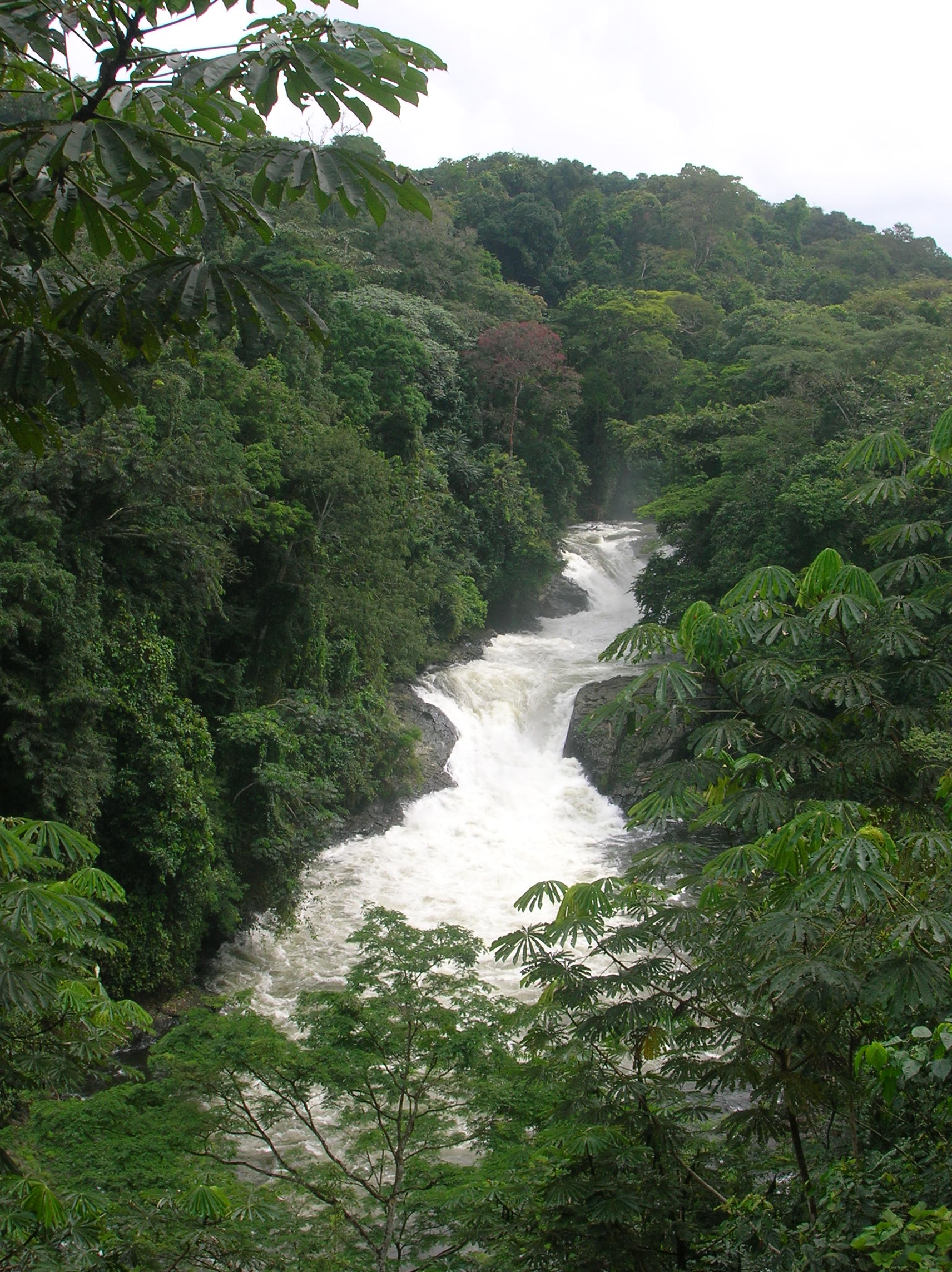
Kwa Falls in Cross River National Park

The Great Kwa River flows through Cross River State, Nigeria, draining the east side of the city of Calabar. The river ecology is under threat from human activity.

== Location ==
The river originates in the Oban Hills, in the Cross River National Park, and flows southwards to the Cross River estuary.

Its lower reaches are tidal, with broad mud flats, and drain the eastern coast of the city of Calabar.

== Human activity ==
Human activity in the Great Kwa basin has traditionally been limited to small scale farming, aquaculture and artisanal fisheries, mainly for shrimp. However, Calabar is growing, due in part to the Calabar Free Trade Zone, causing growing numbers of houses and factories to be built in the freshwater and mangrove swamps of the Great Kwa. The University of Calabar covers a 17-hectare (42-acre) site between the Great Kwa River and the Calabar River. The university has acquired more land on both banks of the Great Kwa for future development.

== Pollution ==
Calabar Municipality has no waste treatment facilities, and heavy rains wash human and industrial wastes into the river. A 2008 study of Vibrio bacteria in shellfish in the Great Kwa River estuary showed that the water was constantly faecally polluted, and the shellfish had high levels of infection. This posed a health risk for consumers, including a risk of cholera epidemics.
