= Maria Akwaji =

Nigerian politician

Maria Godwin Akwaji

State Representative

Commissioner
- Preceded by: Godwin Akwaji
- Constituency: Obudu

Personal details
- Born: Nigeria
- Spouse: Godwin Akwaji
- Occupation: Politician

Maria Godwin Akwaji is a Nigerian politician and a former member of the Cross River State House of Assembly, representing the Obudu State Constituency under the platform of the Peoples Democratic Party (PDP). She succeeded her late husband, Godwin Akwaji, who died in June 2020 due to complications from COVID-19.

In her election, Maria Akwaji won with a landslide victory, securing 32,166 votes. Her closest opponent, Dr. Godwin Agbor Adaje of the All Progressives Congress (APC), received 3,546 votes.
