= Stella Nkoro =

Nigerian politician

State Representative
- Preceded by: Simon Nkoro
- Constituency: Ikom II

Personal details
- Party: Peoples Democratic Party (PDP)
- Spouse: Simon Nkoro
- Occupation: Politician

Stella Nkoro is a Nigerian politician who served as the representative for the Ikom II State Constituency in the Cross River State House of Assembly. Following the death of her husband, Simon Nkoro, the seat became vacant, leading to a bye-election in 2018. Stella Nkoro was the sole candidate for the election, representing the Peoples Democratic Party (PDP), and was subsequently declared the winner in accordance with Section 41 of the 2010 Electoral Act (as amended). With her election, she became the second individual to fill her late husband's seat in the Cross River State House of Assembly.
