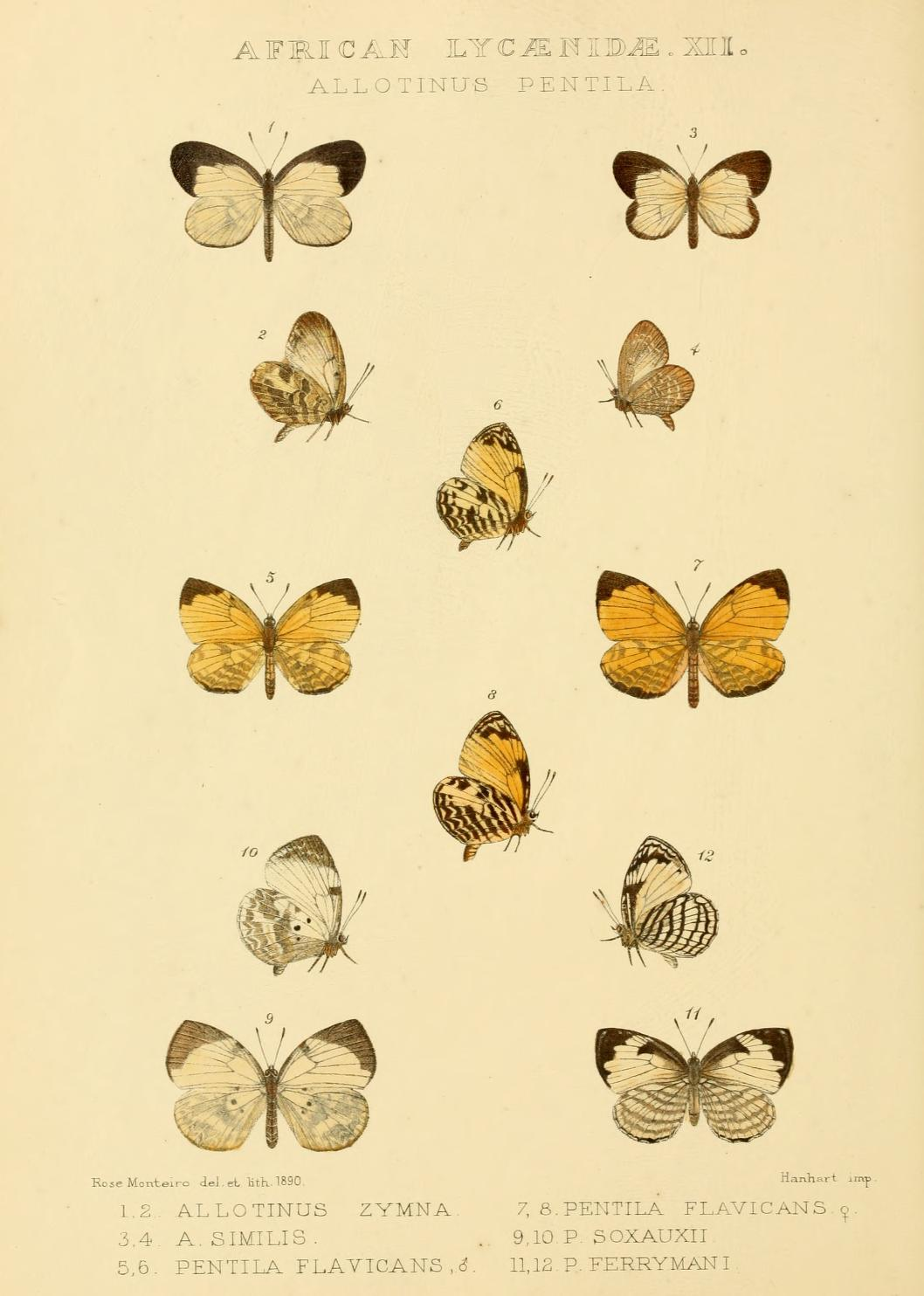

Scientific classification
- Kingdom: Animalia
- Phylum: Arthropoda
- Class: Insecta
- Order: Lepidoptera
- Family: Lycaenidae
- Genus: Larinopoda
- Species: L. tera

Binomial name
- Larinopoda tera (Hewitson, 1873)

Synonyms
- Liptena tera Hewitson, 1873; Liptena soyauxii Dewitz, 1879

= Larinopoda tera =

Species of butterfly

Larinopoda tera is a butterfly in the family Lycaenidae. It is found in Cameroon, Equatorial Guinea, Gabon, the Republic of the Congo, Angola, the Democratic Republic of the Congo (Uele, Ituri, Kivu, Tshuapa, Equateur, Sankuru and Lualaba), Uganda, western Kenya and western Tanzania. The habitat consists of primary lowland forests.

The larvae feed on lichens growing on tree trunks.
