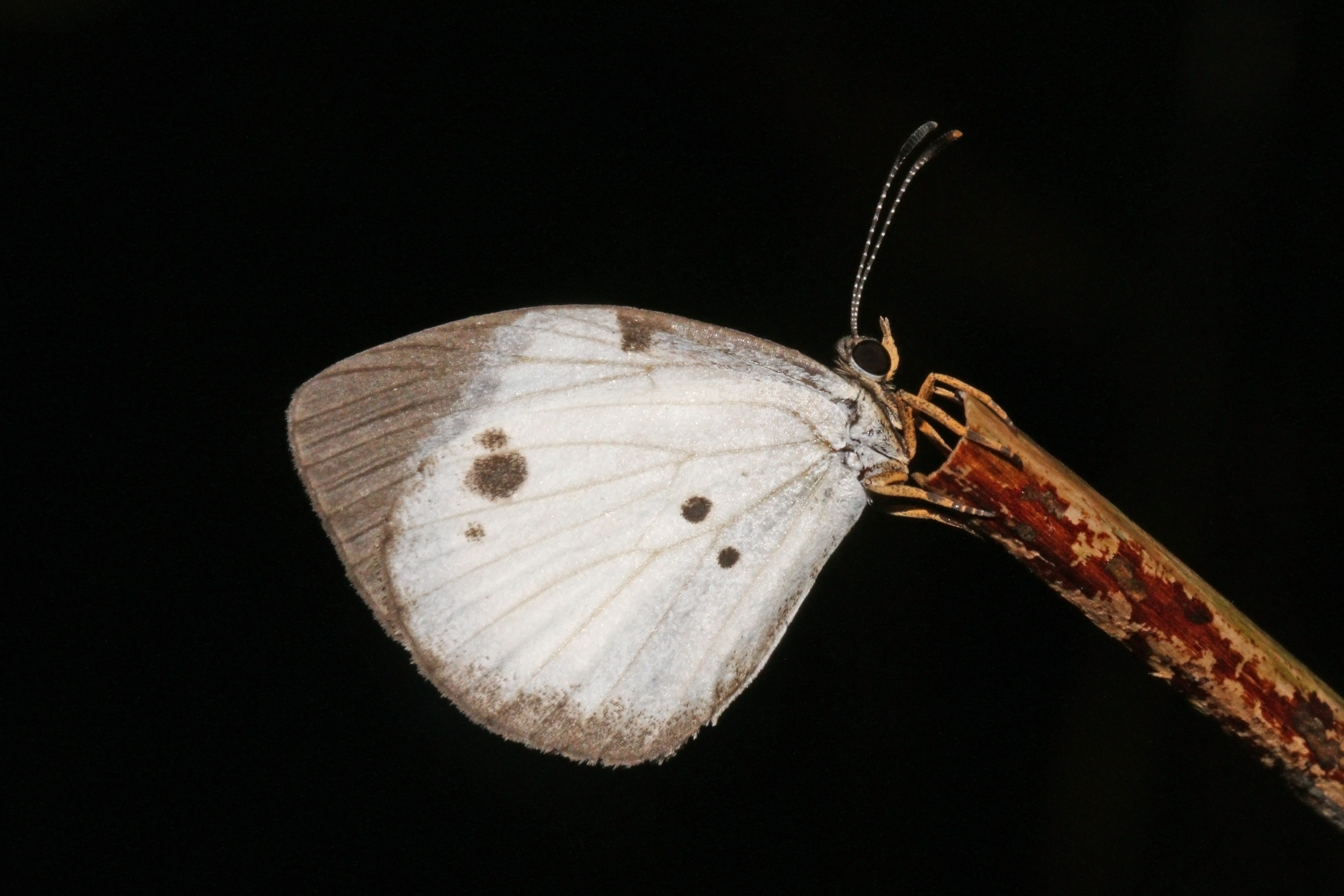
- Western pierid blue Larinopoda eurema

Scientific classification
- Domain: Eukaryota
- Kingdom: Animalia
- Phylum: Arthropoda
- Class: Insecta
- Order: Lepidoptera
- Family: Lycaenidae
- Genus: Larinopoda; Butler, 1871

= Larinopoda =

Butterfly genus in family Lycaenidae

Larinopoda is a genus of butterflies in the family Lycaenidae. The species of this genus are endemic to the Afrotropical realm.

== Species ==
- Larinopoda aspidos Druce, 1890
- Larinopoda batesi Bethune-Baker, 1926
- Larinopoda eurema (Plötz, 1880)
- Larinopoda lagyra (Hewitson, 1866)
- Larinopoda lircaea (Hewitson, 1866)
- Larinopoda tera (Hewitson, 1873)
