= Calabar =

Capital city of Cross River State, Nigeria

Calabar Kingdom of Calabar
- City
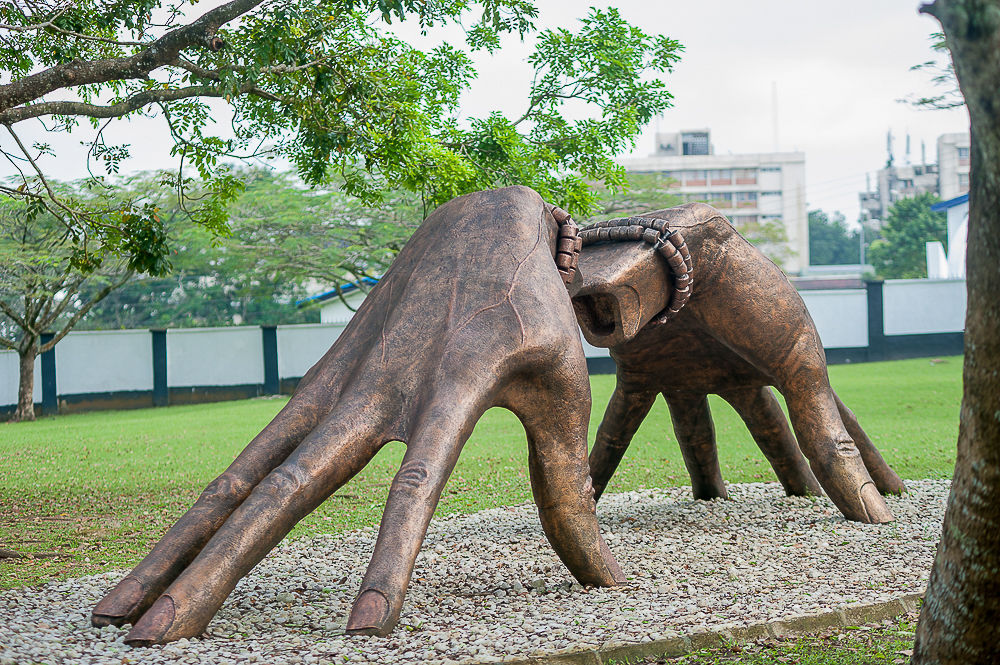
- Giant Hand Sculptures near National Museum, Calabar.

- Location in Nigeria Calabar (Africa)
- Coordinates: 04°58′36″N 08°20′18″E
- Country: Nigeria
- State: Cross River

Area
  - City: 406 km^{2} (157 sq mi)
- Elevation: 32 m (105 ft)

Population (2006)
  - City: 371,022
  - Estimate (2026): 310,845
  - Rank: 26th in Nigeria; 28th (Agglomeration)
  - Density: 914/km^{2} (2,370/sq mi)
  - Urban: 634,901(Calabar Municipal + Calabar South)
  - Metro: 683,791

GDP (PPP, 2015 int. Dollar)
  - Year: 2023
  - Total: $4.8 billion
  - Per capita: $7,300
- Time zone: UTC+1 (WAT)
- Climate: Am

Calabar(also referred to as Callabar, Calabari, Calbari, Cali and Kalabar) is the capital city of Cross River State, Nigeria. It was originally named Akwa Akpa, in the Efik language, as the Efik people dominate this area. The city is adjacent to the Calabar and Great Kwa rivers, and the creeks of the Cross River (from its inland delta).

Calabar was once described as the tourism capital of Nigeria, especially due to several initiatives implemented during the administration of Donald Duke as the Governor of Cross River State (1999–2007). The city became the cleanest and most environmentally friendly city in Nigeria.

Administratively, the city is divided into Calabar Municipal and Calabar South Local Government Areas. It has an area of 406 square kilometres (157 sq mi) and, as of the 2006 census, a population of 371,022. Both LGAs together had an estimated population of 571,500 in 2022.

== History ==
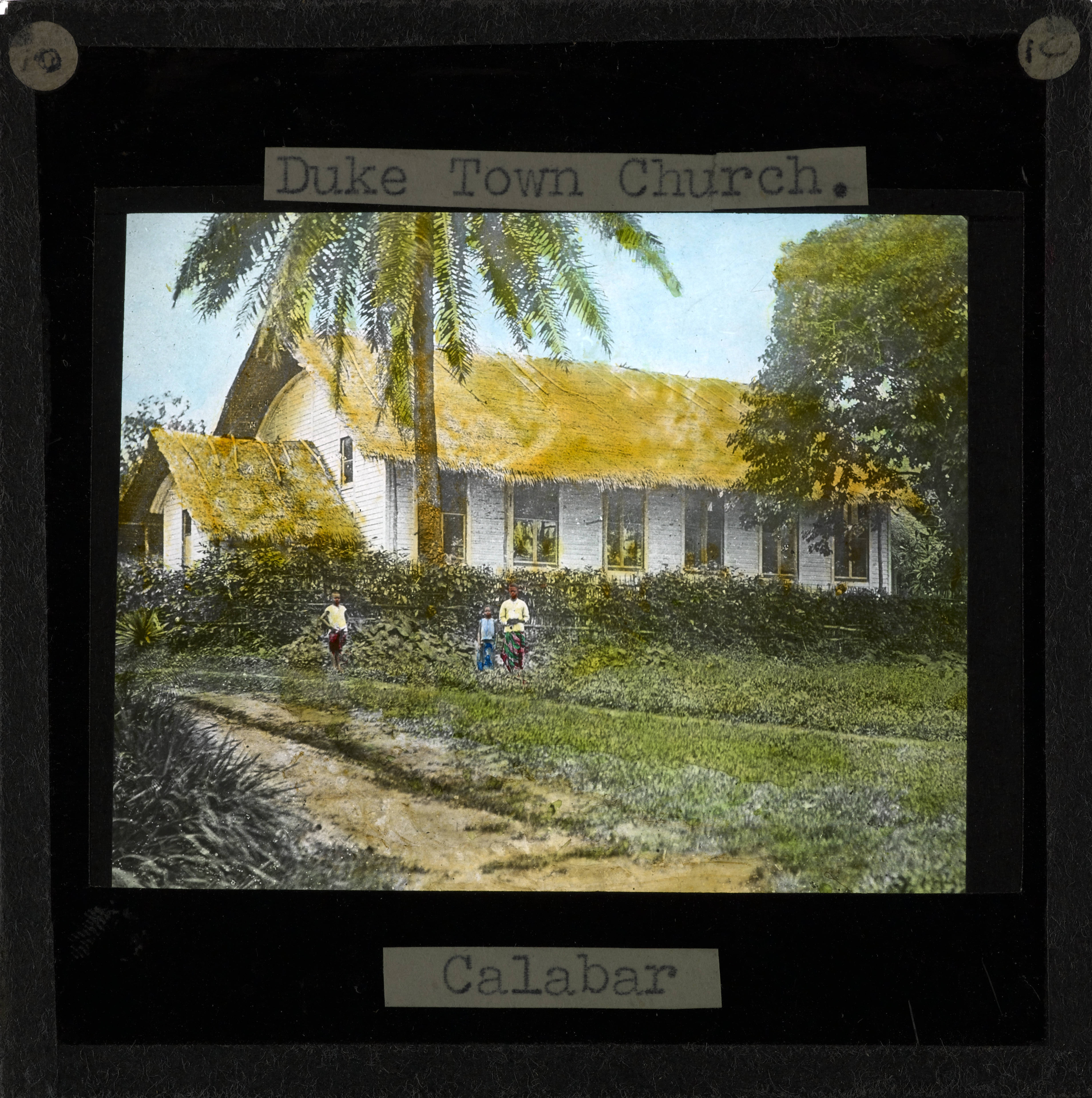
Duke Town Church, Calabar, late 19th century

=== Seaport, slave trade ===
When Portuguese explorers in the 15th century reached this part of the Guinea coast, they called the tribes of the area "Calabar". These historic inhabitants were Quas, Efuts, and Efiks. Efik people migrated from the area of the Niger River to the shores of Calabar. They were fleeing civil war with their kindred and the Ibibio people.

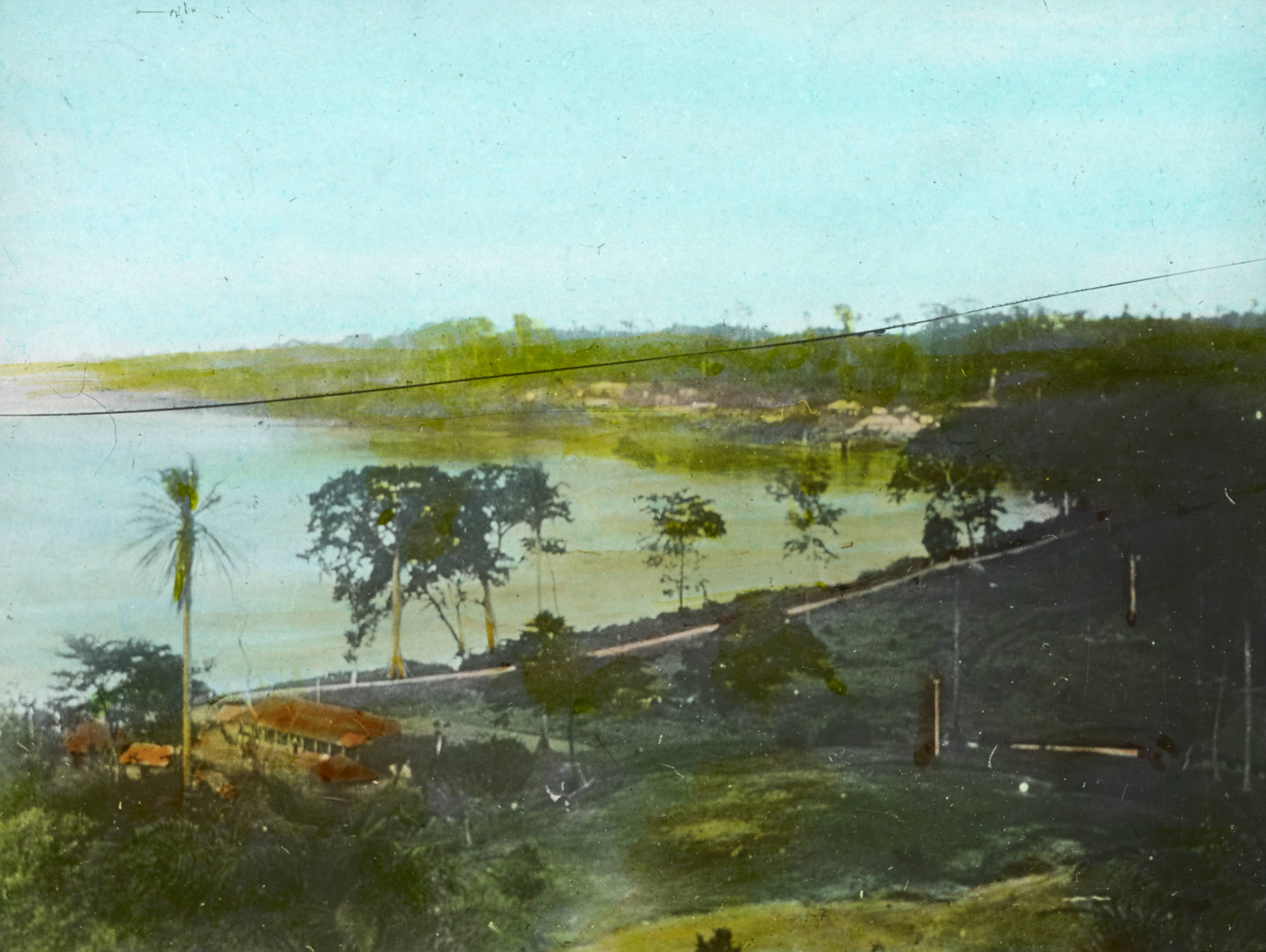
Site of Slave Market, Itu, Calabar, late 19th century

Since the 16th century, Calabar has served as an international seaport, exporting such goods as palm oil. During the centuries of the Atlantic slave trade, it became a major port for shipment of African slaves to the Americas. The Spanish maintain the Calabar designation.

Tribes around that region were taken in as slaves for slave trade. Such tribes included the Igbo tribes (communities) who lived around that region at the time. Those minority tribes were subject to slave raids by more powerful tribes or ethnic groups in the region.

From 1725 until 1750, roughly 17,000 enslaved Africans were sold from Calabar to European slave traders; from 1772 to 1775, the number soared to more than 62,000. Old Calabar (Duke Town) and Creek Town, 16 kilometres (10 mi) northeast, were crucial towns in the trade of slaves in that era.

In 1807, Great Britain abolished the slave trade. In 1815 HMS Comus, as part of the British blockade of Africa, sailed into Duke Town, where she captured seven Spanish and Portuguese slave ships.

John Jea, an enslaved African American, came from the area. He later became a writer. A small mulatto community of merchants was located here that had links to missionary and other merchant colonies in Igboland, Lagos, and across the Atlantic.

In 1846, Scottish Presbyterians established a mission station in Calabar. Among the missionaries, Hope Waddell, who worked in Calabar from 1845 to 1858, and Mary Slessor, who evangelized Christianity in Calabar from 1876 to 1915, worked to improve treatment by and among the native peoples. They influenced many Efik people to convert to Christianity.

They tried to change or abolish the following traditional practices:

- Killing newborn twins,
- Human sacrifice at the death of village elders (to provide servants for them in the afterlife),
- "Judgment of God", in which suspects in crime were poisoned, and convicted if they fell ill or died

They founded a school to provide secondary education to Africans. They also worked to protect water supplies and limit mosquitoes to contain yellow fever epidemics.

Waddell and Slessor are still honoured in Calabar today; streets and squares in the city were named for them.

=== Colonial times ===
On 10 September 1884, Queen Victoria signed a treaty of protection with the king and chiefs of Akwa Akpa, known to Europeans as Old Calabar—then the official title to distinguish it from New Calabar to the east. This enabled the United Kingdom to exercise control over the entire territory around Calabar, including Bakassi. Calabar was the headquarter of the European administration in the Niger Delta until 1906 when the seat of government was moved to Lagos.

Calabar developed earlier, albeit less vigorously than Lagos, with which it is sometimes compared because of some parallels. Calabar has the following achievements:

- First Nigerian city to have a secondary school (the Hope Waddell Training Institution),
- first Nigerian city with a hospital (St Margaret's),
- first Nigerian female pharmacist,
- first Nigerian female politician (Margaret Ekpo),
- first Nigerian librarian,
- first native professor (Eyo Ita),
- first Nigerian city with a post office,
- first Nigerian town with a barracks,
- first Nigerian city with a network of paved roads,
- first Nigerian city with a botanical garden (now derelict),
- first Nigerian city with a monorail (now also derelict),
- "Nigeria's cleanest city"

From 1914 until the 1960s, a mail steamer of the Liverpool Elder-Dempster Line called at Calabar every month. In addition to letters and parcels, it also delivered newspapers, and cargo and carried up to 100 passengers to Lagos, Port Harcourt and Calabar.

In 1922, British governor Clifford established the Legislative Council. The four elected members were from Lagos (3) and Calabar (1). The Legislative Council enacted laws for the colony and the protectorate of Southern Nigeria. It also approved the annual budget for the entire country. The four elected members were the first Africans to be elected to a parliamentary body in British West Africa.

The Clifford Constitution led to the formation of political parties in Nigeria. Herbert Macaulay, a newspaper owner and grandson of Samuel Ajayi Crowther, in 1923 founded the first Nigerian political party, the Nigeria National Democratic Party. It remained the strongest party in the elections until 1939.

In 1926, Governor Graeme Thomson attempted to introduce a poll tax in southeast Nigeria, including Calabar. It would reduce the number of Africans eligible to vote in elections. The people reacted with strong protests, which Nigerians call the "Women's War", for many of its leaders, and the British termed the "Aba Riots". These riots spread from the neighbouring town of Aba to Calabar. Several administrative buildings were destroyed and more than 50 women died at the hands of colonial forces.

=== Biafra War ===
After independence in 1960, tensions increased between the North and South areas of the country, which were strongly affiliated with Muslims and Christians, respectively. In addition, the South had a concentration of educated people who were politically powerful and had a history of trade and interaction with other communities.

The Southeastern area decided to become independent and declared itself as the Republic of Biafra in 1967. It included Calabar. In October 1967, an armada of the Nigerian Navy left the harbour of Bonny on a naval campaign en route to Calabar. The ships carried troops of the Nigerian 3rd Naval Division under the command of Colonel Benjamin Adekunle. At this time, Calabar was being defended by the 9th Battalion of Biafrans under the command of Major Ogbo Oji. On 17 October, the Biafran defences on the beaches of Calabar came under heavy air and naval fire. Less than 24 hours later, the Nigerian 8th Battalion under the command of Major Ochefu went ashore at Lokoja and captured the Calabar cement factory.

Later that day, the Nigerian 33rd Battalion landed on the beach at Calabar. The Biafran resistance was overwhelmed. After Nigerian troops advanced into Calabar from three different positions, bloody hand-to-hand fighting ensued. After suffering heavy losses, the remaining mercenaries retreated northward and fled Biafra. After three years, the country reunited under the Nigerian central government.

== Economy ==
Today's economy of the megacity of Calabar is dominated by:

- The local administration as the state capital of Cross River,
- The centrally located naval base (Nigeria's navy is the strongest in West and Central Africa),
- the harbour (see below),
- the airport (see below) and
- the free trade zone.

The state government of Cross River is trying to stimulate tourism in Calabar. The initiation of the Calabar Carnival in 2004 by the then Governor Donald Duke is probably the most successful measure to advance tourism in Calabar.

== Transport ==
=== Margaret Ekpo Airport ===
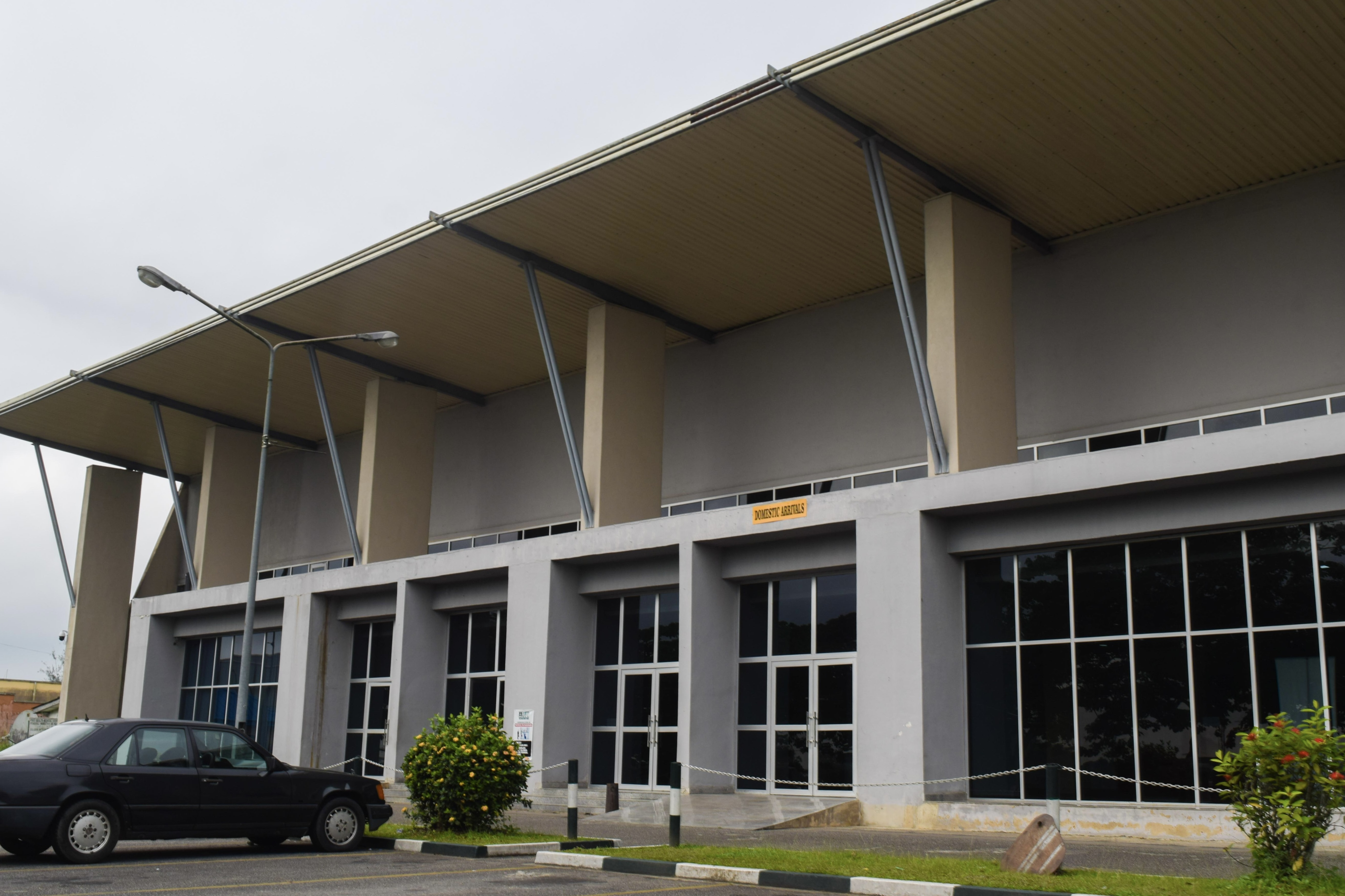
Margaret Ekpo International Airport

Margaret Ekpo International Airport was inaugurated in 1983 by then-President Shagari. Lufthansa, British Airways and KLM/Air France fly to the airport from Calabar with a stopover in Lagos or Abuja (the last leg of the flight is operated by the regional airlines Air Peace, Ibom Air and Aero Contractors).

=== The Old Harbour and the New Harbour ===
The Calabar Port Complex consists of the Old Port, the New Port and the Dockyard and is responsible for the petroleum terminals at Antan, Odudu, Yoho and QuaIboe as well as other jetties at NIWA, McIver, NNPC, ALSCON, Dozzy and Northwest. The three terminals at the Port of Calabar are operated by "world-class terminal operators, namely: ECM Terminal Ltd, INTELS Nigeria Ltd and Shoreline Logistics Nigeria Limited", according to the port operating company NPA.

The port of Calabar's profile in the oil and gas industry is fast gaining traction as the business is to capitalise on import and export opportunities by providing an efficient port service system that guarantees fast turnaround time of vessels and faster cargo clearance.

Calabar is a multi-purpose facility. The harbour consists of 2 terminals, A and B, and 2 smaller berths in the "Old Harbour" area. It has a channel draught of 7.5 metres. The terminals are operated by private operators under concession agreements. Terminal B, which occupies 80% of the harbour area, is operated under a concession by ECM Terminals Ltd; Intels LTD and Addak are the other terminal operators.

== Tourist attractions ==
Calabar sees itself as the "tourism capital of Nigeria". This is supported by the state government.

=== Museums ===
==== Slave History Museum ====
One of the five main themes of the museum is the Esuk Mba slave market in Akpabuyo. The slave trade in Calabar was based on slave raiding and trading, which mainly took place in the hinterland, where the enslaved were mostly prisoners of war. The prisoners of war were collected at this market and sold as slaves to slave traders.

Another exhibition shows objects from the slave trade, including chains and shackles. The traders used these to prevent resistance while transporting as many people as possible over long distances.

One exhibition shows the various means of payment used in the slave trade, from copper bars, manillas and Danish guns to brass bells, gongs, flutes and more. The arrangement of the slaves on a ship is artistically illustrated. The slaves were arranged in different positions depending on where they were accommodated on the ship, either sitting, standing or side by side. These positions were maintained until the ships reached their destination in the New World - a crossing that could take several months.

Finally, another exhibition traces the efforts of abolitionists such as William Wilberforce, Thomas Clarkson and Granville Sharp, who saw the slave trade as morally reprehensible and a matter of natural rights. They therefore put forward twelve proposals for abolition. A British Act for the Abolition of the Slave Trade of 25 March 1807 finally stipulated that the slave trade should be abolished by law from 1 May 1807.

The Daily Trust Nigeria reported the museum's decline. However, the negative report could be due to the COVID wave that was rampant at the time.

==== National Museum resp. Old Residency Museum ====
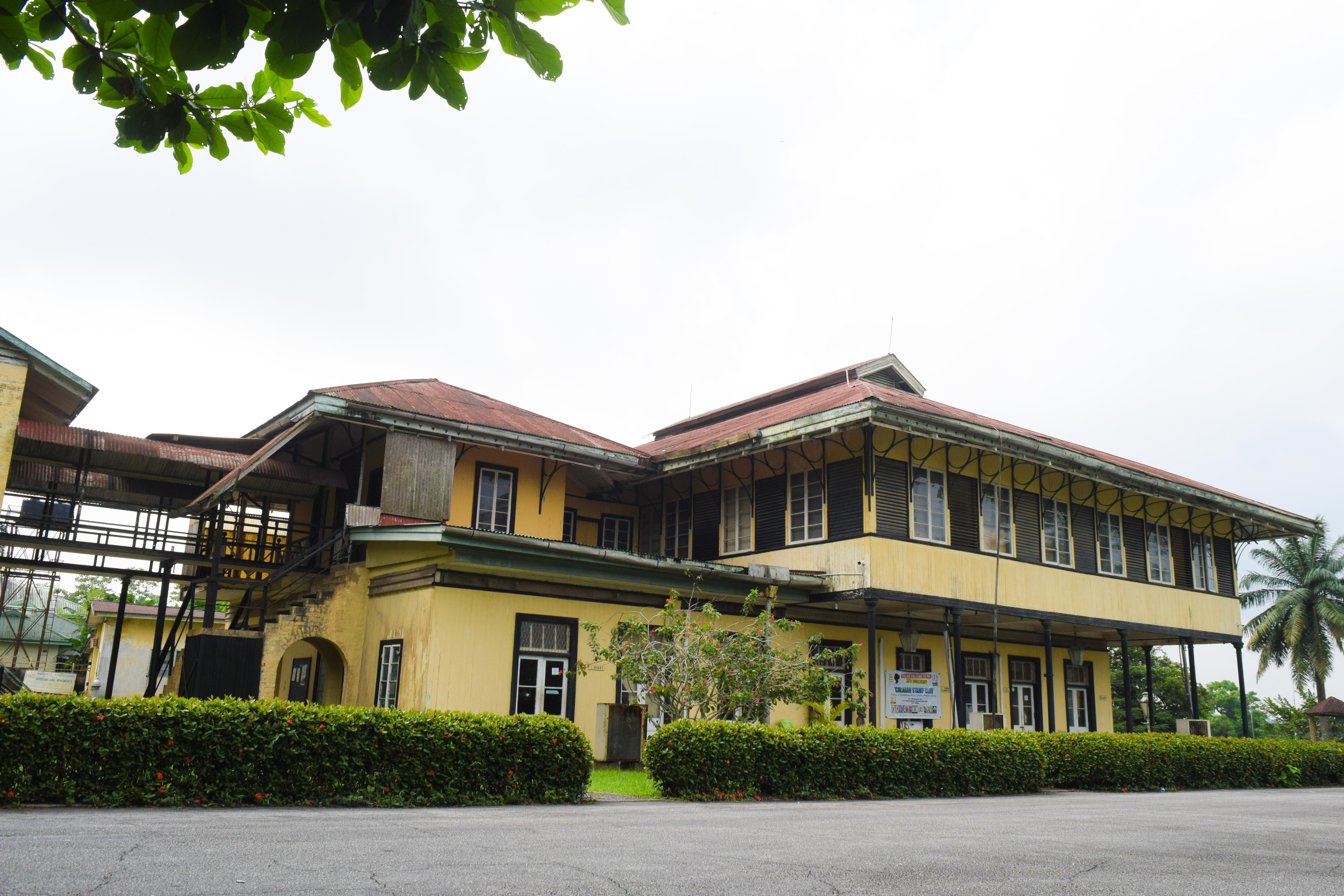
National Museum Calabar

The National Museum of Calabar was flat packed, shipped from Britain and built-in 1884 (it is sometimes incorrectly stated to have been built in 1959). It was formerly the government building or the governor's residence during colonial rule, which was built in Britain and then shipped in parts to Calabar. The Calabar National Museum is made of old Scandinavian pine and has preserved centuries-old relics, especially documents, furnishings and artefacts from the colonial era. The museum houses the relics of the slave trade, including the names of the people who supported the slave trade and the currency of the slave trade. The Calabar National Museum, designed and built by the colonisers in Glasgow, houses souvenirs from the slave trade. In 1959, the building became a national monument.

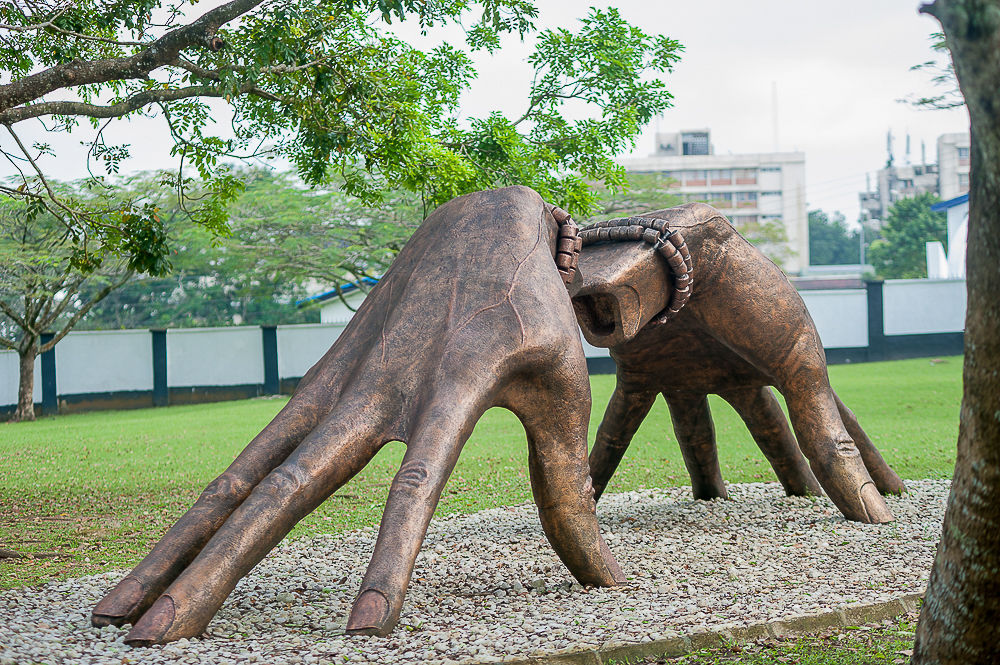
The Calabar hand sculpture

The National Museum was once the home of a British governor. It is located in Calabar, Cross River State, and displays unique artefacts and historical heritage.

On a tour of the museum, you can see the furnishings used by Europeans during the slave trade and colonial period. You can also see the constitutions in their original documents, which are kept in a large library.

Calabar's most impressive monument is located in the park of the National Museum. It depicts two chained hands.

==== Mary Slessor's House ====
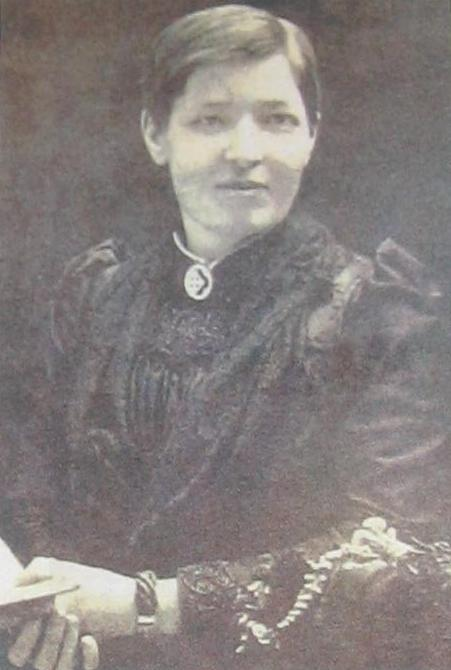
Mary Slessor

Mary Mitchell Slessor was a Scottish missionary sent to Nigeria by the United Presbyterian Church in the 19th century. Mary Slessor's House, built around 1880 in Akpap Village, Calabar, Cross River State, is one of the monuments dedicated to her memory.

Originally, the house was a mud house with two bedrooms, a verandah, a shop and a parlour. She referred to it as a "trailer", but the locals called it a "good pass all". In 1889, Mr Owens, a carpenter at the mission, was hired to build a more permanent structure for her. The walls were made of iron plates with wooden doors and windows.

When Southern Nigeria became a British protectorate, Miss Slessor acted as a female magistrate and skilful diplomatic ambassador. For her efforts in Okoyong, she was given the Efik name Obongawan Okoyong (Queen of Okoyong).

She was also instrumental in the establishment of the Hope Waddell Training Institute in Calabar, which provided vocational training for Efiks. Miss Slessor is widely regarded as a heroine in Nigerian history, and the Mary Slessor House stands as a historical site in honour of the missionary in Ekenge, Calabar, Cross River State.

=== Parks & resorts ===
==== Millennium Park ====
Millennium Park in Calabar is an amusement park and garden. It is a major tourist destination.

==== Tortuga Island ====
Located within the Calabar Marina Resort, Tortuga Island is an area with three popular plantation-style bars.

=== The Drill Rehabilitation Centre ===
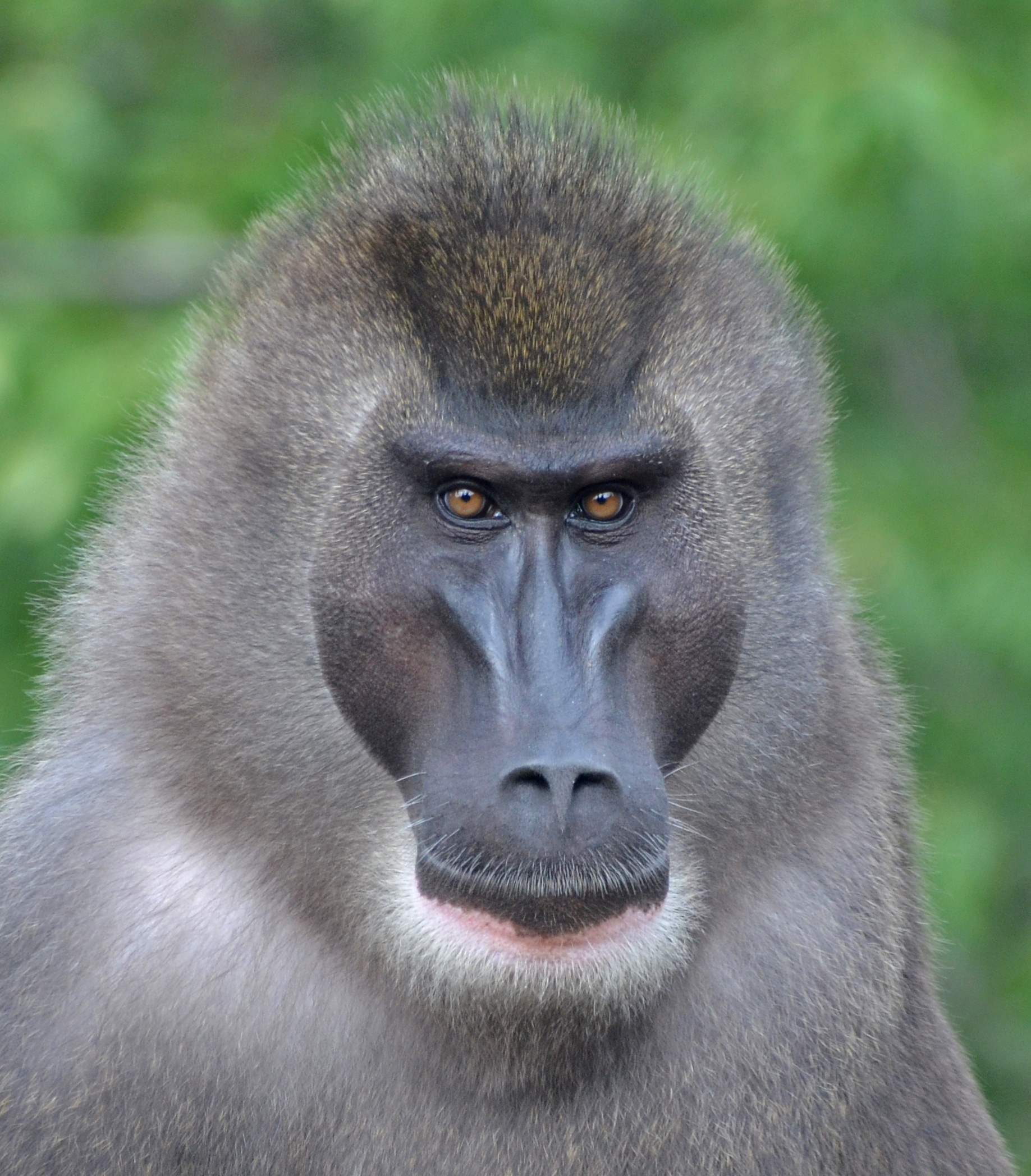
Drill

The Drill Rehabilitation Centre nature reserve was founded in 1991 and is the first rehabilitation project for primates in the region. Drills orphaned by hunting are donated by local citizens or handed over after confiscation by the authorities; no animals are bought or taken from the wild. More than 75 drills have been rescued and reunited with conspecifics after a thorough medical examination. Drills have reproduced poorly in western zoos, but the DRBC has recorded over 250 births from rehabilitated wild-born parents and their offspring, making the project the world's most successful captive breeding programme for an endangered primate. Today, 286 drills live in 6 family groups, each in their own natural habitat in an electrified enclosure of up to 9 hectares. There are plans to release the first group back into the wild. The Drill Ranch is also home to 28 orphaned chimpanzees. As the closest relatives of humans, chimpanzees contribute greatly to the education of visitors by arousing interest and sympathy for the animal world. The project has two locations. The original site in Calabar, the capital of Cross River State, is where it all began. Today, the "Drill Ranch Calabar" serves as the project's headquarters, office, quarantine centre for new animals and veterinary practice, as well as accommodation for the managers and rotating volunteer staff. One of the project's 6 drill breeding groups is also located here so that anyone living in or visiting the state capital has the opportunity to see drills. This group now comprises 39 animals in 4 generations, including the first drill. Drill Ranch Calabar is also home to a chimpanzee nursery - the project's youngest chimpanzees live here, where they receive round-the-clock care and supervision before moving to Afi Ranch at the age of 6-8 years.

=== In the vicinity ===
Not far from Calabar, you can visit the Kwa Waterfalls (approx. 15 km away), Ibeno Beach (30 km away) and the Cross River National Park. These three attractions are the most popular in Calabar on tourism websites.

==== Kwa Falls ====
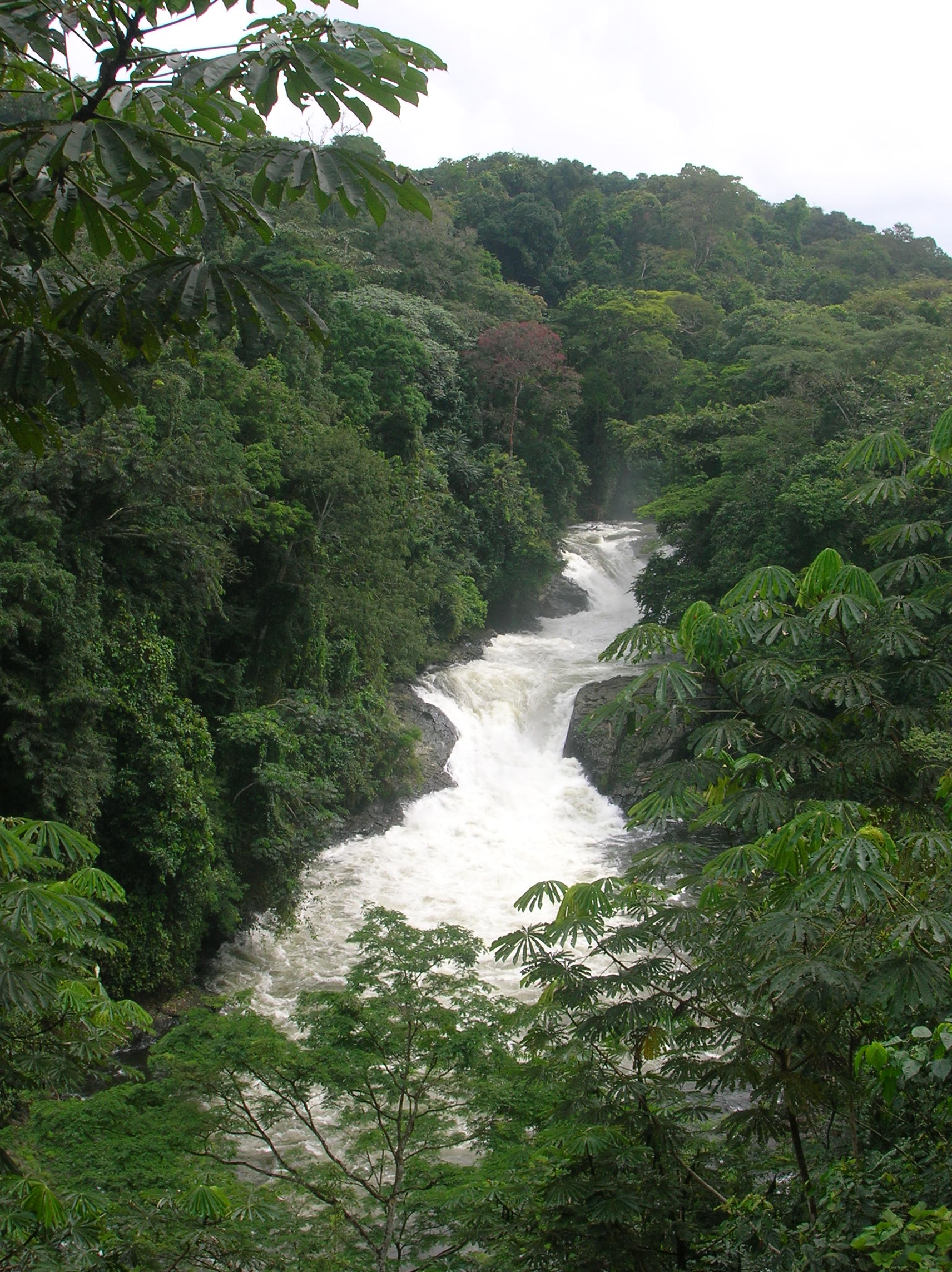
The Kwa Falls

The Kwa Falls are characterised by a narrow, steep gorge from top to bottom. The water forms a pool used for swimming and various water sports.

==== Cross River National Park ====
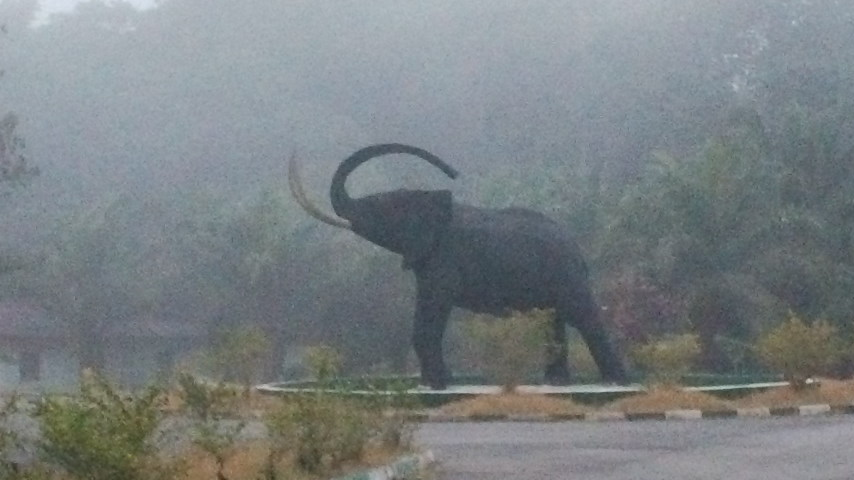
Cross River National Park

Cross River National Park is located northeast of Calabar and borders Cameroon. The Nigerian federal government is courting investors to develop the potential of ecotourism in this and other national parks. The park's motto is "The Pride Of Nigeria". The Kanyang Tourist Village, about an hour's drive from Calabar, will provide visitors with a base from which to visit the park and will have a lodge, restaurant and wildlife museum. Activities include game viewing, bird watching, gorilla tracking, mountain climbing or hiking, sport fishing, boat cruises and the Botanical Gardens and Herbarium at Butatong.

Attractions include the Kwa Falls (see above). The Agbokim Falls on the Cross River plunge over a cliff into the tropical rainforest in about 7 steps. There is a small zoological garden with animal species that are rare in Nigeria, which has helped to save some rare species from extinction.

== Festivals ==
=== Carnival in December ===
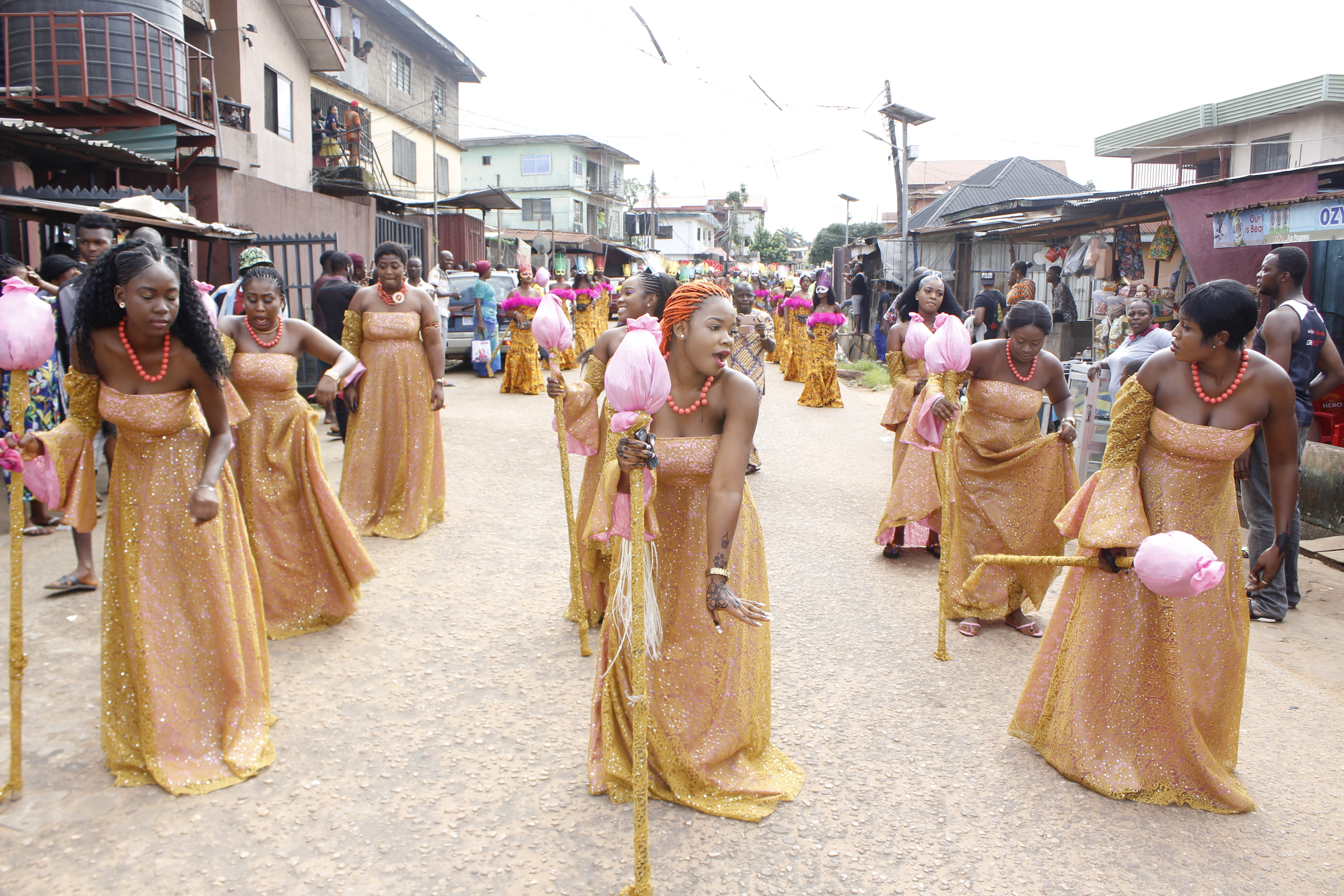
Calabar Group

The Calabar Carnival, for which the old harbour town is famous, takes place every December. The participating dance schools and imaginative costumes are obviously inspired by Brazil, although the samba is replaced by Afrobeats.

The Calabar Carnival lasts for the entire month of December and is divided into

- the Carnival of (African) Traditions,
- the children's carnival,
- the main carnival and
- the motorbike carnival (Bikers Carnival).

== Naval base ==
As Nigeria's income is almost exclusively derived from oil and its resources must be protected for national reasons, the Nigerian government has always relied on a strong navy. Nigeria's navy is the most powerful in West and Central Africa.

The Nigerian Eastern Naval Command is based in Calabar and includes, among others:

- NNS VICTORY, an operational base in Calabar and
- the Fleet Support Group (East) in Calabar.

A naval air base is planned for Calabar.

The Eastern Naval Command (ENC) is the second operational command of the Nigerian Navy and covers the sea area from Delta State to the Nigerian-Cameroonian border and from the Nigerian coast to the border of the Nigerian EEZ (Exclusive Economic Zone).

== Education ==
=== University ===
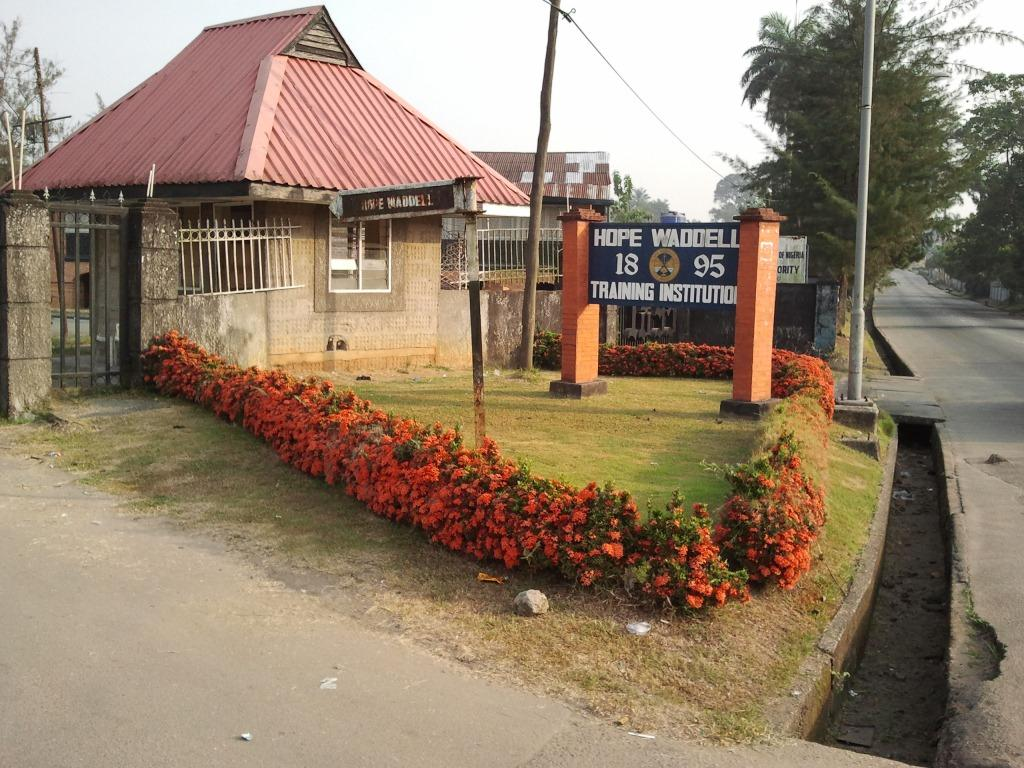
The Hope Waddell Training Institution

University of Calabar (Uncial) is considered "one of the best in the country".

University Of Cross River State (Unicross) is the state's University.

=== Cadet School ===
The Nigerian Navy maintains a cadet school in Calabar. It is a new model school, Nigerian Navy Secondary School, situated in Akpabuyo, about 10 minutes' drive from the airport. This new school complements the existing Nigerian Navy Primary School and Naval Officers Wives Association Primary School, both situated at Ikot Ansa Calabar.

=== High school with tradition ===
Founded in 1895, the Hope Waddell Training Institution was renovated after a long period of neglect and is once again functioning as a high school. Nigeria's first president Azikiwe received his secondary school leaving certificate here.

== Hospitals ==
Among the best hospitals (according to various lists on the Internet) are the University of Calabar Teaching Hospital and the Federal Psychiatric Hospital. The former took over the facilities of the former St Margaret's Hospital in 1979, which had been founded in 1897 as the first public hospital in Nigeria. The facilities of the maternity centre of St. Margaret's Hospital were also taken over by the hospital.

The Nigerian Navy maintains a naval hospital in Calabar, the Nigerian Navy Reference Hospital. The Nigerian Navy Reference Hospital claims to be "one of the best military health facilities in Nigeria. It emphasises the importance the Nigerian Navy places on providing excellent healthcare to members of the armed forces and society at large."

== Climate ==
Under Köppen's climate classification, Calabar features a tropical monsoon climate (Am) amidst a lengthy wet season spanning nine months and a short dry season covering the remaining three months. The harmattan, which significantly influences weather in West Africa, is noticeably less pronounced in the city. Temperatures are relatively constant throughout the year, with average high temperatures usually ranging from 25 to 28 °C or 77 to 82 °F. There is also little variance between daytime and nighttime temperatures, as temperatures at night are typically only a few degrees lower than the daytime high temperature. Calabar averages just over 3,000 millimetres (120 in) of rainfall annually. It is most windy in August.

Climate data for Calabar (1991–2020)
| Month | Jan | Feb | Mar | Apr | May | Jun | Jul | Aug | Sep | Oct | Nov | Dec | Year |
|---|---|---|---|---|---|---|---|---|---|---|---|---|---|
| Record high °C (°F) | 33.9 (93.0) | 36.1 (97.0) | 37.2 (99.0) | 35.0 (95.0) | 33.9 (93.0) | 32.8 (91.0) | 31.7 (89.1) | 31.7 (89.1) | 31.7 (89.1) | 32.2 (90.0) | 32.8 (91.0) | 33.3 (91.9) | 37.2 (99.0) |
| Mean daily maximum °C (°F) | 32.5 (90.5) | 33.7 (92.7) | 32.6 (90.7) | 31.9 (89.4) | 31.4 (88.5) | 30.0 (86.0) | 28.6 (83.5) | 28.1 (82.6) | 29.1 (84.4) | 30.1 (86.2) | 31.1 (88.0) | 32.1 (89.8) | 30.9 (87.6) |
| Mean daily minimum °C (°F) | 22.8 (73.0) | 23.9 (75.0) | 24.0 (75.2) | 23.7 (74.7) | 23.5 (74.3) | 23.1 (73.6) | 22.7 (72.9) | 22.8 (73.0) | 22.9 (73.2) | 22.9 (73.2) | 23.2 (73.8) | 22.9 (73.2) | 23.2 (73.8) |
| Record low °C (°F) | 16.7 (62.1) | 16.7 (62.1) | 20.0 (68.0) | 20.6 (69.1) | 20.0 (68.0) | 20.0 (68.0) | 19.4 (66.9) | 18.9 (66.0) | 20.0 (68.0) | 19.4 (66.9) | 19.4 (66.9) | 17.7 (63.9) | 16.7 (62.1) |
| Average rainfall mm (inches) | 32.0 (1.26) | 62.7 (2.47) | 178.5 (7.03) | 229.6 (9.04) | 308.6 (12.15) | 382.1 (15.04) | 490.3 (19.30) | 456.3 (17.96) | 392.1 (15.44) | 292.8 (11.53) | 171.3 (6.74) | 26.6 (1.05) | 3,022.8 (119.01) |
| Average rainy days (≥ 1.0 mm) | 1.9 | 4.1 | 10.1 | 12.5 | 16.3 | 18.4 | 23.2 | 22.5 | 20.9 | 18.3 | 10.3 | 1.8 | 160.3 |
| Average relative humidity (%) | 77.9 | 80.8 | 86.2 | 88.1 | 89.2 | 90.6 | 90.9 | 90.8 | 91.2 | 90.8 | 87.8 | 80.3 | 87.1 |
| Mean monthly sunshine hours | 167.4 | 146.9 | 108.5 | 135.0 | 136.4 | 129.0 | 55.8 | 49.6 | 60.0 | 105.4 | 135.0 | 176.7 | 1,405.7 |
| Mean daily sunshine hours | 5.4 | 5.2 | 3.5 | 4.5 | 4.4 | 4.3 | 1.8 | 1.6 | 2.0 | 3.4 | 4.5 | 5.7 | 3.9 |
Source 1: NOAA
Source 2: Deutscher Wetterdienst (sun 1958-1964)

== Political authority ==
The Efik kingdom patriarch is known as the Obong of Efik, and the ruler resides in Calabar. Other related nations, include the Qua Kingdom of Ejagham (Ekoi)/Bantu origin, and the Efut Kingdom. The Qua Kingdom has the Ndidem of the Qua nation as the Grand Patriarch, and the Efut have the Muri munene as the Grand Patriarch.

=== Traditional authority of Calabar ===
Before the colonial period, Calabar, originally known as Akwa Akpa, was a kingdom with the City of Calabar as the site of government. Calabar has three different monarchs, the Obong of Calabar as the ruler of the Efiks and the Ekpe secret society as the stool on which the Obong of Calabar sat. The Ndidem of Calabar is the ruler of the Quas and the paramount ruler of Calabar Municipality. The muri munene of the Efuts who is the ruler of the Efuts and paramount ruler of Calabar South.

== Calabar people ==
Calabar people are mainly the Indigenous people of the Old Calabar Province – which are Calabar South, Calabar Municipal, Akpabuyo, Bakassi, Biase, Odukpani and Akamkpa. However in Nigeria, the term "Calabar people" has also been colloquially used to refer to all the people from Cross River State.

== Gallery ==
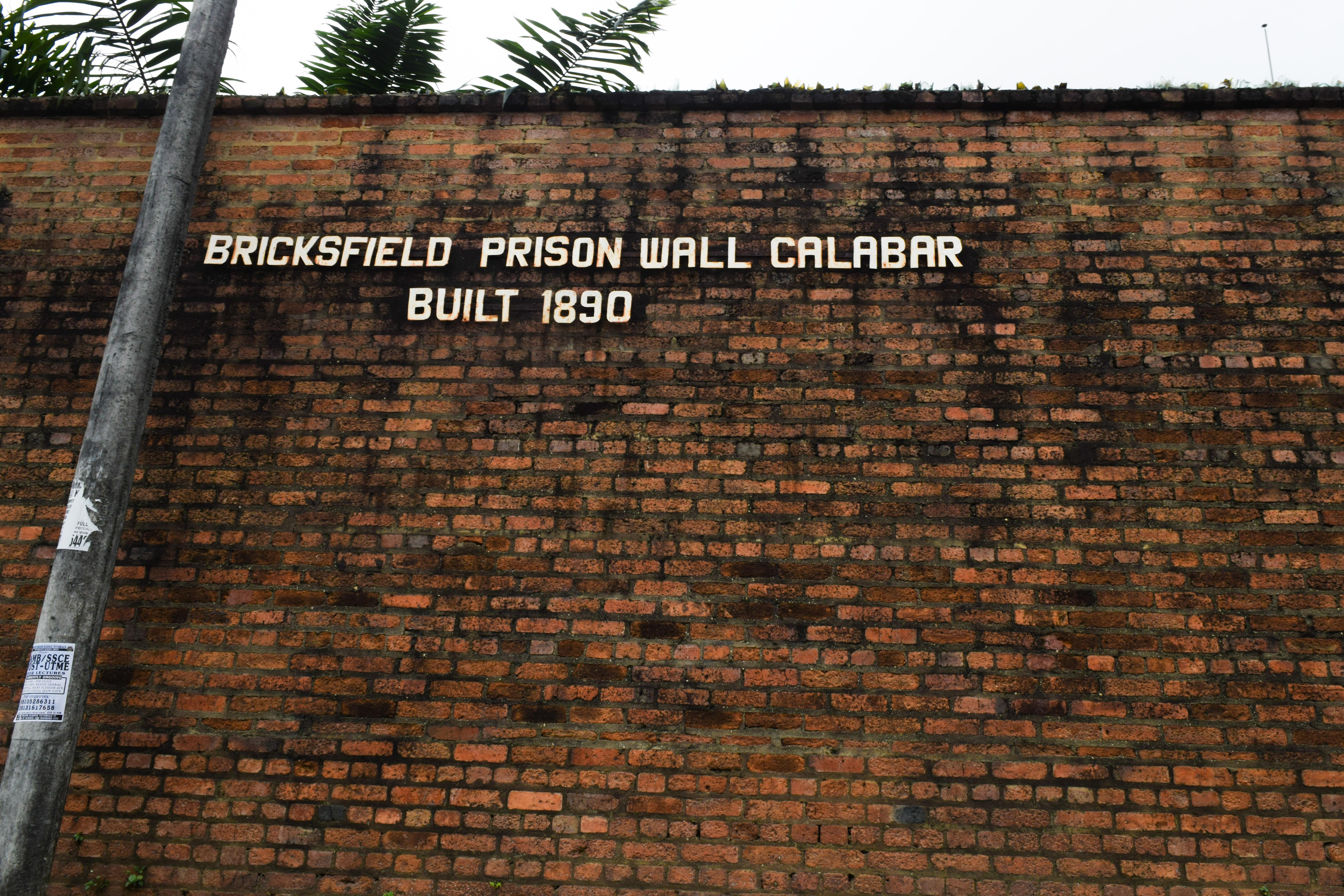

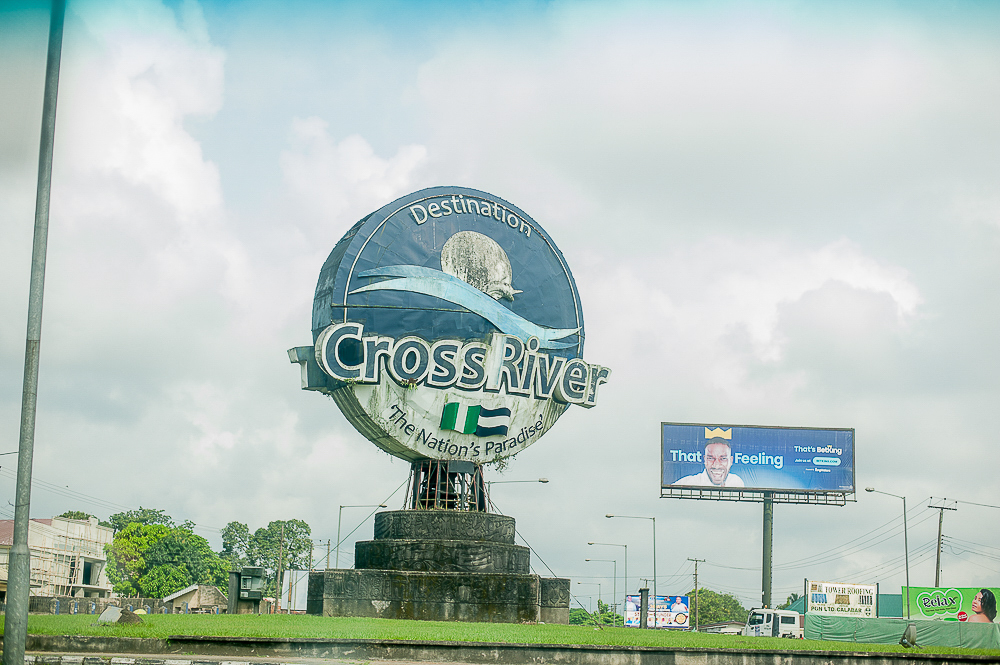

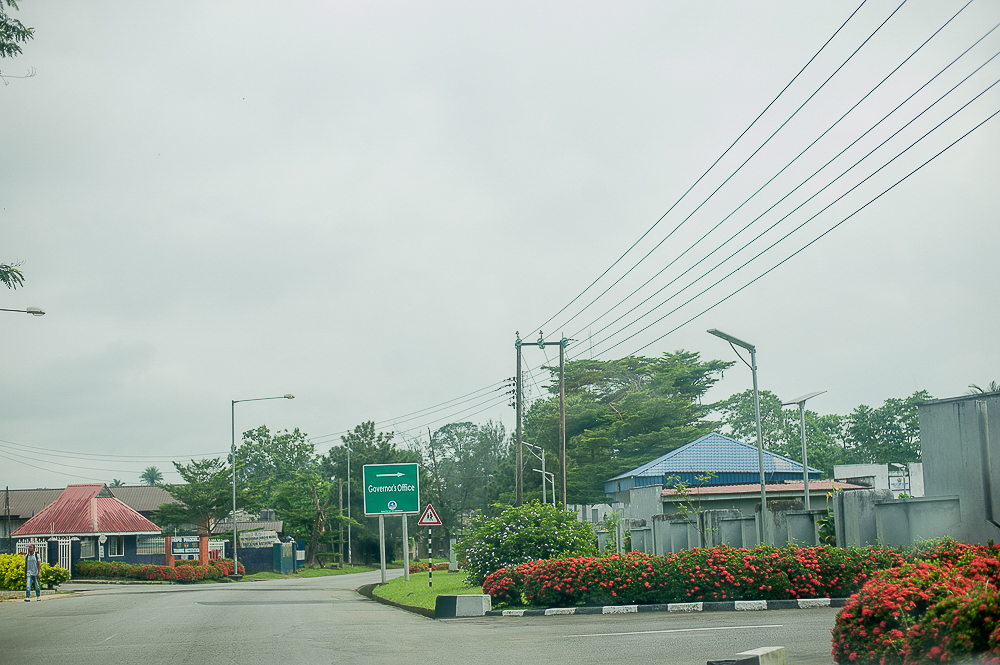

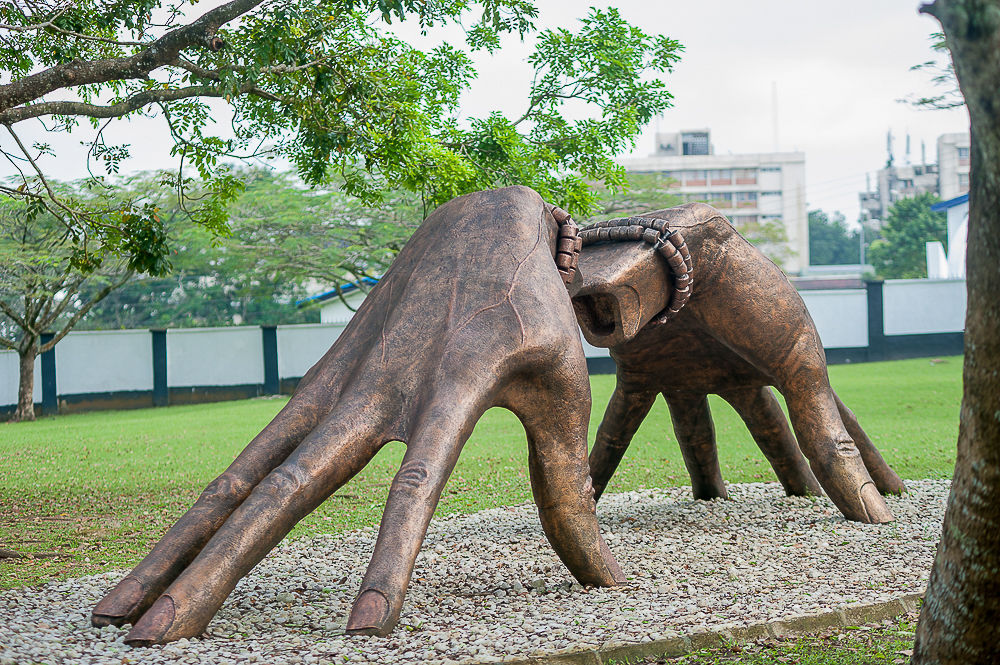

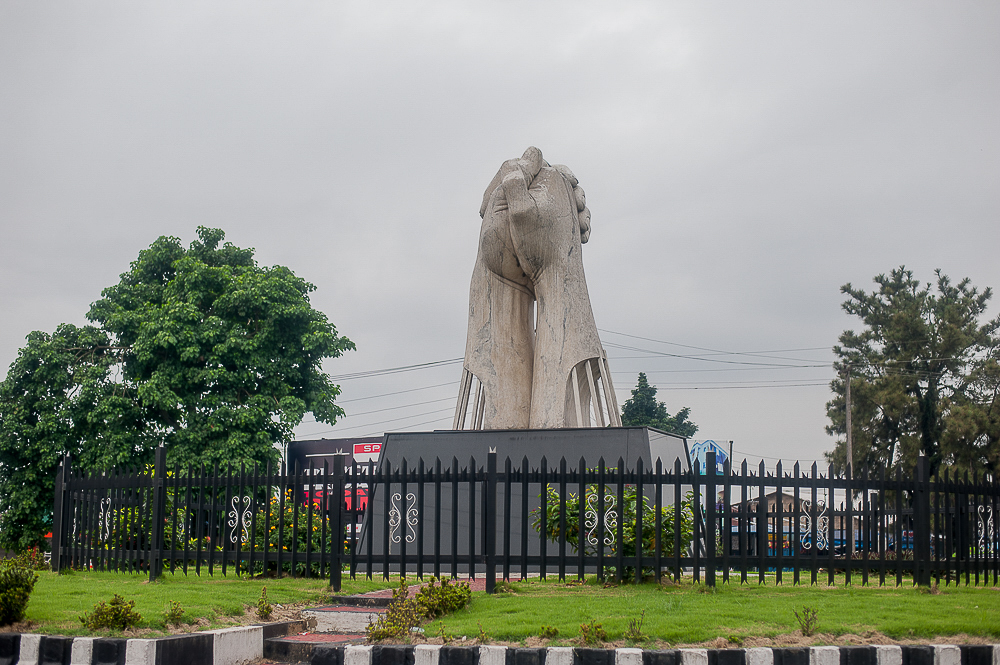

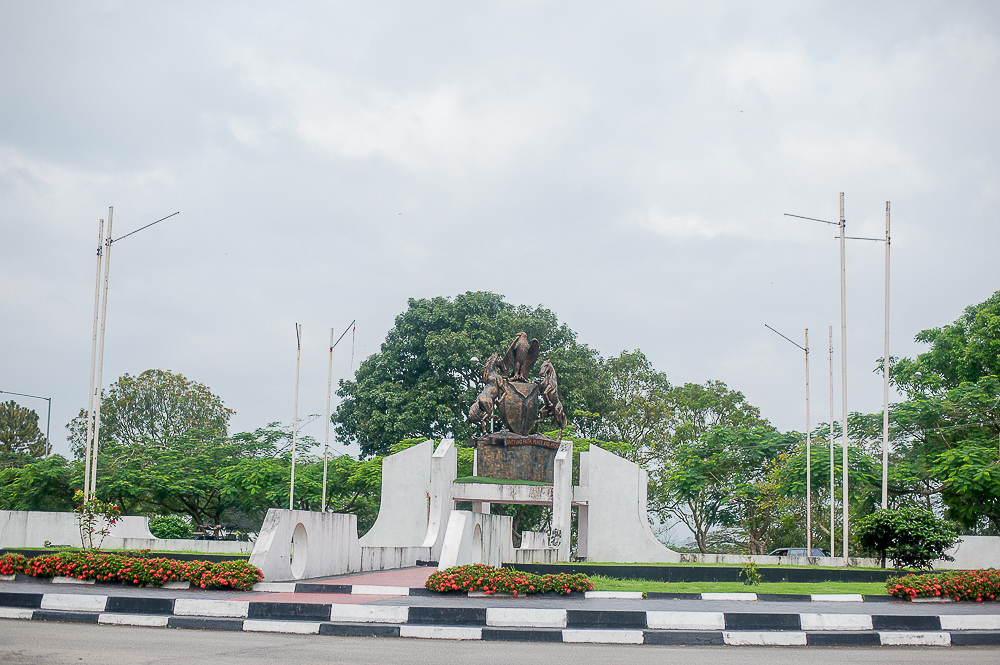

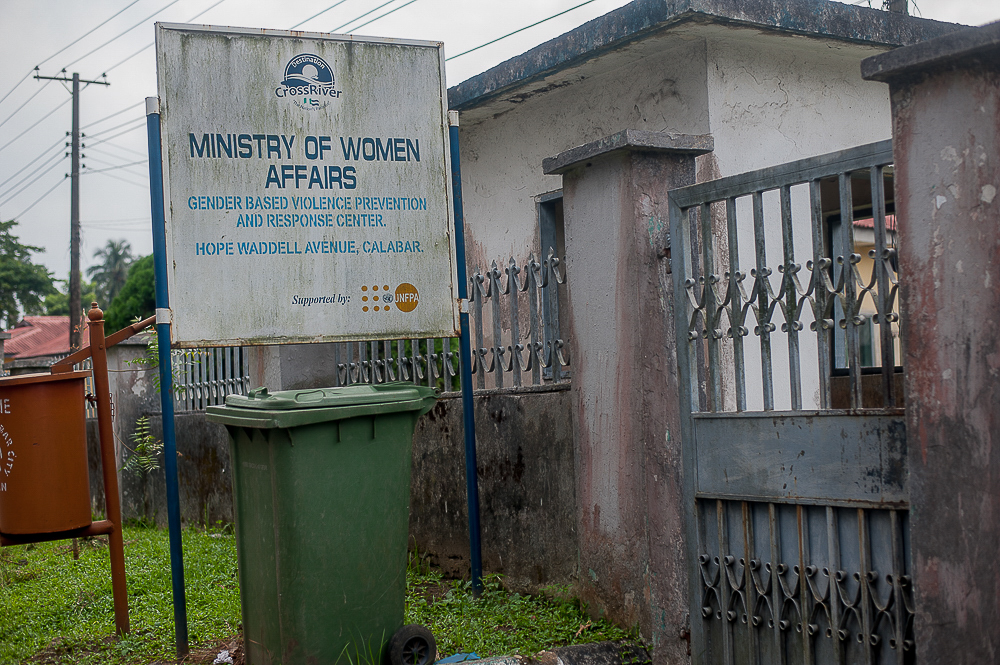

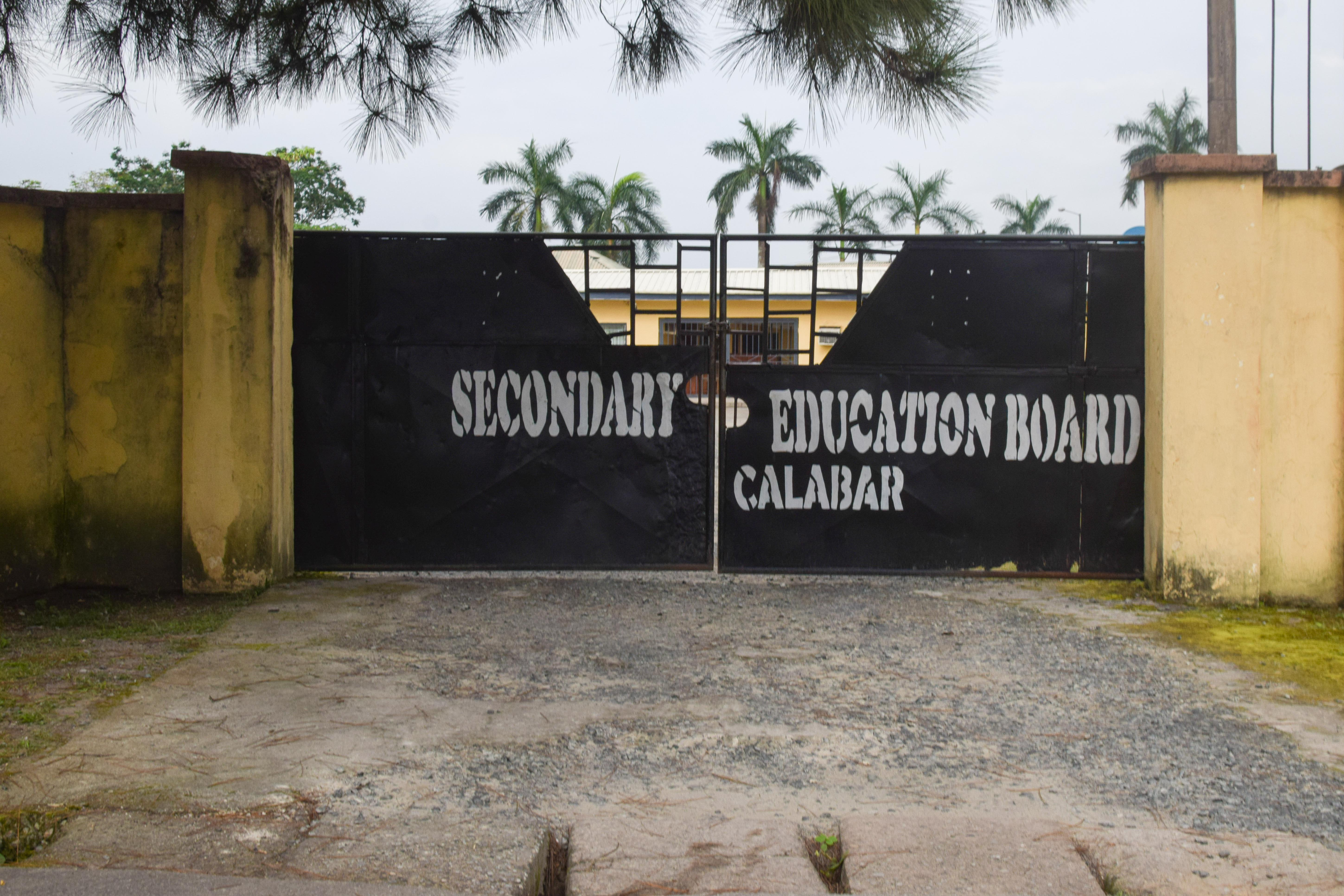

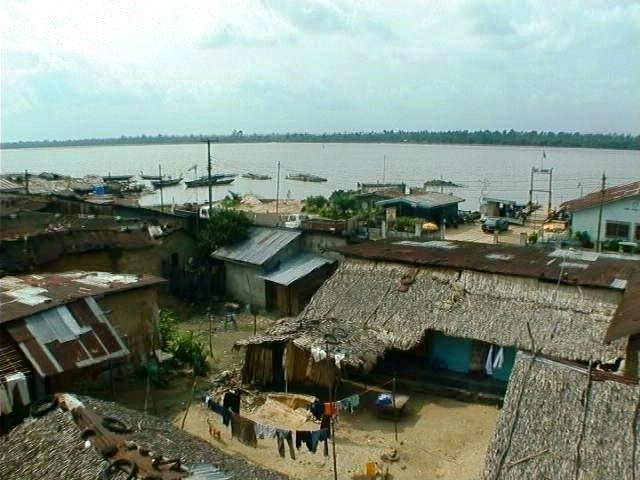

== See also ==
- Banknotes of Scotland (featured on design)
- Kalabari tribe
- Efik people
