= University of Calabar Teaching Hospital =

Nigerian teaching hospital

Geography
- Location: Calabar, Cross River, Nigeria
- Coordinates: 4.95485°N 8.35031°E

Organisation
- Type: Research, Teaching and Tertiary
- Affiliated university: University of Calabar

Services
- Emergency department: Yes

History
- Opened: 1979

Links
- Website: www.ucthcalabar.gov.ng
- Lists: Hospitals in Nigeria

University of Calabar Teaching Hospital (UCTH), located in Cross River state, Nigeria, was established in 1979 to provide tertiary healthcare and facilitate training of undergraduate medical students at the University of Calabar, Calabar. The facility is located at Calabar in Calabar Municipality Local Government Area of Cross River State, South South, Nigeria. UCTH is affiliated with University of Calabar, Calabar.

== Leadership ==
UCTH is headed by a Chief Medical Director who reports to the Minister of Health. In 2019, the Federal Government appointed Prof. Ikpeme A. Ikpeme as the Chief Medical Director.
