= Cross River (Nigeria) =

River in southeastern Nigeria

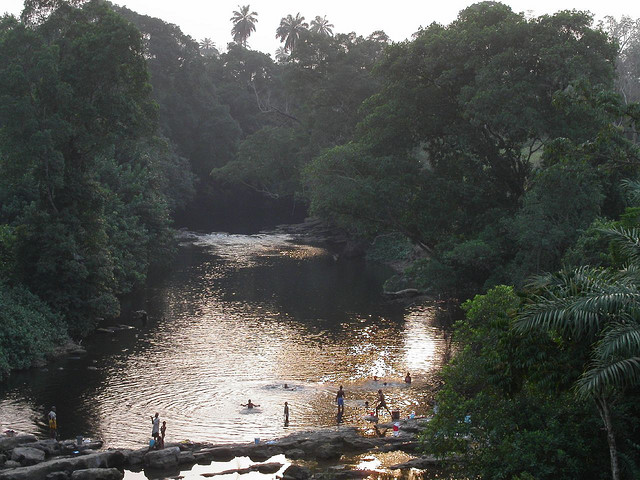
- Cross River near the town of Mamfe, Cameroon

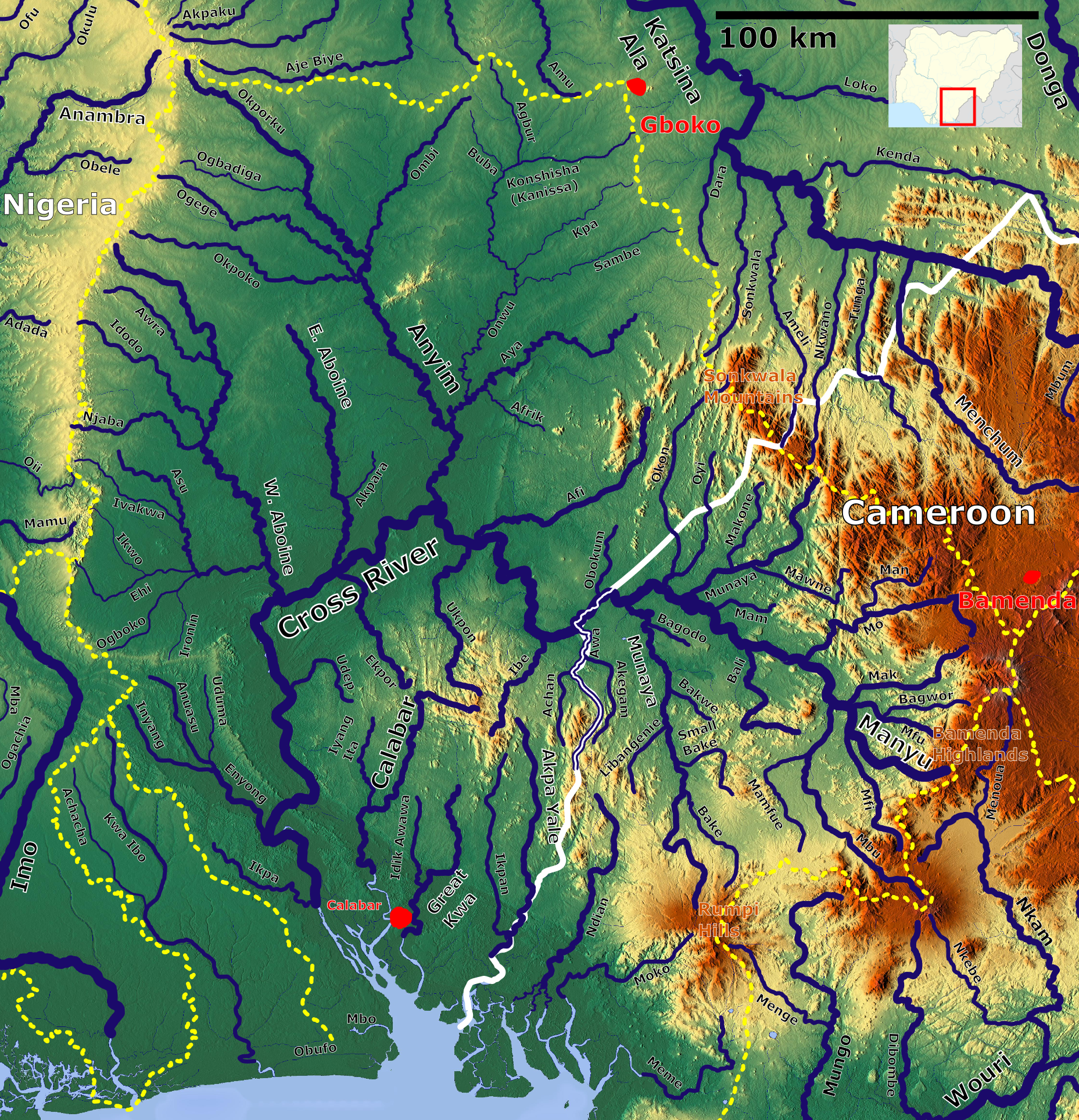
- Native name: Oyono

Location
- Country: Cameroon, Nigeria

Physical characteristics
- Source: Cameroonian Highlands forests, Cameroon
  - coordinates: 5°23′30.6996″N 9°51′44.586″E
  - elevation: 2,728 m (8,950 ft)
- Mouth: Bight of Biafra
  - coordinates: 4°45′39.6″N 8°20′48.5″E
  - elevation: 0 m (0 ft)
- Length: 489 km (304 mi)
- Basin size: 52,471 km^{2} (20,259 mi^{2}) to 53,590 km^{2} (20,690 mi^{2})
- Discharge
  - location: Cross River Estuary, Bight of Biafra, Nigeria
  - average: (Period: 1979–2015) 83.52 km^{3}/a (2,647 m^{3}/s) (Period: 1971–2000) 2,465.5 m^{3}/s (87,070 cu ft/s)
- Discharge
  - location: Mamfe, Cameroon (Basin size: 6,810 km^{2} (2,630 sq mi)
  - average: (Period: 1967–1977)569.4 m^{3}/s (20,110 cu ft/s)
  - minimum: 32.3 m^{3}/s (1,140 cu ft/s)
  - maximum: 2,270 m^{3}/s (80,000 cu ft/s)

Basin features
- River system: Cross River
- Tributaries
  - left: Mfi, Mbu, Bali, Munaya, Awa, Ibe, Ukpon, Ekpor, Udep, Calabar, Great Kwa
  - right: Bagwor, Mak, Mo, Mam, Munaya, Oyi, Obokum, Afi, Anyim, East Aboine, West Aboine, Enyong, Ikpa

Cross River (native name: Oyono) is the main river in southeastern Nigeria and gives its name to Cross River State. It originates in Cameroon, where it takes the name of the Manyu River. Although not long by African standards its catchment has high rainfall and it becomes very wide. Over its last 80 kilometres (50 mi) to the sea it flows through swampy rainforest with numerous creeks and forms an inland delta near its confluence with the Calabar River, about 20 kilometres (12 mi) wide and 50 kilometres (31 mi) long between the cities of Oron on the west bank and Calabar, on the east bank, more than 30 kilometres (19 mi) from the open sea. The delta empties into a broad estuary which it shares with a few smaller rivers. At its mouth in the Atlantic Ocean, the estuary is 24 kilometres (15 mi) wide. The eastern side of the estuary is in the neighboring country of Cameroon.

The major tributary of Cross River is the river Aloma, coming from Benue State to merge with Cross River in Cross River State. Cross River State is connected with a major highway to its sister state Akwa Ibom. The distance between Oron and Calabar is 21 kilometres (13 mi) by boat and about 200 kilometres (120 mi) by road. The population of the lower Cross River traditionally use water transport and Calabar has long had a major seaport, in the Calabar River about 10 kilometres (6 mi) from its confluence with the Cross River and about 55 kilometres (34 mi) from the sea. The Itu bridge on the Cross River is along Itu-Calabar highway and is reported to be one of the landmark achievements of the Gowon administration when it was completed in 1975.

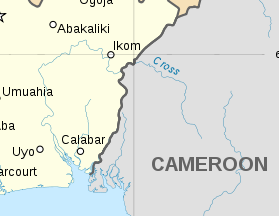
The Cross River, flowing through Cameroon and Nigeria

The Cross River forms a boundary between two tropical moist forest ecoregions: the Cross-Niger transition forests, which lie west of the river between the Cross and Niger Rivers, and the Cross-Sanaga-Bioko coastal forests, which lie to the east between the Cross River and the Sanaga River of Cameroon. The average annual rainfall varies from 1,760 mm in the northern part of the state to 3,100 mm in the southern part (WSSSRP II 2016).

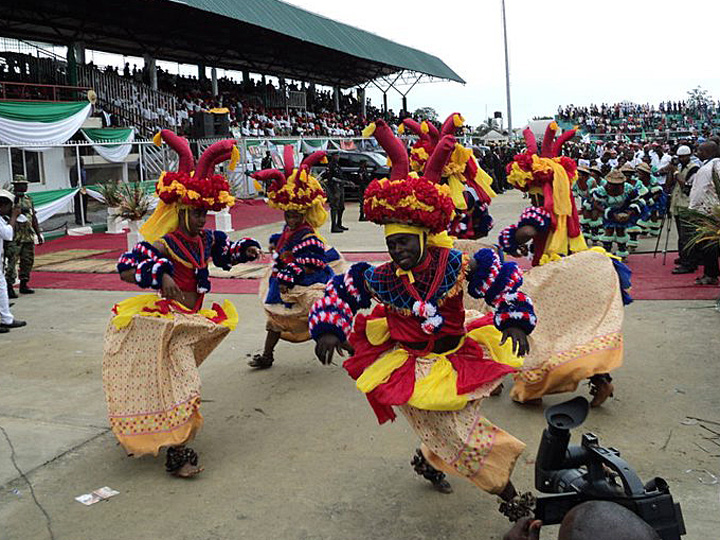
Dancers in Cross river state attire

Cross River also gives its name to a national park and a family of languages.

The Cross River Region is of great historical importance, being a) within the likely homeland from which Bantu speaking people migrated across most of Sub-Saharan Africa 3000–5000 years ago, b) the location of where the Nsibidi Script was created, and c) the location of Calabar, one of the largest centers during the Atlantic slave trade.

== Pollution ==
During some months of monitoring, iron, manganese, lead, arsenic, and chromium were identified in the water at levels hazardous for drinking; thus, the water was polluted with these heavy metals and could not be relied on to serve as a potable water supply for Nigerians.
