= Summit Hills =

Summit Hills, Summit Hill or Summithill may refer to:

== Places ==
In the United States

- Summit Hills (New Mexico), a range in New Mexico
- Summithill, Ohio, an unincorporated community
- Summit Hill, Pennsylvania, a borough
- Summit Hill, Saint Paul, Minnesota

Elsewhere

- Summit Hills, Nigeria, a real estate development in Nigeria
