= Schweizer Bobbahn =

Schweizer Bobbahn refers to two steel roller coasters in Germany:

- Schweizer Bobbahn (Europa-Park)
- Bobbahn at Heide-Park, formerly named Schweizer Bobbahn as well
