= Coyote Wash =

Coyote Wash may mean:

== A watercourse in ==
=== Arizona ===
- Coyote Wash (Whiskey Creek tributary) in the Canyon de Chelly National Monument
- Coyote Wash (Butler Wash tributary)
- Coyote Wash (San Carlos Reservoir, Gila River tributary)
- Coyote Wash (Railroad Wash tributary)
- Coyote Wash (Delaney Wash tributary)
- Coyote Wash (Rincon Creek tributary)
- Coyote Wash (Los Encinos Wash tributary)
- Coyote Wash (Agua Fria River tributary)
- Coyote Wash (Gila River tributary)

=== California ===
- Coyote Wash (California)

=== Colorado ===
- Coyote Wash (Highline Lake)
- Coyote Wash (Marble Wash)
- Coyote Wash (Dolores River)

=== New Mexico ===
- Coyote Wash (Chaco River tributary)

=== Nevada ===
- Coyote Wash (Parsnip Wash)
- Coyote Wash (Dry Lake, Lincoln County, Nevada)

=== Utah ===
- Coyote Wash (Buckskin Gulch) tributary to Paria River
