= Coyote Wash (Railroad Wash tributary) =

Stream in Greenlee County, Arizona and Hidalgo County, New Mexico

Coyote Wash is a tributary stream of Railroad Wash, in Greenlee County, Arizona. Its mouth is at an elevation of 3,850 feet (1,170 m), at its confluence with Railroad Wash. Its source is at an elevation of 4,400 feet (1,300 m) at 32°32′57″N 109°07′00″W in the Bobcat Hills.
