= Bobcat Hills =

Bobcat Hills may refer to the following landforms:

- Bobcat Hills (Greenlee County, Arizona)
- Bobcat Hills (Upton County, Texas)
- Bobcat Hills (San Bernardino County, California)
