= Calabar Free Trade Zone =

Coordinates: 5°1′18″N 8°19′13″E

The Calabar Free Trade Zone (CFTZ) is an area just north of the port of Calabar, Cross River State, Nigeria that is occupied by companies engaged in manufacturing, trading, provision of services and oil and gas related activities. These companies benefit from special taxation rules and duty-free imports.

The enabling act for Registered Free Zones in Nigeria came into effect in 1992. The Calabar Free Trade Zone, the first of these, was fully completed by 1999 and started operation after official commissioning in November 2001. The CFTZ is owned by the Federal government. Lack of dredging in the Calabar River channel was also affecting the zone, forcing companies to rely on Port Harcourt or Lagos for import and export of goods. These problems had not been addressed by December 2010, when the General Manager of the zone said the epileptic power supply, poor quality roads and non dredging of the river channel had slowed development of the port. He said "... often times we have had cases of containers dropping from trucks due to bad roads. It is also additional cost to transport containers from Port Harcourt and Lagos to Calabar".

The Tinapa Free Zone & Resort, to the north of the Free Zone, was commissioned on 2 April 2007, intended to combine business and recreational functions with duty-free shopping. The legal status of the Tinapa Free Trade zone has been uncertain. It is owned by the Cross River state government, but only the Federal government can operate a free trade zone. Governor Liyel Imoke appealed to the Federal Government to take a stake in the project, and to remove uncertainty about Tinapa's status, which is hindering investment.

In September 2009, Cross River Governor Liyel Imoke said the 1992 laws that established the Calabar Export Processing Zone should be overhauled to match its current status as a Free Trade Zone. He also said the 2005 gazette that made Calabar Port a Free Port should be implemented. In August 2011, Olusegun Aganga, the Federal Minister of Trade and Investment, visited the Calabar Free Trade Zone and the Tinapa Business and Leisure resort. He said that the government planned an extensive review of Free Trade Zones across the country to ensure they met the requirements to attract Foreign Direct Investment and to create jobs.
