= 2007 Cross River State gubernatorial election =

State election in Nigeria

- April 14, 2007
Nominee	Liyel Imoke	Eyo Etim Nyong
Party	PDP	DPP
Popular vote	836,207	14,067
Governor before election
Donald Duke
PDP
Elected Governor
Liyel Imoke
PDP

The 2007 Cross River State gubernatorial election was the 6th gubernatorial election of Cross River State. Held on April 14, 2007, the People's Democratic Party nominee Liyel Imoke won the election, defeating Eyo Etim Nyong of the Democratic People's Party.

== Results ==
Liyel Imoke from the People's Democratic Party won the election, defeating Eyo Etim Nyong from the Democratic People's Party. Registered voters was 1,139,736.

2007 Cross River State gubernatorial election
Party	Candidate	Votes	%	±%
PDP	Liyel Imoke	836,207	0	
DPP	Eyo Etim Nyong	14,067	0	
PDP hold				
