= Calabar International Convention Centre =

Convention centre in Cross River, Nigeria

Coordinates: 5.0429°N 8.3143°E

The Calabar International Convention Centre is located in Calabar, Cross River, Nigeria. It opened in the third quarter of 2015. It was built by the state former governor Liyel Imoke. Liyel Imoke a Nigerian politician served as the governor of Cross River State Nigeria from 29 May 2007 until 29 May 2015. The governor obtained his B.A degree in International Relations and LLB degree from the University of Maryland (U.S.) and Buckingham (England). He was called to Nigerian Bar in 1988.

== About Calabar International Convention Centre ==
Calabar International Convention Centre (CICC) consists of four adjoining sculptural volumes called blocks. The building is situated on top of a hill and has tropical panoramic views of the Calabar River from all the foyers. The design and overall aesthetic of the CICC was the work of the Danish architects, Henning Larsen Architects.

Calabar ICC is the vision of the former Governor of Cross River State, Senator Liyel Imoke. The Centre will run as a partnership between the Cross River State Government and Alliance Venue and Facility Management.

== Venues ==
The flexible building design allows for several types of events to take place at the same time. The CICC will be able to accommodate up to 5,000 delegates in 21 different venues, with as many as 2,000 for plenary sessions and as little as 10 in a small meeting room. Also, there are dedicated offices for event organizers and VIP rooms in most blocks. All halls are designed with acoustic walls, to reduce sound travel around the building to the barest minimum.

Events with exhibition component can be comfortably hosted at the CICC as there is exhibition space in conference halls and foyers. There is also additional per-allocated space for temporary exhibition marquee up to 5,000 sqm, directly connected to the Main Hall and the other conference halls.

== Management ==
On 28 August 2014, CICC welcomed a new management company, Alliance Venue and Facilities Management Pty (AVFM). In November 2014, Paul D'Arcy, meetings industry acclaimed 'Centre-opener', was appointed CEO of the CICC,. Other appointments into the management team included MICE marketing expert, Ben Asoro as Commercial Director and Adele Eloff as Director of Operations.

== Quick Facts ==
It is located 11 km north of Calabar at the Calabar River. Part of the 367 ha Summit Hills development (CICC, 18-hole golf course, business hotel, specialist hospital, residential villas)

It is located 18 km (30 minutes drive) from Margaret Ekpo International Airport.

The Architects were: Henning Larsen Architects, Copenhagen, Denmark

It has a total floor space of 35 000sqm.

With a total number of conference rooms: 21 Conference Rooms which consists of 5 conference halls (220-2,000 delegates),12 meeting rooms (55-90 delegates), 3 meeting suites (10-25 delegates) and 1 VIP room

- Lounges and foyers: 3 Venues
- Largest room: Main Hall with 2,000 seats
- Total capacity of the centre: Approximately 5,000 delegates
- Largest banqueting spaces: Main Hall (900 dinner guests) – Hall B; Hall A (650 dinner guests) Hall C (500 dinner guests)
- Main kitchen: 1,200sqm, largest in Nigeria and 4 distribution kitchens
- Exhibition space: In conference halls and foyers. Additional pre-allocated space for temporary exhibition marquee up to 5,000sqm at the back of the CICC, directly connected to the Main Hall and the other conference halls
- Coffee shop: In entrance hall, 40 seats
- Parking: Secure parking for 700 vehicles

== Transport ==
The convention centre is connected to the Tinapa Business and Leisure Resort by the 1.1 kilometres (0.68 mi) Calabar Monorail, built by Intamin, which opened in 2016. In 2017, it was reported the system was working but was not carrying any passengers.
