= 1992 Nigerian Senate elections in Cross River State =

1992 Nigerian Senate election in Cross River State

The 1992 Nigerian Senate election in Cross River State was held on July 4, 1992, to elect members of the Nigerian Senate to represent Cross River State. Patrick Offiong Ali representing Cross River South, Liyel Imoke representing Cross River Central and Paul Oluohu Ukpo representing Cross River North all won on the platform of the National Republican Convention.

== Overview ==
Affiliation	Party		Total
Affiliation	SDP	NRC	Total
Before Election			3
After Election	0	3	3

== Summary ==
District	Incumbent	Party	Elected Senator	Party
Cross River South			Patrick Offiong Ali	NRC
Cross River Central			Liyel Imoke	NRC
Cross River North			Paul Oluohu Ukpo	NRC

== Results ==
=== Cross River South ===
The election was won by Patrick Offiong Ali of the National Republican Convention.

1992 Nigerian Senate election in Cross River State
Party	Candidate	Votes	%
NRC	Patrick Offiong Ali		
Total votes			
NRC hold			

=== Cross River Central ===
The election was won by Liyel Imoke of the National Republican Convention.

1992 Nigerian Senate election in Cross River State
Party	Candidate	Votes	%
NRC	Liyel Imoke		
Total votes			
NRC hold			

=== Cross River North ===
The election was won by Paul Oluohu Ukpo of the National Republican Convention.

1992 Nigerian Senate election in Cross River State
Party	Candidate	Votes	%
NRC	Paul Oluohu Ukpo		
Total votes			
NRC hold			
