= Calabar Monorail =

Rail transportation

Overview
- Status: Abandoned
- Locale: Calabar, Nigeria
- Stations: 3

Service
- Type: Monorail
- Services: 1

History
- Opened: 2016
- Closed: 2017

Technical
- Line length: 1.1 kilometres (0.68 mi)
- Number of tracks: Single-track

The Calabar Monorail is an abandoned monorail system in Calabar, state capital of Cross River state, Nigeria. The single-track, 1.1 kilometres (0.68 mi) line runs from the Calabar International Convention Centre to the Tinapa Resort. The project was initiated by the former governor of Cross River state, Senator Liyel Imoke and completed by successor Benedict Ayade.

== Facilities ==
The Calabar Monorail is an Intamin P8 shuttle with 12 cars and a total capacity of 88 passengers.

After successful trials of the Calabar Monorail, the governor of Cross Rivers state, Benedict Ayade disclosed that there were plans to extend the monorail up to the Margaret Ekpo International Airport in Calabar.

== History ==
The Calabar Monorail project, which is estimated to have cost 5 to 7 billion naira (US$25-35 million) was inaugurated in 2016 by the Executive President of Nigeria, Muhammadu Buhari and this was also to mark a year in office for the governor of Cross Rivers state, Benedict Ayade.

Shortly after inauguration, the monorail was grounded by theft of cable. Tinapa Resort denied reports that thieves had stolen cable from the monorail, stating that it is in "perfect condition" but there is simply no patronage. In 2018, Senator Ben Ayade stated that the monorail's total revenue in the year 2017 amounted to only 83,000 naira (US$275) and that "every day it runs from Tinapa to CICC empty".

== See also ==
- List of monorail systems
