= Xi'an Qujiang Sightseeing Monorail =

Monorail line in Xi'an, China

Overview
- Locale: Qujiang New District, Xi'an
- Transit type: straddle-beam monorail
- Number of lines: 1
- Number of stations: 9

Operation
- Began operation: 1 May 2023; 3 years ago
- Number of vehicles: 3

Technical
- System length: 6.8 km (4.23 mi)
- Track gauge: 500 mm
- Top speed: 40 km/h

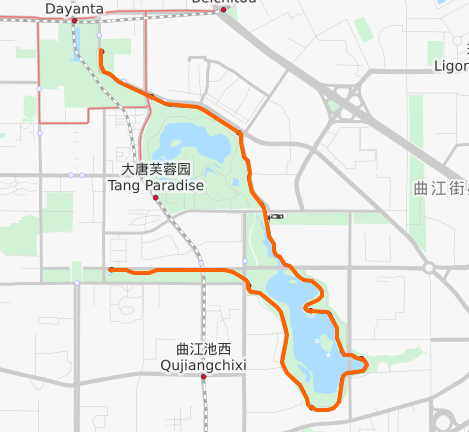
Map of Qujiang Sightseeing Monorail

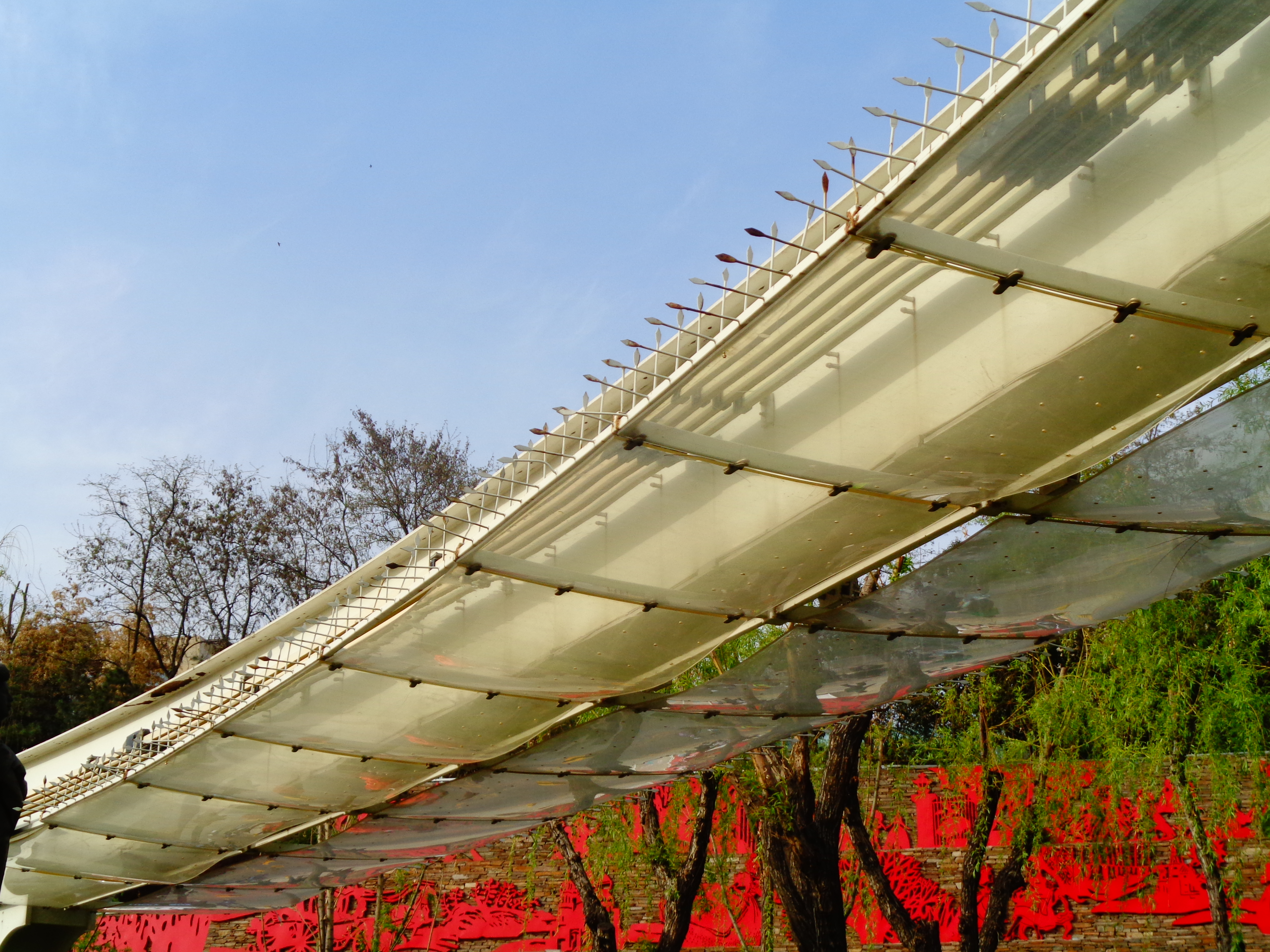
A section of the guideway

The Xi'an Qujiang Sightseeing Monorail (Chinese: 西安曲江观光轻轨; pinyin: Xī'ān Qǔjiāng Guānguāng Qīngguǐ) is a monorail line in the Qujiang New District of Xi'an, China. The line is a broken loop on the edge of the Nanhu (南湖) public park.

The system was completed in 2012, but did not receive approval for operations until 16 January 2015. After three months of operation service was suspended due to piles from the piers interfering with construction of metro line 4. In 2018, the western section of the route including two stations have been demolished. The single track had previously formed a closed loop.

After being re-furbished for bi-directional traffic, installing a passing loop between stations City-wall Relic Park East and Changguan Lou, the line was re-opened to public on 1 May 2023.

== Technical Information ==
The three trains were built by Intamin, of the variety P8/48. Each train can carry 48 passengers. The line has a support column every 15 meters.
