= 2008 Cross River State gubernatorial by-election =

2008 gubernatorial election in Cross River State, Nigeria

2008 Cross River State gubernatorial election
- August 23, 2008
Nominee	Liyel Imoke	Paul Ukpo
Party	PDP	ANPP
Running mate	Effiok Cobham
Popular vote	650,723	15,734
Governor before election
Timipre Sylva
PDP
Elected Governor
Liyel Imoke
PDP

The 2008 Cross River State gubernatorial election occurred on August 23, 2008. Incumbent PDP Governor Liyel Imoke won re-election in the supplementary election, defeating ANPP candidate, Paul Ukpo, to emerge winner.

Liyel Imoke emerged the PDP candidate at the primary election. His running mate Effiok Cobham.

== Electoral system ==
The Governor of Cross River State is elected using the plurality voting system.

== Results ==
The two main contenders registered with the Independent National Electoral Commission to contest in the re-run election were PDP Governor Liyel Imoke, who won the contest by polling 650,723 votes, and ANPP's Paul Ukpo, who follows closely with 15,734. There was a total of 694,853 votes cast in the election and 13,749 invalid votes.

Candidate	Party	Votes	%
Liyel Imoke	People's Democratic Party (PDP)	650,723	96.32
Paul Ukpo	All Nigeria Peoples Party (ANPP)	15,734	2.33
Democratic People's Party (DPP)	1,952	0.29	
ARP	1,951	0.29	
All Progressives Grand Alliance (APGA)	1,912	0.28	
NDP	1,404	0.21	
ADC	1,103	0.16	
Usani Uguru Usani	Action Congress (AC)	512	0.08
PPA	272	0.04	
Total		675,563	100.00
Valid votes		675,563	98.01
Invalid/blank votes		13,749	1.99
Total votes		689,312	100.00
Source: Online Nigeria,
