= Summit Hills, Cross River =

Real estate development in Calabar, Nigeria

Summit Hills
Project
- Construction started: 2013; 13 years ago

Location
- Interactive map of Summit Hills, Cross River
- Location: Calabar, Cross River State, Nigeria

Area
  - Total: 367 ha (908 acres)

Summit Hills is a 367-hectare/908-acre real estate development in Calabar, Cross River State, Nigeria. The development includes a convention centre, hotel, recreational facilities, and golf course with clubhouse, nature reserve, hospital and a variety of residential units. It is being developed by a group of public and private investors, including the Cross River State Government.

== History ==
Summit Hills was conceived in 2013 by the then-governor of Cross River State, Senator Liyel Imoke, as a way to diversify the state's economy and create jobs. The project is expected to cost over $5 billion US and is being completed in several phases.

The first phase, completed in 2015, included the construction of the Calabar International Convention Centre (CICC), the Four Points by Sheraton Hotel, Calabar, and the Calabar Golf Course and Clubhouse. The second phase, currently underway, includes the construction of a nature reserve, a hospital, and various residential units.

== Impact ==
This project is expected to have a significant impact on the economy of Cross River State. It is estimated that the project will create more than 10,000 jobs and generate over $1 billion in revenue for the state annually. The development is also expected to attract tourists from around the world. The CICC is one of the largest and most modern convention centers in Africa, and the Four Points by Sheraton Hotel is the first international hotel to open in Calabar in over 30 years.

== General information ==
Although still in the construction phase, the project is expected to be comparable in size to the Canary Wharf business estate in London or the Lower Manhattan district in New York City. The site includes a nature reserve for endangered species of monkeys native to Cross River State along with nature trails.

The development will be rolled out gradually in four phases. The first phase, ongoing, features the construction of the main road, followed by the CICC and the CICC Hotel. The second stage is the development of the residential area and the hospital. The third phase will see the completion of the golf course, clubhouse, and additional residential areas. The fourth and final stage will be the completion of the remaining residential area. The new Summit Hills development will be self-sufficient in the delivery of power generation via a local power plant situated in the vicinity.

== Sub-projects ==
Summit Hills is planned to be a large development area, with the following as constituent projects; Calabar International Convention Center (CICC), CICC Hotel, a golf course, private residences, a state-of-the-art hospital, a Carnival Village and a monorail.

=== Golf course ===
The golf course, designed by Thomson Perrett & Lobb, is situated on the western side of the main access road.

=== Hospital ===
The Hospital which is situated on the south-eastern part of the Summit Hills is a world-class medical center which upon completion will have facilities of various specialties including gynaecology, obstetrics, paediatrics, internal medicine, General surgery, orthopedics’ laboratory services, basic neology and basic cardiology with plans to extend to oncology in the near future. The hospital project will cost $40 million US dollars (6.4 billion Nigerian naira) and will be executed as a public private partnership between the cross river state government and UCL HealthCare Services Limited. The Cross River State Government is committing half of the capital funds needed, while the balance of the financial requirement will be sourced by the concessionaire, UCL HealthCare Services Limited .

=== Monorail ===
The site will include a monorail using electric powered passenger shuttle trains composed of ten cars with a total seating capacity of seventy-eight. The train will shuttle passengers between the CICC and the Tinapa complex allowing access to Studio Tinapa, Tinapa Shopping Center, and the Tinapa waterpark.
