= Railroad Wash (Gila River tributary) =

Stream

Railroad Wash is a seasonal stream or wash and a tributary of the Gila River. Its mouth is at its confluence with the Gila River, at an elevation of 3,839 feet (1,170 meters). Its source is located at an elevation of 4,237 feet on the west side of the Summit Hills, in Hidalgo County, New Mexico, at 32°29′04″N 108°59′12″W.
