= Toxic Garden =

Steel roller coaster at Heide Park

- Previously known as Limit (1999 to 2022)
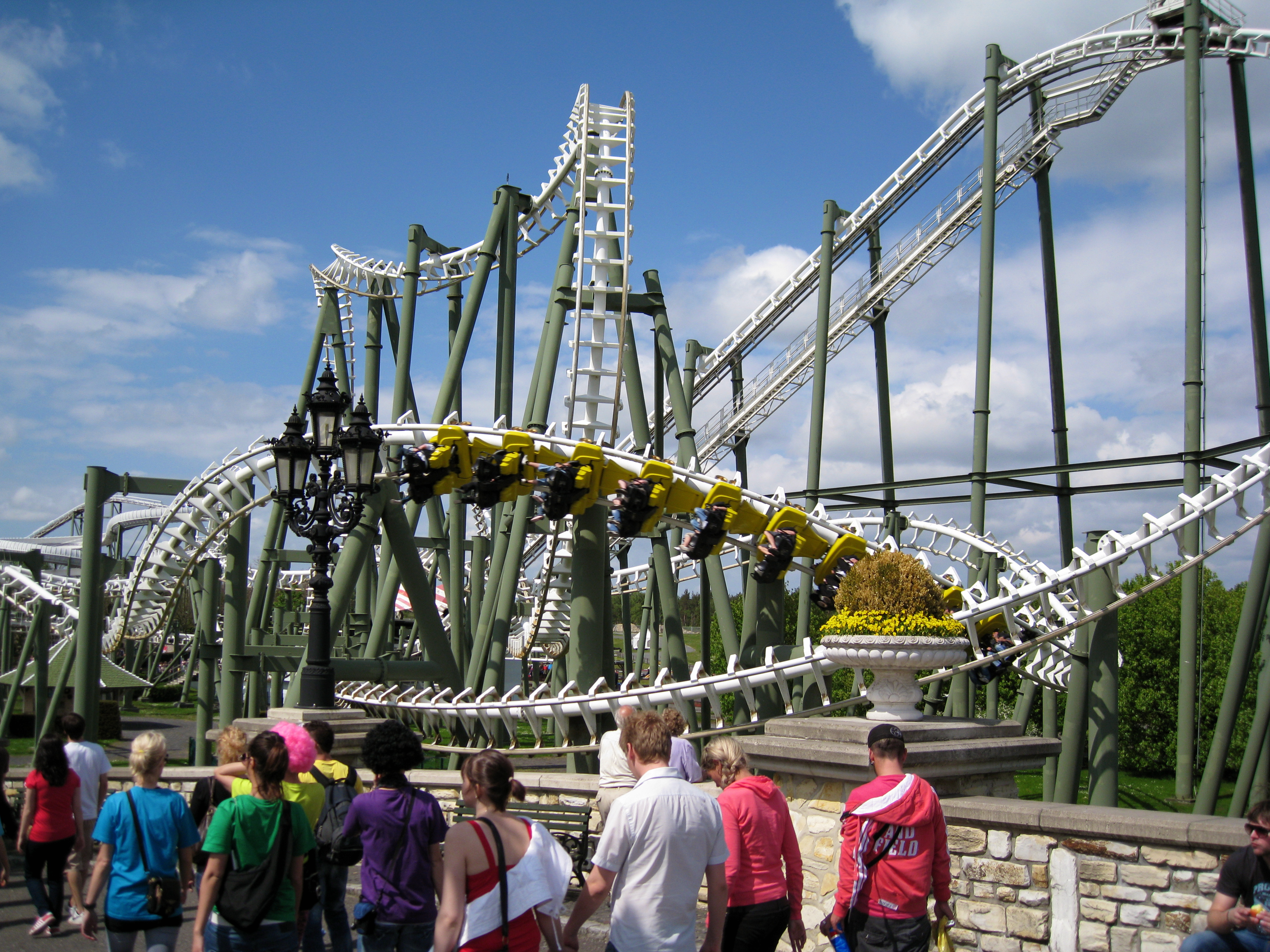
- Toxic Garden's layout and navigating the final turn before the brakes.

Heide Park
- Location: Heide Park
- Park section: Transilvania
- Coordinates: 53.02603°N 9.88175°E
- Status: Operating
- Opening date: 1999

General statistics
- Type: Steel – Inverted
- Manufacturer: Vekoma
- Model: SLC (689m Standard)
- Lift/launch system: Chain lift
- Height: 109.3 ft (33.3 m)
- Drop: 91 ft (28 m)
- Length: 2,260.5 ft (689.0 m)
- Speed: 49.7 mph (80.0 km/h)
- Inversions: 5
- Duration: 1:28
- Capacity: 1040 riders per hour
- Height restriction: 51–76.7 in (130–195 cm)
- Trains: 2 trains with 10 cars. Riders are arranged 2 across in a single row for a total of 20 riders per train.
- Toxic Garden at RCDB

Toxic Garden (formerly known as Limit) is a steel roller coaster located at Heide Park, Germany. It opened in 1999 and is a standard 689m layout Suspended Looping Coaster manufactured by Vekoma. In March 2023, Heide Park announced that Limit would be renamed to Toxic Garden, with new thematic elements and a partial replacement of the ride's track.

== Ride experience ==
The layout of the coaster, the 689m Standard.

After being dispatched from the station, trains climb the 33.3-metre-tall (109.3 ft) chain lift hill. Trains then descend the 28-metre-tall (91 ft) drop reaching a top speed of 80.0 kilometres per hour (49.7 mph). The train then navigates a rollover (2 half loops connected by two half heartline rolls). Once the train exits the rollover, it traverses a banked turn, sidewinder, helix, and double in-line twist. The train then performs a few turns before entering the brake run.
