= Intamin =

Liechtensteiner design and manufacturing company

- Industry: Manufacturing
- Founded: 1967
- Founder: Robert Spieldiener; Reinhold Spieldiener; Alfons Saiko
- Headquarters: Schaan, Liechtenstein
- Number of locations: 8
- Area served: Worldwide
- Key people: Patrick Spieldiener (CEO)
- Products: Amusement rides; roller coasters; transportation
- Divisions: Intamin Amusement Rides; Intamin Transportation
- Subsidiaries: ABC Engineering AG; ABC Rides
- Website: www.intamin.com

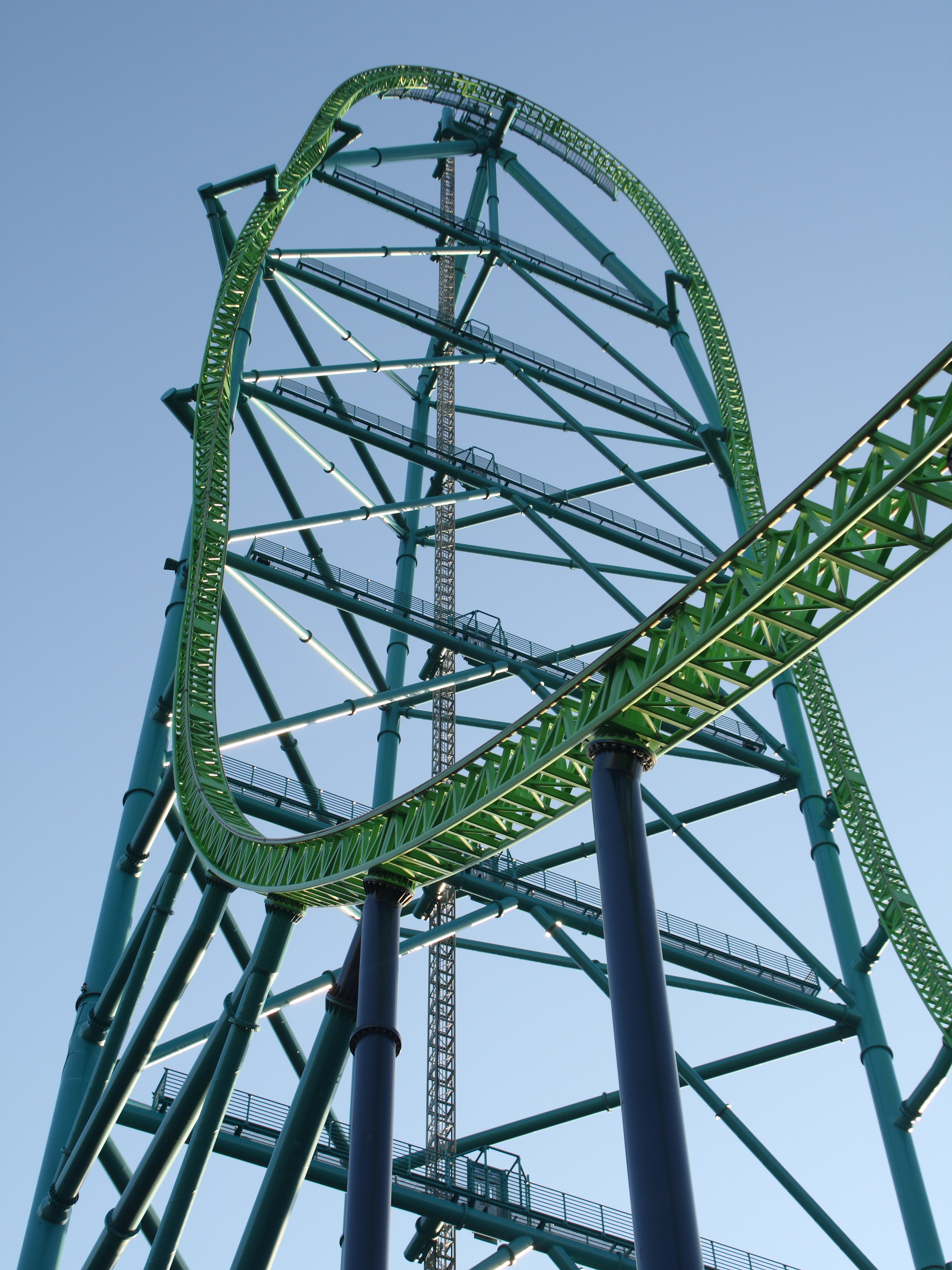
Kingda Ka at Six Flags Great Adventure was the world's tallest rollercoaster for 19 years

Intamin Amusement Rides is a design and manufacturing company in Schaan, Liechtenstein, best-known for designing and constructing thrill rides and roller coasters at dozens of international theme parks, amusement parks and other establishments. The Intamin brand name is a syllabic abbreviation for "international amusement installations". The company has corporate offices across the world, including three in Europe, three in Asia, and two in the United States.

== Products and technologies ==
Intamin's product range spans two broad categories: rides and transportation.

=== Amusement rides ===
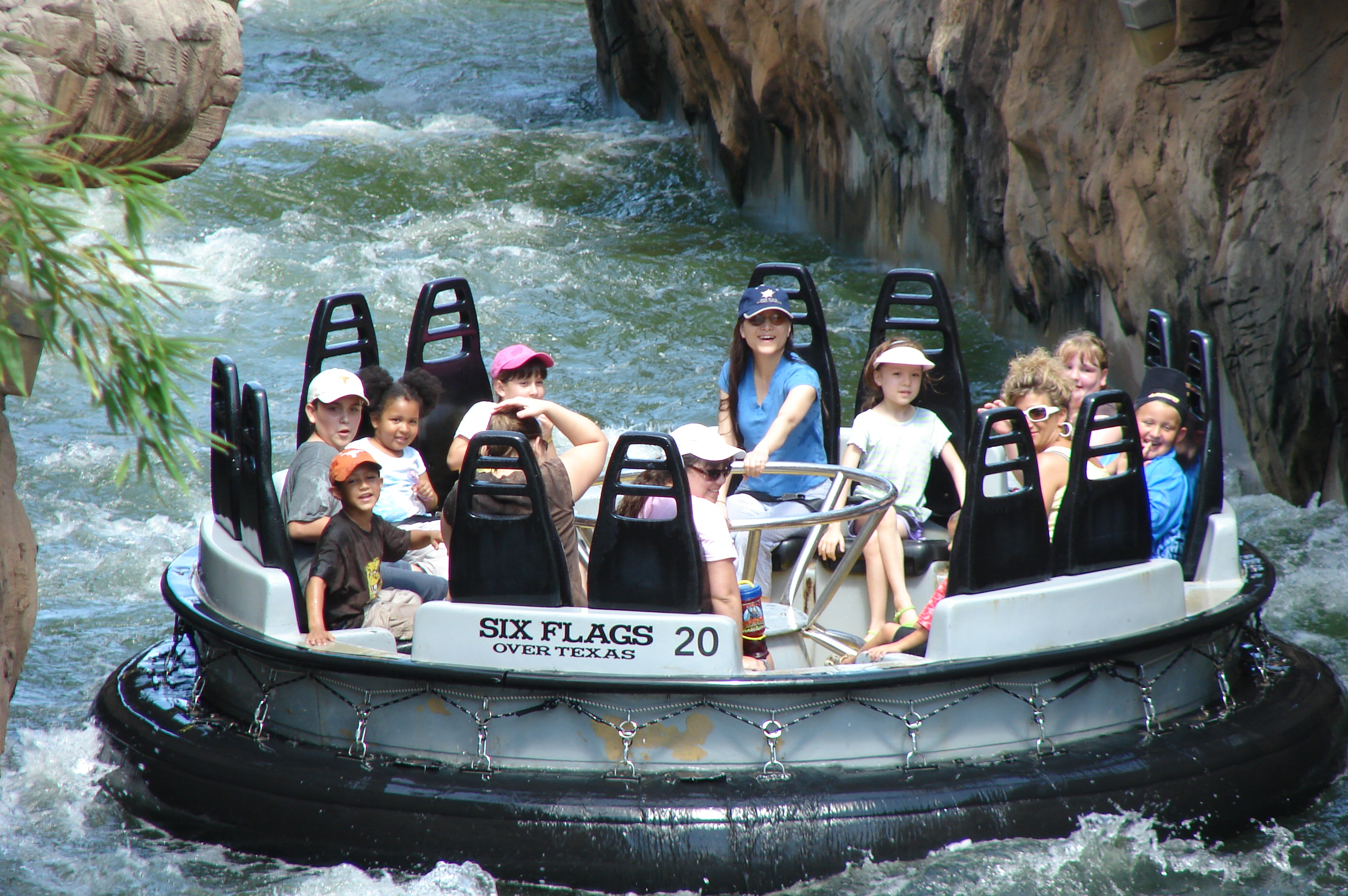
Roaring Rapids river ride at Six Flags Over Texas (2007)

==== Roller coasters ====
Intamin uses computerized and industrialized engineering and manufacturing methods for its wooden coasters, rather than traditional on-site fabrication. Coasters such as Colossos at Heide Park, Balder at Liseberg and El Toro at Six Flags Great Adventure utilized this manufacturing technique. Unlike other traditional wood coasters, these rides use prefabricated track sections made of a high-strength wooden laminate that can be secured on-site when the superstructure is completed. This design enables the coaster to reach speeds and navigate course elements smoothly, like a steel roller coaster, while retaining the look and some of the traditional feel of common wooden coasters.

Hydraulic Launch Coasters

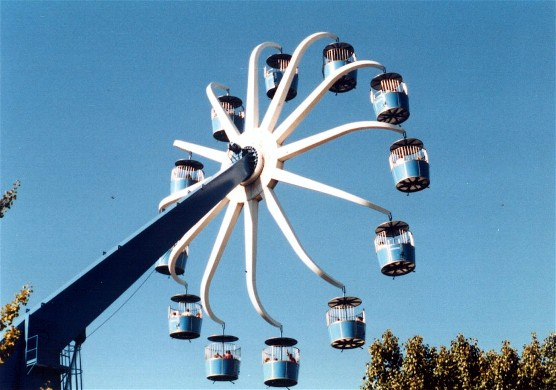
Giant Wheel, a double wheel at Hersheypark

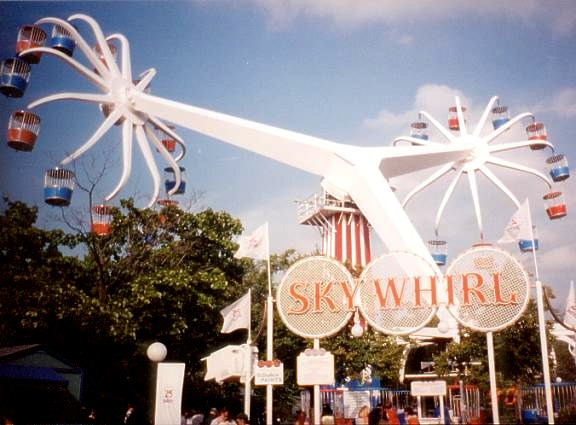
Sky Whirl, a triple wheel at Six Flags Great America

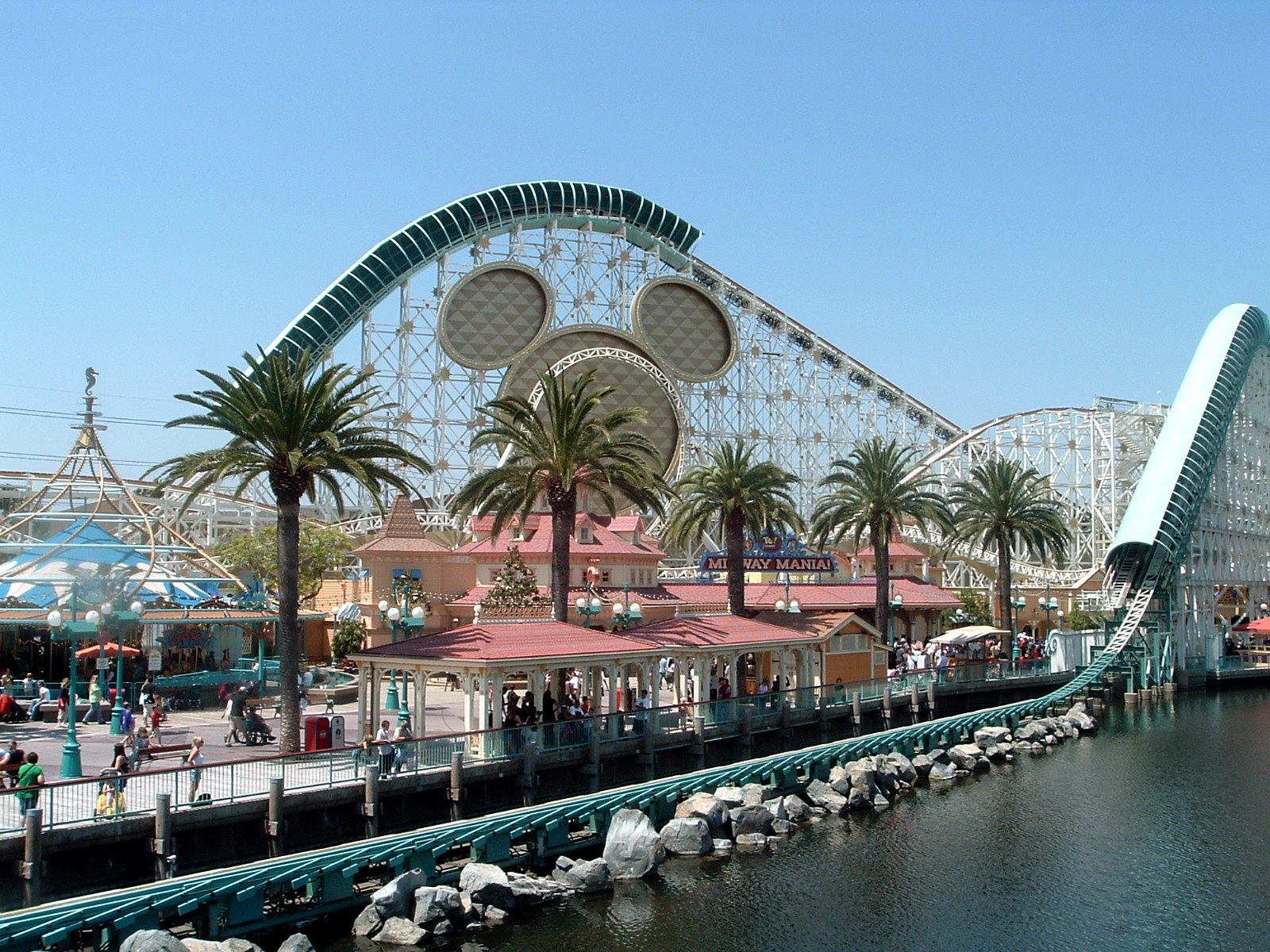
Incredicoaster, a Custom Intamin Looper at Disney California Adventure. Pictured as California Screamin'

Intamin brokered a number of rides that were manufactured by Waagner-Biro. These included a series of rides for Marriott Corporation, each comprising a vertical column supporting multiple horizontal arms, with each arm supporting a Ferris wheel. The first was Giant Wheel which operated at Hersheypark in Hershey, Pennsylvania, from 1973 until 2004. Similar Intamin supplied Waagner-Biro wheels included Zodiac (Kings Island, Mason, Ohio) and Scorpion (Parque de la Ciudad, Buenos Aires, Argentina). All are now defunct.

Sky Whirl, the world's first triple Ferris wheel, which debuted at both Marriott's Great America parks (now Six Flags Great America, Gurnee, Illinois, and California's Great America, Santa Clara) in 1976, was also manufactured by Waagner-Biro and brokered by Intamin. Also known as a triple Ferris wheel, Triple Giant Wheel, or Triple Tree Wheel, it was 33 metres (108 ft) in height. The Santa Clara ride, renamed Triple Wheel in post-Marriott years, closed on 1 September 1997. The Gurnee ride closed in 2000.

The Orlando Eye, which opened in April 2015, was designed and built by Intamin.

=== Transportation ===
Outside the amusement realm, Intamin supplies monorail transportation systems which are used in both public transport networks and at tourist attractions across the world. Intamin was responsible for the design and building of the Moscow Monorail (Russian: Московская Монорельсовая Транспортная Система (ММТС)), which is 4.7 kilometres (2.9 mi) long and is located in the North-Eastern Administrative Okrug of Moscow, Russia, running from the Timiryazevskaya metro station to Sergeya Eisensteina street. Planning of the monorail started in 1998. It has six stations.

In 2016, two monorails using Intamin equipment were opened: the 5.2 kilometres (3.2 mi) Ashgabat Monorail in Turkmenistan and the 1.1 kilometres (0.68 mi) Calabar Monorail in the Cross River State, Nigeria, which connects the Calabar International Convention Centre to the Tinapa Resort.

In 2020, the Marconi Express Monorail opened as a shuttle between the Bologna Guglielmo Marconi Airport and the Bologna Centrale railway station.

Intamin has also constructed monorails at amusement parks in Xi'an and Ningbo in China, and the Asia Park Monorail in Da Nang in Vietnam.

== Notable Intamin rides ==
- 1979: First roller coaster built by Intamin, Wilderness Run (formerly Jr. Gemini)
- 1981: First wooden coaster built by Intamin, American Eagle at Six Flags Great America
- 2000: First LIM-launched Twisted Impulse coaster, Superman: Ultimate Escape at Geauga Lake
- 2000: Five-time Golden Ticket Award winner, Superman The Ride at Six Flags New England
- 2000: World's first Giga coaster, (Note: A giga coaster is any roller coaster with a height of at least 300 feet (91 m), but less than 400 feet (122 m).) Millennium Force at Cedar Point
- 2001: First coaster to utilize a LIM launch hill, Incredicoaster (formerly California Screamin') at Disney California Adventure,
- 2001: First wooden coaster with prefabricated track, Colossos at Heide Park
- 2002: First hydraulic catapult launch coaster, Xcelerator at Knott's Berry Farm
- 2003: World's first Strata coaster, (Note: A strata coaster is any roller coaster with a height of at least 400 feet (122 m), but less than 500 feet (152 m).) Top Thrill Dragster at Cedar Point (now Top Thrill 2)
- 2005: World's tallest roller coaster from its opening in 2005 until its closure in 2024, Kingda Ka at Six Flags Great Adventure
- 2010: World's fastest roller coaster from 2010 until 2025. Reaching speeds of 240 kilometres per hour (149 mph), Formula Rossa at Ferrari World Abu Dhabi
- 2024: World's first Dynamic Motion Stage, Danse Macabre (Efteling)
- 2025: World's first Exa coaster, (Note: An exa coaster, while a relatively new term, is any roller coaster with a height of at least 600 feet (183 m).) Falcons Flight at Six Flags Qiddiya City. The world's tallest, longest, and fastest roller coaster.

== Incidents ==
Intamin has had a number of safety-related incidents, though given the company’s long history, virtually all of the rides in this section have already been removed or modified to run incident-free.

- In 1984, three passengers riding The Edge at Six Flags Great America were injured and briefly hospitalized. The ride experienced a malfunction that caused it to fall backward down the wrong shaft.
- On June 9, 1991, 32-year-old Candy Taylor of Toledo, Ohio, fell to her death from Flight Commander, an Intamin Flight Trainer, located at Kings Island. Investigators determined that a design flaw in the seat divider could allow a rider to slide into an unoccupied seat and become free from the restraint. A coroner's report later revealed that the victim had a blood-alcohol level of 0.30 which may have also contributed. Speculation suggests the rider lost consciousness during the ride and slid out from the restraints.
- On May 16, 1999, a 365 lb (166 kg) guest was unable to close his lap bar on Ride of Steel at Six Flags Darien Lake. As a result, he was ejected, fell approximately 9 feet as the ride went over a camel hump hill, and suffered serious injuries. He sued the park and the ride manufacturer for negligence and was awarded US$3.95 million.
- In August 1999, a 12-year-old mentally disabled boy fell from the 207-foot (63 m) high Drop Tower: Scream Zone, at California's Great America, and died. The victim's family claimed his harness was not locked properly. An investigation was inconclusive and no charges were filed.
- In September 2001, a 40-year-old woman fell from Perilous Plunge (Knott's Berry Farm) into the water, was hit by the boat, and died. An investigation showed that the 300 lb (140 kg) woman had loosened the safety restraints, so she could fit more comfortably into the ride.
- On April 16, 2004, a 16-year-old girl from Pontypool was killed after falling approximately 30 m (100 ft) into shallow water from the top of Hydro (later renamed Drenched) at Oakwood Leisure Park, Narberth, Pembrokeshire, United Kingdom. During a lawsuit brought by the victim's family against Oakwood, a jury returned a narrative verdict stating that the victim had fallen out due to being improperly restrained.
- The second incident of 2004 was on one of Intamin's mega coasters, Superman: Ride of Steel, at Six Flags New England in Massachusetts. The ride, again with lap bar restraints, was dispatched with a rider who had cerebral palsy in the front seat; this passenger subsequently died after being ejected from his seat. According to an investigation, the ride operators were primarily to blame, for not ensuring the rider was properly secured. Intamin was also partially blamed, as the ride's safety system allowed the train to be dispatched without all of the restraints properly secured.
- The third incident of 2004 happened on July 14, on Cedar Point's Top Thrill Dragster. During the initial launch, in which the train accelerates from 0 to 120 miles per hour (190 km/h) in 4 seconds, the riders were struck by metal debris that sheared off from the coaster's launch cable. The majority of guests waiting in the queue line would be standing no more than 10 to 15 feet from the track, at closest range. They were treated at the park's first aid station. Two were further treated at Firelands Regional Medical Center.
- In June 2007, a 13-year-old girl lost both feet at the ankles on Superman: Tower of Power, at Six Flags Kentucky Kingdom, when a ride malfunction and improper maintenance caused a cable to snap. She was brought to the hospital in critical condition, but survived, with doctors being able to re-attach her right foot. The park was later fined $1,000 for not properly maintaining the ride; an undisclosed settlement was later reached with Six Flags, which will provide for her for the remainder of her life.
- On September 16, 2009, two guests were injured when the launch cable snapped on Xcelerator at Knott's Berry Farm. The train launches riders from 0 to 80 miles per hour in a matter of seconds, ascends a vertical top-hat, and descends down the other side. The 12-year-old victim had lacerations on his leg, while the adult victim complained of back injuries.
- On April 29, 2010, a ride train on Expedition GeForce partially derailed from the track, fully occupied with passengers. The train came to a halt 20 metres (66 ft) above the ground, with eight riders complaining of nausea and bruising.
- On July 8, 2011, a 29-year-old guest was killed when he was ejected from Superman: Ride of Steel. The rider, an Iraq War veteran whose legs had been amputated, was on the front row of the roller coaster when he was thrown from the train during the course of the ride. Park officials stated that the ride was in proper mechanical order and that the various safety restraints were also working normally at the time of the incident, but that the attraction would remain closed pending an investigation. It was determined that ride operators at the time should not have permitted the man to get on the ride, due to his status as a double amputee.
- On February 24, 2012, a 14-year-old girl died in an accident at Hopi Hari, Vinhedo, São Paulo State, Brazil. She fell from the La Tour Eiffel drop tower ride, suffered cranial trauma, and died on the way to hospital. Initial investigations suggested the possibility of mechanical failure in a restraint latch.
- On July 19, 2013, a boat on the Shoot the Rapids log flume (at Cedar Point) rolled back down the ride's lift hill and flipped over, injuring seven, and was said to leave them stranded under water for a few minutes before guests and park employees could get them out. Six were cleared by park medical staff, and one was examined at a local hospital before being released. The ride closed during the investigation. Cedar Point reopened the ride in May 2014 but it would close in 2015.
- On July 7, 2014, a teenager was killed after his harness sprung open on Inferno, a ZacSpin fourth-dimension roller coaster at Terra Mítica in Benidorm, Spain.
- On May 9, 2017, an 11-year-old girl, Evha Jannath, died from her injuries after she fell from the Splash Canyon ride and into the water at Drayton Manor Theme Park in England. The water ride remained closed between 2017 and 2021 following the HSE safety examination. It reopened as River Rapids in 2021, rethemed and refurbished into a tamer ride with gated boats.
- On July 3, 2021, an 11-year-old boy died and five others were injured on the Raging River at Adventureland Park in Altoona, Iowa when their raft flipped over. The raft was found to be under inflated by the park staff, and the ride's emergency drainage system failed due to lack of maintenance.
- On August 15, 2021, a female guest was seriously injured while standing in line at Cedar Point when a metal object dislodged from Top Thrill Dragster and struck her in the head. The ride was shut down following the incident, and remained standing but not operating until Cedar Point announced its retirement in 2022. In 2024, the ride would reopen as Top Thrill 2, following significant modifications.
- On April 7, 2023, two female guests were injured at Futuroscope, a French theme park, when a lithium battery on a train car caught fire. The guests suffered burns and were hospitalized. Park employees exposed to lithium fumes were treated on premises. The ride reopened in June without the spinning feature.
