= Ashgabat Monorail =

Monorail in Ashgabat, Turkmenistan

Overview
- Locale: Ashgabat, Turkmenistan
- Transit type: Monorail
- Number of lines: 1
- Number of stations: 8

Operation
- Began operation: 5 May 2016
- Operator: Intamin

Technical
- System length: 5.2 kilometres (3 mi)
- Top speed: 80 km/h
System map
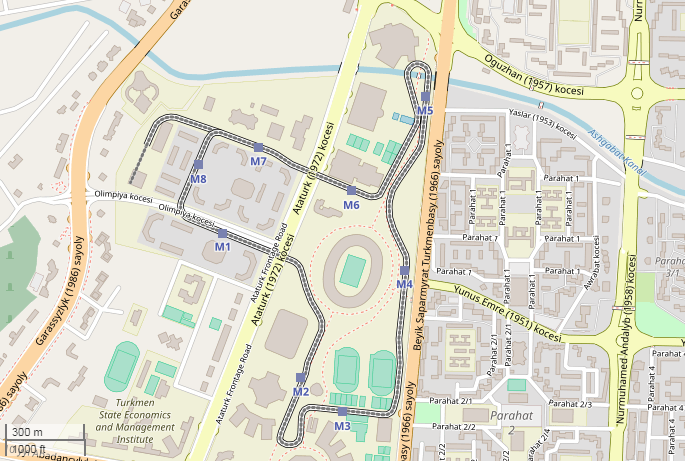

The Ashgabat Monorail (Turkmen: Aşgabat monorels ýoly) is a monorail line on the Olympic Village in Ashgabat, Turkmenistan. Construction started in 2012, by Turkish construction company Polimeks and completed in 2016. It uses a 25-meter rolling stock by Intamin.

== History ==
Construction began in 2012 by the Turkish company Polimeks. It became operational in April 2016 and was officially inaugurated on May 5, 2016. Full-scale operations commenced with the opening of the Asian Indoor and Martial Arts Games in Ashgabat on September 17, 2017.

== Specifications ==
The length of the single-track circular line, including the branch to the depot, is 5,180 meters, with the elevation of viaducts and stations ranging from 6 to 20 meters. The line features eight covered elevated stations, designated M1 to M8. Three 25-meter articulated train units manufactured by Intamin operate along the line.

Each train has a capacity of 70 passengers and operates at a speed of 46 km/h, with a maximum speed of 70 km/h.
