= Tinapa Resort =

Resort in Cross River State, Nigeria

- Location within Nigeria

General information
- Location: near Calabar, Cross River, Nigeria
- Coordinates: 5.049992°N 8.317423°E
- Opening: 2 April 2007
- Owner: Cross River State

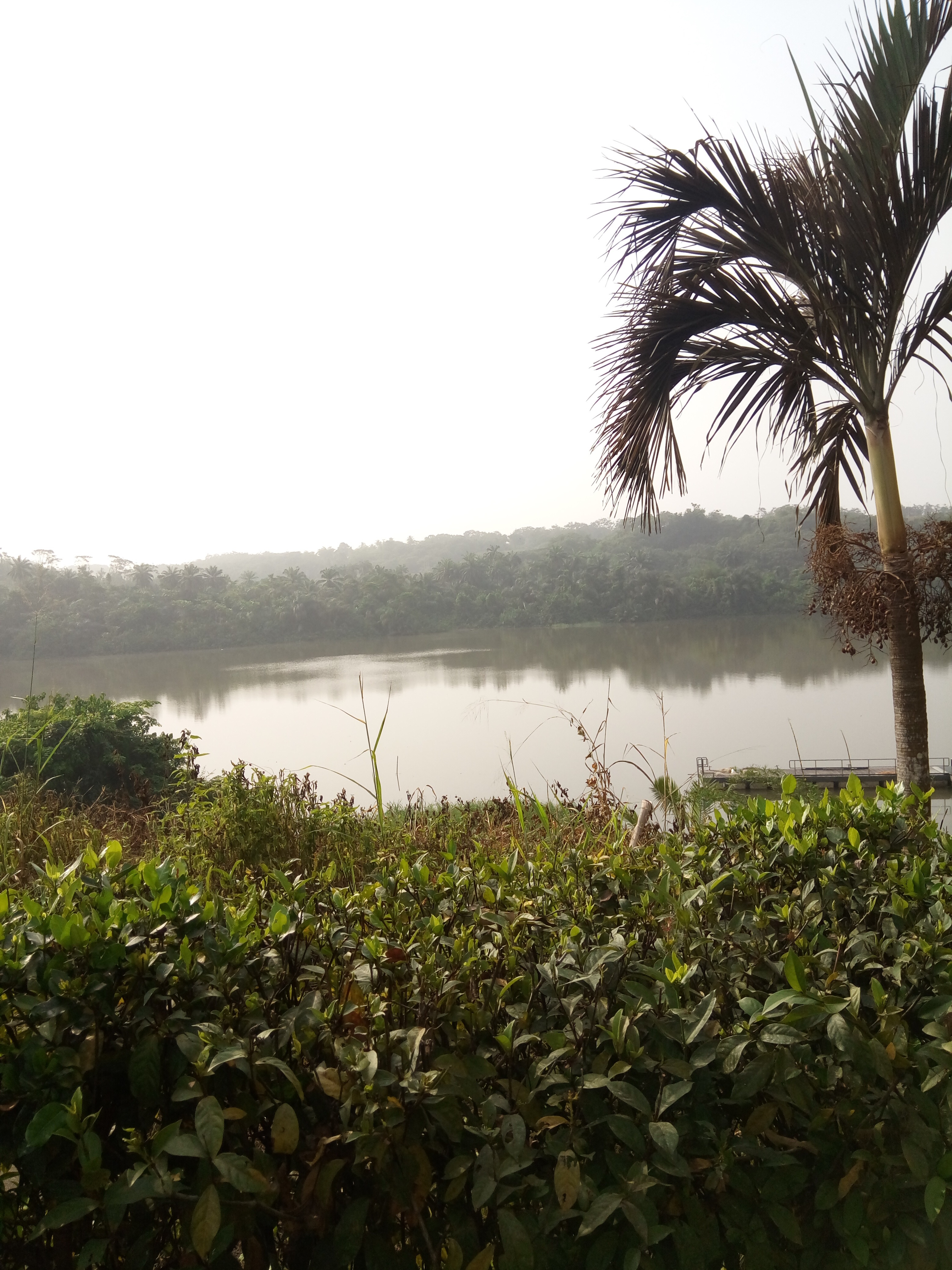
This lake is found at the tinapa resort in Calabar, Cross Rivers State in Nigeria.

Tinapa is a business and leisure resort located North of Calabar municipality, Cross River State, Nigeria associated with the Calabar Free Trade Zone. It was developed in four phases under a Private Public Partnership (PPP) promoted by the Government of Cross River State. The resort is located by the Calabar River, contiguous with the Calabar Free Trade Zone.

== Facilities ==
The Tinapa Free Zone & Resort has facilities for retail and wholesale activities as well as leisure and entertainment. For consumers, the resort sits on approximately 80,000 square metres (860,000 sq ft) of lettable space for retail and wholesale made up of four emporiums of 10,000 square metres (110,000 sq ft) each, smaller shops, and warehouses. An entertainment strip contains a casino, digital cinema, children's arcade, restaurants, a mini amphitheater, a night club and pubs. There is an artificial tidal lake that feeds from the Calabar River, a Water Park / Leisure Land and parking Space for 4,000 cars.

Business facilities include an open exhibition area for trade exhibitions and other events, and a movie production studio commonly called Tinapa Studios. There is a 243-room international three star Hotel. The resort also has a truck terminal and it is powered by an independent power plant.

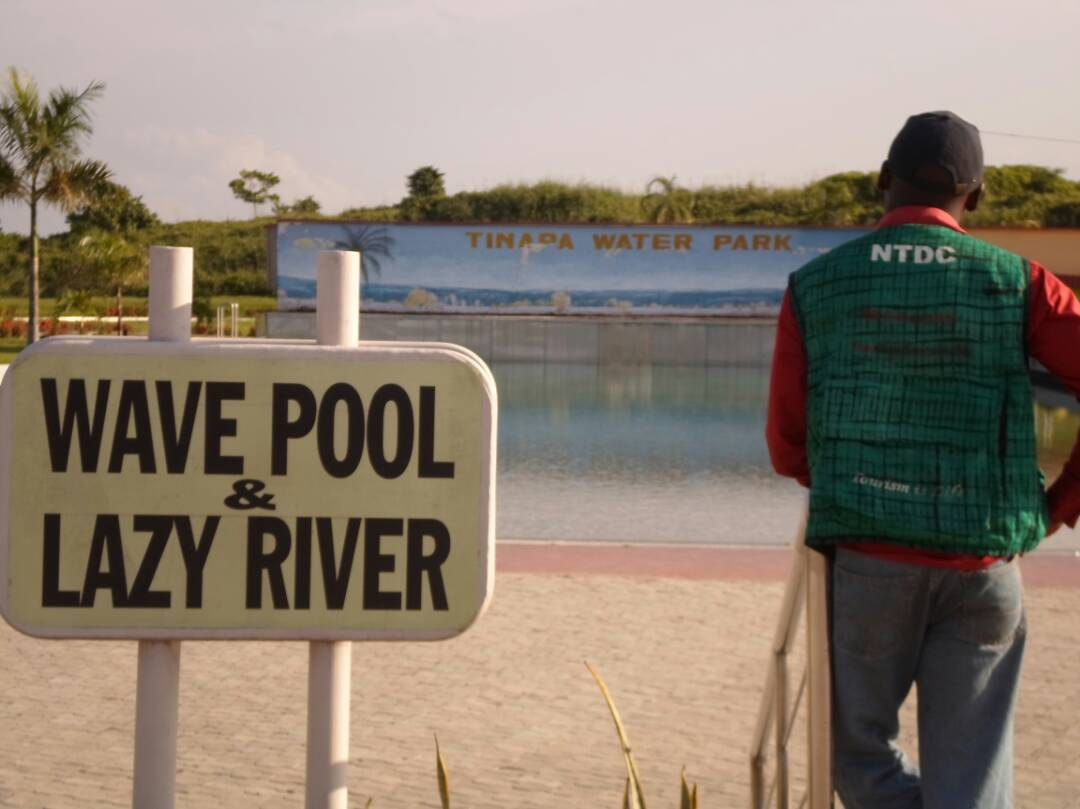
Tinapa Water park Calabar Nigeria

== Project history ==
Tinapa was initiated by Governor Donald Duke as a way to boost business and tourism in the state. Over $350 million was spent on initial development. The first phase of Tinapa Business Resort & Free Zone, Calabar, was commissioned on 2 April 2007.Tinapa is a 10 kilometres (6.2 mi) drive from Calabar by a roundabout route, but the Federal government is building a more direct 2.5 kilometres (1.6 mi) access road to link it with the city.

The legal status of the Tinapa Free Trade zone has been uncertain. It is owned by the Cross River state government, but only the Federal government can operate a free trade zone. Former governor Liyel Imoke appealed to the Federal Government to take a stake in the project, and to remove uncertainty about its status which is hindering investment. He suggested that one approach could be to decouple the leisure facilities from the trading zone. A February 2008 report by ThisDay newspaper said the Federal Government had not yet approved the operating procedures and guidelines. The resort was almost deserted. The few shops that were staffed would not sell their goods out of concern that customs officials would then force them to close. A CNN report in 2010 showed that the complex was still largely empty, while interest payments on the construction cost of the complex were rising. Governor Liyel Imoke told a CNN reporter that the state government was looking for private sector investors who would run the project more efficiently.

A March 2010 report in the Daily Champion was optimistic. The report acknowledged that the project had suffered from bureaucratic delays, that there had been rumors of corruption and project abandonment, with key infrastructure incomplete. However, the report said that 90% of infrastructure and facilities were ready and that shops are selling duty-free goods. It also claimed that the resort was increasingly used for business and government functions, as planned. In September 2010, Imoke said the government was focusing on resuscitating the Tinapa Business and Leisure Resort.

A May 2011 report by the Daily Trust entitled "Tinapa is dying" reported that most of the shops had closed, and the other facilities such as the exhibition space and movie studio had not been used for a long time. The hotel was open but hardly had any guests. Only the water park was busy, since the reporter had visited during a school holiday.

In 2013, the Nigerian Custom Service claimed that the Free Trade Zone was not properly constituted and began charging duty on purchases as they were brought out of the zone. The resort was reported to be moribund and was repaired in 2020 after years of neglect.

== Transport ==
The resort is connected to the Calabar International Convention Centre by the 1.1 kilometres (0.68 mi) Calabar Monorail, built by Intamin, which opened in 2016. In 2017, it was reported that the system was working but was not carrying any passengers.
