= Colossos - Kampf der Giganten =

Wooden roller coaster at Heide Park

- Previously known as Colossos (2001–2016)
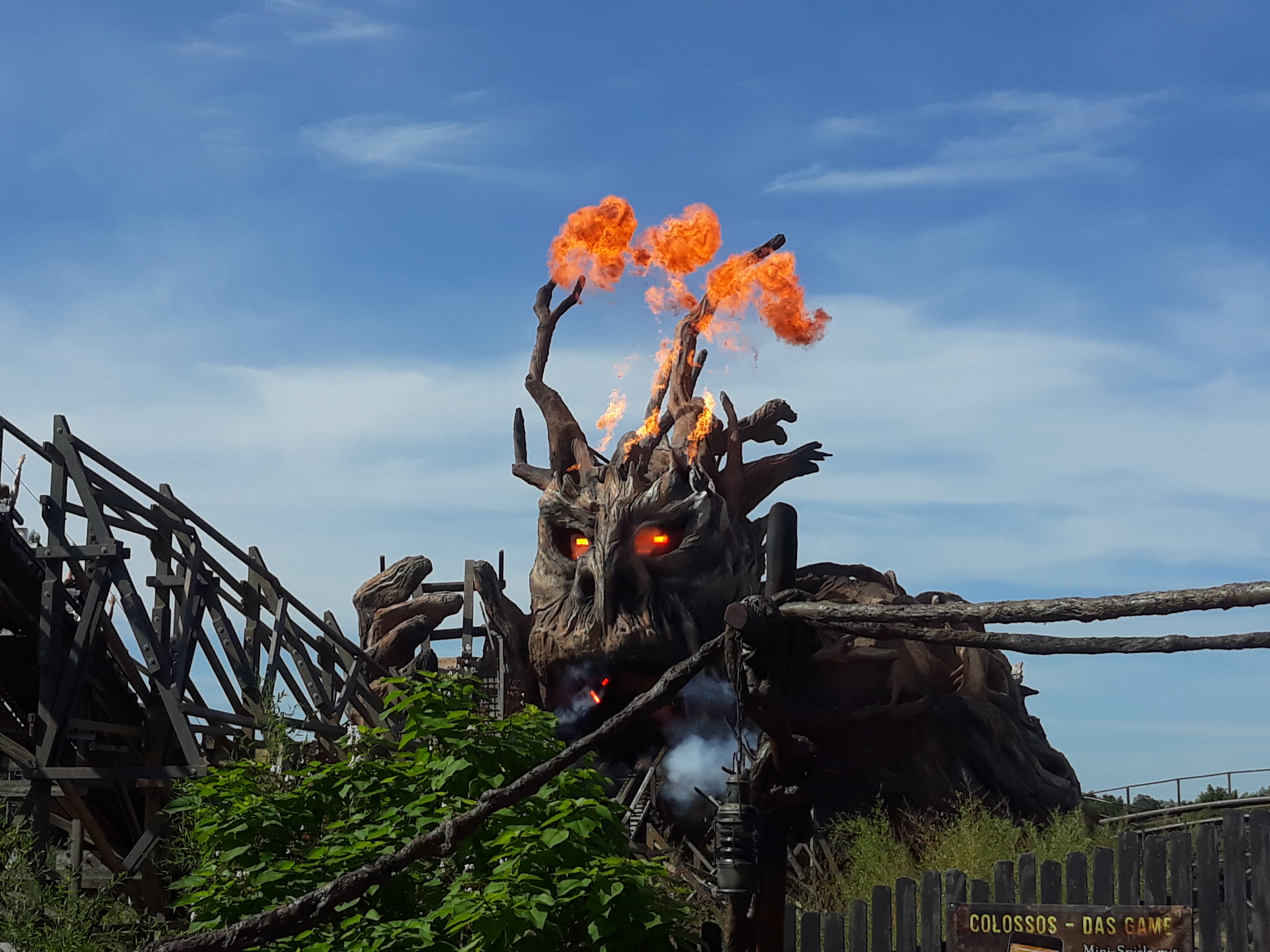

Heide Park
- Location: Heide Park
- Park section: Land der Vergessenen
- Coordinates: 53°01′23″N 9°53′00″E
- Status: Operating
- Opening date: April 13, 2001; reopened April 19, 2019

General statistics
- Type: Wood
- Manufacturer: Intamin
- Designer: Werner Stengel
- Model: Wooden Coaster (prefabricated track)
- Track layout: Out and back
- Lift/launch system: Chain lift hill
- Height: 50.0 m (164.0 ft)
- Drop: 48.5 m (159 ft)
- Length: 1,344 m (4,409 ft)
- Speed: 110 km/h (68 mph)
- Inversions: 0
- Duration: 2:25
- Max vertical angle: 61°
- Capacity: 1,030 riders per hour
- G-force: -1.5 and 4.5
- Height restriction: 55 in (140 cm)
- Colossos - Kampf der Giganten at RCDB

Colossos - Kampf der Giganten, German for Colossos: Battle of the Giants, is a wooden roller coaster located at Heide Park in Soltau, Lower Saxony, Germany. Manufactured by Intamin, the roller coaster opened as simply Colossos in 2001. Unlike traditional wooden coasters, its track was prefabricated, laser-cut in a factory to a high degree of precision. Some of its planks were tightly bonded in multiple layers instead of traditionally nailed together by hand. The roller coaster closed in 2016 due to deteriorating track conditions and reopened in 2019 after refurbishment.

== History ==
The coaster's "plug and play" design sped up construction and reduced labor costs. Three other prefabricated wooden roller coasters have since been built: Balder at Liseberg, El Toro at Six Flags Great Adventure in Jackson, New Jersey, and T Express at Everland in South Korea.

Colossos was the first wooden coaster with magnetic brakes just before the return to station, making its final braking very smooth and comfortable compared to that of coasters with friction claw brakes.

On July 28, 2016, Colossos was shut down and all paths to it were blocked. Heide Park announced that inspections had revealed significant problems with the coaster's track, and that repairs would cost over €10 million.

In early January 2018, Heide Park announced that the entire track surface of Colossos would be replaced and that the ride would reopen for the 2019 summer season. The renovation was expected to cost around €12 million. In late 2018, the ride's new name, logo, and backstory were confirmed. Colossos would become Colossos: Kampf der Giganten in 2019. Within the new theme, Colossus is under attack by a large fire monster and needs the rider‘s energy to vanquish it.

== Awards ==
Golden Ticket Awards: Top wood Roller Coasters
Year									1998	1999
Ranking									–	–
Year	2000	2001	2002	2003	2004	2005	2006	2007	2008	2009
Ranking	–	–	16	11	15	19	23	23	18	18
Year	2010	2011	2012	2013	2014	2015	2016	2017	2018	2019
Ranking	18	29	19	17	24	23	18	34	28	30
Year	2020	2021	2022	2023	2024	2025	2026			
Ranking	N/A	25	25	27 (tie)	34	30	18			

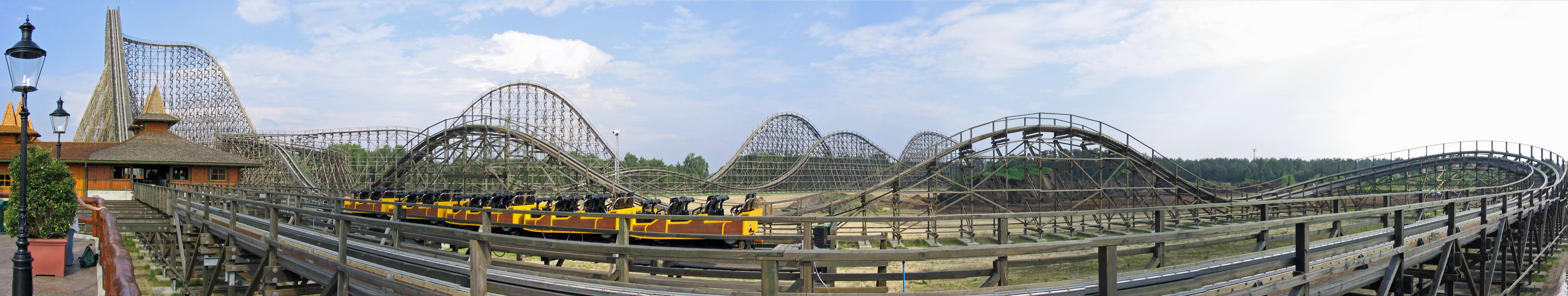
Panoramic of Colossos
