= Bobbahn =

Steel roller coaster at Heide Park

- Previously known as Schweizer Bobbahn
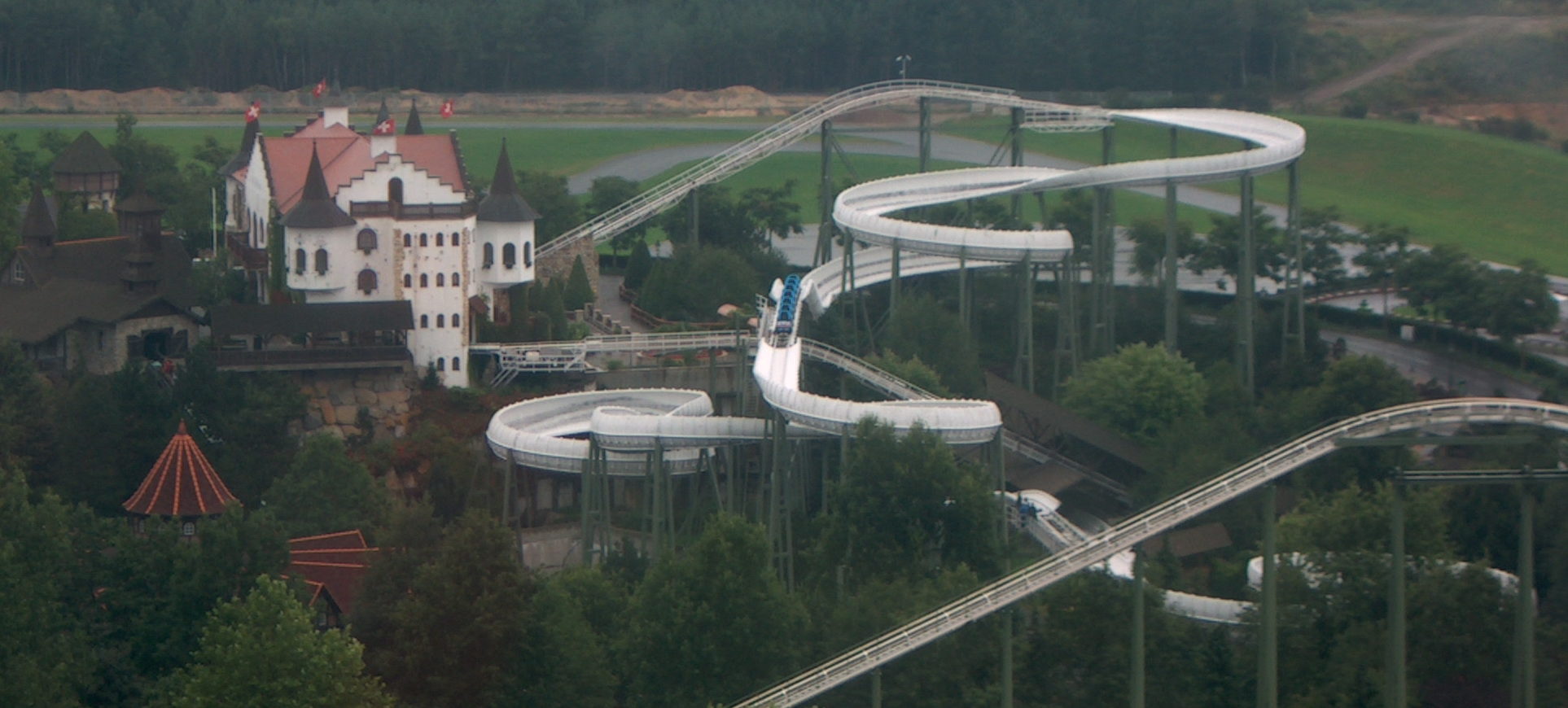

Heide Park
- Location: Heide Park
- Coordinates: 53°01′34.3″N 9°52′49.7″E
- Status: Operating
- Opening date: August 19, 1993

General statistics
- Type: Steel
- Manufacturer: Mack Rides
- Model: Bobsled coaster
- Height: 88.6 ft (27.0 m)
- Length: 3,248 ft (990 m)
- Speed: 32.9 mph (52.9 km/h)
- Duration: 1:40
- Bobbahn at RCDB

Bobbahn (German for 'bobsled') is a steel bobsled roller coaster at Heide Park Resort that opened in 1993 under the name 'Schweizer Bobbahn' (german for 'swiss bobsled'). As of January 2026 it is the highest and longest bobsled roller coaster in operation.

The 990 m long journey begins with a lift hill that transports passengers to a height of 27m. It then travels through numerous very tight bends, some dark ride passages, as well as some block brakes until the final brake is reached. A second lift hill brings the trains back to the level of the station.
