= Heide Park =

Amusement park in Soltau, Germany

Heide Park Resort
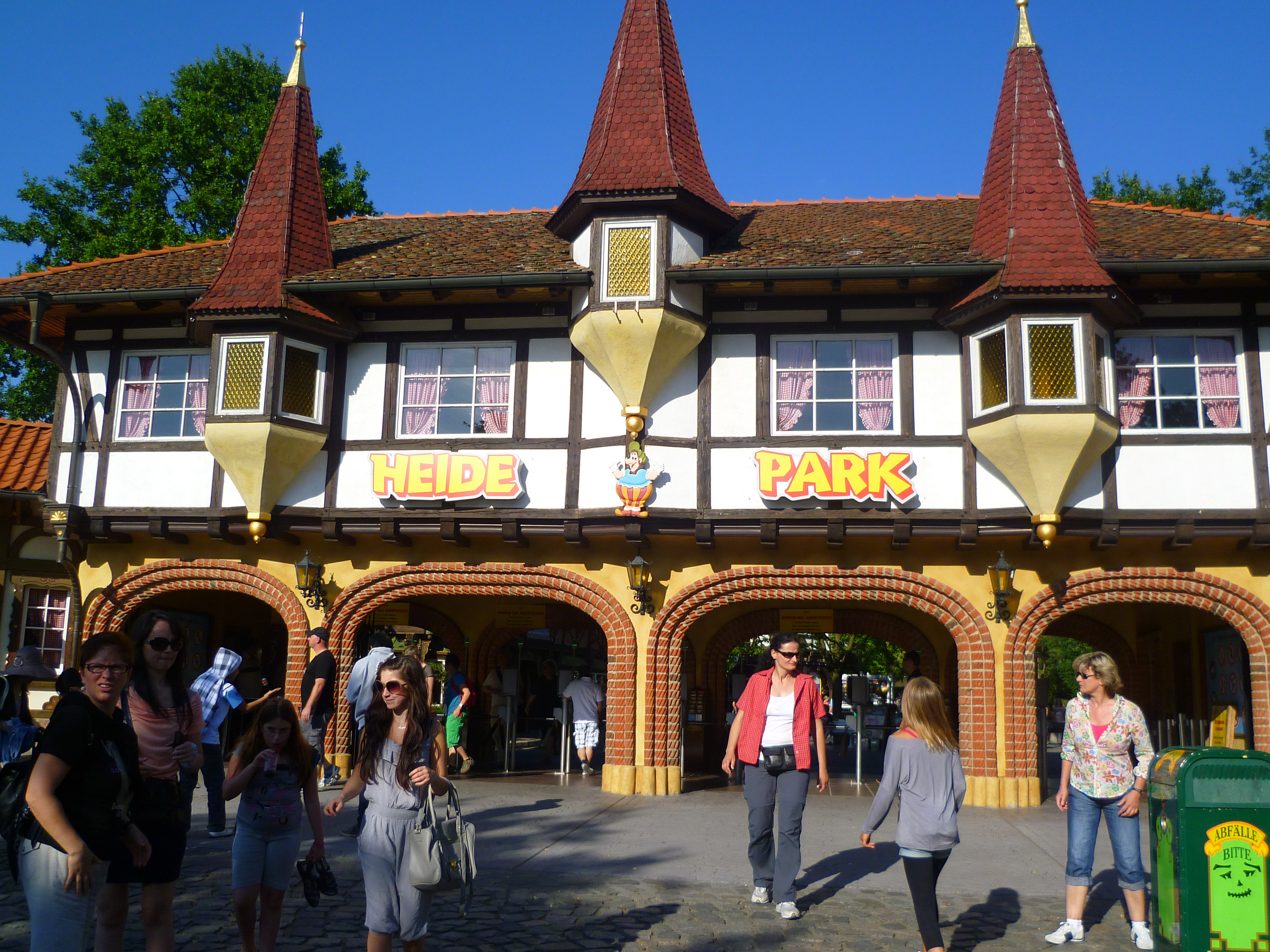
- Entrance in 2012
- Interactive map of Heide Park Resort
- Location: Soltau, Lower Saxony, Germany
- Coordinates: 53°01′41″N 9°52′09″E
- Opened: 19 August 1978
- Owner: LondonMetric Property
- Operated by: Merlin Entertainments
- Slogan: There's Nowhere To Hyde!
- Attendance: 1.68 million (2023)
- Area: 850,000 m^{2} (210 acres)

Attractions
- Total: 41
- Roller coasters: 9
- Water rides: 3
- Website: Official Website

Heide Park Resort, commonly known as Heide Park, is a theme park in Soltau, Lower Saxony, Germany. With an overall area of over 850,000 m^{2} (210 acres), it is the largest amusement park in Northern Germany and among the largest in the country. It operated by the UK-based Merlin Entertainments group.

== History ==
The site originally belonged to the Heidenhof Wildlife Park, which was named after the chapel that was built there in 1350. The park was closed in 1972 following a devastating storm.

The showman Hans-Jürgen Tiemann subsequently bought the land and opened a small amusement park in 1978, with the contractual requirement to maintain Heidenhof Chapel as well as the keeping of native animals. When Heide Park opened on 19 August 1978 it offered six rides: the Monzapiste, the Heide Park Express, the Oldtimerrundkurs, the Floßfahrt (tow boat ride), the Wichtelhausenbahn and the Hochbahn. In its first season, Heide Park had just under 200,000 visitors. 1979 saw the first dolphin show, for which they built a large domed roof a year later.

The location of Heide-Park

The Heide-Dorf (Heath Village), a richly detailed replica of typical buildings from the Lüneburg Heath, was inaugurated in the 1988 season.

In 1996/97, the Dutch section of the park was built, with a windmill and canal at the other end of the park. With the growth of the park, the catchment area grew as well. In the 1990s, up to 2 million people visited Heide-Park each season, with 2.1 million guests in 2001.

In 2002, the UK-based Tussauds Group bought the park and since then attendance decreased to 1.5–1.6 million visitors per annum. Hans-Jürgen Tiemann retained an influence by shares and as an advisory director of the Tussauds Group. In early 2007, the Tussauds Group was merged with Merlin Entertainments and the land was subsequently sold, with Merlin continuing to operate and develop the park.

The park's mascot is a bear called Wumbo. The most recognizable landmark in the park is a 1/3 scale replica of the Statue of Liberty (35 meters tall), it was inaugurated on 4 July 1986 on the 100th anniversary of the original statue. At the end of 2011, the structure was relocated to stand within the roller coaster Colossos.

== Music and events ==
The music played at Heide Park is a combination of commercial tracks, library music and commissioned music. The following composers have had their music played at the park: Graham Smart, Ian Habgood, David Buckley, Crispin Merrell, IMAscore and John Sanderson.

Halloween in October is a special event.

== Heide Park Resort ==
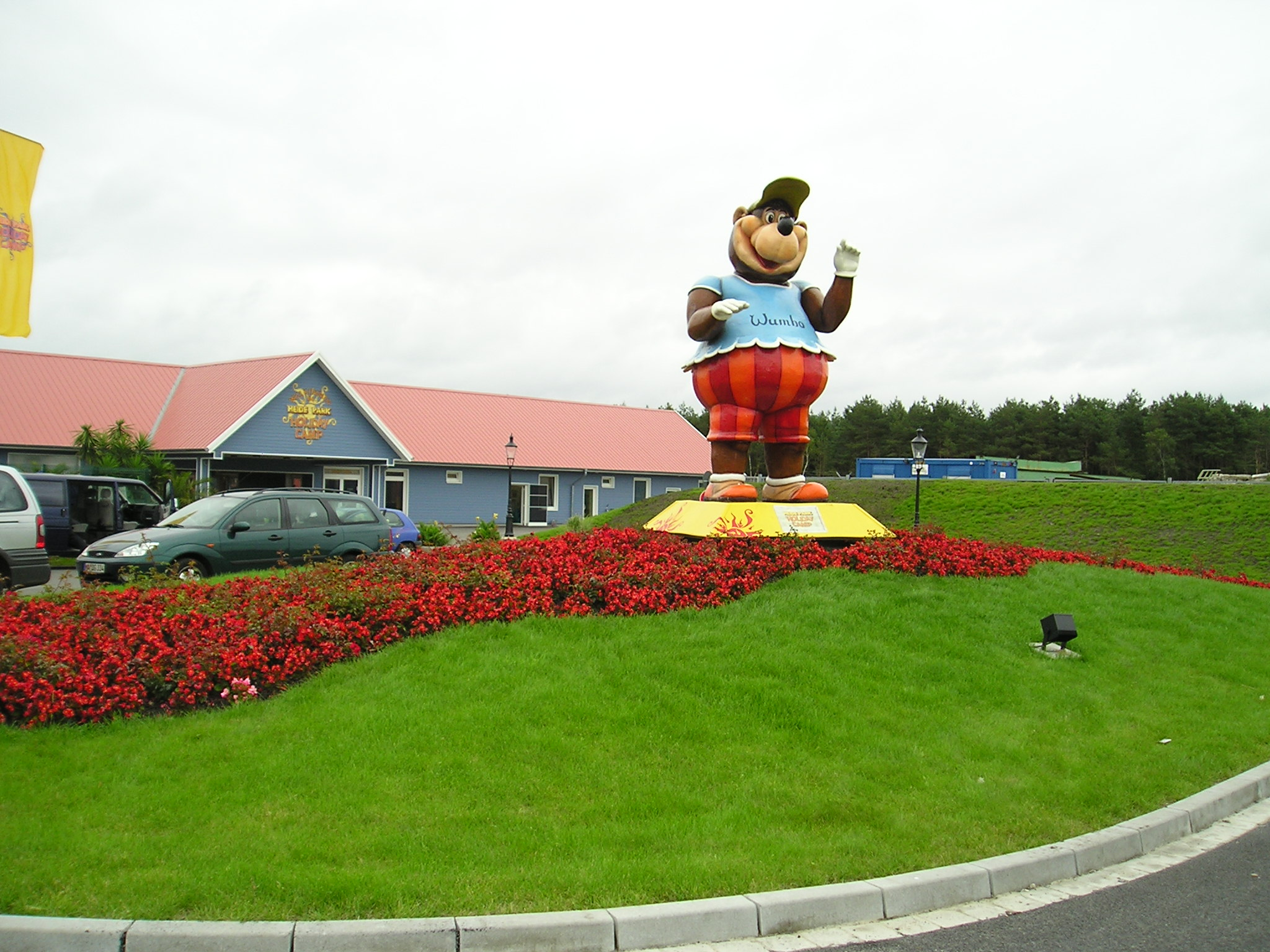
Mascot Mumbo Wumbo at the Holiday Camps

Hotel Port Royal was opened in 2007 with 150 family rooms and 16 suites. There is also a Holiday Camp that opened in 2005 with 81 wooden houses in Caribbean style with a total of 536 beds.

== Park areas ==
The park is divided into five areas.

- Eingang & Ausgang, that features Lower-Saxony style buildings
- Bucht der Piraten, that is mainly themed around the world of pirates
- Transilvanien, with a medieval-style castle on top of the hill surrounded by a forest
- Land der Vergessenen, which hosts the park's award-winning wooden roller coaster Colossos - Kampf der Giganten, as well as the Mayan Village that has many flat rides.
- Exploria

== Attractions ==
Heide Park currently has about 40 rides which are mainly aimed at families but its thrill rides are also very popular. One of the main attractions is Colossos - Kampf der Giganten, a wooden roller coaster, which until the opening of Balder, on 12 April 2003 in the Swedish amusement park Liseberg, was the steepest wooden roller coaster in the world. The latest attraction is the wing coaster Flug der Dämonen. It is Germany's first wing coaster and reaches a maximum of 4 g positive during the ride.

=== Roller coasters ===
Name	Picture	Type	Opened	Max. Height	Length	Max. Speed	Manufacturer
Big Loop		Steel coaster	1983	30 m	706 m	67 km/h	Vekoma
Colossos - Kampf der Giganten		Wooden coaster	2001	52 m	1344 m	110 km/h	Intamin
Desert Race		Launched coaster	2007	19 m	650 m	102 km/h	Intamin
Flug der Dämonen		Wing Coaster	2014	40 m	772 m	100 km/h	Bolliger & Mabillard
Grottenblitz		Powered coaster	1985	6 m	370 m	45 km/h	Mack Rides
Indy-Blitz		Force	2008	4,5 m	128 m	23 km/h	Zierer
Krake		Dive coaster	2011	41m	476 m	103 km/h	Bolliger & Mabillard
Toxic Garden		Vekoma SLC	1999	33 m	689 m	80 km/h	Vekoma
Bobbahn		Bobsled coaster	1993	27 m	990 m	53 km/h	Mack Rides

=== Water rides ===
Name	Picture	Type	Opened in	Max. Height	Ride length	Producer
Drachengrotte		Canal boat ride	1991, renewed 2016	-	unknown	Zierer
Floßfahrt		Tow boat ride	1978	-	unknown	Mack Rides
Käpt'ns Törn		Boat ride	1997	-	unknown	Mack Rides
Mountain Rafting		River rapids ride	1992	-	600 m	Intamin
Wildwasserbahn I		Log flume	1980	12 m	600 m	Mack Rides
ToPiLauLa-Schlacht		Splash Battle	2010	-	150 m	Mack Rides

=== Other attractions ===
Name	Type	Opened in	Producer
Bounty	Pirate Ship	1982	Intamin
Breakdance	Breakdance	1991	HUSS Maschinenfabrik
Dämonen Gruft	Ghost Train	2024	Preston & Barbieri
Dampfkarussell	Carousel	1986	Peter Petz
Drachengrotte	Canal boat ride	1991	Mack Rides
Family Fun	Arcade	2004	–
Floßfahrt	Tow boat ride	1978	Mack Rides
Geschicklichkeitsspiele	Water playground	2004	–
Ghostbusters 5D	Interactive dark ride	2017	Triotech
Gokartbahn	Kart circuit	2004	Homemade
Grobians Wolkenspringer	Red Baron	1985, renewed 2016	Zierer
Heide-Park Express	Narrow-gauge railway	1978, rebuilt 2004	Chance-Morgan
Hicks Himmelsstürmer	Giant Sky Chaser	2016	Zamperla
La Ola	Wave Swinger	2009	Zierer
Magic	Fast spinning ride	1991	Huss
Monorail	Monorail	1985, renewed 1995	Intamin
Nostalgiekarussell	Carousel	1997	Bertazzon
Opa Pig’s Zugfahrt	Train Ride	2018	Metallbau Emmeln
Panoramabahn	Monorail	1978	Mack Rides
Peppa's Ballonfahrt	Carousel	2020	Technical Park
Peppa's Bootsfahrt	Carousel	2018	Metallbau Emmeln
Peppa's Haus	Walkthrough	2018	–
Raffnuss & Taffnuss Wasserflieger	Carousel	2016	Zierer
Schorsch’s Dino Abenteuer	Electric horse riding track	2018	Metallbau Emmeln
Scream	Gyro Drop Tower	2003	Intamin
Screamie	Family Drop Tower	2008	Zierer
Spielhalle	Arcade	1991	–
Trampolin	Trampoline	2004	–
Wasserballschlacht	Water playground	2002	–
Western-Riesenrad	Ferris wheel	2008	Zierer
Westernspielplatz	Playground	2008	–
Wüstenflitzer	Mini Trucks	2015	–

=== Shows ===
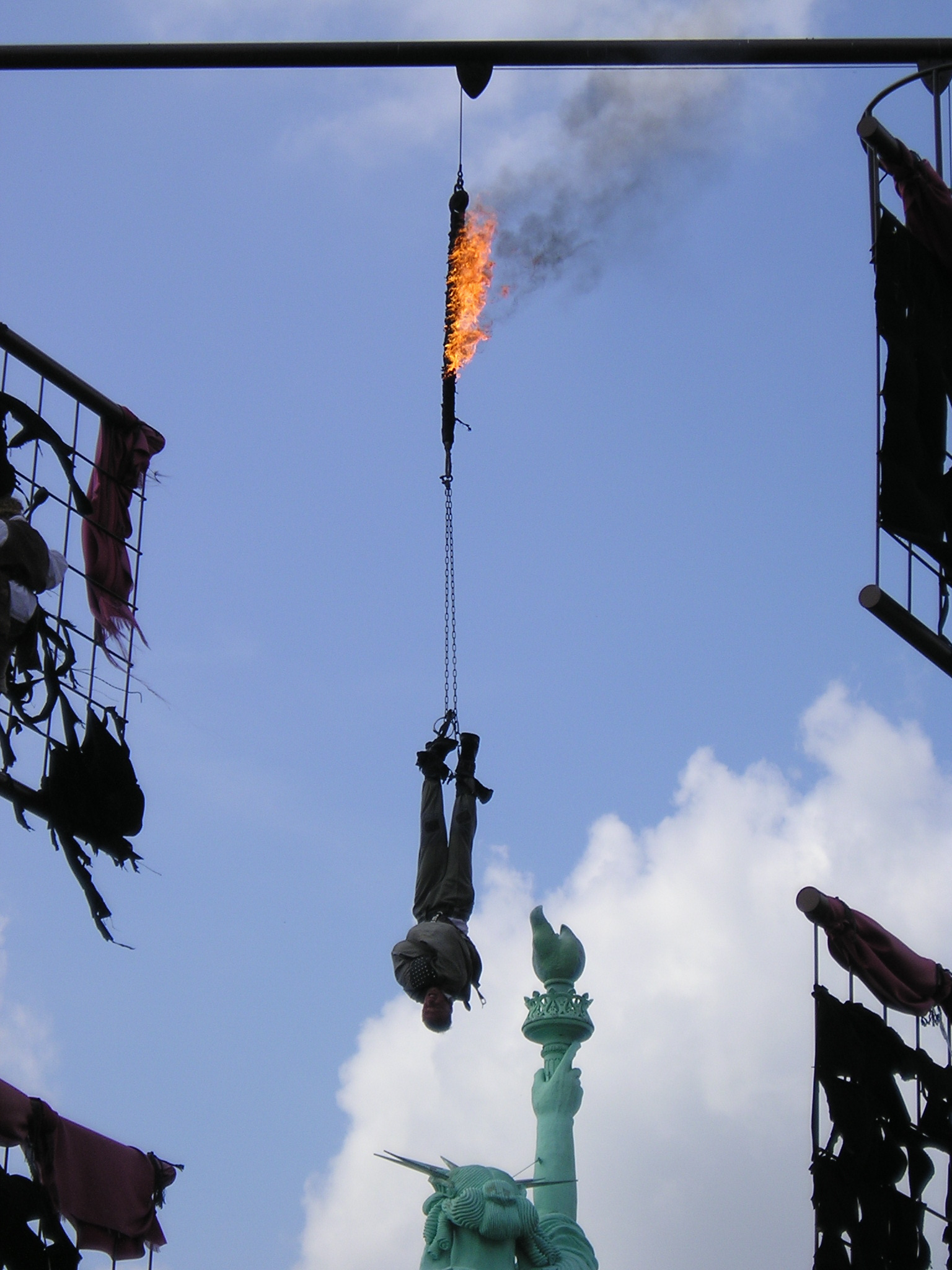
Scene from a former Pirate Show

Five shows are available each day at Heide Park, these are;

- Im Auge des Drachens, a 35-minute pirate show at Pirate Arena that was built in 2010 and seats 1200 people.
- The Movie Maker, an interactive show at Pirate Arena in which selected guests from the audience can produce a film.
- Smilie – It’s Magic, a humoristical magic show at Pirate Arena.
- Time, an artistical journey through time at Pirate Arena.

== Trivia ==
- Heide Park was one of three playable real world parks (with Alton Towers and Blackpool Pleasure Beach) added to RollerCoaster Tycoon in the Loopy Landscapes expansion pack.
- In 2001, one episode of Die Rettungsflieger was set in Heide Park.

== Gallery ==
Main gallery: Heide Park at WikiCommons

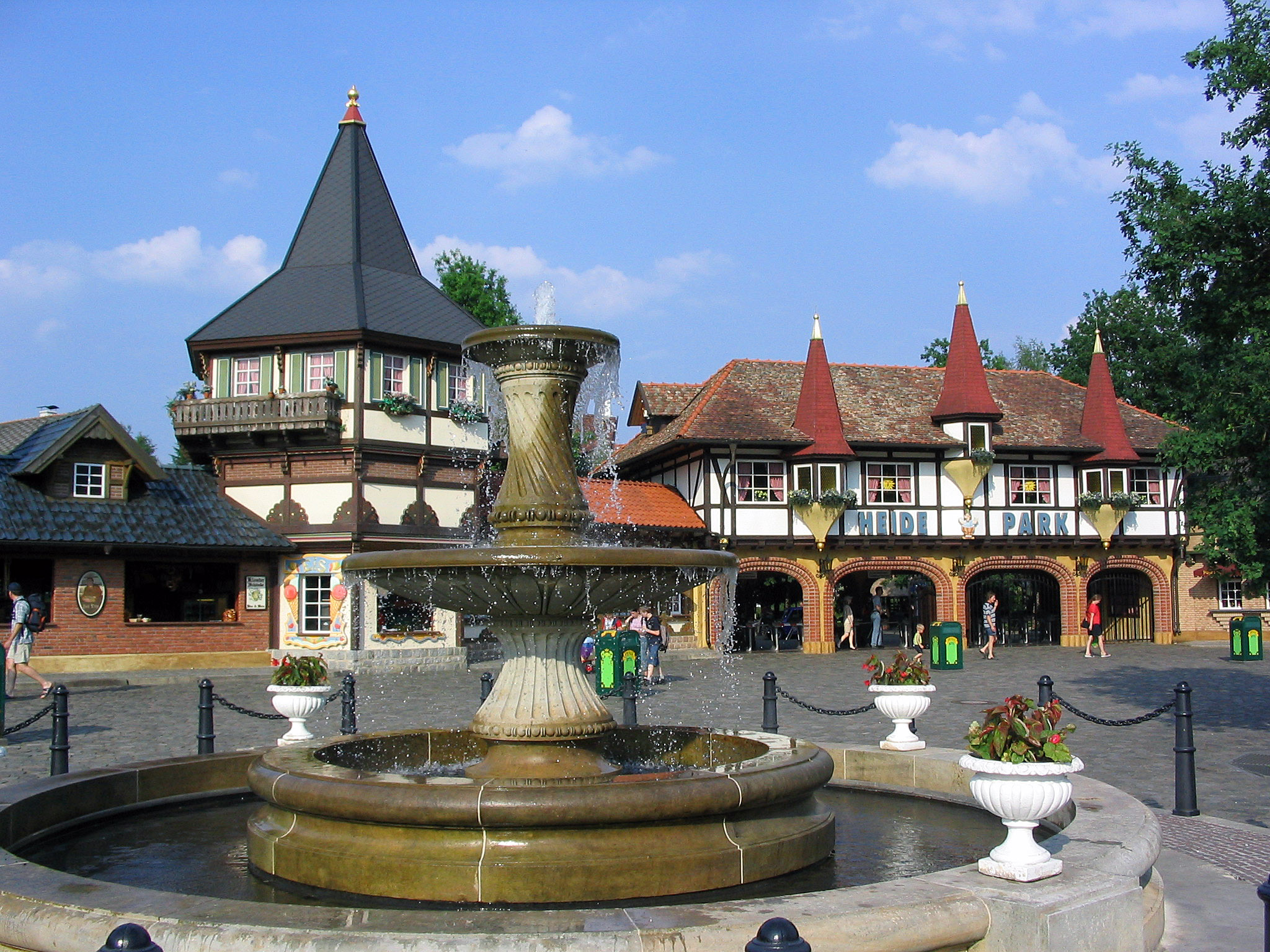
Heide-Park Entrance

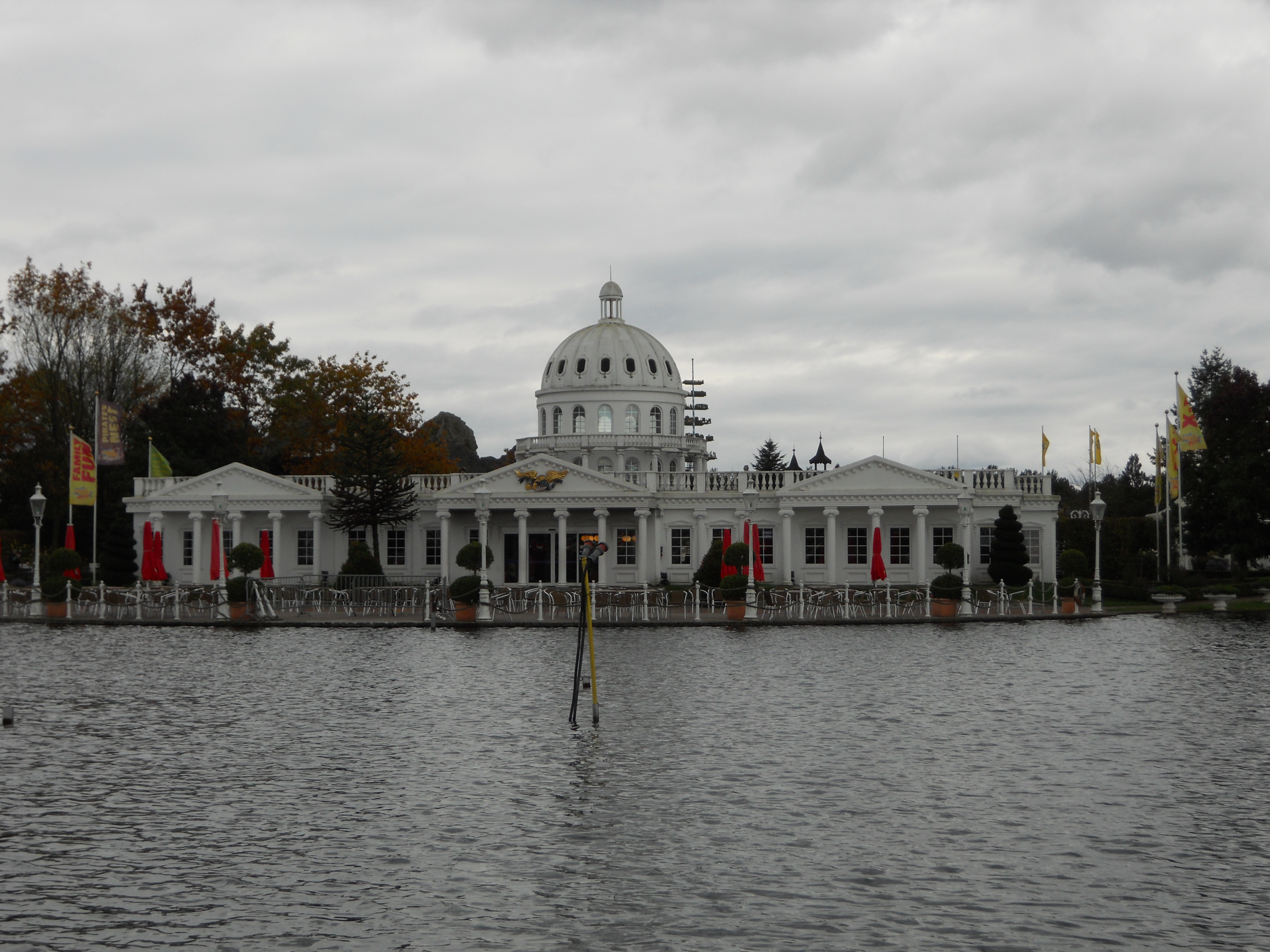
Kapitol

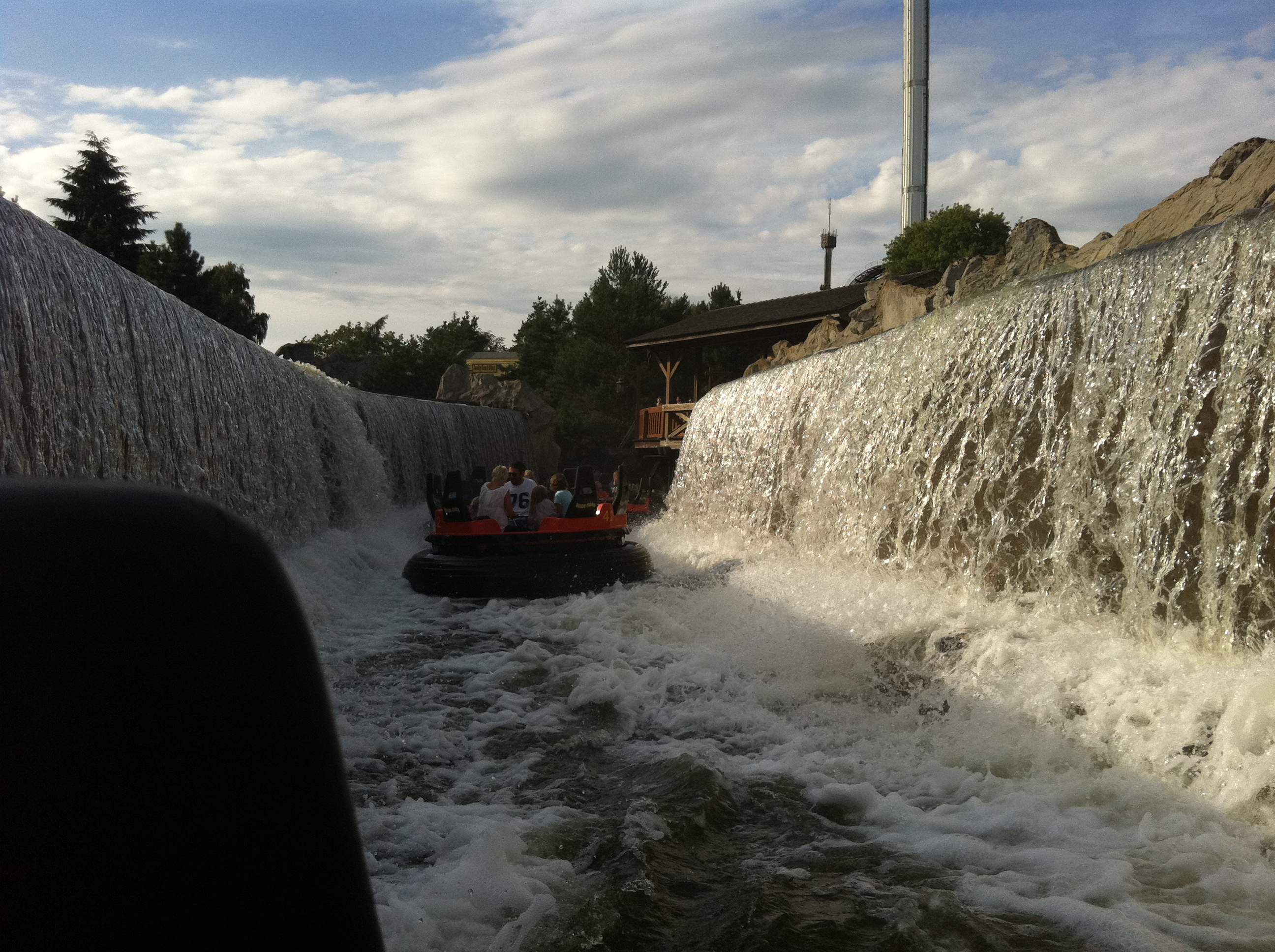
Mountain Rafting

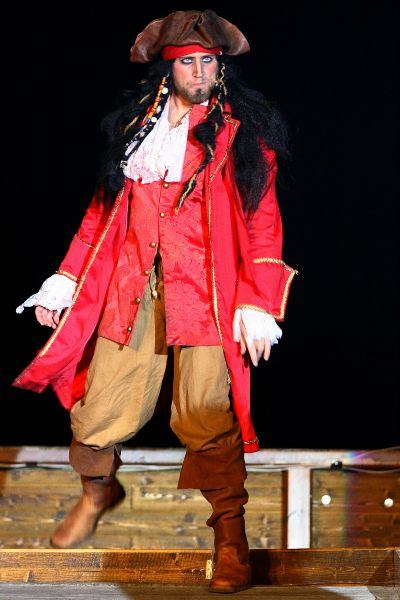
Pirate in 2007

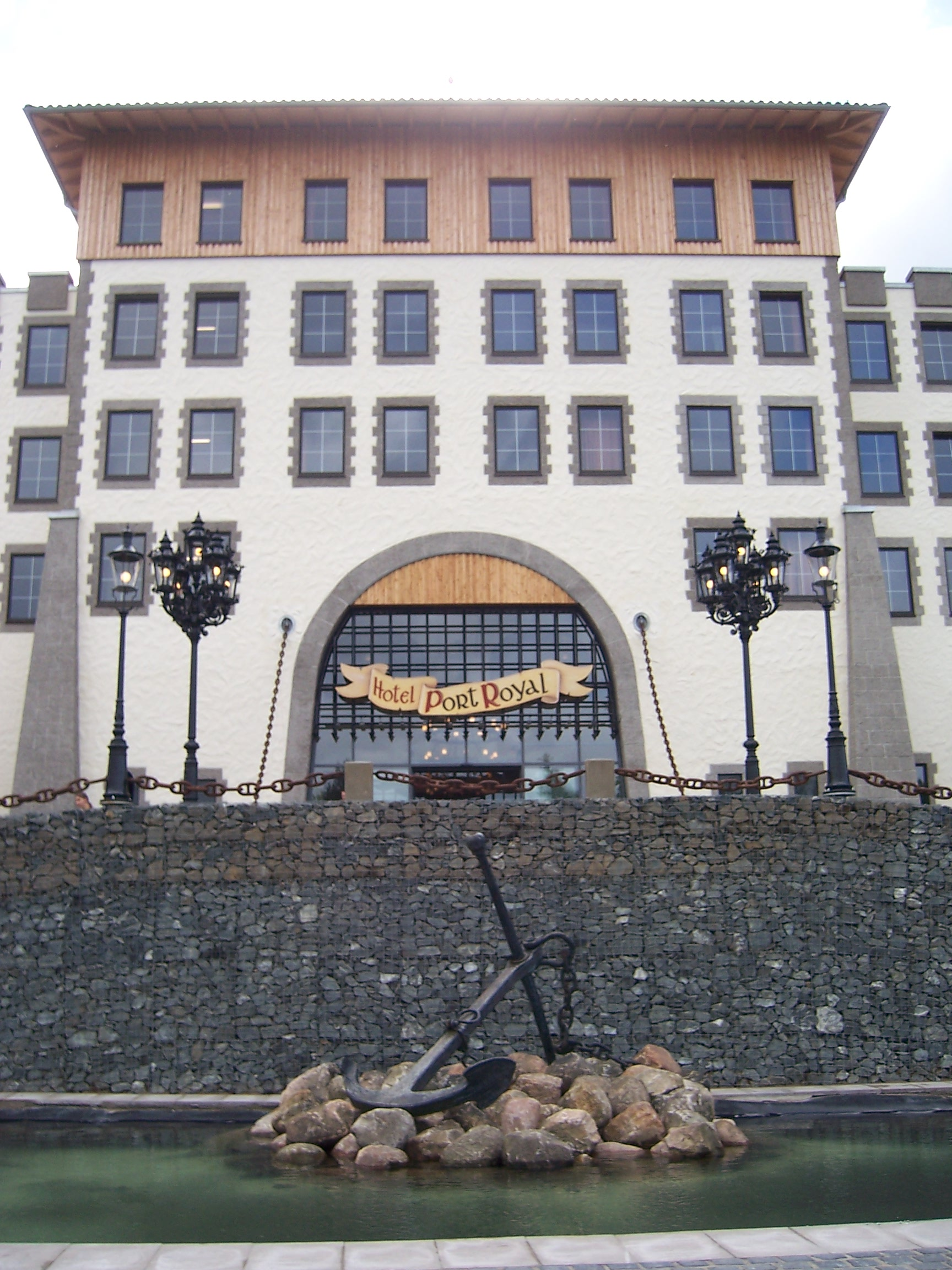
Entrance of Hotel Port Royal
