= Coyote Wash (Whiskey Creek tributary) =

Waterway in Apache County, Arizona

Coyote Wash is a tributary stream of Whiskey Creek in the watershed of the San Juan River and Colorado River. The confluence with Whiskey Creek lies within the Canyon de Chelly National Monument. It is entirely in Apache County, Arizona. Its mouth is located at an elevation of 7,080 feet (2,160 m) at its confluence with Whiskey Creek. Its source is at an elevation of 7,096 feet (2,163 m) at the confluence of Crystal Creek and Cattail Wash 36°04′52″N 109°08′56″W.
