= Qujiang New District =

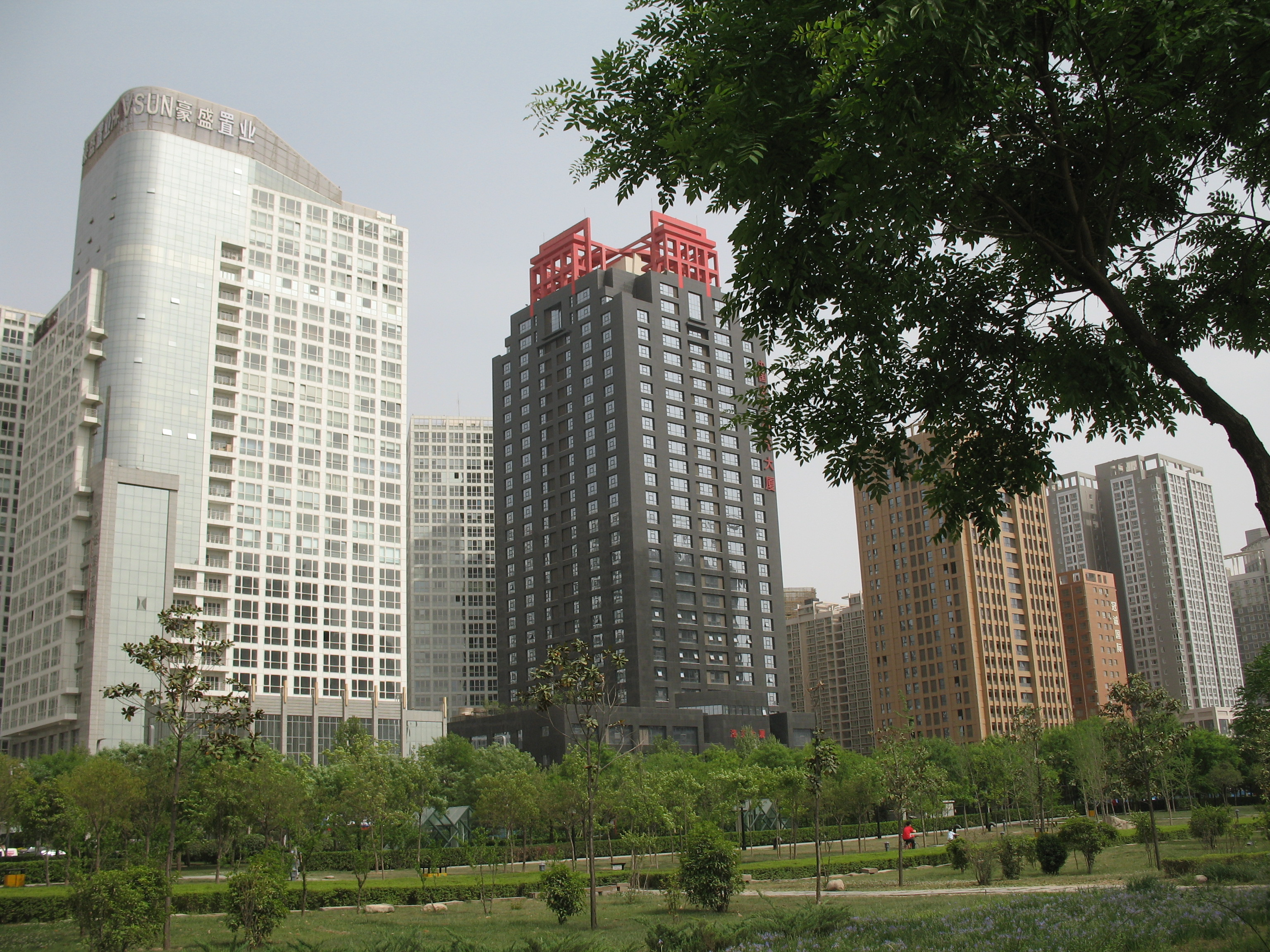

- Location within China
- Coordinates: 34°11′37″N 108°57′18″E
- Country: China
- Province: Shaanxi
- Prefecture-level city: Xi'an
- District: Yanta District

Qujiang New District (Chinese: 曲江新区; pinyin: Qǔjiāng xīnqū) is located in Yanta District, Xi'an city, Shaanxi province, China. It is located in the southeast of Xi'an, Shaanxi, China. It serves as an area for the development of Xi'an as an international metropolis and was designated a national-level cultural industry demonstration area by the Ministry of Culture. The core area of Qujiang New District covers 51.5 square kilometres. The district also extends its influence to the Daming Palace site protection area, Xi'an City Wall scenic area, Lintong National Tourism and Leisure Resort, and Daoism cultural exhibition area, contributing to the development of the cultural tourism industry.

== History ==
Qujiang New District was first created as a tourism district called Xi'an Qujiang Resort in 1993. The site originally had an area of 15.88 square kilometres. It has been expanded to 47 square kilometres. The resort became Qujiang New District ten years after its establishment. It is now an economic centre with arts, luxury shopping, tourism and 5-star hotels (e.g. Westin, W Hotels in Xi'an).

The district is home to a large number of tourism attractions and top businesses. It is also the most expensive area for residential properties in Xi'an.

- Qujiang Ocean World
- Shaanxi Television Tower
- Tang Paradise
- Giant Wild Goose Pagoda

== Geography ==
Located in the southern suburbs of Xi'an, Qujiang New District covers an area of approximately 51 square kilometers. Historically, the area served as a cultural and leisure destination for Tang emperors and officials. Before its redevelopment, Qujiang was characterised by undeveloped land and numerous urban villages and was home to a large population of migrant workers attracted by low rents. Following redevelopment, the area's historical identity has increasingly been associated with its former role as a retreat for emperors.

Qujiang New District was the location of the Qujiang Royal Garden during the Tang dynasty. Its historical and cultural sites include Qujiang Pool, the Giant Wild Goose Pagoda, Tang Paradise, the Mausoleum of Qin Er Shi and the Tang city wall. Today, Qujiang New District is designated as a national cultural industry demonstration area and includes a 5A-rated scenic area and ecological zones. The district's infrastructure development takes into account the schools to the north and the surrounding residential areas. Development plans include the integration of science and education, the interpretation of history and culture, and the integration of cultural, scientific and educational facilities. These initiatives aim to improve the ecological environment and develop a 15-minute living circle within Qujiang New District. Plans also include the development of a park community with multifunctional spaces for fitness, recreation, and leisure, serving nearby residents and students. The area is also served by two metro lines.

The area's food culture dates back to the Zhou and Qin dynasties and developed further during the Tang dynasty. It reflects historical culinary practices and cultural traditions associated with these periods.

== Economy ==
Qujiang New District has received investment in cultural and economic development. In May 2006, it was designated a national cultural industry demonstration base. In August 2007, it was included in the first group of national cultural industry demonstration parks. In May 2008, the district received the Chinese Cultural Industry Innovation Award.

As part of its development, Qujiang New District planned and established several cultural industry parks and zones, including a publishing and media industrial park, an exhibition industrial park, an international cultural and creative park, an animation and game industrial park, a cultural and entertainment industrial park, and an international cultural and sports leisure zone. By 2013, Qujiang New District and its surrounding development area had more than 1,000 cultural enterprises and approximately 100,000 employees. The annual output value of the cultural industry reached 5 billion yuan.

Rural e-commerce also expanded in Shaanxi during this period. In 2017, Taobao Villages, which are rural e-commerce centres where businesses primarily use online platforms to sell goods, were reported in Shaanxi for the first time. Under Alibaba's criteria, a village qualified for the designation if its annual e-commerce transactions exceeded 10 million yuan and it had more than 100 online stores or at least 10% of households engaged in e-commerce.

Since construction began in 1996, Qujiang New District had invested 3 billion yuan in infrastructure, with municipal facilities largely completed across 10 square kilometres. Residential, tourism and commercial facilities were also developed along the roads. The district subsequently attracted domestic and international investors and visitors.

Under the concept of integrating culture, science and education, Qujiang New District incorporated research and educational resources from universities in Xi'an. Its development was organised into four areas: a cultural and commercial area, a scientific and technological research and development area, a cultural and educational area, and a medical and healthcare area.

== See also ==
- Shaanxi
