= Bobcat Hills (Greenlee County, Arizona) =

Ridge of hills

Bobcat Hills are a ridge of hills in Greenlee County, Arizona. Its highest point is a hill of 4,791 feet at 32°34′03″N 109°07′44″W.
