= Summit Hills (New Mexico) =

Summit Hills is a range of hills in Hidalgo County, New Mexico. Its tallest summit is 4,862 feet / 1,482 meters at 32°30′19″N 108°58′23″W.
