= Liyel Imoke =

Nigerian politician (born 1961)

Liyel Imoke CON

Senator
- In office 1992–1993

Federal Minister of Power and Steel
- In office July 2003 – January 2007

Governor of Cross River State
- In office 29 May 2007 – May 2015
- Preceded by: Donald Duke
- Succeeded by: Ben Ayade

Personal details
- Born: 10 July 1961 (age 65)

Liyel Imoke CON (born 10 July 1961) is a Nigerian politician who served as the governor of Cross River State, Nigeria from 29 May 2007 till 29 May 2015. He is a member of the African Democratic Congress (ADC).

== Background ==
Liyel Imoke hails from Agbo tribe in Abi Local Government Area of Cross River State.

His father, Dr. Samuel Imoke, was a medical doctor who became a cabinet minister and leader of Parliament in the former Eastern Region. Liyel Imoke was born on 10 July 1961 at Ibadan in the then Western Region of Nigeria.

Liyel Imoke attended Mary Knoll College, Okuku, Ogoja and then the Federal Government College Enugu (1973–1977) for his secondary education. He obtained a bachelor's degree in International Relations and Economics at the University of Maryland in the United States in 1982.

He then studied law at the University of Buckingham, England, gaining an LLB degree in 1985, and then studied at the American University in Washington, D.C., where he gained a master's degree in Law. He completed his legal education at the Nigerian Law School, Lagos, in 1988.

Liyel Imoke practiced law in Washington, D. C. and Lagos between 1982 and 1992. He was principal partner of Liyel Imoke and Co., Lagos.

== Early political career ==
In 1992, Liyel Imoke was elected a Senator of the Federal Republic of Nigeria at the age of 30 during the Ibrahim Babangida transition government. His term ended with the dissolution of the government in November 1993 by the military regime headed by General Sani Abacha.

Between 1993 and 1999, he was a Managing Consultant at Telsat Communications, Lagos; Executive Chairman of Value Mart Nigeria, Lagos, and Executive Director of Trident Petroleum and Gas, Lagos.

In 1999, he was appointed a Special Adviser on Public Utilities by President Olusegun Obasanjo. He was Executive Chairman of the Special Board charged with winding down the Oil Minerals Producing Areas Development Commission. He was Chairman of Technical Board of the National Electric Power Authority.

== Minister of Power and Steel ==
In July 2003, Liyel Imoke was appointed Federal Minister of Power and Steel, and for a while was also Federal Minister of Education. Imoke implemented reforms laid out in the Nigerian Power Sector Reform Act of 2005, leading to establishment of the Nigerian Electricity Regulatory Commission (NERC), the Rural Electrification Agency (REA) and the unbundling of the National Electric Power Authority (NEPA).

In 2008, the House of Representatives set up a panel to look into how $16 billion for the National Integrated Power Project (NIPP) was disbursed, asking for testimony by Liyel Imoke and Olusegun Agagu, who had also served as Minister of Power and Steel. The panel cleared Imoke of wrongdoing. In July 2008 the Economic and Financial Crimes Commission said that Liyel Imoke was under investigation. Imoke had lost his constitutional immunity after his election as governor of Cross River state had been annulled.

== Governor of Cross River State ==
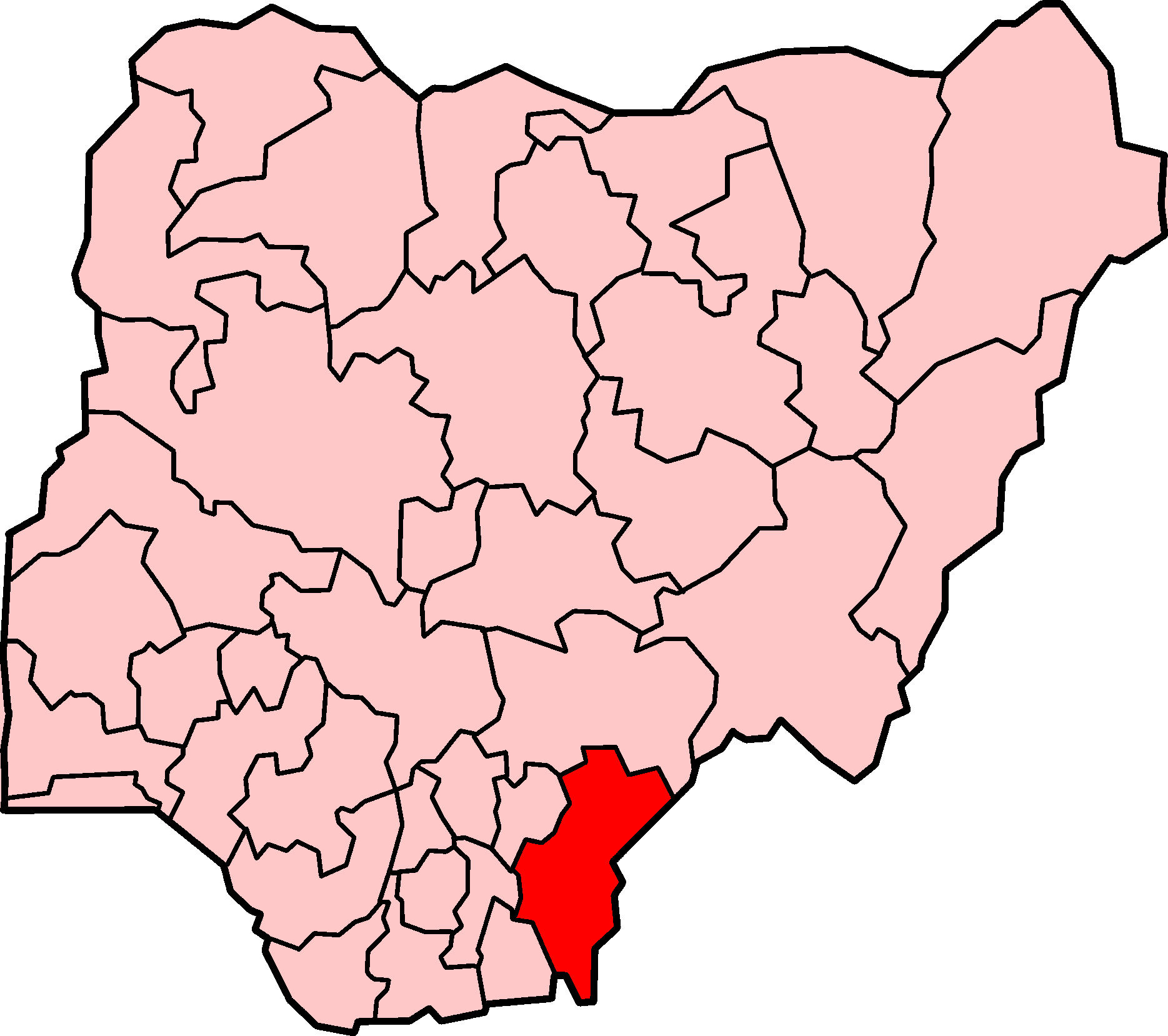
Cross River State in Nigeria

In April 2007, Liyel Imoke successfully ran for governor of Cross River State under the People's Democratic Party (PDP). He was sworn in on 29 May 2007. However, the election was annulled by an Election Appeal Tribunal in July 2008. He won a fresh election held on 23 August 2008. He also won the 2011 Cross River State gubernatorial election.

== See also ==
- List of governors of Cross River State
