= Natural areas in Nigeria =

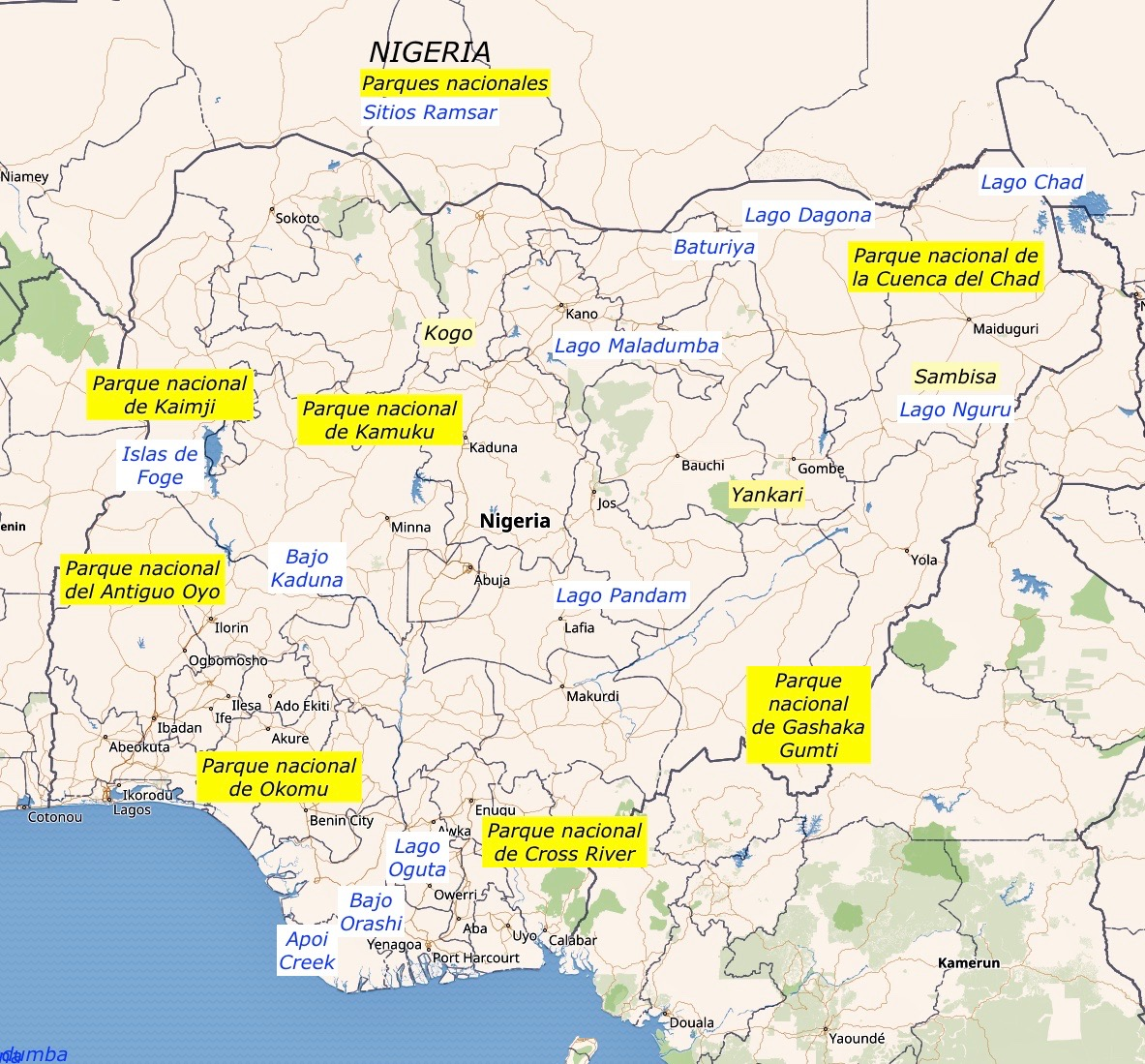
Map of Nigeria's national parks and Ramsar sites from Wikimaps

Natural areas in Nigeria include:

== National parks ==
- Chad Basin National Park
- Cross River National Park
- Gashaka Gumti National Park
- Kainji National Park
- Kamuku National Park
- Okomu National Park
- Old Oyo National Park
- Yankari National Park

== Forest reserves ==
- Afi River Forest Reserve
- Akure Forest Reserve
- Akure Ofosu Forest Reserve
- Edumanom Forest Reserve
- Gujba Forest Reserve
- Idanre Forest Reserve
- Ise Forest Reserve
- Ngel Nyaki Forest Reserve
- Oba Hills Forest Reserve
- Okeluse Forest Reserve
- Okomu Forest Reserve
- Oluwa Forest Reserve
- Omo Forest Reserve
- Sambisa Forest
- Emure forest reserve

== Game reserves in Nigeria and their location ==
- Borgu Game Reserve, Niger State
- Falgore Game Reserve, Kano State
- Kashimbila Game Reserve, Taraba State
- Ohosu Game Reserve, Edo State
- Yankari Game Reserve, Bauchi State
- Zugurma Game Reserve, Niger State,

== Ramsar Convention (internationally important wetlands) ==
- Lake Chad
- Hadejia-Nguru wetlands

== Other ==
- Lekki Conservation Centre
- Erwa Nature Reserve
- Becheve Nature Reserve, Obudu plateau, Obanliku, Cross River
- Somorika Oriakpe Mountain, Somorika, Edo
- Andoni Elephant Sanctuary, Rivers State
