= Kainji =

Kainji may refer to several locations in Nigeria:

- Kainji Lake
- Kainji Dam
- Kainji National Park

It is also used to refer to a group of languages spoken around and to the east of the lake:

- Kainji languages
