= List of Ramsar sites in Nigeria =

Wetlands of international importance in Nigeria

Ramsar sites in Nigeria are wetlands designated as being of international importance under the Ramsar Convention. Nigeria became a contracting party to the convention on 2 February 2001. As of August 2026, Nigeria had 18 Ramsar sites covering a total area of 1,109,169 ha (11,091.69 km^{2}; 4,282.53 sq mi).

== Sites ==
The following list uses the official names and areas recorded by the Ramsar Convention Secretariat.

Ramsar sites in Nigeria
Site	State or states	Area (ha)
Ado-Awaye (Iyake) Suspended Lake Wetland	Oyo	165.3
Apoi Creek Forests	Bayelsa	29,213
Arinta Waterfall	Ekiti	181.4
Baturiya Wetland	Jigawa	101,095
Dagona Sanctuary Lake	Yobe	344
Ebute Oni coastal wetland	Ogun	102.6
Foge Islands	Kebbi and Niger	4,229
International Institute of Tropical Agriculture (IITA)	Oyo	53
Lake Chad Wetlands in Nigeria	Borno	607,354
Lower Kaduna–Middle Niger Floodplain	Niger and Kwara	229,054
Maladumba Lake	Bauchi	1,860
Nguru Lake (and Marma Channel) complex	Jigawa and Yobe	58,100
Oguta Lake	Imo	572
Ogoni Mangrove Wetland	Rivers	31,700
Osun-Oshogbo Sacred Grove	Osun	53.9
Pandam and Wase Lakes	Plateau	19,742
Upper Orashi Forest	Rivers	25,165
Yemoji Lake Ijebu Ode	Ogun	184.1

== See also ==
- List of Ramsar sites
- List of national parks of Nigeria
- Protected areas of Nigeria
