= NNPS =

NNPS is an acronym that may refer to:

- Newport News Public Schools, a school system in Virginia, United States
- Nigeria National Park Services, the government agency responsible for managing Nigeria's national parks
- Nuclear Power School, also known as the Navy Nuclear Power School, a school in South Carolina, United States
