= Kainji National Park =

National park in Nigeria

- IUCN category II (national park)
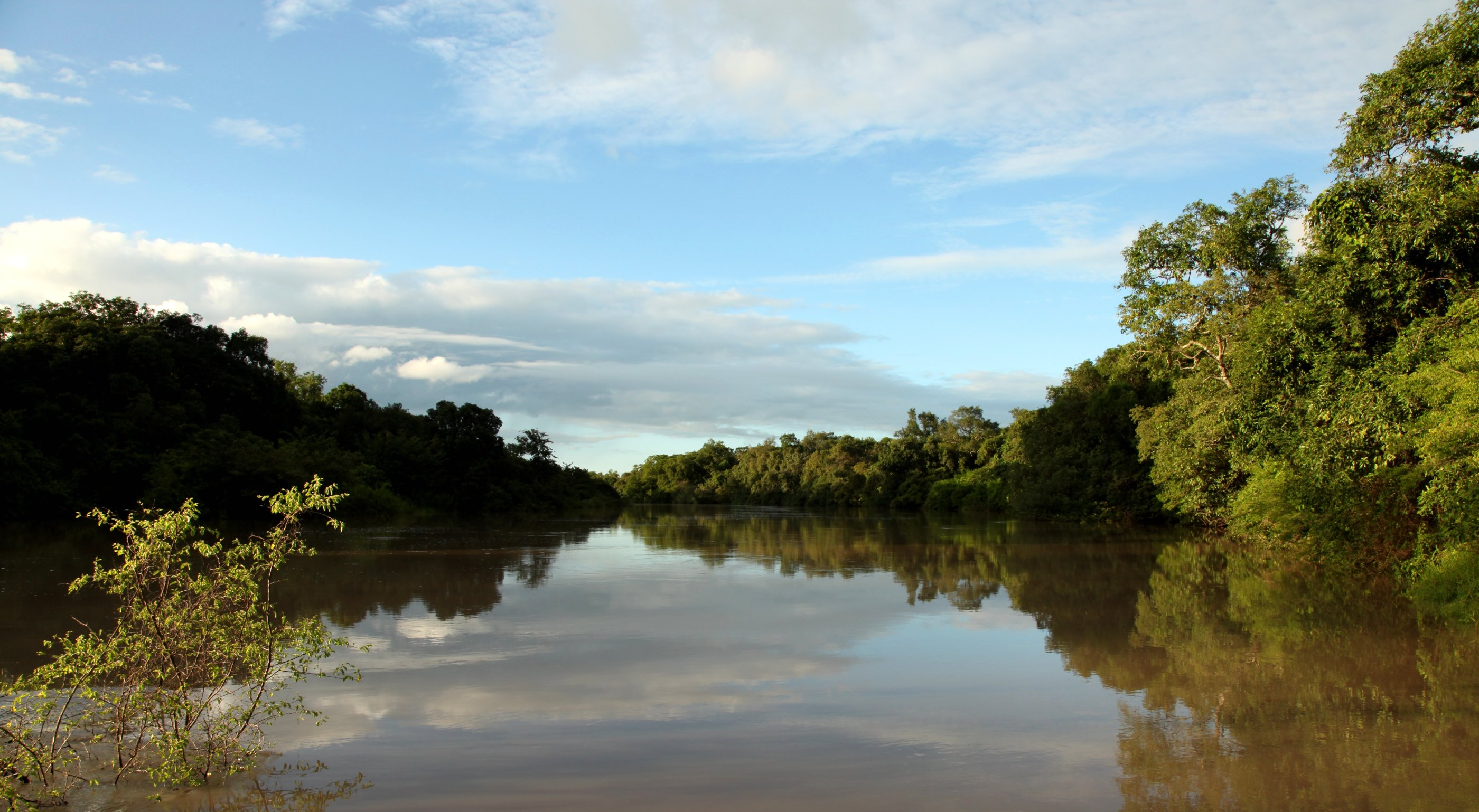

- Location within Nigeria
- Location: Niger State and Kwara State, Nigeria
- Coordinates: 10°22′06″N 4°33′17″E
- Area: 5,340.82 km^{2} (2,062.10 sq mi)
- Established: 1978

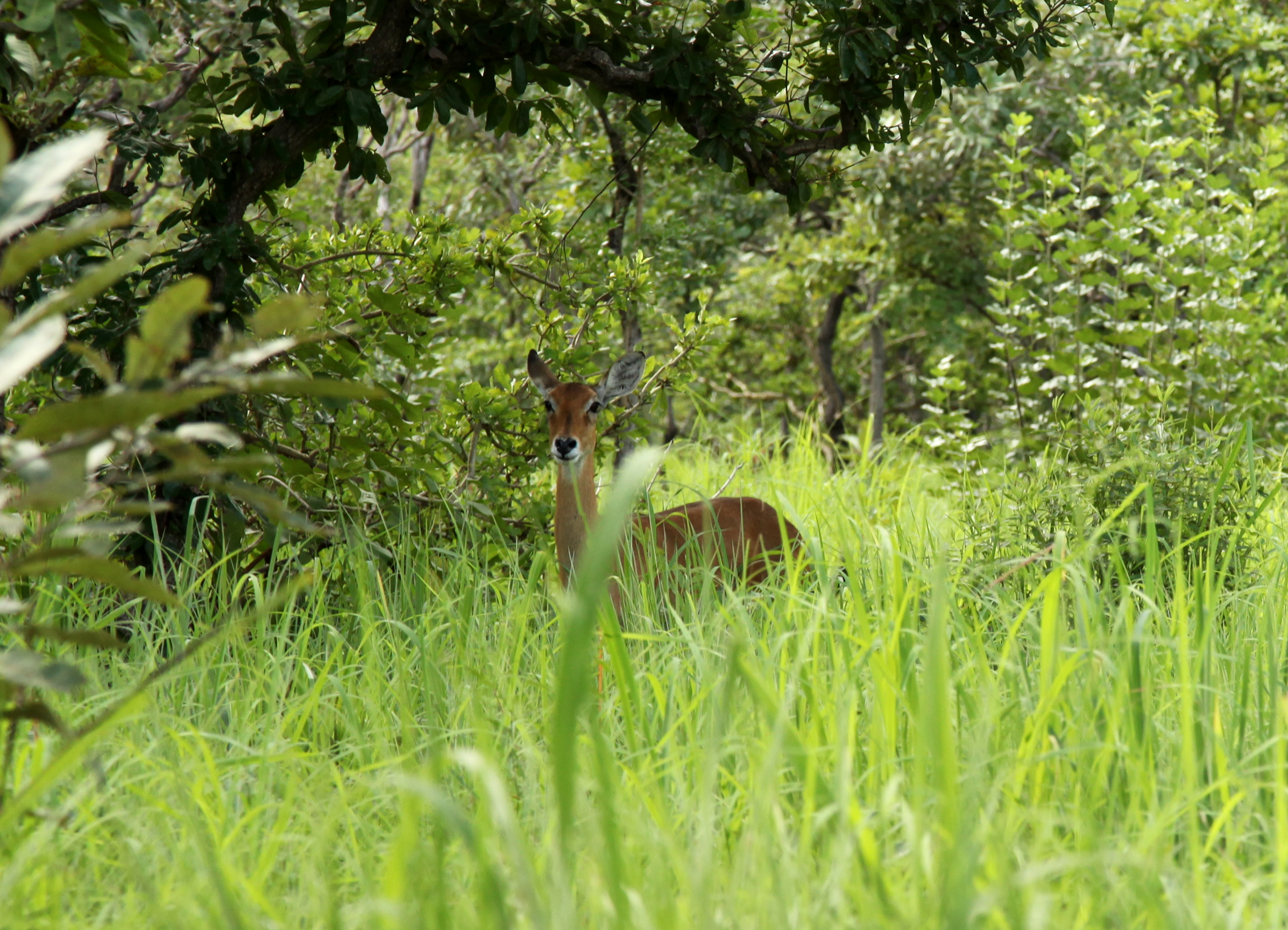
Kainji National Park

Kainji National Park is a national park in Niger State and Kwara State, Nigeria. Established in 1978, it covers an area of about 5,341 km^{2} (2,062 sq mi). The park includes three distinct sectors: a part of the Kainji Lake in which fishing is restricted, the Borgu Game Reserve to the west of the lake, and the Zugurma Game Reserve to the southeast.

Due to insecurity in the region, the National Parks Service temporarily suspended operations and research in the Kainji National Park in 2021, operations were also suspended in the Chad Basin National Park and the Kamuku National Park.

West African Conservation Network, a Nigeria/United Kingdom-based organisation, focused on environmental and wildlife conservation, has begun collaboration with the Nigeria National Park Service to restore the Kainji Lake National Park.

The international organization and the Federal Government of Nigeria signed a 31-year co-management agreement on October 27, 2023, to protect and restore the park in northwestern Nigeria.

The WACN Kainji Lake National Park Project aims to overcome current security challenges and enhance the park within the next decade through strategic partnerships.

== History ==
Kainji National Park was established in 1978 and is divided into three distinct sectors, the Zugurma Game Reserve, the Borgu Game Reserve and Kainji Lake. Since 2005, the protected area is considered a Lion Conservation Unit together with Yankari National Park. The park is owned by the state and managed by the Federal National Park Service (FNPS), receiving direct government funding. This means that enforcement actions against poachers can be pursued under national park law and not in the local courts.

== Geography ==
The Borgu Game Reserve is mostly made up of savanna forest and has an area of 3,929 km^{2} (1,517 mi^{2}), while the Zugurma Game Reserve is smaller, at 1,370 km^{2} (529 mi^{2}). The two main parts of the park are separated by the Kainji Lake, a 136 km (85 mi) long reservoir. The Zugurma sector has no access roads and only the Borgu sector is used for tourism.

The southern and western parts of the Borgu Game Reserve drain into the Oli River, a tributary of the Niger River, while the other parts drain directly into the lake via four small rivers. The Zugurma Game Reserve has little drainage; the smaller watercourses dry up during the dry season, but there are a number of permanent waterholes along the Oli River and elsewhere in the park. The Borgu sector consists of undulating hills with some quartzite ridges and ironstone pans, while the Zugurma sector consists of a low plateau, with soils derived from sandstone, much eroded in places. The mean annual rainfall is about 1,100 mm (43 in), with the wet season lasting from May to November and the dry season from December to April.

== Flora ==
The savanna woodland of the Borgu sector is dominated by Burkea africana, Terminalia avicennioides and Detarium microcarpum. Below the quartzite ridges Isoberlinia tomentosa predominates, and further down the hillsides on the relatively dry lower slopes are stands of Diospyros mespiliformis, with an understory of Polysphaeria orbuscula. Terminalia macroptera occurs on moist savannas and Isoberlinia doka is found on higher ground in ironstone areas. In the Zugurma sector the tree cover is typical of the Guinean forest-savanna mosaic although this area is overgrazed and eroded, and the main woodland is besides the watercourses and waterholes. Common trees here include Afzelia africana, Daniella oliveri, Pterocarpus erinaceus, Terminalia schimperiana, Parkia clappertoniana, Vitellaria paradoxa, Detarium microcarpum, Isoberlinia doka, Uapaca togoensis and Khaya senegalensis.

== Fauna ==
65 mammal species, 350 species of birds, and 30 species of reptiles and amphibians have been recorded in the park. These include lion, leopard, caracal, elephant and African manatee, numerous species of antelope, hippopotamus, African wild dog, honey badger, cheetah, Senegal bushbaby, many species of monkey, and African clawless otter. Reptiles include the Nile crocodile, West African slender-snouted crocodile, four turtle species, Nile monitor, savannah monitor, other lizards and snakes, and 12 amphibian species. There are 82 species of fish in Lake Kainji. The fauna of the Zugurma sector is less varied than of the Borgu sector because of poor drainage, overgrazing by cattle, poor quality vegetation and extensive poaching.
