= Baturiya Wetland =

Ramsar wetland in Jigawa State, Nigeria

- Baturiya Wetland Game Reserve & Baturiya Bird Sanctuary
- IUCN category IV (habitat/species management area)
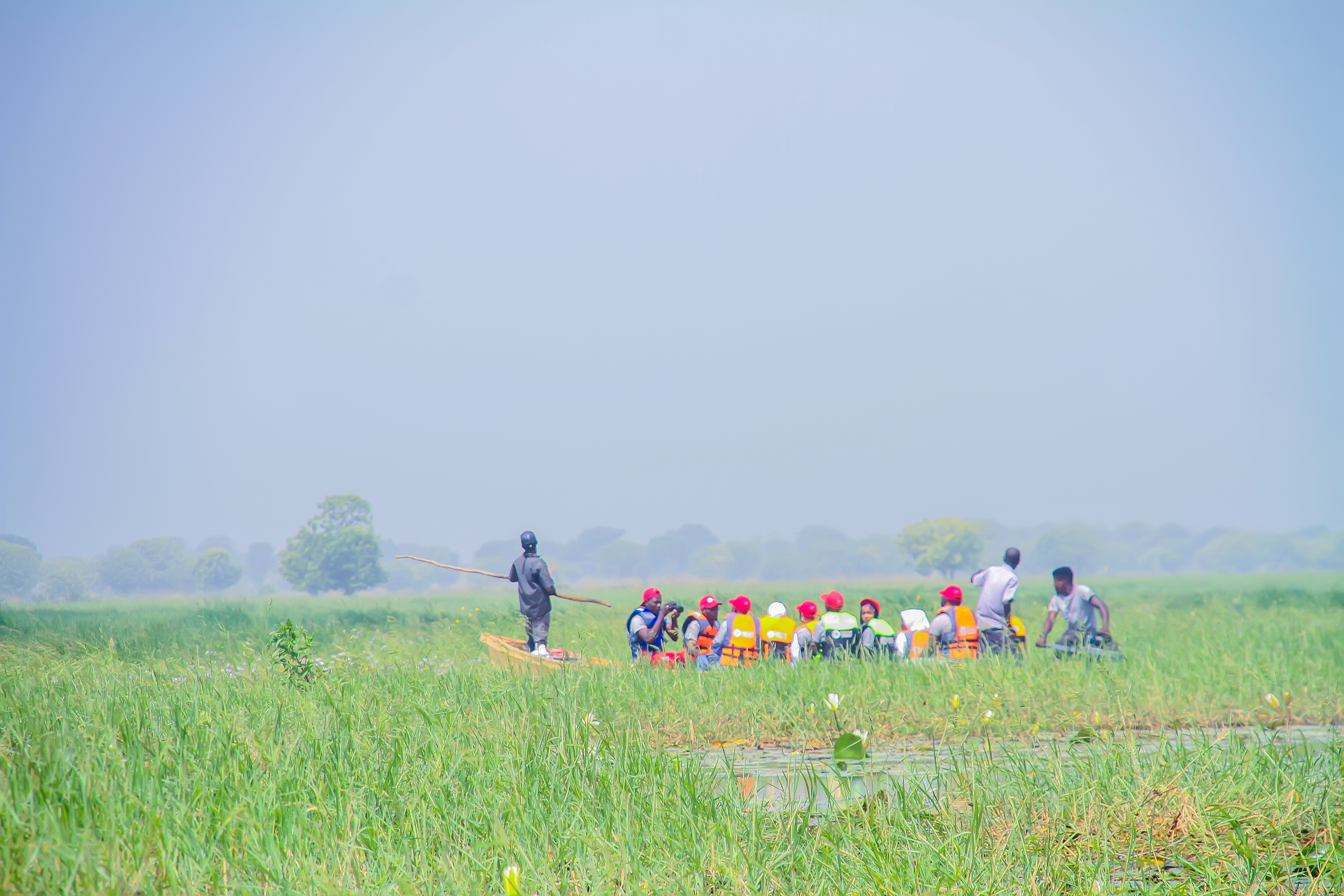
- Unik Impact Foundation medical outreach team travelling by boat through Baturiya Wetland, Jigawa State, Nigeria, during a healthcare outreach programme at Baturiya Community in 2022.
- Interactive map of Baturiya Wetland
- Location: Jigawa State, Nigeria
- Nearest city: Hadejia
- Coordinates: 12°31′N 10°29′E
- Area: 101,095 ha (390.33 sq mi)
- Designation: Ramsar site No. 1752 (30 April 2008)
- Established: 1985 (game reserve)
- Governing body: Federal Ministry of Environment and Jigawa State Government

Baturiya Wetland is a wetland ecosystem and Ramsar Site located in Jigawa State, northwestern Nigeria. It forms part of the larger Hadejia-Nguru wetlands complex in the Sudano-Sahelian ecological zone of West Africa. The wetland is recognized for its biodiversity, particularly its importance for resident and migratory waterbirds, fisheries, floodplain agriculture, and wetland conservation.

The site was designated a Wetland of International Importance on 30 April 2008 and covers approximately 101,095 hectares (1,010.95 km²).

== Geography ==
Baturiya Wetland is situated within the floodplain of the Hadejia River system in northern Nigeria. The wetland lies west of Hadejia town and is replenished by seasonal flooding associated with the Kafin Hausa River and related watercourses within the Hadejia-Nguru basin.

The area is characterized by ponds, marshes, seasonally flooded grasslands and fadama lands, which support both ecological processes and agricultural activities. Elevation within the site ranges between approximately 340 and 345 metres above sea level.

Administratively, the wetland extends across parts of Kirikasamma, Auyo and Guri Local Government Areas of Jigawa State.

== History ==
The area was originally managed as a forest reserve before being gazetted as a game reserve in 1985. Its conservation importance increased due to the presence of significant populations of migratory and resident bird species associated with the Hadejia-Nguru Wetlands ecosystem.

On 30 April 2008, Baturiya Wetland was designated as Ramsar Site No. 1752 under the Ramsar Convention, recognizing its international significance for wetland conservation and biodiversity.

== Ecology ==
Baturiya Wetland represents a typical Sudano-Sahelian floodplain ecosystem and supports a range of habitats including open water, flooded grasslands, woodland patches and agricultural floodplains.

The wetland is particularly important for waterbirds. Species reported from the area include the yellow-billed stork (Mycteria ibis), knob-billed duck (Sarkidiornis melanotos) and African grey hornbill (Lophoceros nasutus).

The site provides seasonal habitat for migratory birds originating from Europe, Asia and other parts of Africa. Its bird diversity has been documented in studies of the wider Hadejia-Nguru wetlands ecosystem.

Other wildlife recorded in and around the wetland include fish species, crocodiles, baboons, monkeys and various aquatic organisms associated with the floodplain environment.

== Human use ==
The wetland supports the livelihoods of communities living within and around the floodplain. Economic activities include fishing, flood-recession agriculture, livestock grazing and harvesting of natural resources.

More than 10,000 people are estimated to depend directly on the wetland's resources for subsistence and income generation.

The area has also developed a reputation as a birdwatching and ecotourism destination due to its concentration of waterbirds and association with the Hadejia-Nguru Wetlands.

== Conservation ==
Baturiya Wetland is protected under the Ramsar Convention as a Wetland of International Importance and is managed through a multiple-use framework that permits regulated fishing, grazing and resource harvesting while maintaining ecological functions.

Conservation initiatives have focused on biodiversity monitoring, wetland restoration and sustainable resource management. In 2024, the Nigeria Integrated Water Resources Management Commission participated in conservation planning and wetland assessment activities involving Baturiya Wetland.

== Threats ==
The wetland faces environmental pressures including habitat degradation, deforestation, unsustainable hunting, overgrazing, agricultural expansion, sedimentation, drought and climate change.

Researchers and conservation organizations have identified these pressures as potential threats to biodiversity, ecosystem services and local livelihoods dependent on the wetland.

== See also ==
- Hadejia-Nguru wetlands
- List of Ramsar sites in Nigeria
- Protected areas of Nigeria
