= List of national parks of Nigeria =

National Parks of Nigeria

The national parks of Nigeria are preserved, enhanced, protected and managed by the Nigeria National Park Service. The Nigeria National Park Service is a parastatal under the Federal Ministry of the Environment, and is headed by a conservator general. It works closely with the Nigerian Tourism Development Corporation.

The first national park was Kainji Lake, established by the military ruler General Olusegun Obasanjo in 1979. The National Parks Governing Board and five new National Parks were set up in 1991.

Yankari Game Reserve was upgraded to a national park in 1992, although it was later handed over to the Bauchi State government in June 2006.

The parks cover a total land area of approximately 20,156 km^{2} (7,782 sq mi), or about 3% of Nigeria's total land area.

== Parks ==
Park	Area		Established	State(s)	Notes
Park	km^{2}	sq mi	Established	State(s)	Notes
Chad Basin	2,258	872	1991	Borno, Yobe	Includes part of the Hadejia-Nguru wetlands and the Sambisa Game Reserve
Cross River	4,000	1,500	1991	Cross River	Okwangwo section and Oban section (1,906 km^{2}; 736 sq mi)
Gashaka Gumti	6,402	2,472	1991	Taraba, Adamawa	
Kainji	5,341	2,062	1979	Niger, Kwara	Includes Kainji Lake, Borgu Game Reserve and Zugurma Game Reserve
Kamuku	1,120	430	1999	Kaduna	
Okomu	181	70	1999	Edo	Part of the Okomu Forest Reserve
Old Oyo	2,512	970	1991	Oyo, Kwara	
Yankari	2,244	866	1962	Bauchi	Operated by the Bauchi State government
Oba Hills	4,229	1,633	2021	Iwo	Upgraded to National Park in 2021 and officially handed offer to federal Government in 2024

== History ==
=== Colonial era ===
During British colonial rule, authorities used forest conservation as a pretense for further colonial exploitation of Nigeria's resources. This included the establishment of a forestry department and policies on forestry.

=== Establishment of the National Parks Service ===
The first national park was Kainji Lake, established by the military ruler General Olusegun Obasanjo in 1979. The National Parks Governing Board and five new National Parks were set up in 1991.

Despite their establishment, Nigeria's national parks have faced various challenges, including habitat degradation, poaching, and illegal logging.
