= West African Conservation Network =

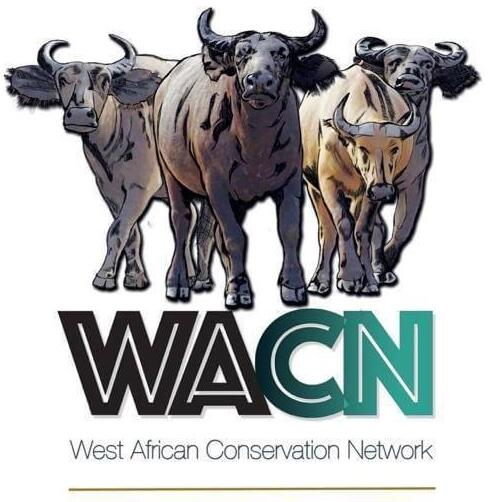
- Formation: August 2020
- Founder: Patrick Ogbonnia Egwu
- Headquarters: NIgeria and The United Kingdom
- Website: https://www.westafricanconservation.org/

West African Conservation Network (WACN) is a non-profit organization established by Patrick Ogbonnia Egwu, with a primary mission of preserving and restoring wilderness areas.

== Location ==
WACN has its headquarters on the 7th Floor of Mulliner Towers, Alfred Rewane Road Lagos, 101233, Nigeria and Kemp House, City Road, London, EC1V 2NX, United Kingdom.

== Overview ==
WACN was established in August 2020. With an emphasis on collaboration with governmental entities, the organization seeks to address the decline of wilderness regions, aspiring to transform them into sustainable ecosystems. The organization endeavors to promote sustainability within these habitats through strategic initiatives, aiming to ensure their long-term viability for future generations. WACN's mission centers on the restoration and protection of depleted wilderness areas. This mission entails establishing agreements with governmental authorities governing the respective jurisdictions of these wilderness areas. Utilizing meticulous protection measures and strategic reintroduction efforts, WACN endeavors to reverse the decline of biodiversity within these regions, to restore them to their original levels of ecological integrity.

== Projects ==
Kainji Lake National Park

In October 2023, the West African Conservation Network (WACN) entered into a 31-year renewable co-management agreement with the Nigerian National Park Service to support the conservation and restoration of Kainji Lake National Park. Located in Niger State and Kwara State, the park spans over 5,300 km² and is one of Nigeria’s oldest and most ecologically significant protected areas.

WACN’s involvement is aimed at addressing the park’s longstanding conservation challenges, including underfunding, poaching, and security threats. As part of this collaboration, WACN committed to enhancing anti-poaching efforts, equipping and training park rangers, and refurbishing essential infrastructure such as vehicles and boats. The organization also plans to utilize technology to support surveillance and wildlife monitoring

The project includes the restoration of key wildlife populations through habitat protection and species reintroduction programs. WACN has expressed a goal of doubling the populations of large carnivores and ungulates in the park by 2040, including lions, leopards, elephants, and other species native to the region. These efforts will be supported by regular wildlife censuses and ecological monitoring
