= Kamuku National Park =

National park in Kaduna, Nigeria

- IUCN category II (national park)
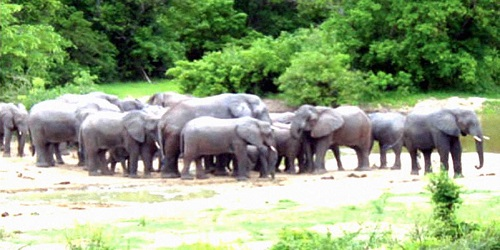

- Location within Nigeria
- Coordinates: 10°45′0″N 6°30′0″E
- Area: 1,120 km^{2} (430 sq mi)
- Established: 1999

The Kamuku National Park is a Nigerian national park in Kaduna State, Nigeria, with a total area of about 1,120 km^{2} (430 sq mi). The park has a typical Sudanian Savanna ecology.

Due to insecurity in the region, the National Park Service temporarily suspended operations and research in the Kamuku National Park in 2021; operations were also suspended in the Kainji National Park and the Chad Basin National Park.

== Location and history ==
The park is located in the west of Kaduna State, and is adjacent to the Kwiambana Game Reserve to the north west and 14 km (8.7 mi) away from main town. It was established in 1936 as the Native Authority Forest Reserve of Birnin Gwari under the Northern Nigeria Government. It was upgraded from a state Game Reserve to a National Park in May 1999, in part due to the success of a community-based project promoting sustainable resource usage, managed by Savanna Conservation Nigeria, a national NGO. The Federal government has been seeking to partner with foreign investors to develop eco-tourism in this and other national parks.

== Environment ==
The park has generally flat terrain, sloping gradually upwards to the Birnin Gwari Ridge along the eastern boundary. Natural features of interest include the Dogon Ruwa Waterfalls; the Goron Dutse, a large isolated inselberg with a smooth surface stratified in a pattern of black and white squares; and the Tsaunin Rema, a hill made of large boulders piled on top of each other, with a large population of rock hyraxes.

Vegetation is Guinea Savanna with some transitional Sudan Savanna elements in places. The park and the nearby forest reserves have some of the best preserved blocks of this ecosystem in the country. Dominant trees include Isoberlinia doka, Terminalia avicennioides and Detarium macrocarpum. Other common trees include Daniellia oliveri, Nauclea latifolia, Acacia, Lophira lanceolata, Parkia biglobosa, Prosopis africana and Isoberlinia tomentosa. The riparian forests that line small, seasonal rivers often include oil palms (Elaeis guineensis). Other common plant species include Afzelia, Monotes and Raphia shrubs.

== Fauna ==
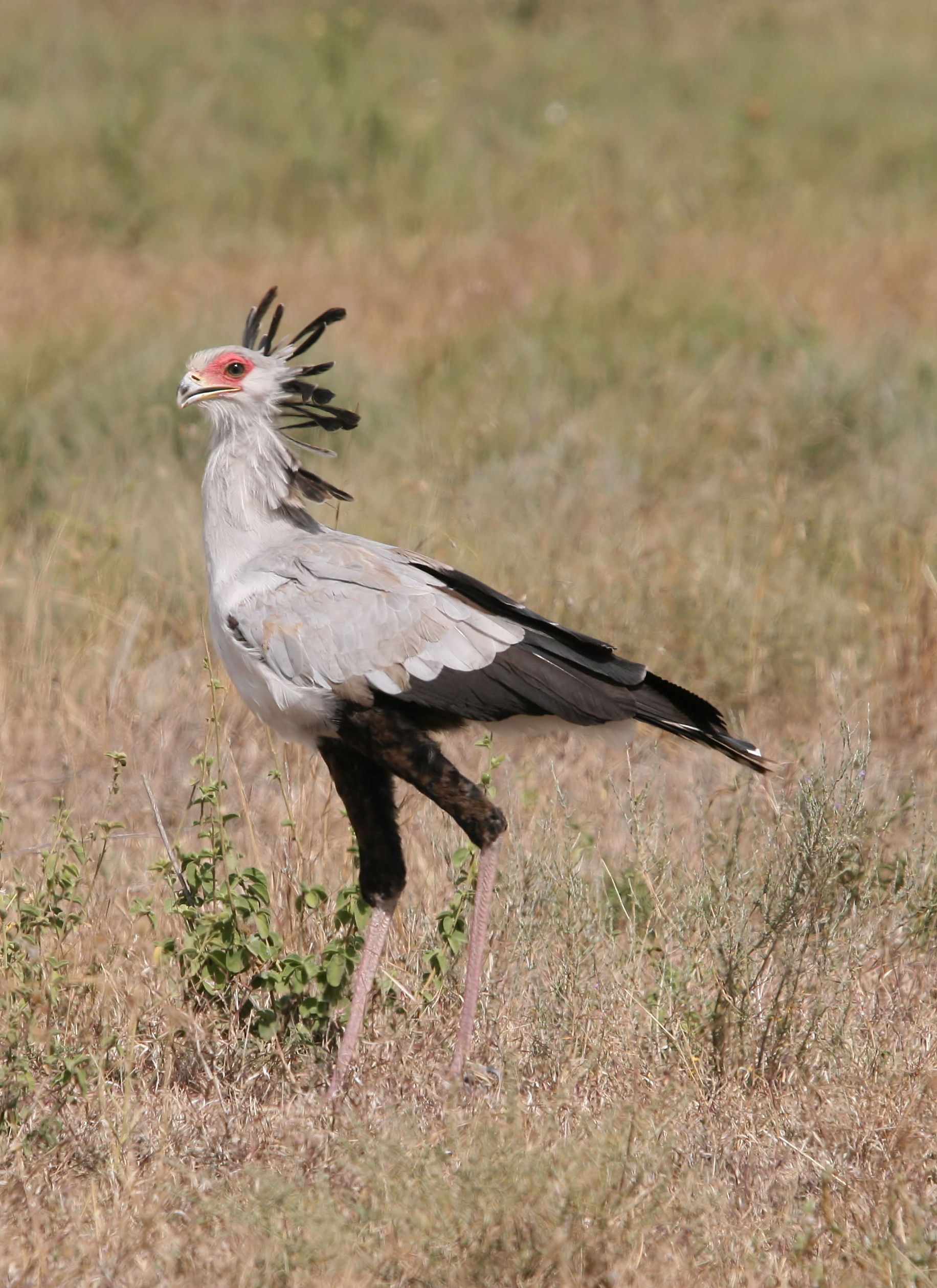
Secretarybird (Sagittarius serpentarius)

Kamuku National Park has an enviable biodiversity profile. It supports about 19 species of mammals including elephants (a major ecotourism attraction for visitors to the Park), roan antelopes, duikers, hartebeest, baboons, warthog, bushbuck, patas monkeys, and green monkeys. There are at least 177 species of birds, including migrants and residents. The park is important for species such as the secretarybird (Sagittarius serpentarius), Denham's bustard (Neotis denhami) and the Abyssinian ground-hornbill (Bucorvus abyssinicus) which are rare in other parts of Nigeria.

== People ==
The area in and around the park is the home of the Gwari and Kamuku people, traditional farmers, hunters, pastoralists and craftsmen, noted for weaving, mat making and pottery. The Gwari are said to have originated from Zungeru in Niger State, and the Kamuku are said to have come from the Sokoto and Katsina areas during the Fulani jihad at the start of the 19th century. The park includes places considered sacred by these people, such as hills, rock outcrops, marshes and streams, and the ancient Parnono Shrine. The present town of Birnin Gwari was founded in 1957 by Gwari people who had migrated from an earlier settlement about fifty km (31 mi) to the north. Hunting and illegal cattle-grazing by the pastoralist settlements on the edge of the park pose threats to the park environment.
