= Kainji Lake =

Reservoir on the Niger River

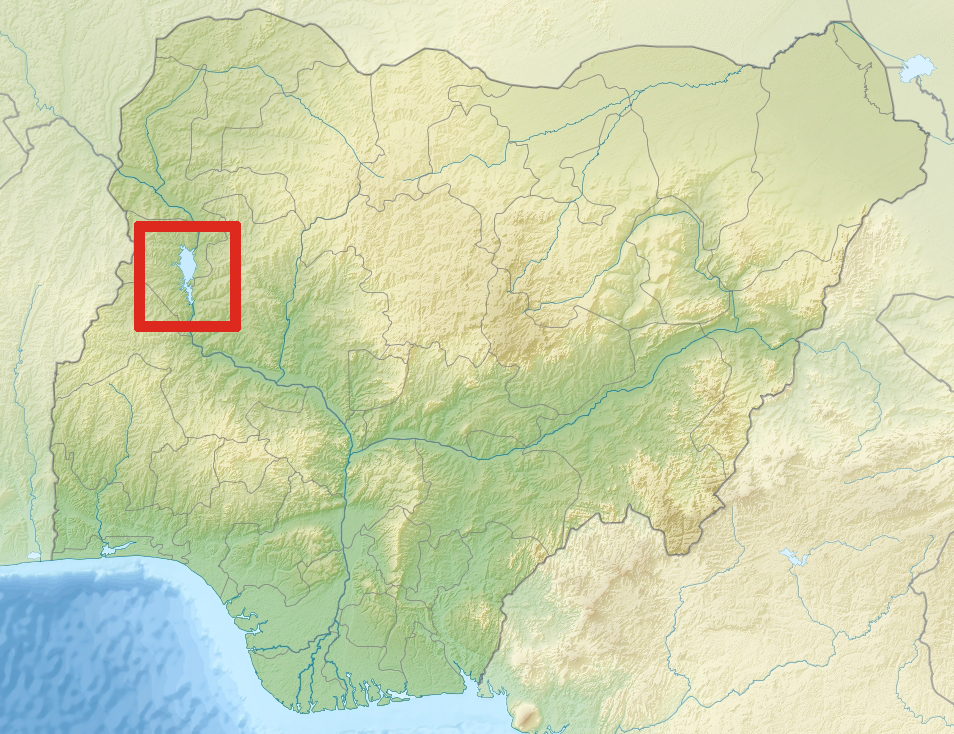
- Kainji Lake highlighted within Nigeria

- Location within Nigeria
- Location: Western Nigeria
- Coordinates: 10°22′N 4°33′E
- Primary inflows: Niger River
- Primary outflows: Niger River
- Basin countries: Nigeria
- Surface area: max. 1,243 km^{2} (480 sq mi)
- Max. depth: 12.1 m (40 ft)
- Water volume: 15 km^{3} (12,000,000 acre⋅ft)

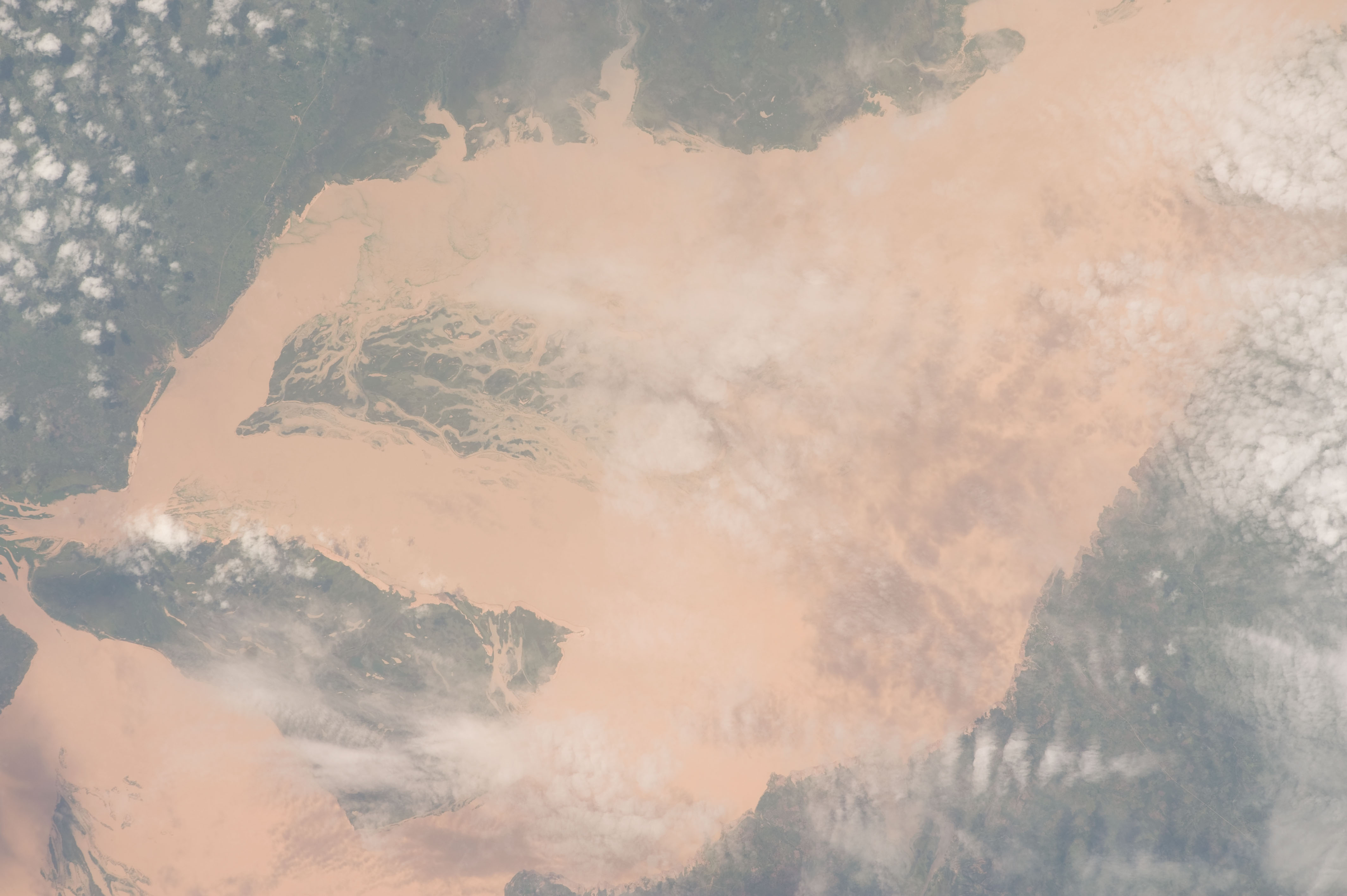
Kainji Reservoir viewed from the International Space Station (August 2009)

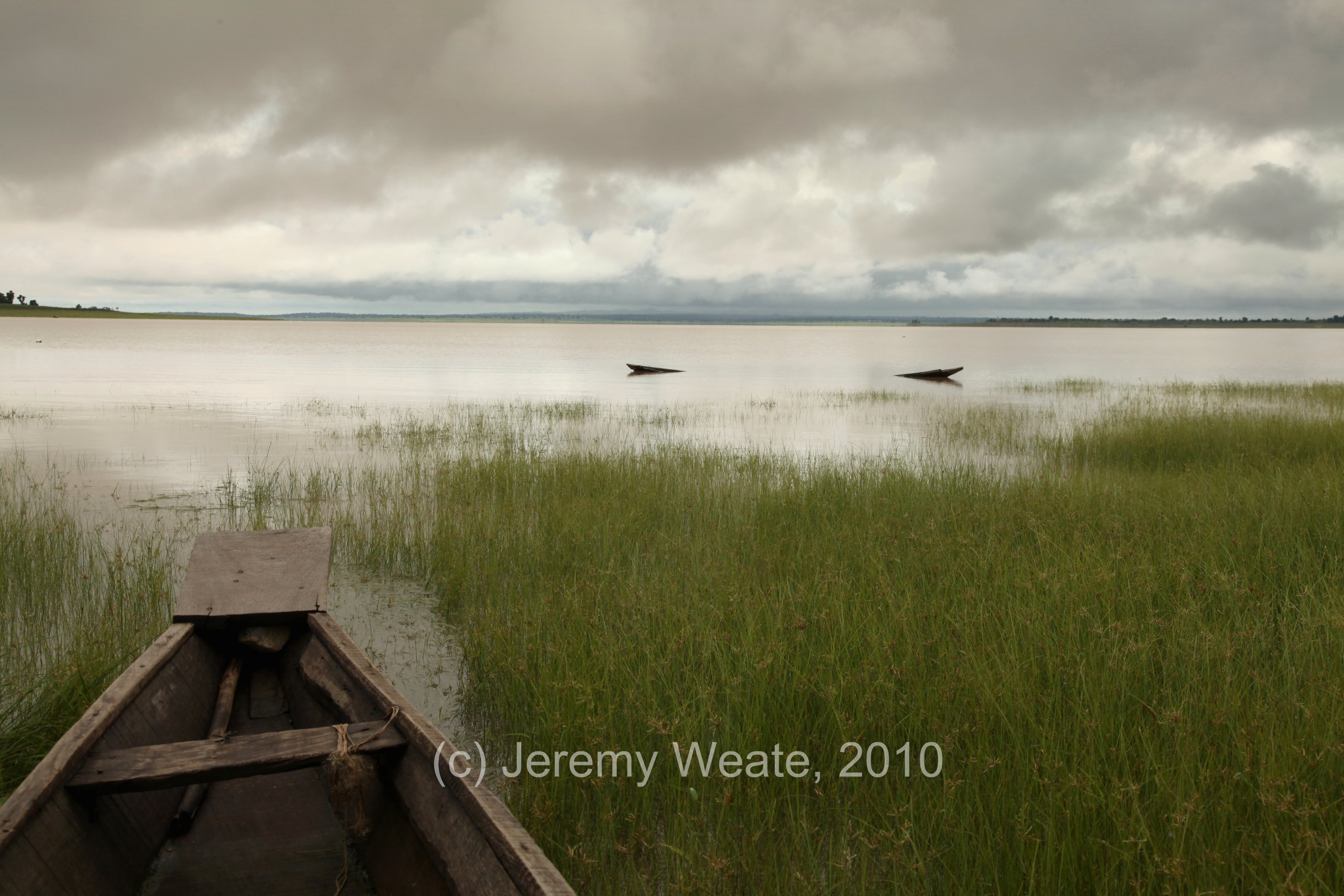
Kainji Lake

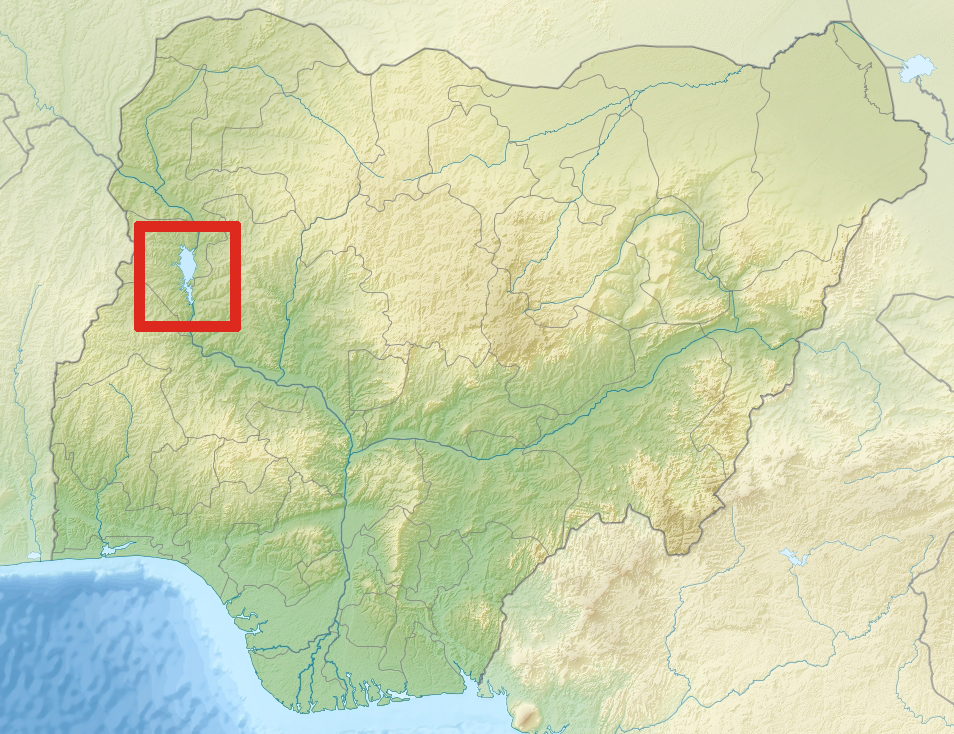
Kainji Lake within Nigeria

Kainji Lake, in North Central Nigeria, is a reservoir on the Niger River, formed by the Kainji Dam. It was formed in 1968 and is a part of Niger State and Kebbi State. Kainji Lake National Park (KNLP), situated around the lake, is Nigeria's oldest National Park, established in 1976.

== Kainji Dam ==
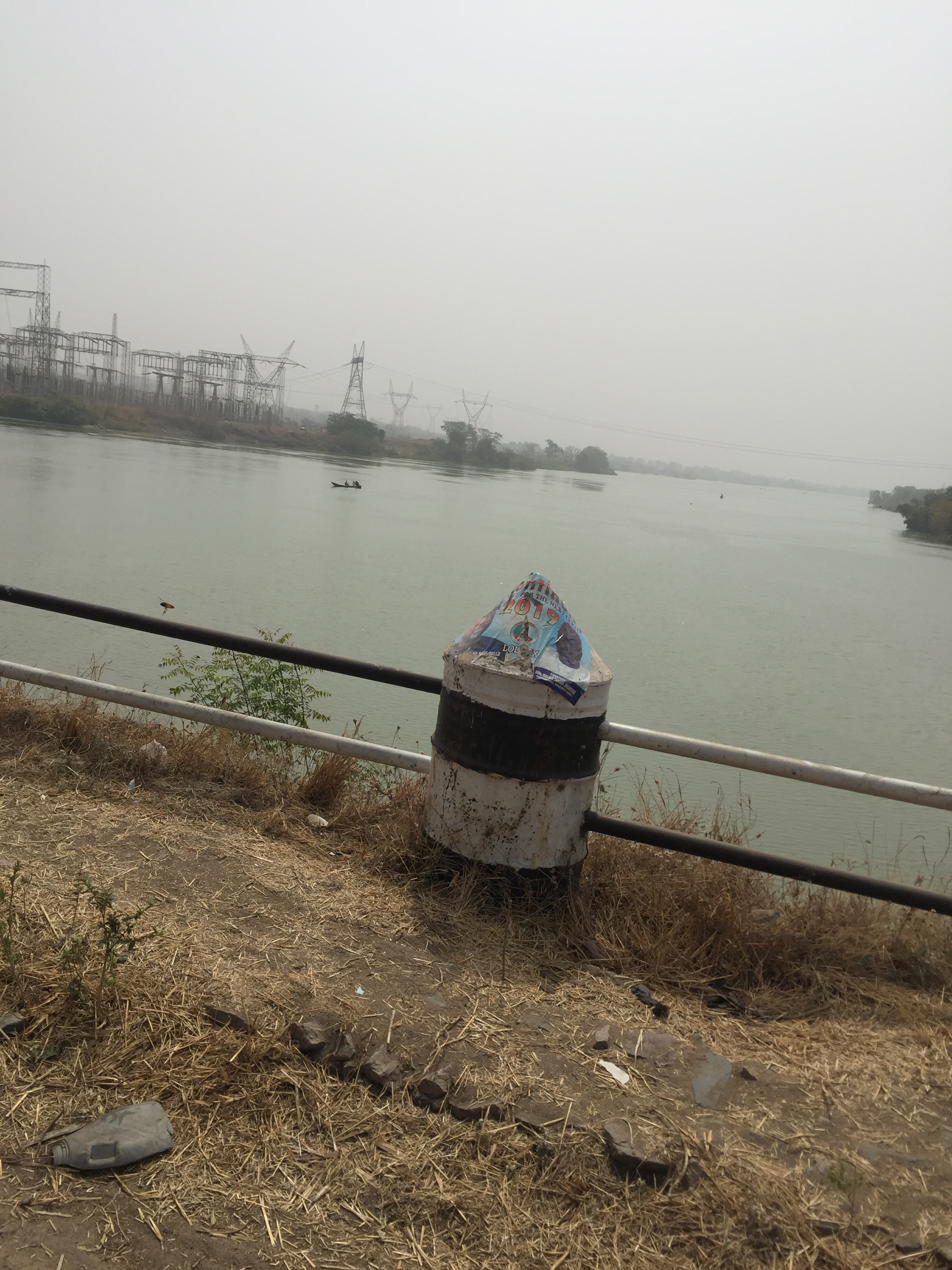
Kainji Lake

The Kainji Dam is situated in the Northern region of Niger State and generates power for most towns in Nigeria. It was built from 1964 to 1968 and cost about 209 million dollars, a quarter of which was used to relocate the original population. Together with a smaller dam for a minor stream, it is 10 kilometres (6.2 mi) long and 65 metres (213 ft) high in the middle. It has a capacity of 12 turbines producing a total of 960 MW, but only 8 were installed, producing 760 MW. Part of the production is sold to the neighbouring country of Niger.

According to reports in 2023, the Kanji Dam was affected by flood due to the opening of the Lagdo Reservoir dam in Cameroon.

== National Park ==
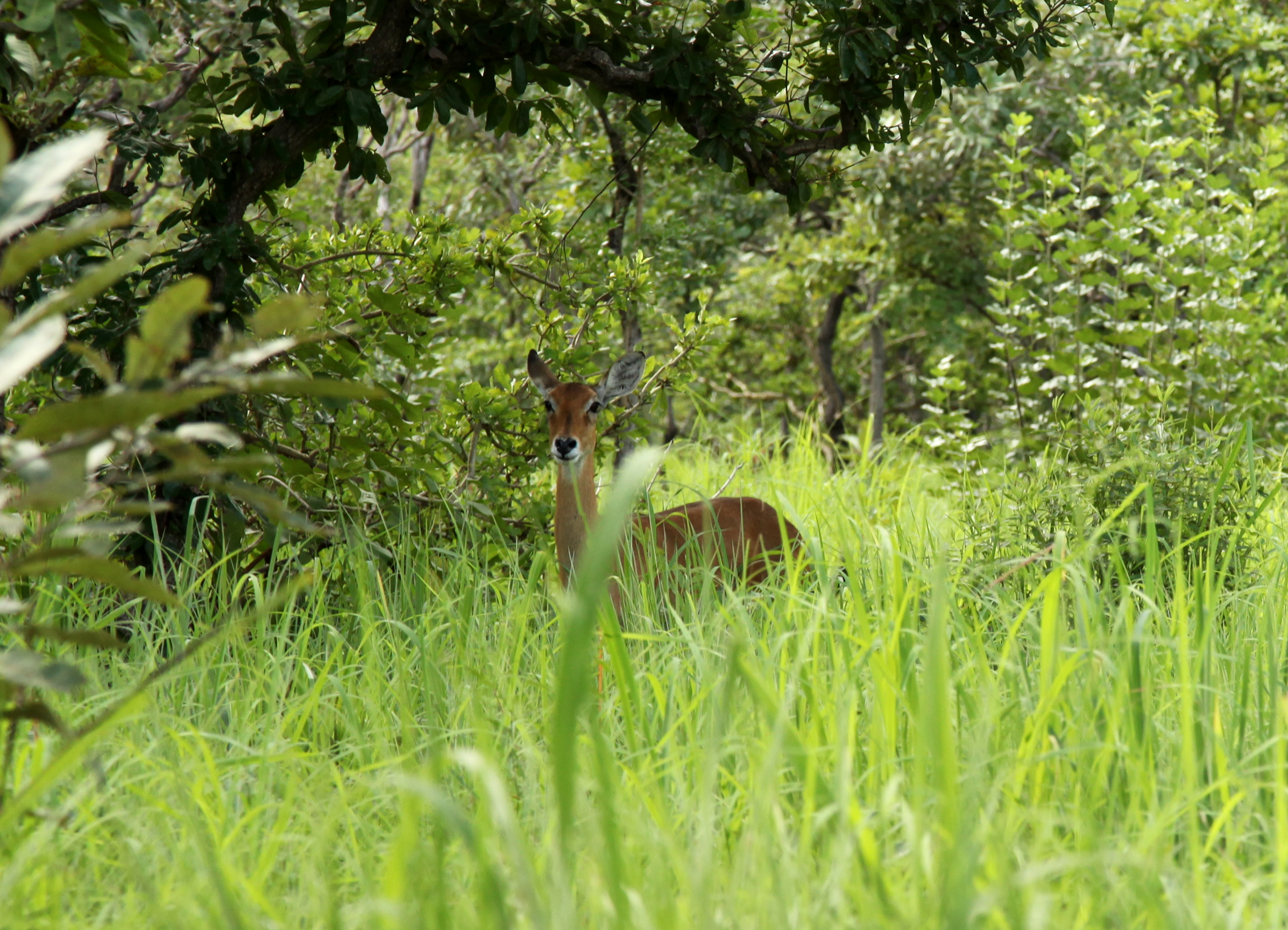
Kob antelope in the National Park

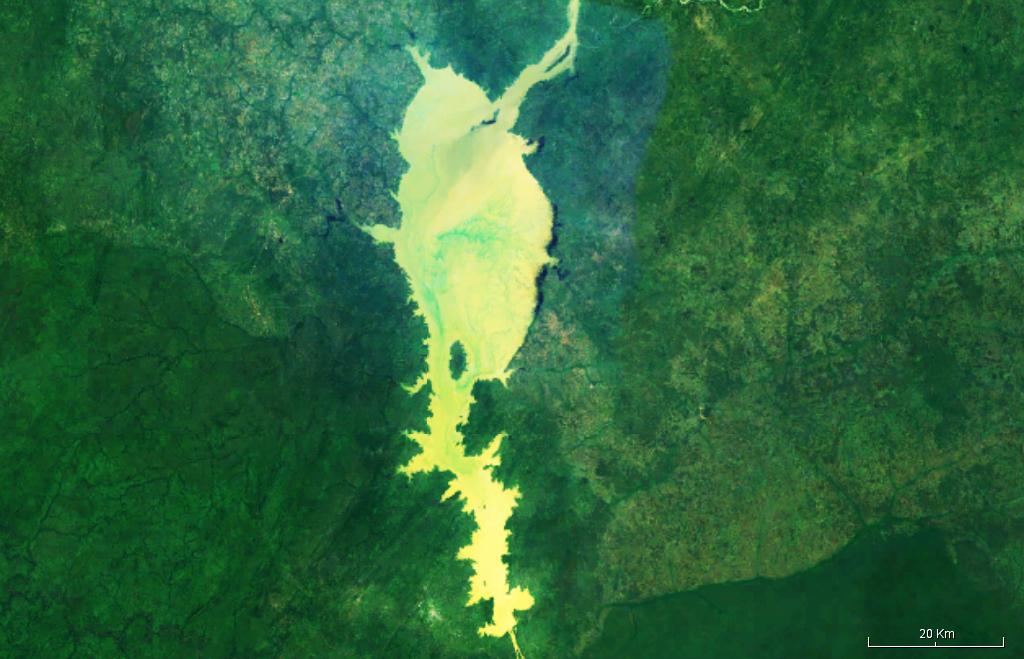
Kainji Lake

Kainji Lake National Park (KNLP) (headquarters Wawa) is situated 560 kilometres (350 mi) north of Lagos, close to the border with the Republic of Benin. It comprises two sectors, Borgu Game Reserve and Zugurma Game Reserve, which are separated by Kainji Lake. The abundant wildlife in the game preserves include baboons, duikers, hippopotami, hyenas, kobs, roan antelopes, and warthogs.

Only the Borgu (western) sector is currently used for tourism; the Zugurma (eastern) sector lacks infrastructure, including access roads. The topography of the park is gently undulating with a general decrease in elevation from west to east. The Borgu sector is drained mainly by the Oli, Timo and Doro rivers and their tributaries, while the Zugurma sector is drained by the Maingyara and Nuwa Tizururu rivers. The vegetation of the park is typical of the Guinean forest-savanna mosaic, although in some areas it appears more Sahelian. Riparian forests occur on the banks of the larger watercourses.

== Climate ==
Kainji Lake has a dry and wet seasons that last from the month of April to November. A typical year that has 1,100 to 1,200 mm (43 to 47 in) of rain, or over 195 days.

== Conservation issues ==
Although the area around the park has a relatively low population density, numerous human activities adversely affect the park. These include deforestation, uncontrolled burning and illegal grazing and are particularly prevalent in the Zugurma sector. Wild mammals occur at relatively low densities due to illegal hunting. Lake Kainji has suffered a dramatic decline as a fishery due to the high numbers of artisanal and subsistence fisherfolk using the lake. It has been suggested that a period of closure, together with controlled fishing rights may help improve fish stocks.
