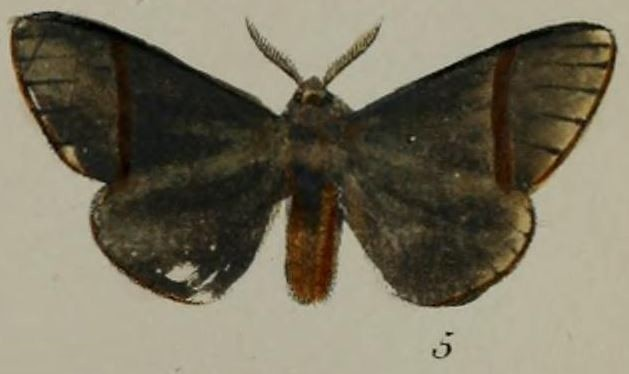

Scientific classification
- Kingdom: Animalia
- Phylum: Arthropoda
- Clade: Pancrustacea
- Class: Insecta
- Order: Lepidoptera
- Superfamily: Noctuoidea
- Family: Notodontidae
- Genus: Epanaphe
- Species: E. moloneyi

Binomial name
- Epanaphe moloneyi (H. Druce, 1887)

Synonyms
- Anaphe moloneyi H. Druce, 1887

= Epanaphe moloneyi =

Species of moth

Epanaphe moloneyi is a moth in the family of Notodontidae that is found in Africa. The species was first described by Herbert Druce in 1887.

== Distribution ==
It is known from Cameroon, the Democratic Republic of the Congo, Ghana, the Gambia and Uganda.

== Biology ==
Known host plants of this species are: Cassia species (Fabaceae), Triplochiton scleroxylon (Malvaceae), Rourea coccinea (Connaraceae). Albizia species, Bridelia micrantha, Ficus platyphylla, Isoberlinia doka, Macrolobium species, Pericopsis laxiflora and Senna siamea.
