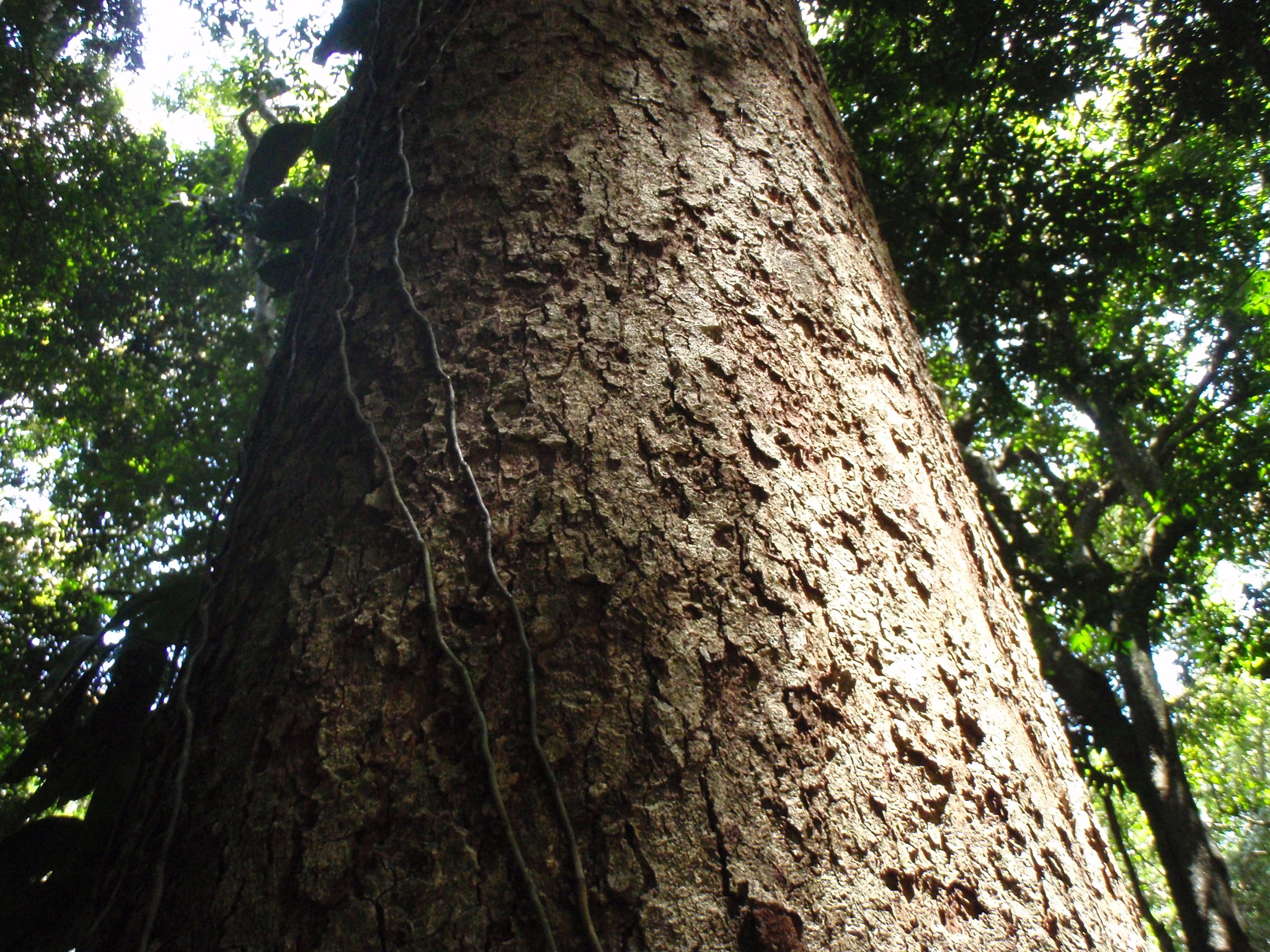

Conservation status
- Vulnerable (IUCN 3.1)

Scientific classification
- Kingdom: Plantae
- Clade: Tracheophytes
- Clade: Angiosperms
- Clade: Eudicots
- Clade: Rosids
- Order: Fabales
- Family: Fabaceae
- Genus: Isoberlinia
- Species: I. scheffleri

Binomial name
- Isoberlinia scheffleri (Harms) Greenway

= Isoberlinia scheffleri =

Species of legume

Isoberlinia scheffleri is a species of plant in the family Fabaceae. It is found only in Tanzania.
