= Gujba Forest Reserve =

Protected area in Yobe State, Nigeria

- Location: Yobe state
- Nearest city: Damaturu
- Area: 410 km^{2} (160 sq mi)

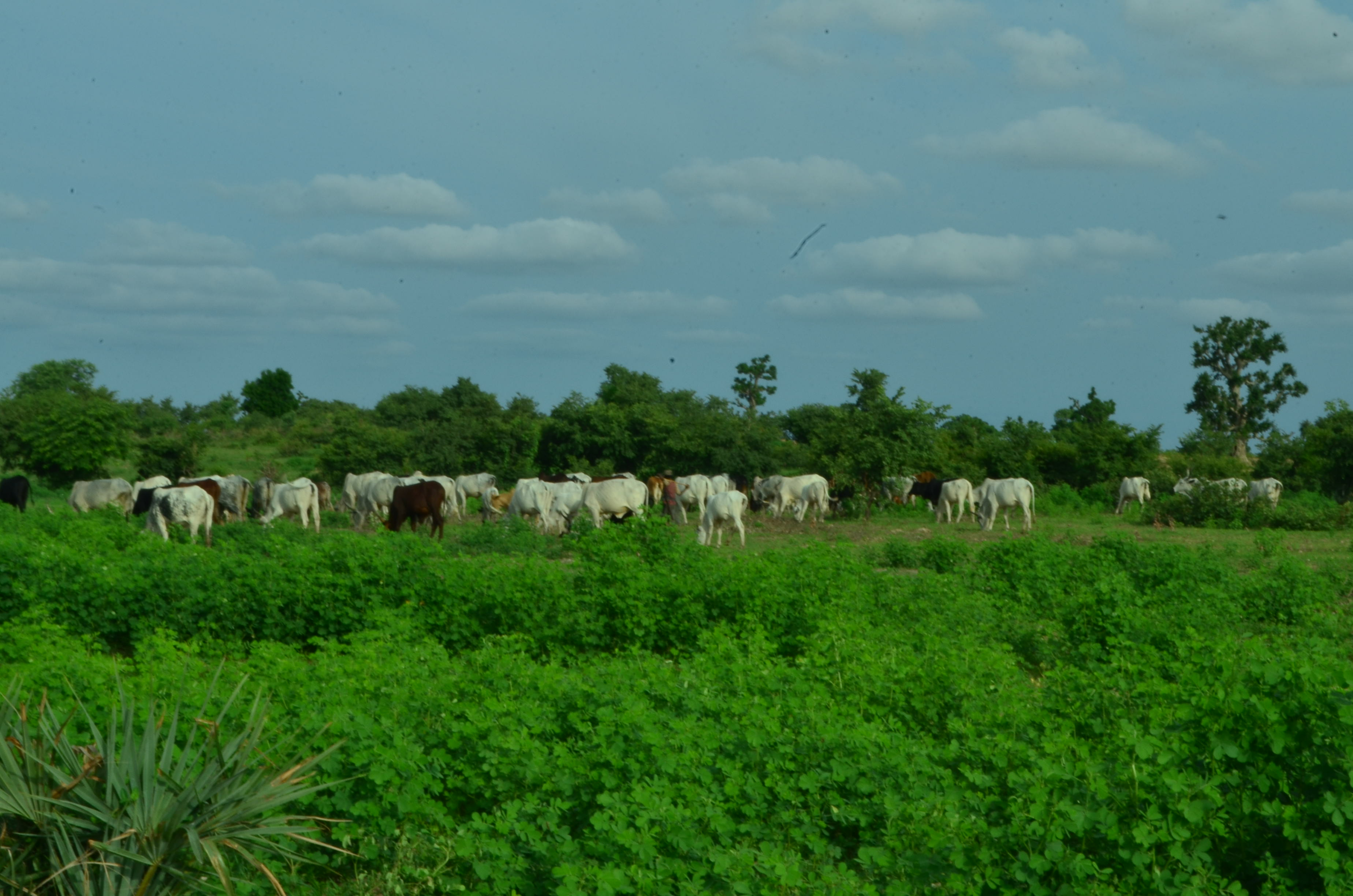
Herders with cows in Gujba Forest Reserve

Gujba Forest Reserve is a protected area in Yobe State, Nigeria.

Its headquarters are in the town of Buni Yadi at towards the south of the area; the eponymous town of Gujba lies in the north of the area.

It covers an area of 410 km^{2} (160 sq mi).

== Gallery ==
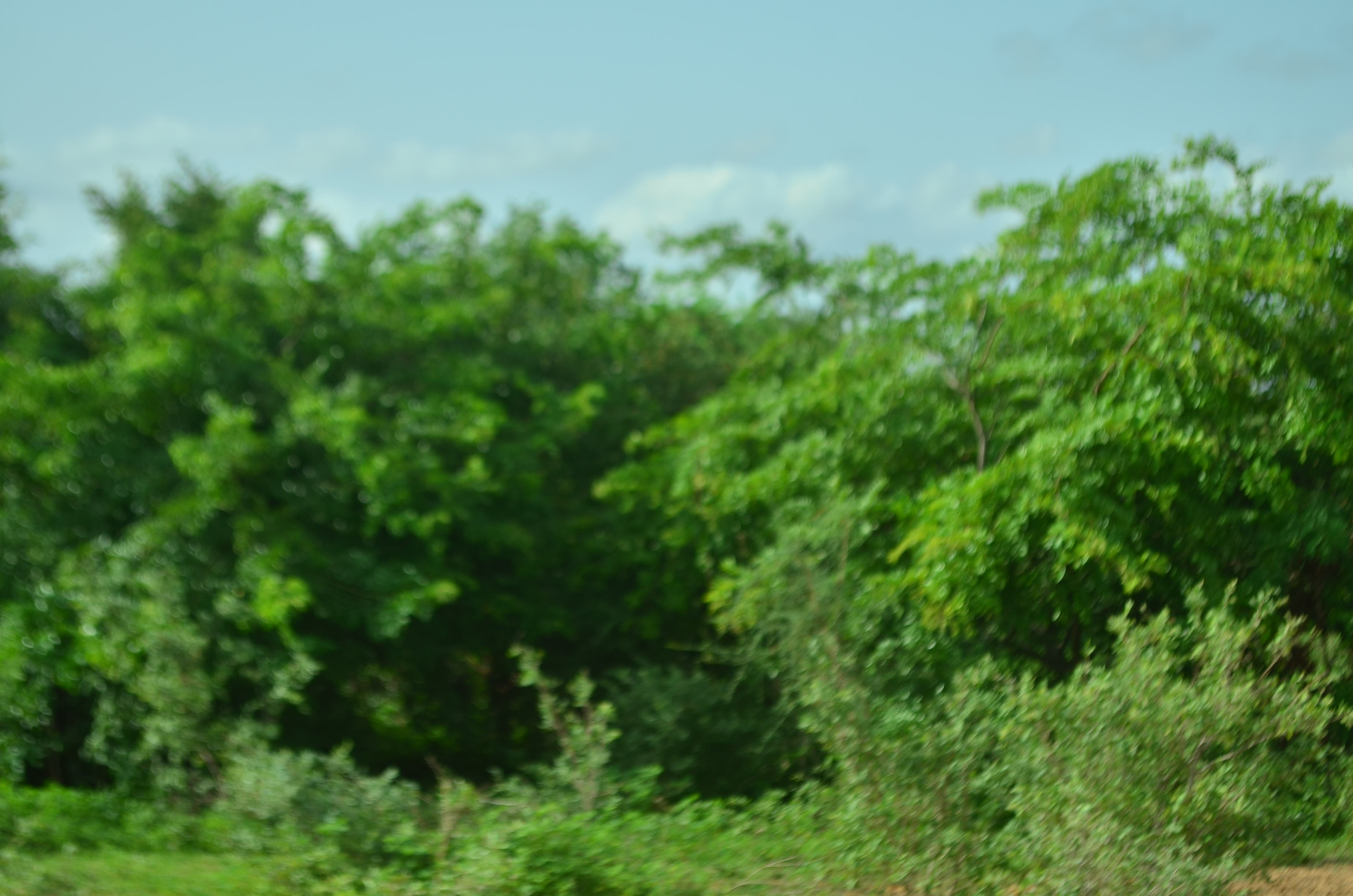
Trees in Gujba Forest Reserve

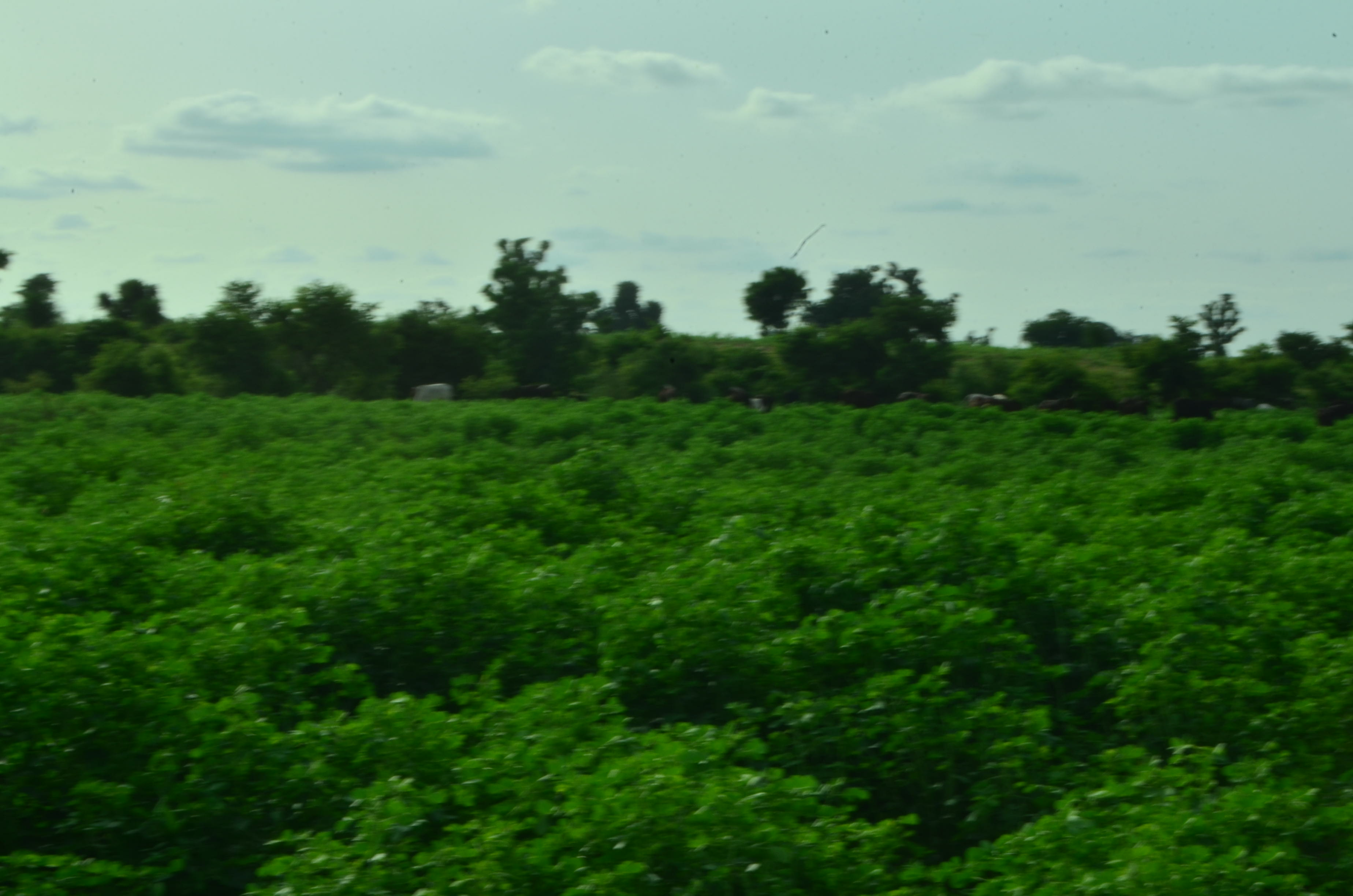
Green plants in Gujba Forest Reserve

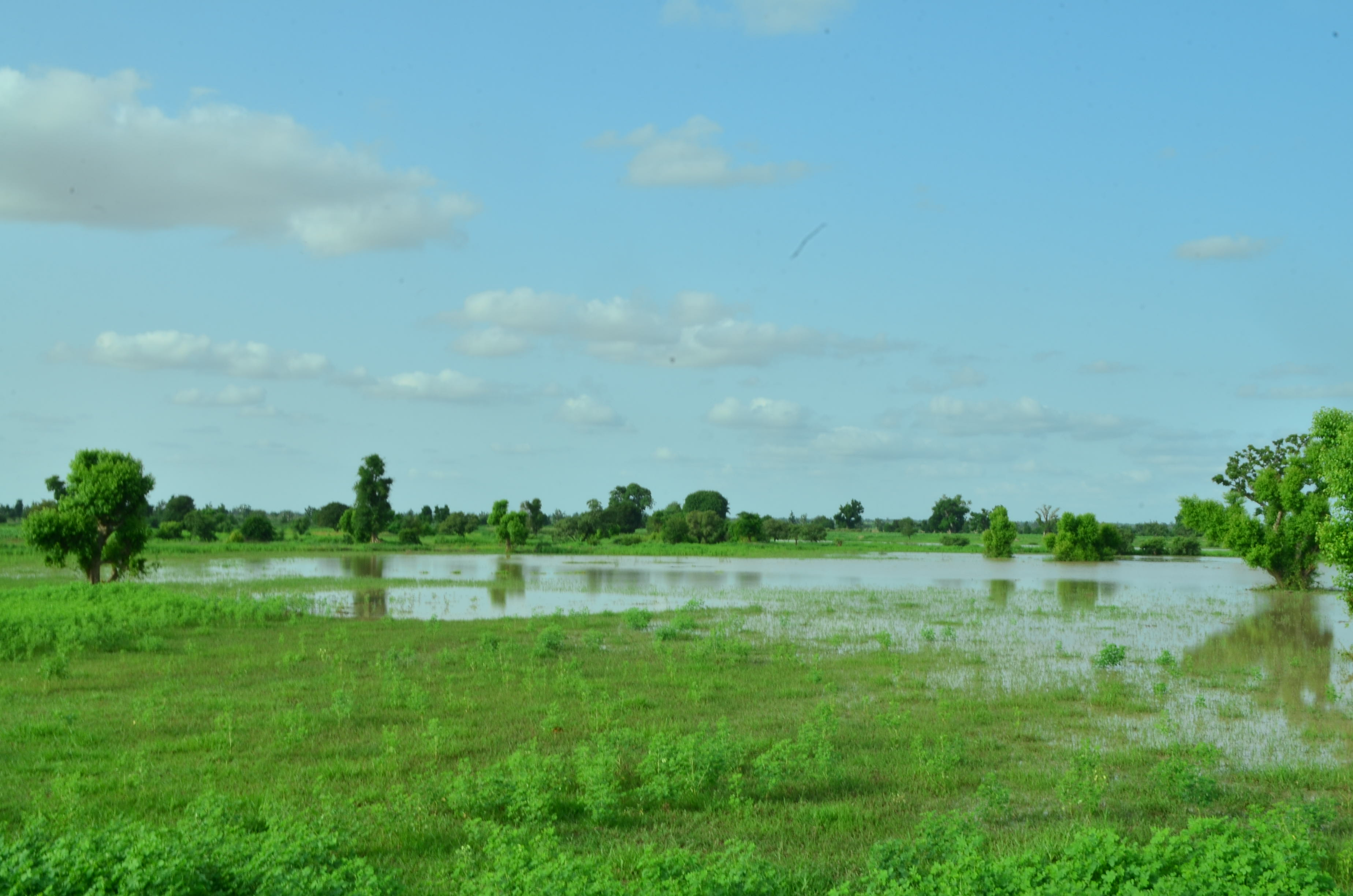
A river inside the Gujba Forest reserve

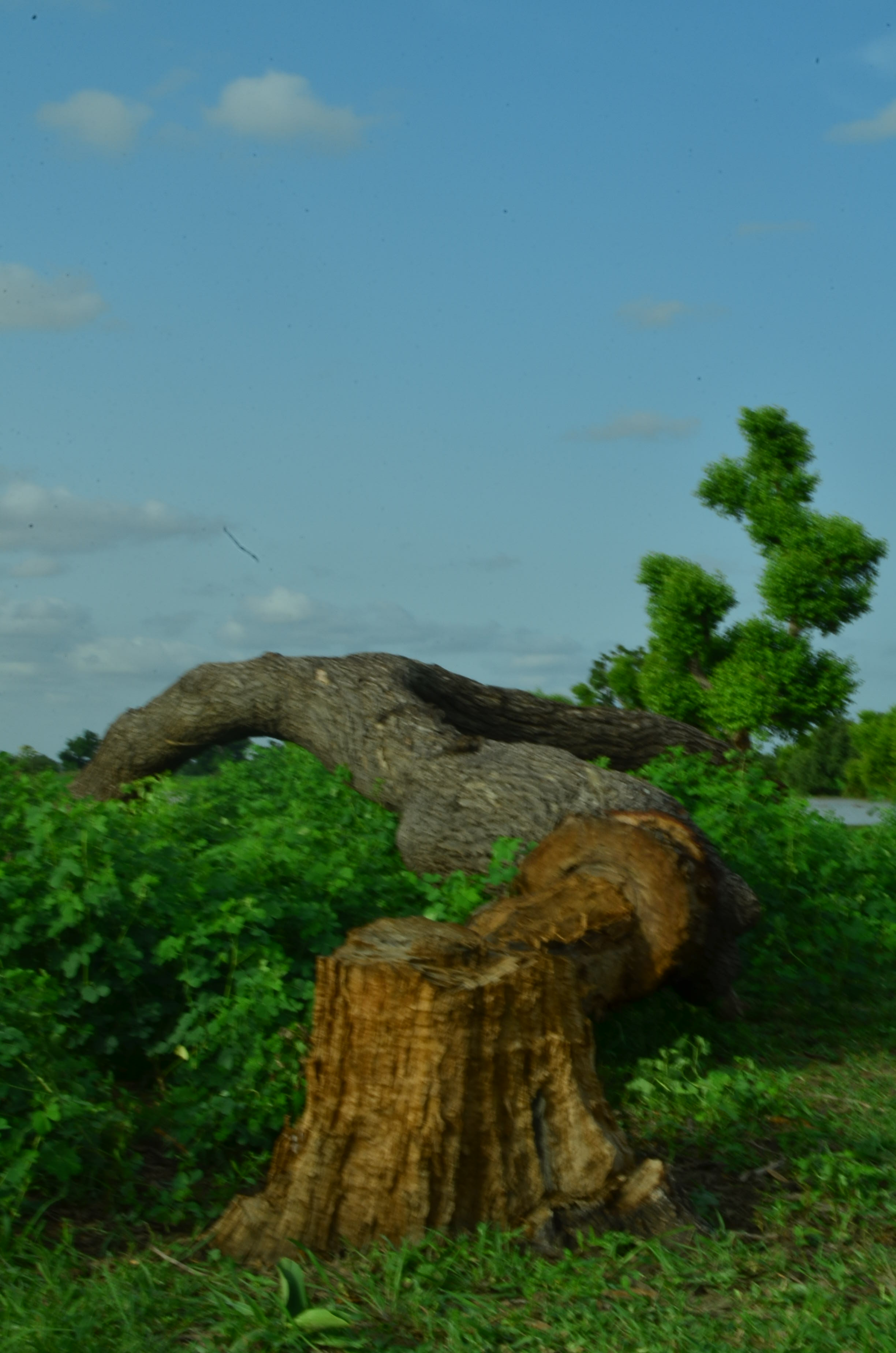
Fell down tree in Gujba Forest reserve

== See also ==
- Natural areas of Nigeria
