= Ohosu Game Reserve =

Game reserve in Edo State, Nigeria

- Location: Nigeria
- Area: 471 square kilometres (182 sq mi)

The Ohosu Game Reserve is located in Edo State, Nigeria. The area of the site is 471 square kilometres (182 sq mi).
