= Kainji Dam =

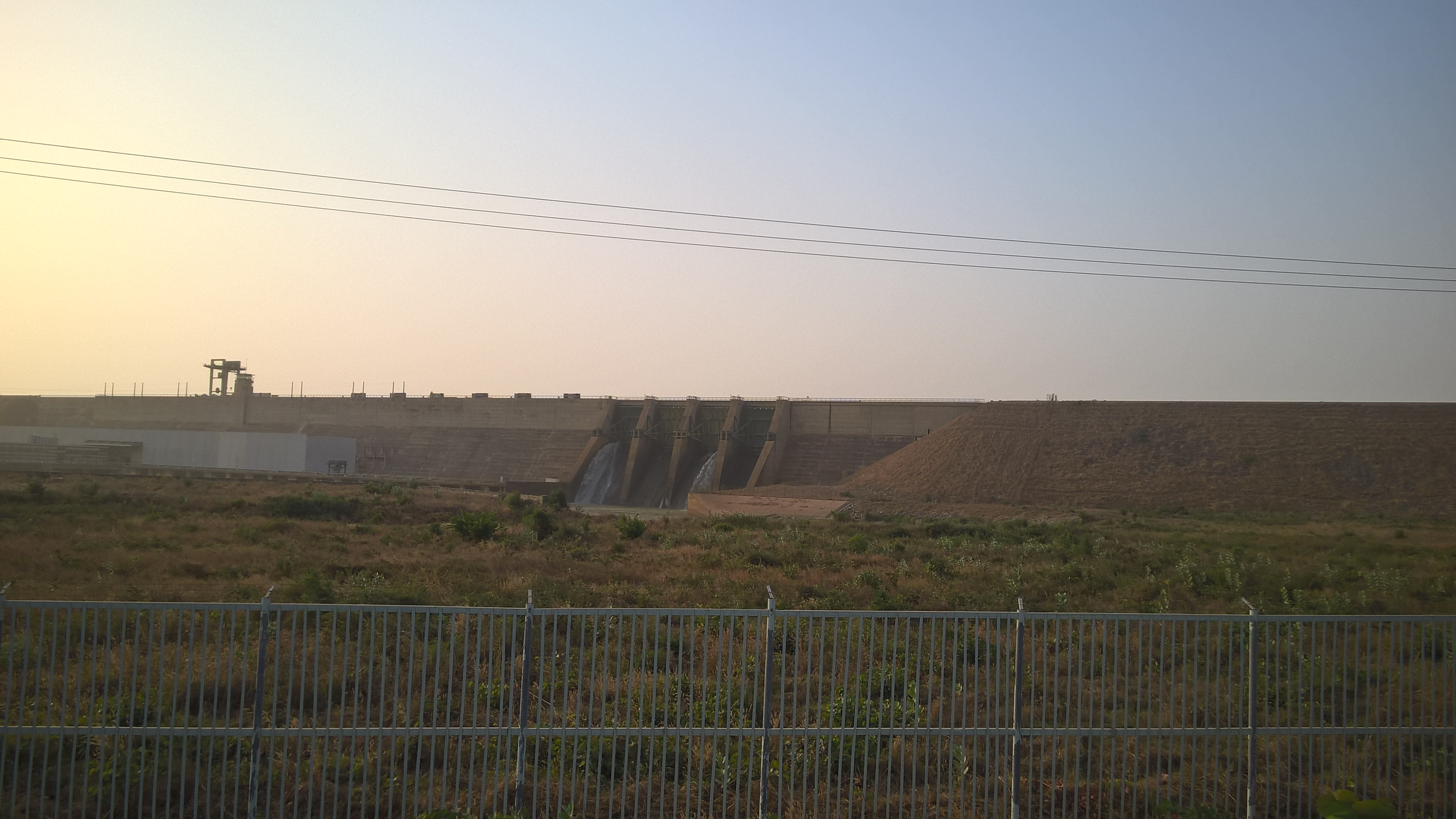

- Map of Nigeria showing the location of Kainji Dam.
- Location: Kainji, Niger, Nigeria
- Coordinates: 09°51′45″N 04°36′48″E
- Construction began: 1964
- Opening date: 1968
- Construction cost: US$209 million
- Owner: Federal Government of Nigeria
- Operator: Mainstream Energy

Dam and spillways
- Impounds: Niger River
- Height: 65 m (213 ft)
- Length: 550 m (1,804 ft)

Reservoir
- Creates: Kainji Lake

Power Station
- Commission date: 1968
- Turbines: 8
- Installed capacity: 760 megawatts (1,020,000 hp); 960 megawatts (1,290,000 hp) (max)

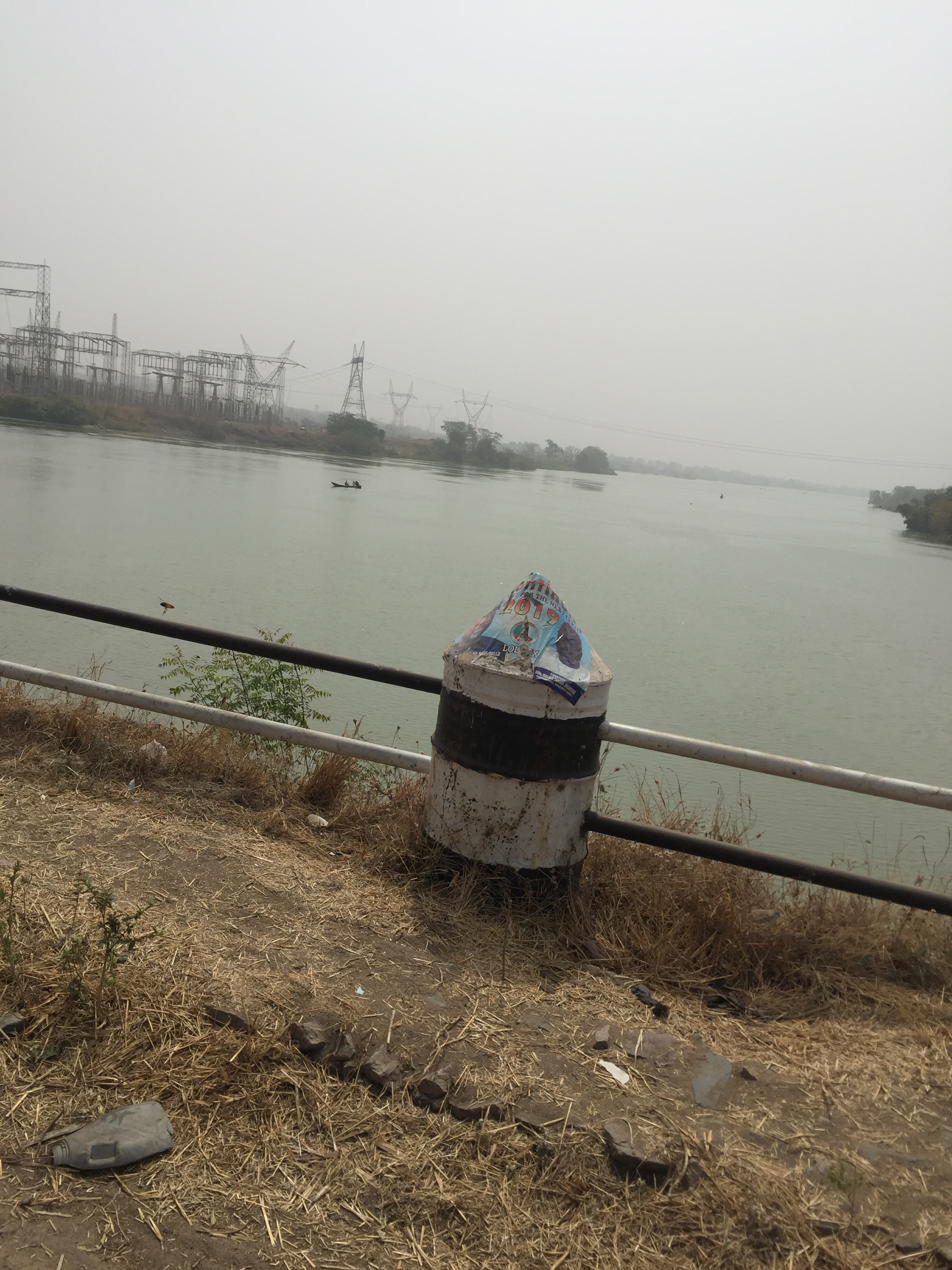
Kainji Dam

Kainji Dam is a dam across the Niger River in Niger State of Central Nigeria. Construction of the dam by Impregilo (a consortium of Italian civil engineering contractors) began in 1964 and was completed in 1968. Its total cost was estimated at US$209 million (equivalent to about US$1.5 billion in 2024 dollars), with one-quarter of this amount used to resettle people displaced by the construction of the dam and its reservoir, the Kainji Lake.

== Dimensions ==
Kainji Dam extends for about 10 kilometres (6.2 mi), including its saddle dam, which closes off a tributary valley. The primary section across the outflow to the Niger is 550 metres (1,800 ft). Most of the structure is made from earth, but the centre section, housing the hydroelectric turbines, was built from concrete. This section is 65 metres (213 ft) high. Kanji Dam is one of the longest dams in the world.

== Power station ==
The dam was designed to have a generating capacity of 960 megawatts (1,290,000 hp); however, only 8 of its 12 turbines have been installed, reducing the capacity to 760 megawatts (1,020,000 hp). The dam generates electricity for all the large cities in Nigeria. Some of the electricity is sold to the neighbouring country of Niger. In addition, occasional droughts have made the Niger's water flow unpredictable, diminishing the dam's electrical output.

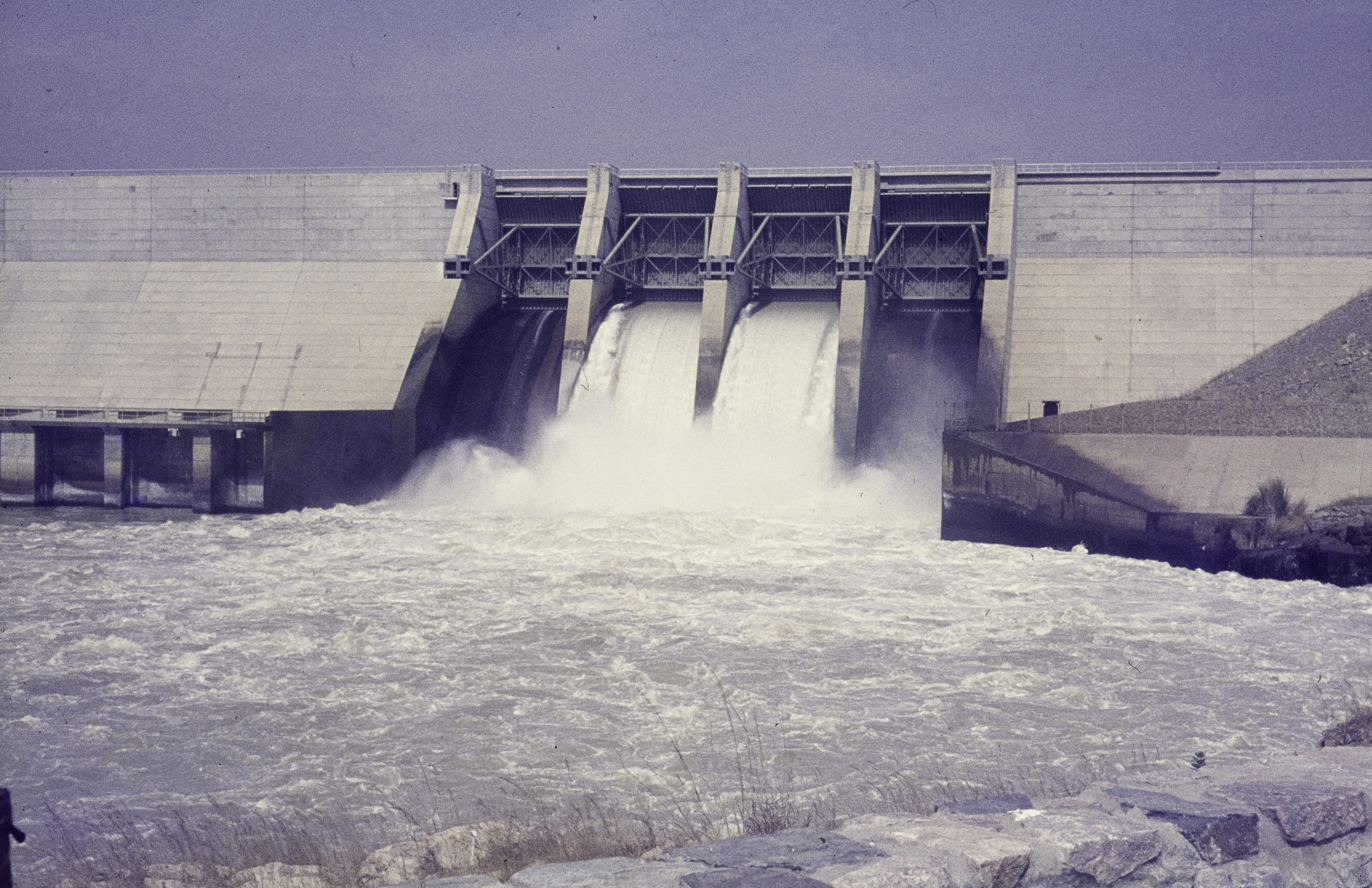
Flow of water through four openings in the Kainji Dam, 1970–1973.

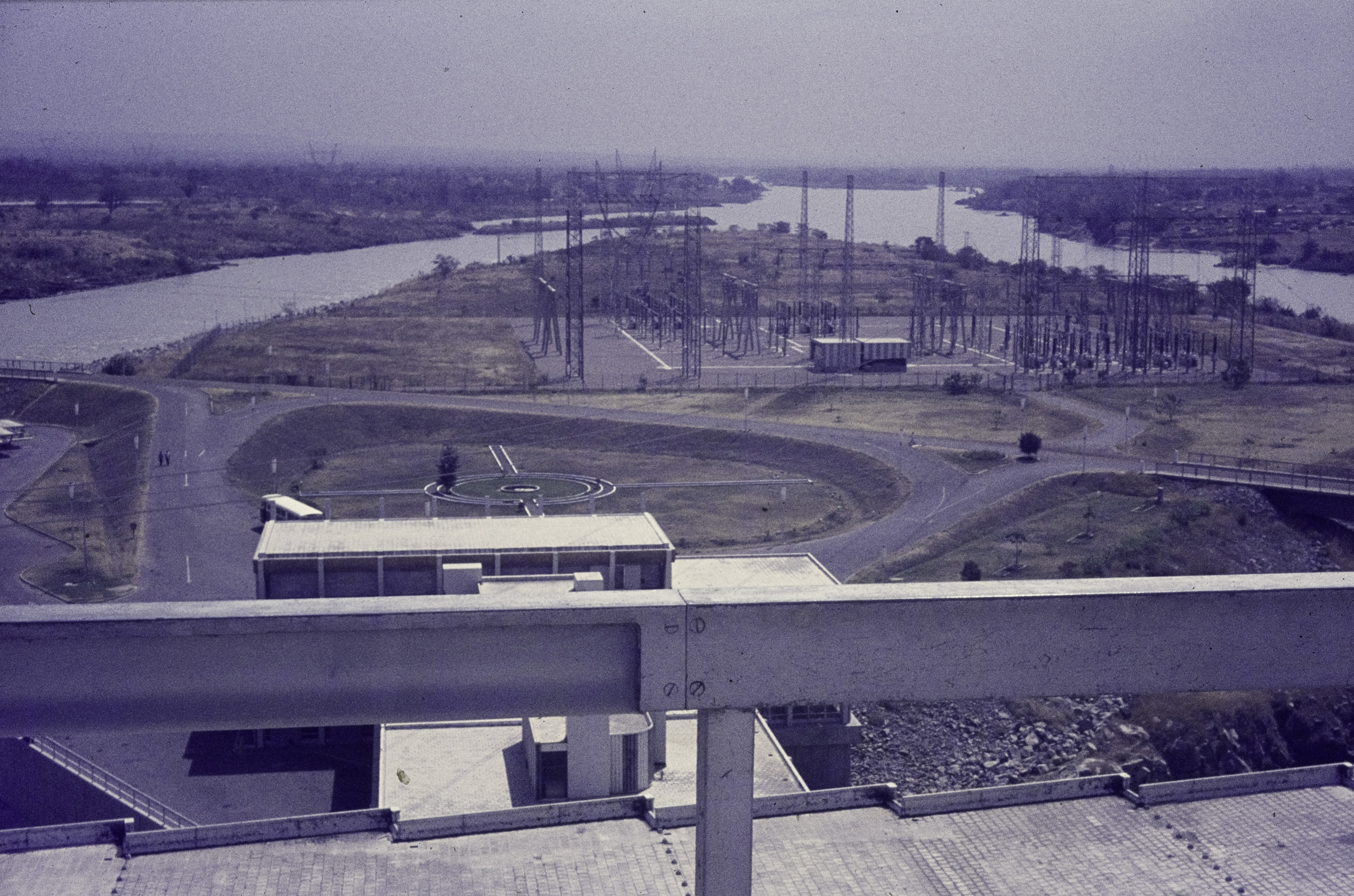
Overview from the dam of the island in the Niger River with electricity File:pylons, 1970–1973.

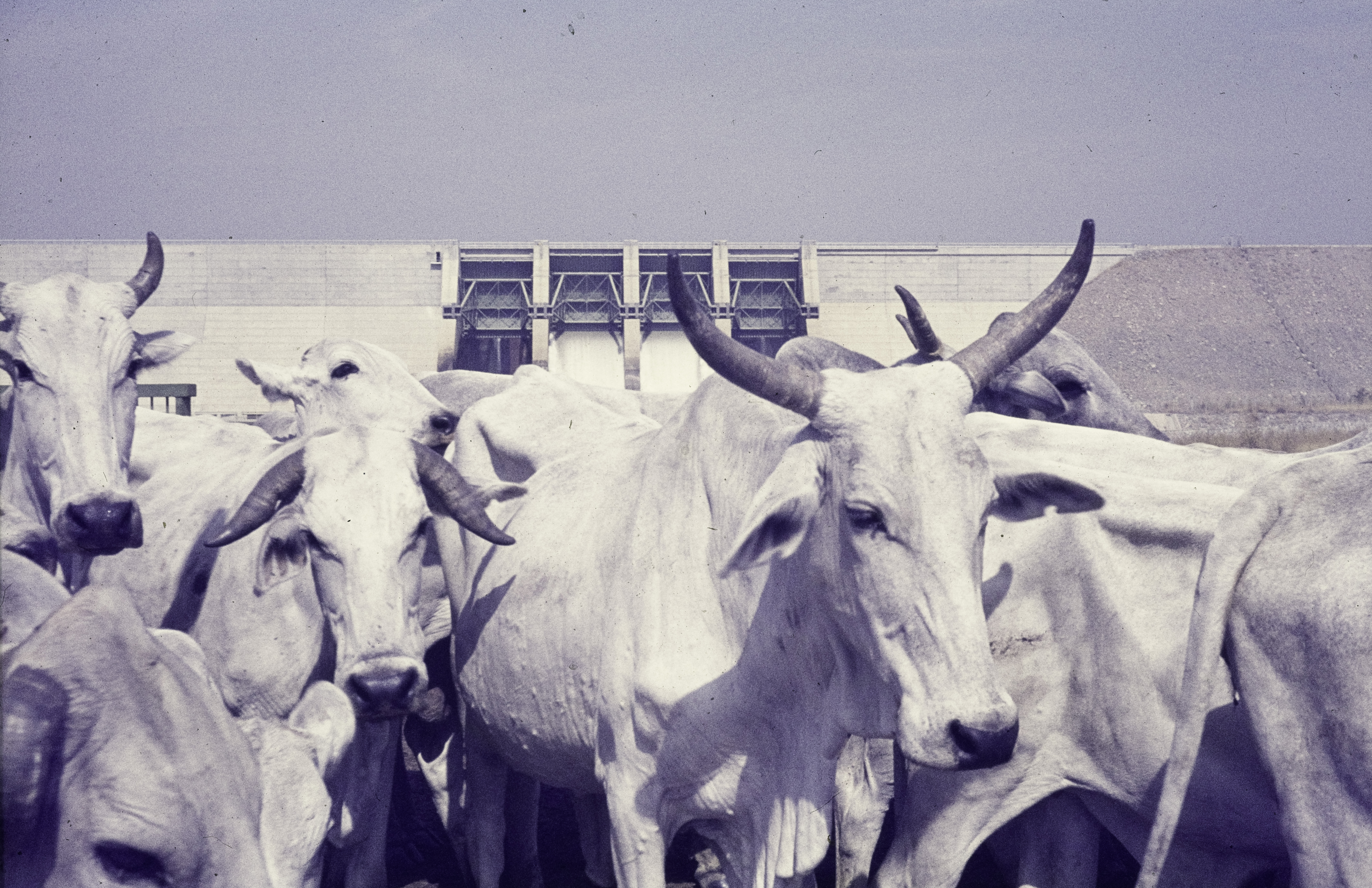
Zebus crossing the dam, 1970–1973.

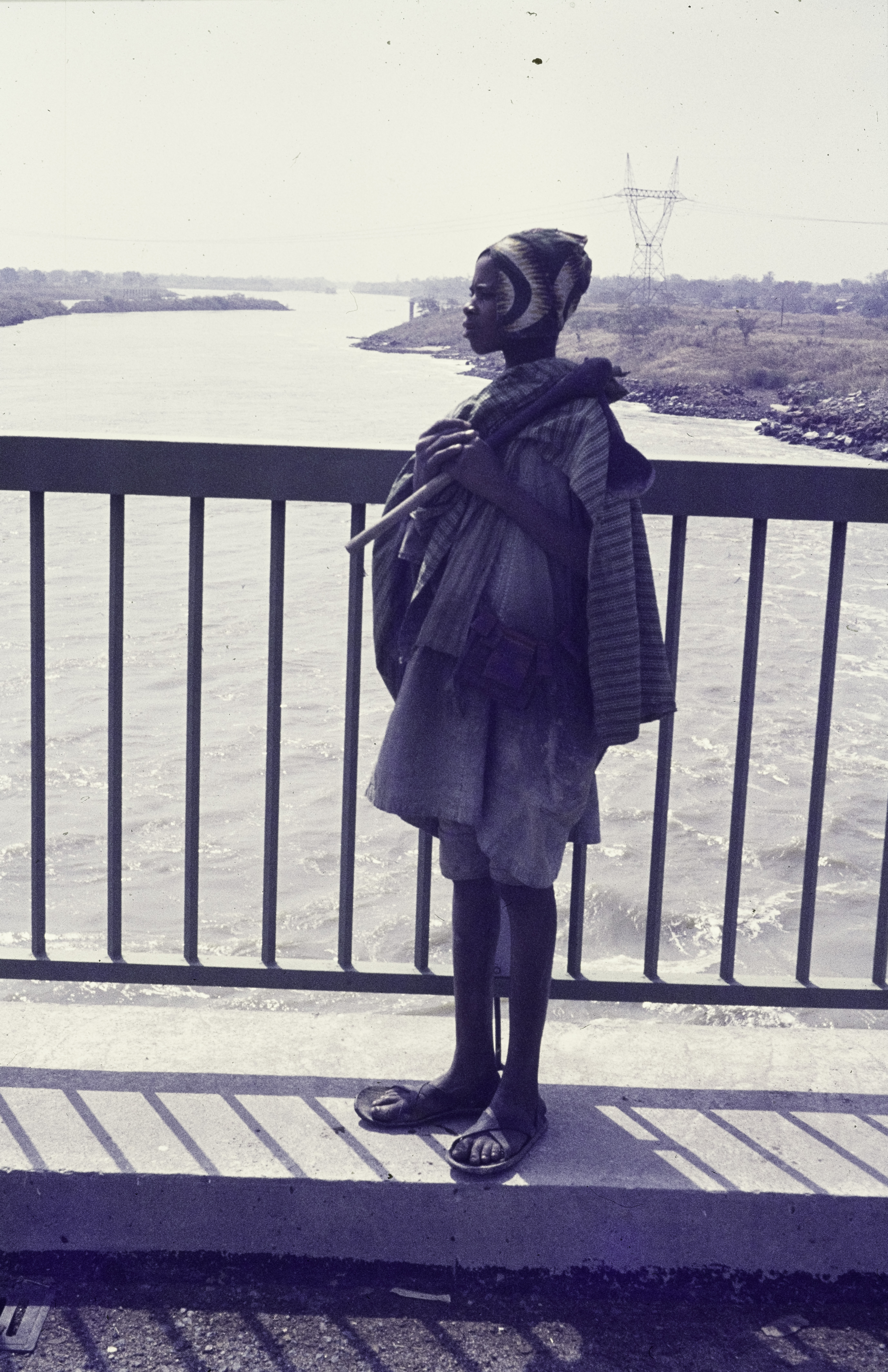
A shepherd boy at the dam, 1970–1973.

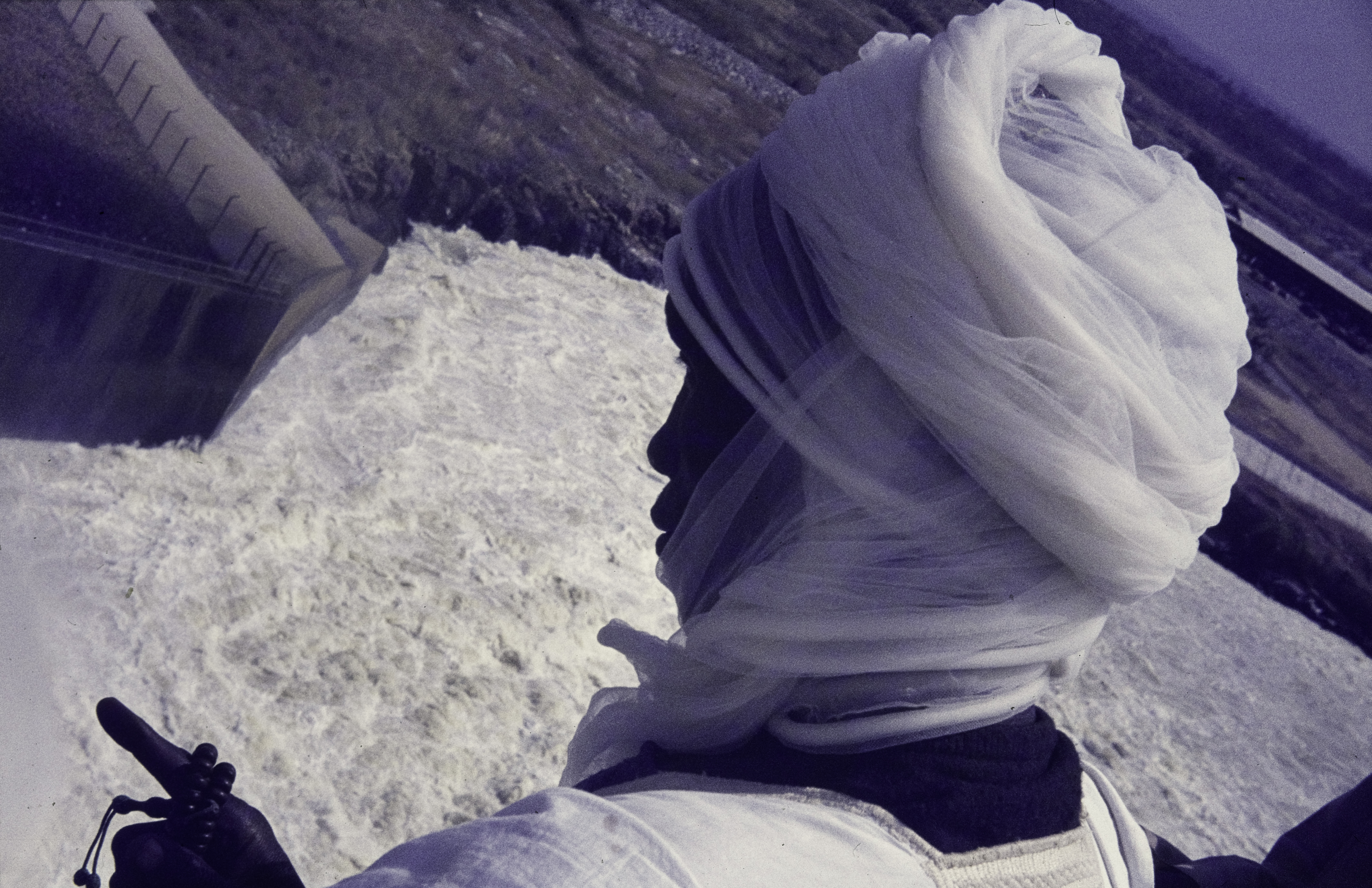
Man above the foaming water, 1970–1973.

== Lock ==
The dam has a single-lock chamber capable of lifting barges 49 metres (161 ft).

== Discharge flooding ==
In October 1998, in response to upstream flooding, a torrent of water was released from the dam, bursting the river banks. Nearly 60 villages were flooded. Domestic animals drowned and dikes as well as several farms were washed away. Dam officials were criticized for waiting too long before starting and then dumping too much water.

== Lake Kainji ==
Kainji Lake measures about 135 kilometres (84 mi) long and about 30 kilometres (19 mi) at its widest point, and supports irrigation and a local fishing industry. In 1999, uncoordinated opening of floodgates led to local flooding of about 60 villages.

== See also ==
- List of hydropower stations in Africa
