= Chad Basin National Park =

Nigerian National Park

- IUCN category II (national park)
- Location within Nigeria
- Location: Borno State, Nigeria
- Coordinates: 11°45′0″N 14°15′0″E
- Area: 2,258 km^{2} (872 sq mi)

The Chad Basin National Park is a national park in northeastern Nigeria, in the Chad Basin, with a total area of about 2,258 km^{2}. The park is fragmented, with three sectors. The Chingurmi-Duguma sector is in Borno State, in a Sudanian savanna ecological zone. The Bade-Nguru Wetlands and Bulatura sectors are in Yobe State in the Sahel ecological zone.

== History ==
Chad Basin National Park lies within the former Kanem–Bornu Empire, which existed from the 9th century to the end of the 19th century and remains part of present-day Borno and Yobo states. It was established in 1991. Before the 10th century, the Empire was established and was one of the most politically well-organised African empires tantamount to the Mali and Songhai empires. The then Borno Empire developed within the Conventional Basin of Lake Chad, where the Chad Basin National Park stands.

== Status ==
The park combines the former Chingurmi-Dugoma Game Reserve, Gorgoram and Zurgun Baneri Forest Reserves, and Bulature Oasis. As of 1999, it had not been surveyed, so the boundaries are not well-established. The park is used by many farmers, grazers and fishermen. Despite significant investment in lodgings for tourists, the park sectors only attract a few hundred visitors each year due to the lack of spectacular wildlife. By 2008, staff at the park office in Maiduguri knew little about the park, the lodgings had been abandoned, and tourists visiting the park sectors had to take off-road vehicles and be prepared to camp out.

Due to insecurity in the region, the National Parks Service temporarily suspended operations and research in the Chad Basin National Park in 2021; operations were also suspended in the Kainji National Park and the Kamuku National Park.

== Chingurmi-Duguma sector ==
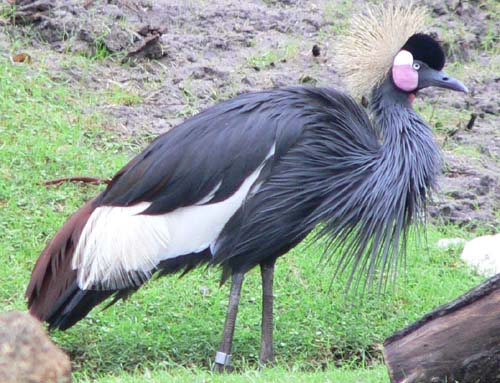
Black crowned crane

The Chingurmi-Duguma sector is in the Bama Local Government Area of Borno State, adjoining the Waza National Park in the Republic of Cameroon, around coordinates 11°45′0″N 14°15′0″E. It has an area of 1,228 km^{2} (474 sq mi), with a stratified topology. The northern part is within the Sahel zone while southern sector has a typical Sudan–Guinea savanna ecology, and includes Acacia-Balanites woodlands separated by dense stands of elephant grass and sorghum.

Waters from the Dorma river flood much of the sector in the rainy season, creating flood-plain wetlands that attract waterbirds and other wildlife. The resident black crowned crane (Balearica pavonina) is abundant, but is considered vulnerable. The helmeted guineafowl (Numida meleagris) is also abundant. Demoiselle cranes (Grus virgo) visit in the winter, as well as large numbers of white storks (Ciconia ciconia).

A 2007 report estimated that there were about 100 elephants in the sector, which may still migrate to and from the Waza park. The Cameroon and Nigerian park authorities have been cooperating to prevent poaching of wildlife and to raise awareness among the local people of the longer-term value of conservation. There have been discussions by the IUCN over making the sector and the Waza National Park an internationally designated protected area.

== Bade-Nguru Wetlands sector ==
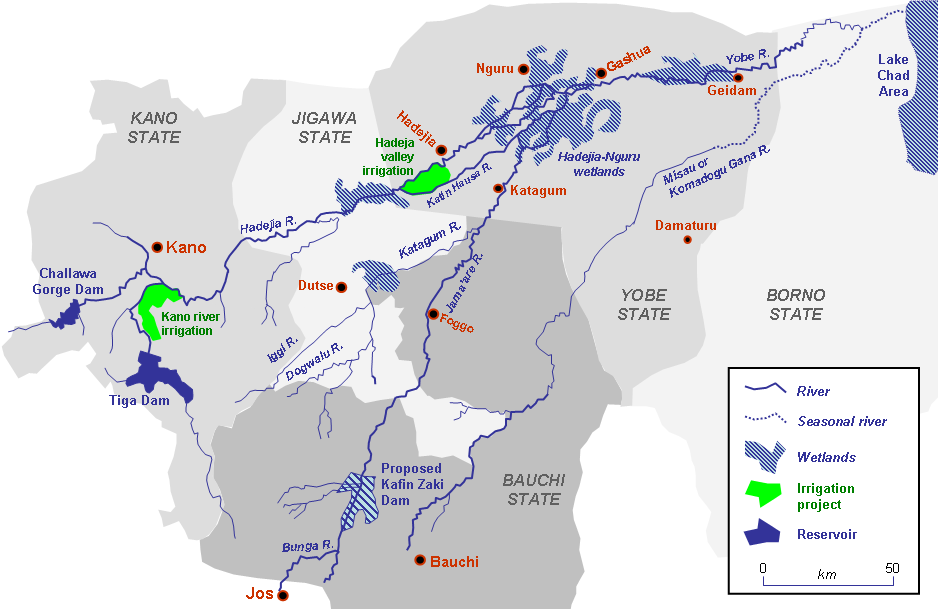
Yobe River catchment area showing location of the Hadejia-Nguru wetlands

The Bade-Nguru Wetlands sector is part of the Hadejia-Nguru wetlands, and has an area of 938 km^{2} around coordinates 12°40′0″N 10°30′0″E. It lies in the southwest of the Bade and Jakusko Local Government Areas of Yobe State. The sector includes the Dagona Waterfowl Sanctuary, an important resting place for migratory birds. It also includes five forest reserves.

Annual rainfall ranges between 200–600 mm, during the period late May–September. With reduced flooding due to upstream dams and perhaps climate change, and with increasing population, the environment is degrading. There is growing competition between humans and wildlife. Farmers set out poison to kill the crop-destroying Quelea quelea, in the process killing non-target species. Marginal land is now coming under cultivation and tree cover in the forest reserves is being depleted.

== Bulatura sector ==
The Bulatura sector is in the Yusufari Local Government Area of Yobe State, and has an area of 92 km^{2} around coordinates 13°15′0″N 11°00′0″E. The sector has a series of swampy valleys separated by scenic sand dunes. The valleys contain rich deposits of potash.
