= Okeluse Forest Reserve =

Tourist and conservation site in Nigeria

- Location within Nigeria
- Location: Nigeria
- Coordinates: 6.7876°N 5.5868°E
- Area: 144 km^{2} (56 sq mi)

The Okeluse Forest Reserve is situated in Okeluse, an agrarian community in Ose Local Government Area of Ondo State, South West, Nigeria, West Africa. It covers 144 square kilometres (56 sq mi). It is a major forest reserve in Nigeria

The estimate terrain elevation above sea level is 68 metres (223 ft).Okeluse Forest Reserve performs such functions as primary habitats of the forest, sustainable wood production, and also provision of vital economic, social and environmental benefits.

== Impact of Anthropogenic Activities on Forests ==
Increasing anthropogenic activities arising from population increases place a high demand on the forest and its resources for survival, and these lead to degradation, fragmentation and conversion of forest to other land uses

Among such human activities that lead to forest loss in Nigeria are commodity-led deforestation, extension of agriculture, and urbanization and this threatens the survival of species of fauna such as chimpanzees (Pan troglodytes)

Land-use and cover changes also impact negatively on the diversity of species of fauna and flora
