= Kashimbila Game Reserve =

- IUCN category IV (habitat/species management area)
- Location within Nigeria
- Location: Taraba State, Nigeria
- Coordinates: 6.8865°N 9.8652°E
- Area: 1,396 km^{2} (539 sq mi)

The Kashimbila Game Reserve is found in Taraba State, Nigeria. It was established in 1977. The site is 1396 km^{2}.
