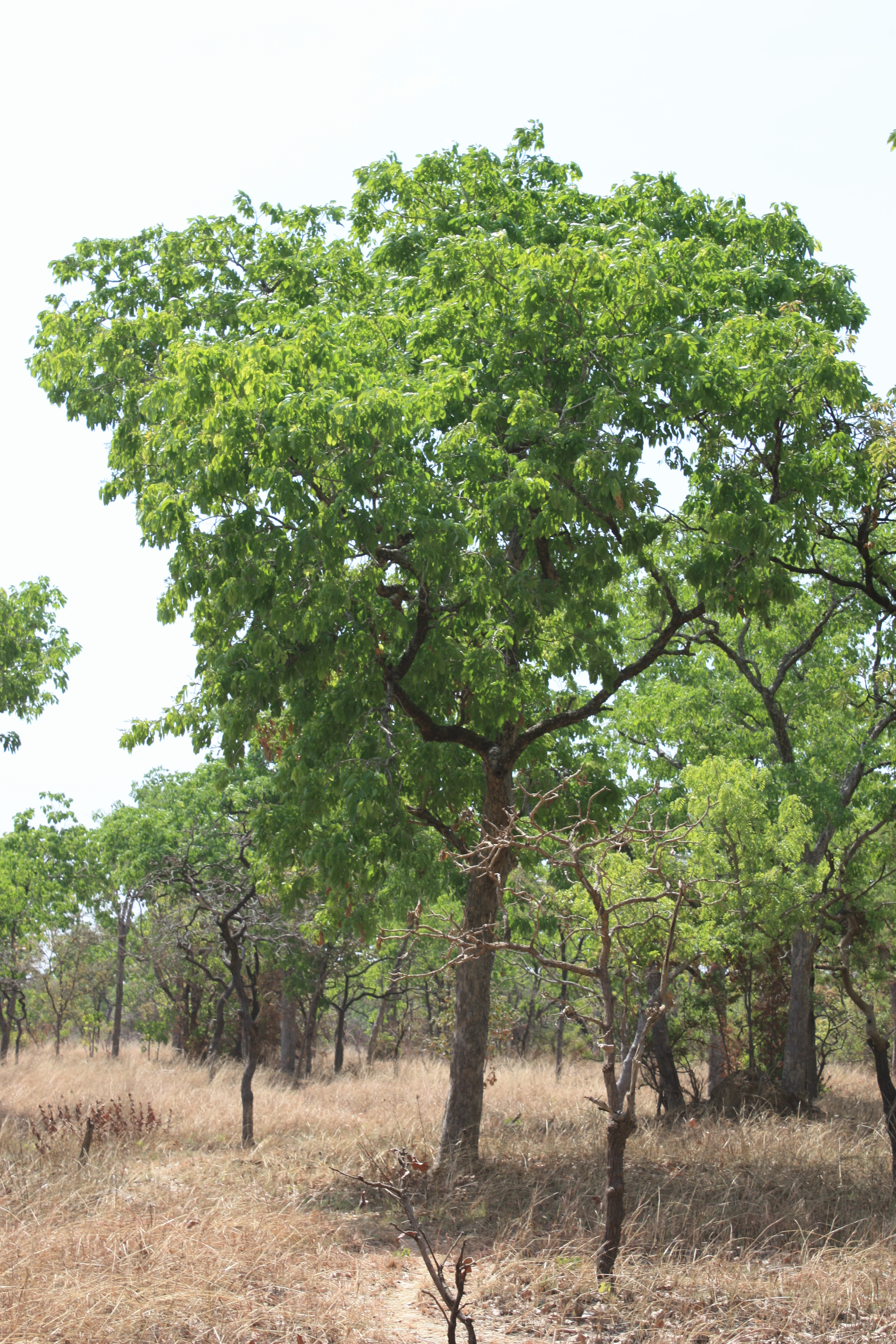
- Isoberlinia doka

Scientific classification
- Kingdom: Plantae
- Clade: Tracheophytes
- Clade: Angiosperms
- Clade: Eudicots
- Clade: Rosids
- Order: Fabales
- Family: Fabaceae
- Subfamily: Detarioideae
- Tribe: Amherstieae
- Genus: Isoberlinia; Craib & Stapf

Species
- Isoberlinia angolensis (Welw. ex Benth.) Hoyle & Brenan; Isoberlinia doka Craib & Stapf; Isoberlinia paradoxa Hauman; Isoberlinia scheffleri (Harms) Greenway; Isoberlinia tomentosa (Harms) Craib & Stapf

= Isoberlinia =

Genus of legumes

Isoberlinia is a genus in the family Fabaceae of five species of tree native to the hotter parts of tropical Africa. They are an important component of miombo woodlands. The leaves have three or four pairs of large leaflets and stout seed pods.

Some former species in this genus were transferred to the genus Julbernardia.
