= Isoberlinia tomentosa =

Conservation status
- Least Concern (IUCN 3.1)

Scientific classification
- Kingdom: Plantae
- Clade: Tracheophytes
- Clade: Angiosperms
- Clade: Eudicots
- Clade: Rosids
- Order: Fabales
- Family: Fabaceae
- Genus: Isoberlinia
- Species: I. tomentosa

Binomial name
- Isoberlinia tomentosa (Harms) Craib & Stapf

Synonyms
- Berlinia tomentosa Harms; Westia tomentosa (Harms) J.F.Macbr. Berlinia dalzielii (Craib & Stapf) Baker f. Berlinia verdickii De Wild. Isoberlinia dalzielii Craib & Stapf

Species of legume

Isoberlinia tomentosa is a hardwood tree native to the African tropical savannas and Guinean forest-savanna mosaic dry forests. At one time this tree was disregarded as a useful resource, but with the selective felling of such valuable species as Khaya senegalensis and Afzelia africana, it is now better appreciated.
