= Borgu Game Reserve =

Section of the Kainji National Park

Coordinates: 10.041°N 4.060°E

The Borgu Game Reserve is a section of the Kainji National Park, in the Borgu Local Government Area of Niger State and Baruten Local Government Area of Kwara State, Nigeria. It is bordered on the east by Kainji Lake and reaches almost to the border with Benin to the west, covering 397,002 hectares (981,010 acres). It was amalgamated with the Zugurma Game Reserve in 1975 to form the Kainji Lake National Park.
