= Oba Hills Forest Reserve =

Natural reserve in Nigeria

Coordinates: 7°45′0″N 4°7′0″E

Oba Hills National Park is a forest reserve and national park in Iwo, Osun State, Nigeria. An enclave surrounded by three hills with a valley running in between, it covers about 52 square kilometres (20 sq mi) of hilly terrain with deep gorges. It has a large teak plantation on its western side, covering about 12% of its total area. Beyond the hills, only coppices are left on the over-exploited plantation.

According to an IUCN report from 2003, about 12% of the reserve has been planted with teak. Some chimpanzee sightings have been reported in the reserve. In 1999, a dead chimpanzee was sold in a local market. A 2009 report said that almost all the reserves had been converted to plantations and farms, with only two gullies remaining forest-covered. It is now believed that chimpanzees are nearly extinct in the reserve.

It is located 253 metres (830 ft) above sea level. The forest ecosystem supports the survival and conservation of several endangered and endemic species. The reserve plays a role in maintaining the ecological balance of the region, helping to regulate the local climate, control soil erosion, and preserve water resources as a natural watershed.

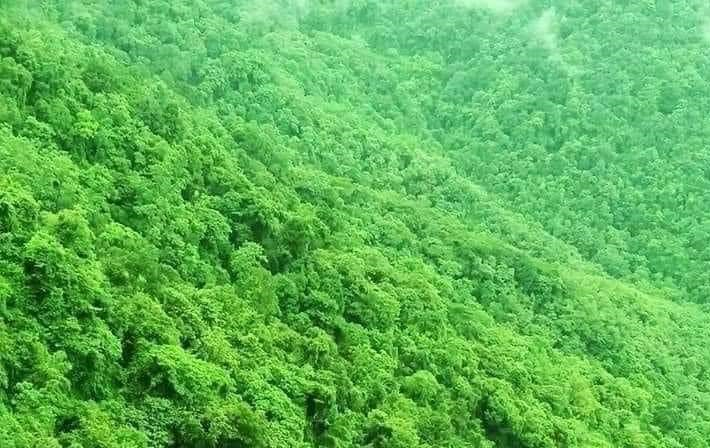
Tree canopy from above in Oba Hills National Park

Oba Hills National Park is an area made up of three hills connected by a valley. The northern hill features two gullies on its eastern side with a small area of surviving forest at its peak. The old-growth side of the northern hill has been completely deforested. It is also flanked by a steep drop-off.

The middle hill has two peaks. The northern peak of the middle hill still has forested portions near its summit and slopes. It features one forested area of about twenty-six hectares. It has a gully on its south-facing side with indications of logging and disturbance. The southern peak has been completely deforested. On the reserve's western side which is beyond the hills, there is a sizeable teak plantation that makes up roughly 12% of its whole area. Re-generation of this area is impeded by repeated fires during the dry season. Due to the demand for land and resources that result from the combined increased local population, human interaction, and economic difficulty, local conservation efforts have been jeopardized.

== Climate ==
Oba Hills Forest Reserve experiences a tropical climate classified as Aw (tropical savanna) by the Köppen-Geiger climate classification. This climate is characterized by warm temperatures and a distinct wet season, usually related to proximity to the equator. Oba Hills Forest Reserve receives the most visitor traffic during the dry months. This period is from April to February of the next year.

The climate graph illustrates the variation in temperature and precipitation throughout the year. The average annual temperature in the forest reserve is 26 °C (79 °F); fluctuating by 4.4 °C (7.8 °F) on average throughout the year. February is the warmest month with an average temperature of 28.2 °C (82.8 °F). August records the lowest temperatures with an average low of 23.9 °C (75.0 °F).

December is the driest month, averaging only 10 milimetres (0.4 inches) of precipitation. However, September is the wettest, experiencing an average of 184 milimetres (7.2 inches). Relative humidity is highest in September at 86.98% and lowest in January at 51.17%. July has the highest precipitation, averaging 25.93 rainy days, while December has the least with 2.27 days.

In terms of sunshine hours, January boasts the highest number of hours of sunlight, with an average of 8.5, accumulating to a total of 263.6 hours. Conversely, July also experiences the least hours of sunlight, with an average of only 3.15 hours, totaling 97.71 hours for the month. Throughout the year, the forest reserve receives approximately 2043.64 hours of sunshine, with an average monthly duration of around 67.32 hours.

Climate data for Oba Hills National Park (Iwo)
Month	Jan	Feb	Mar	Apr	May	Jun	Jul	Aug	Sep	Oct	Nov	Dec	Year
Mean daily maximum °C (°F)	34.4 (93.9)	34.8 (94.7)	33.8 (92.8)	32.0 (89.6)	30.3 (86.5)	28.6 (83.5)	28 (82)	27.5 (81.5)	28.3 (82.9)	29.3 (84.7)	31.0 (87.8)	33.2 (91.8)	30.9 (87.6)
Daily mean °C (°F)	27.7 (81.8)	28.2 (82.8)	27.8 (82.1)	27.0 (80.6)	26.1 (78.9)	24.8 (76.6)	24.1 (75.3)	23.8 (74.9)	24.3 (75.7)	24.9 (76.9)	26.2 (79.2)	27.0 (80.6)	26.0 (78.8)
Mean daily minimum °C (°F)	22.6 (72.7)	24 (75)	24.6 (76.2)	24.3 (75.7)	23.7 (74.7)	23 (73)	22.1 (71.7)	21.8 (71.2)	22.2 (71.9)	22.6 (72.7)	23 (74)	22.6 (72.6)	23.0 (73.5)
Average precipitation cm (inches)	0 (0)	0 (0)	5.1 (2)	7.6 (3)	13 (5)	15 (6)	15 (6)	15 (6)	18 (7)	13 (5)	2.5 (1)	0 (0)	104.2 (41)
Average rainy days	2	3	10	13	16	19	19	19	19	17	6	2	145
Average relative humidity (%)	51	60	72	79	84	87	86	86	87	86	79	61	77
Mean daily sunshine hours	8.5	7.9	7.0	5.8	4.9	4.0	3.8	3.2	3.7	4.4	6.1	8.1	5.6
Source: climate-data.org

=== Farming ===
There are farms around the buffer zone communities of the site in operation for both subsistence and commercial means. Most farming activities in the Oba Hills National Park are done by immigrants who are agricultural laborers from Francophone nations like Benin and Togo. Normally, land cultivation in the area is done manually, either by an individual farmer or by groups of farms. There is little mechanized farming in the boundary zone of the site. Large swaths of land in the area have been cleared for farming activities and development of infrastructure outside of accepted sustainable land use methods, which have notably negatively affected the local ecosystem. Additionally, this farming has migrated halfway up steep slopes, causing the overgrowing of thick scrub vegetation, and the drying of stream beds. Between 50% and 75% of Nigeria's states suffer from similar deforestation issues. Unpredictable rainfall patterns, high temperatures, floods, desertification of agricultural land, pests, illnesses, and food shortages are all consequences of climate change that affect the area. Many researchers have concluded that legislation may be needed to solve this problem in a way that takes both human inhabitants and the local environment into account.

== Hunting ==
Many species in the area are hunted for subsistence, sustaining the diet and traditions of millions of people. Unsustainable hunting practices, however, pose a great risk to ecosystems and animals. This has a detrimental effect on the people whose subsistence and livelihood depend on the sale of hunted meat. Hunting bushmeat is a customary practice in the southern portion of Nigeria. Research shows men between the ages of 21 and 40 are the largest demographic of bushmeat hunters in the OHFR. This is an activity that is usually done to provide economic security during the dry season in areas affected by economic instability. Communities in OHFR, that engage in illegal hunting, cite that their activities are not due to disregard or lack of understanding of environmental conservation policies, but are largely due to unemployment, lack of financial support, and the need for animal protein for food. Due to the destruction of large areas of native forest for development and agricultural use, pressure on individual hunters has increased dramatically.

=== Ecological importance ===
The Oba Hills National Park has both cultural and recreational relevance. It offers opportunities for nature lovers, researchers, and tourists to explore and appreciate the natural beauty of the area. Visitors can engage in activities like hiking, bird watching, and nature photography while experiencing the tranquility and serenity of the forest.

Efforts are made to protect and conserve the Oba Hills National Park through the enforcement of conservation laws and the involvement of local communities and stakeholders. These measures aim to ensure the sustainable use of resources and prevent deforestation. The expansion of this forest reserve, which has significant natural and cultural importance, has boosted the potential for ecotourism in Iwo land communities. For people who enjoy nature tourism, the forest ecosystem habitat, which is home to many different tourist attractions, serves as a gathering place. To achieve a wildlife-active position for their acceptance of the values of our national heritage, these Nigerian forest reserve enclaves were published in each of the country's six geographical political zones.

Oba Hills Forest Reserve (OHFR) has been included on the list of locations important for primate conservation. A few large mammals live there, including the chimpanzee (Pan troglodytes ellioti), cane rat (Thryonomys gregorianus), blue duiker (Cephalophus monticola), patas monkey (Cercopithecus erythrocebus patas), and red-river hog (Potamochoerus porcus), according to the Nigerian Conservation Foundation (2013).

== Conservation of Economically Forest Products and Natural Resources ==
The following are initiatives for conservation management to protect the economically significant products and natural resources of the area that have been suggested to be put into practice:

1. To create sustainable conservation programs, it is important to integrate indigenous knowledge, practices, and abilities with contemporary conservation techniques. This can be done by enlisting the help of the local population.
2. Our middle schools' curricula should include management integration of traditional and contemporary knowledge systems of biodiversity protection.
3. Young children and youth were the targets of a successful conservation education and awareness campaign that emphasized the direct and indirect benefits of biodiversity as well as the scientific underpinnings of traditional animal conservation. The campaign was launched along the protected area's corridor.
4. The management plan should include programs for forestation and reforestation that would draw wildlife to the traditional hunting grounds and preserve those grounds from bushfires together with other human activities to support the recovery of ungulate mammal populations.
5. To relieve strain on the site's fuel wood gathering, locals should be encouraged to use alternate biomass energy sources (such as crop waste, organic waste, etc.).
6. The government should encourage the effective use of forest products, the recycling of paper and wood products, and the selection of sustainable alternatives whenever possible to promote the responsible consumption of forest products.
7. To maintain biodiversity, which is crucial for the health and balance of an ecosystem, the government should work to conserve wildlife habitat within forests.
8. Eco-friendly tourism that minimizes environmental impact should be encouraged.

=== Encroachment ===
Encroachment into the forest is another cause of deforestation in the area. As more people continue to be displaced, the forest may be seen as an area of refuge, which consequently leads to the degradation of the environment. Degradation of the environment is mostly caused by deforestation; the primary frontier of deforestation is tropical nations with dense populations and extreme poverty. Oba inhabitants have the lowest per capita forestland since it is one of the most densely populated countries of which native forestland is declining rapidly. Illegal logging and conversion to non-forestry usage are the main causes of the woods' decline. The socioeconomic causes and patterns of encroachment were found to be a lack of available land and unemployment. It is recommended that if action is not taken within the next three decades, the natural forests that are already in place at risk of being encroached upon will turn into serious problems.

== Access ==
The closest airport to the reserve is Ibadan Airport; international visitors typically fly to Lagos International Airport first.

The drive from Ibadan Airport takes around two hours.
