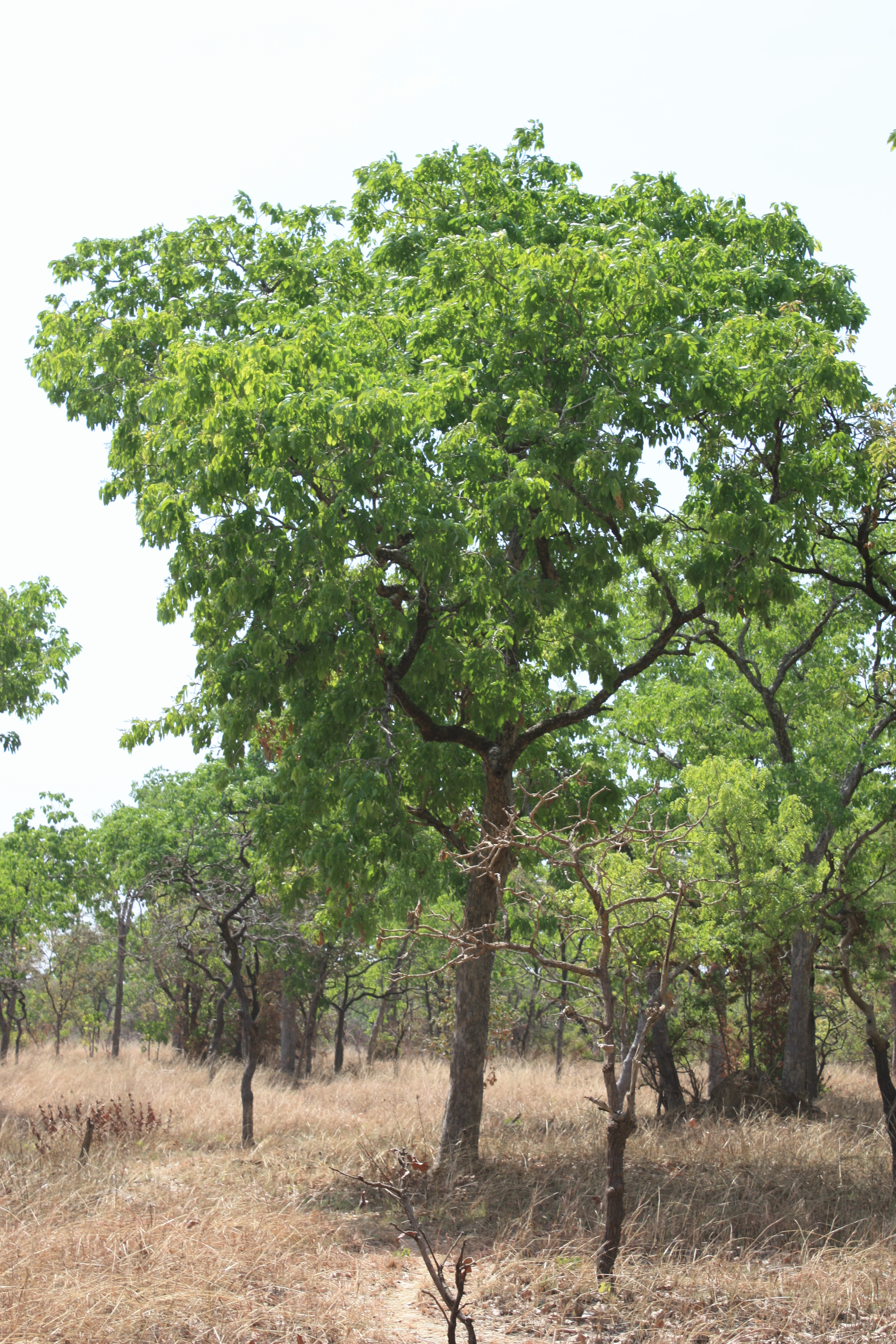
- Dry forest of Isoberlinia doka in Comoé-Léraba Reserve, Burkina Faso

Conservation status
- Least Concern (IUCN 3.1)

Scientific classification
- Kingdom: Plantae
- Clade: Tracheophytes
- Clade: Angiosperms
- Clade: Eudicots
- Clade: Rosids
- Order: Fabales
- Family: Fabaceae
- Genus: Isoberlinia
- Species: I. doka

Binomial name
- Isoberlinia doka Craib & Stapf

= Isoberlinia doka =

Species of legume

Isoberlinia doka is a hardwood tree native to African tropical savannas and Guinean forest-savanna mosaic dry forests where it can form single species stands. The tree is exploited for its economic value as a commercial timber. The leaves and shoots of the tree dominate the diet of the Giant Eland in its range. The tree is a host plant for Anaphe moloneyi (superfamily Thaumetopoeidae), one of the caterpillars that produces a wild silk, sayan, local to parts of Nigeria.
