= Oli River =

River in Benin/Nigeria

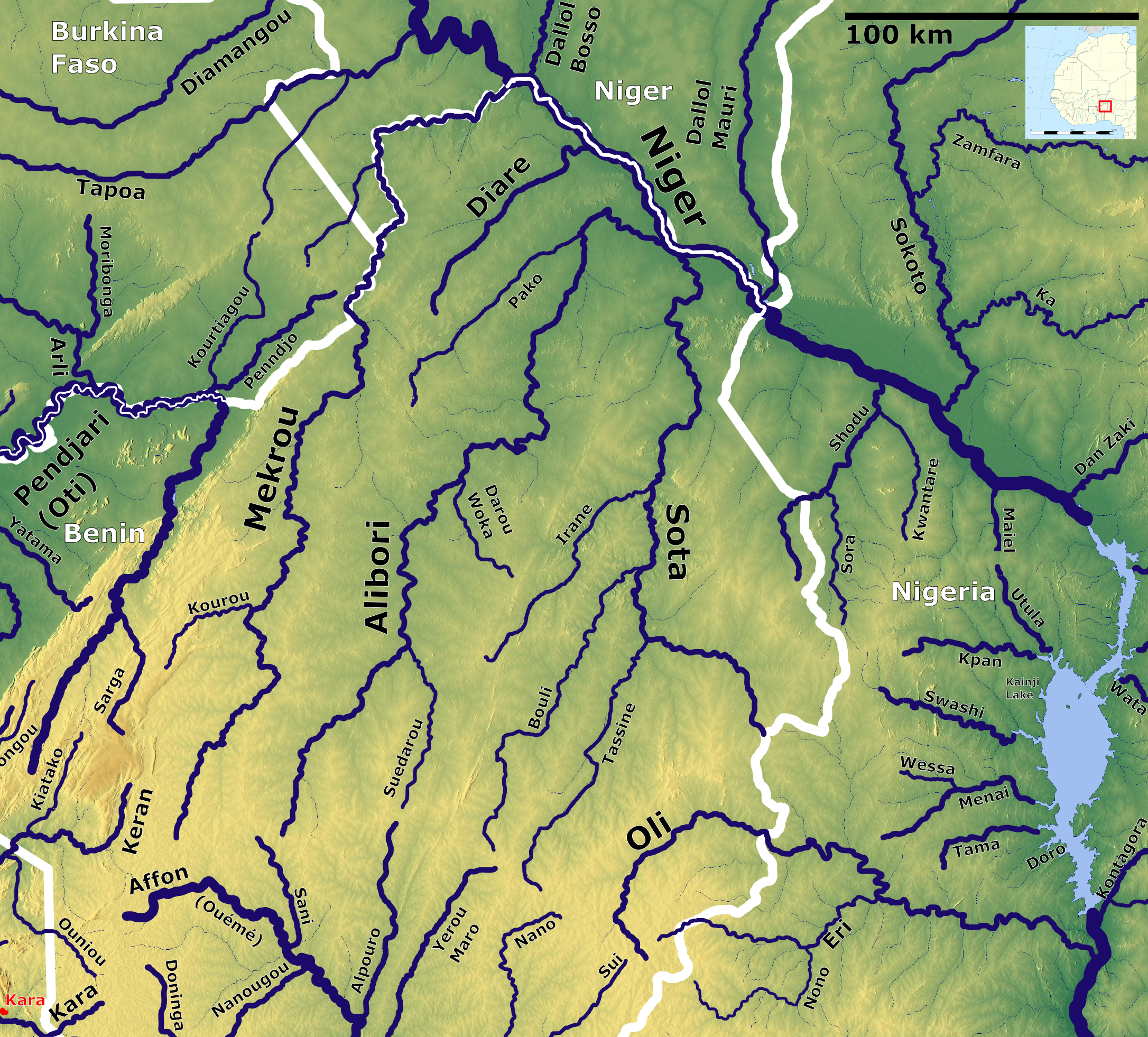
North Benin with the Oli in the south east

The Oli River is a river of Nigeria and Benin, tributary of the Niger River.
