= Zugurma Game Reserve =

Game reserve in Nigeria

Coordinates: 9°50′N 5°00′E

The Zugurma Game Reserve is a section of the Kainji National Park, in the Mariga Local Government Area of Niger State, Nigeria. It is bordered by the Kontagora River to the northwest and the Manyara River to the north, and covers an area of 138,500 hectares (342,000 acres; 535 mi^{2}). It was amalgamated with the Borgu Game Reserve in 1975 to form the Kainji Lake National Park.

The reserve consists of a low plateau with gradually sloping sides forming an east to west watershed. It is poorly drained, with no tributaries running into the Manyara River, and with the Yampere and Lanser rivers running only seasonally. The vegetation is typically Guinea savanna woodland, but has been badly over-grazed except for riparian forests along the Manyara River and other water holes. The reserve has received virtually no research attention.
