= Tourism in Nigeria =

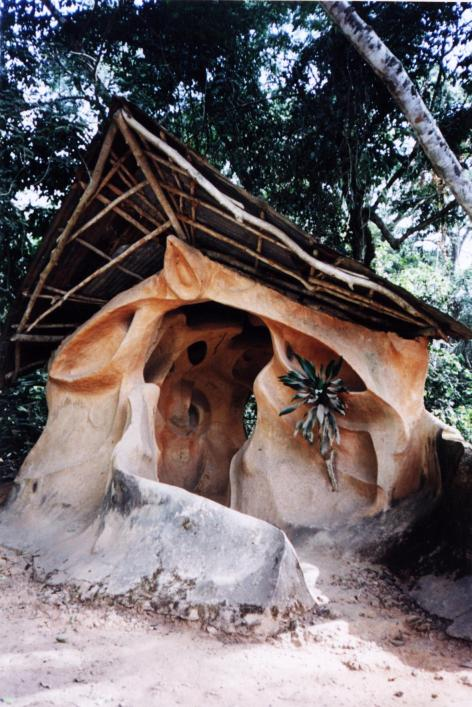
The temple of Yoruba goddess Oshun at Osun-Osogbo, an attraction for pilgrims and tourists alike

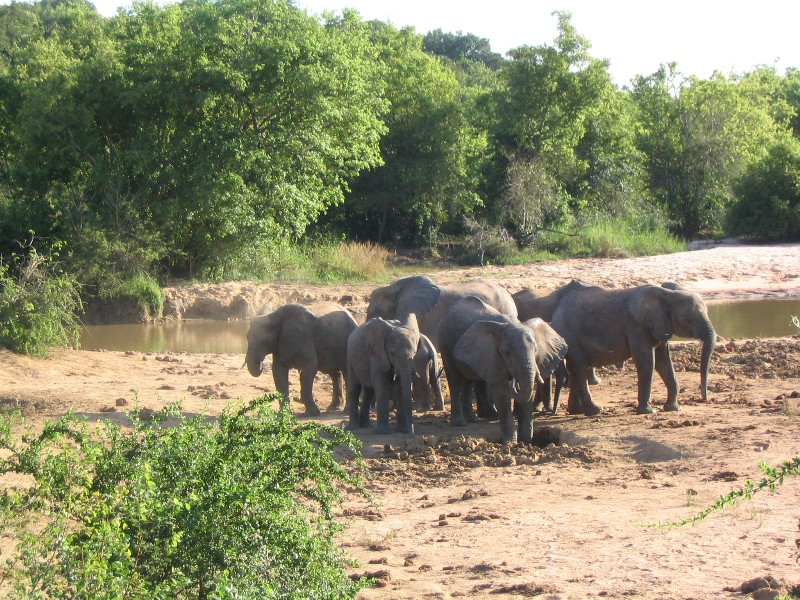
African bush elephants in Yankari National Park, Bauchi State

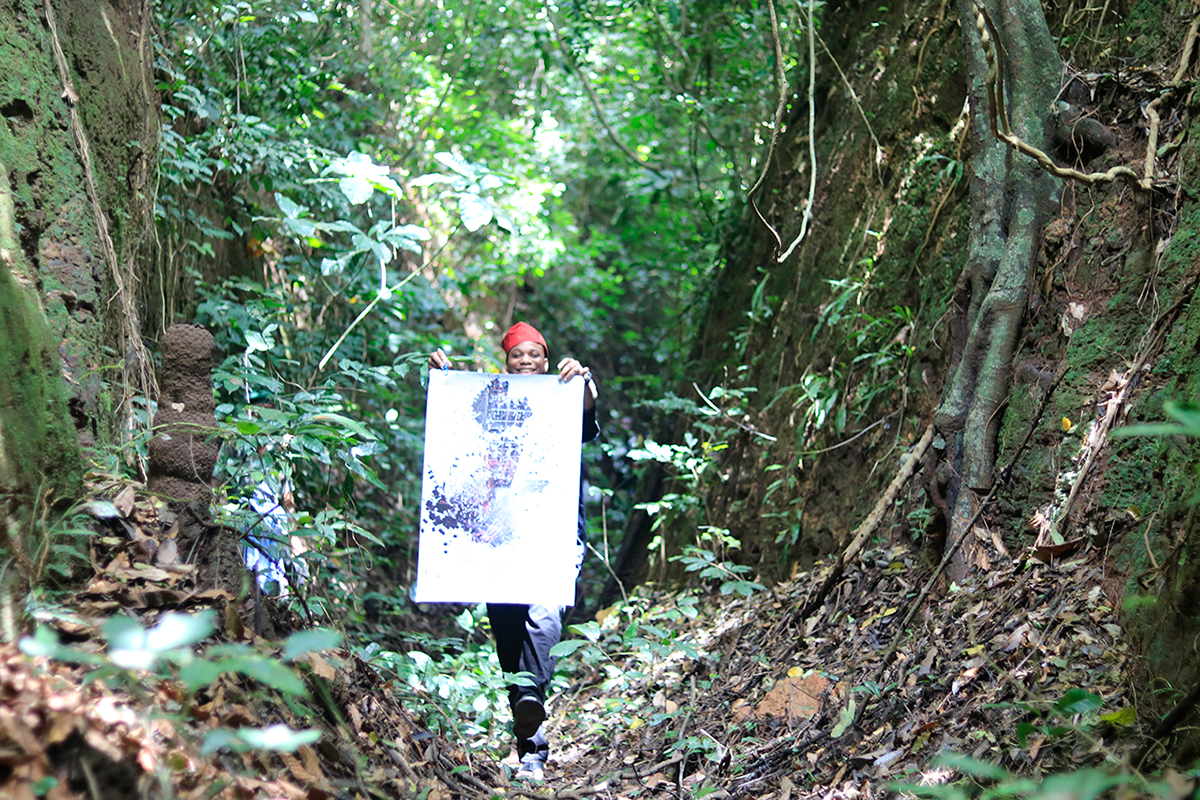
Multidisciplinary technologist Ade Olufeko inside Sungbo's Eredo in 2017

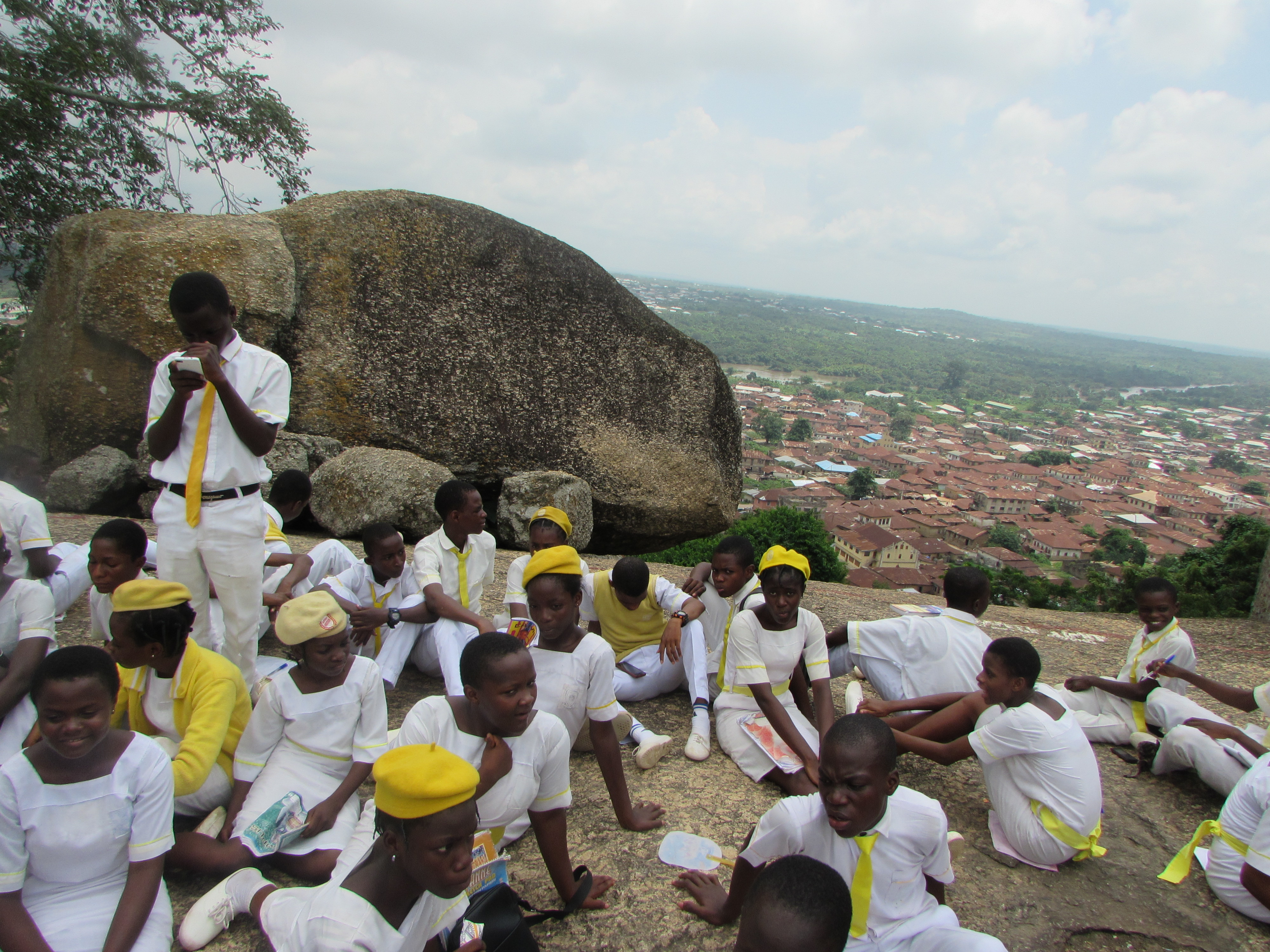
Students of the African Church on an excursion to the Olumo Rock

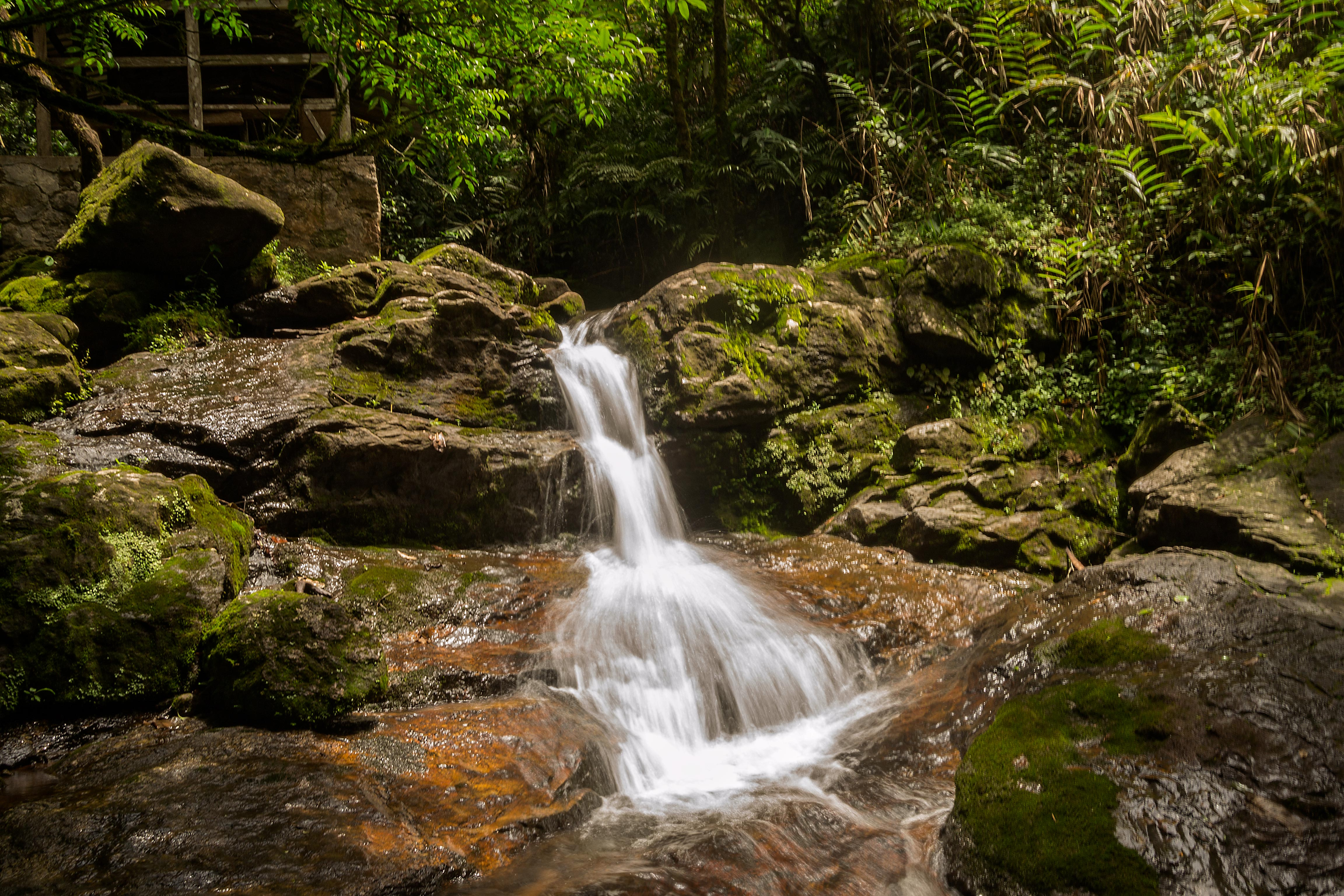
Mini waterfall at the grotto in Becheve Nature Reserve

Tourism in Nigeria remains largely untapped, despite the dramatic devaluation of the country’s currency, the naira, in 2023, its numerous attractive sights and its hospitable people. The World Travel and Tourism Council (WTTC) estimates Nigeria’s revenue from 2025 at US$7.5 billion, representing a three per cent increase compared with 2024 (in Africa, tourism grew by ten per cent over the same period). The tourism sector therefore accounts for three per cent of Nigeria’s GDP.

According to the Nigerian Tourism Development Corporation (NTDC), Nigeria recorded around 1.2 million international tourist arrivals in 2025, representing a 20 per cent increase on the previous year. This figure pales in comparison with other African countries. Kenya, for example, attracted 2.5 million tourists. Apart from ‘traditional’ tourists and business travellers, the number of Nigerians living abroad who return to their homeland for holidays and family occasions is likely to be significant among Nigeria’s visitors from overseas. In December (‘Detty December’), the influx of affluent compatriots from the international diaspora into cities such as Lagos even leads to temporarily inflated prices in the hospitality sector.

== Simplified visa procedures ==
On the Africa Visa Openness Index, Nigeria climbed from 25th to 6th place in 2024 after introducing an electronic visa application system (which spared tourists the trouble of visiting a Nigerian consulate). However, high visa fees deter many visitors – tourists from non-African countries have to fork out US$150 for an electronic visa. The Nigerian government argues that visa regulations are necessary to combat terrorism, banditry and irregular migration. However, following the Boko Haram uprising in 2014, isolated attacks are still taking place in Nigeria.

== Security ==
In 2023, the Council on Foreign Relations’ Nigeria Security Tracker showed that major Nigerian cities such as Lagos, Ibadan and Kano had similar rates of violent crime to those found in ‘traditional’ European holiday destinations. Unlike in Western countries, rural areas in Nigeria are less safe than major cities. Fear of local roadside robbers may explain why Nigerians prefer to travel from city to city by plane or (where available) by train.

== A resurgence in domestic tourism ==
With 10.5 million domestic air passengers in 2025, Nigeria became Africa’s second-largest domestic aviation market. Nigeria also recorded the highest annual growth rate in this sector on the African continent (10 per cent).

Nigeria’s aviation sector is unique in Africa in that there is no state-subsidised airline; instead, there are several competing domestic airlines such as Dana Air, Arik Air, Air Peace, etc. Furthermore, Nigeria’s aviation safety performance, at 91.4 per cent in the ICAO safety ranking, is slightly better than the average for European countries (90 per cent) or the USA (86.4 per cent).

== Attractions ==
The Nigerian state that has perhaps made the greatest efforts to attract tourists is Cross River, specifically its capital, Calabar. In 2004, the then Governor Donald Duke launched the local carnival here, which is held in December due to the timing of the local rainy season. Calabar is regarded as one of the safest and cleanest cities in the country.

As the country’s leading metropolis, Lagos offers international visitors cultural and historical attractions (such as the Randle Centre), drama and musical performances (at the National Theatre and the MUSON Centre), modern art (at the side entrance to the National Theatre and the Nike Art Gallery), a treetop walk at the Lekki Conservation Centre, the ‘Upside Down House’ at Landmark Beach, and a vibrant nightlife. In 2025, the Eyo festival was revived after a hiatus of eight years.

Abuja is home to several parks and green areas with the largest one being Millennium Park. Millennium Park was designed by architect Manfredi Nicoletti and was officially opened by the United Kingdom's Elizabeth II in December 2003. Another open area park is located in Lifecamp Gwarimpa; near the residence of the Minister of the Federal Capital Territory. The park is located on a slightly raised hilltop which contains sport facilities like Basketball and Badminton courts another park is the city park, it is located in wuse 2 and is home to numerous outdoor and indoor attractions such as a 4D cinema, astro-turf, lawn tennis court, paintball arena and a variety of restaurants.

Abeokuta (50 km north of Lagos) offers the chance to climb its massive rock formations (Olumo Rock), visit the local textile market and explore the library of Olusegun Obasanjo, who, whilst a dictator, restored democracy to Nigeria in 1979, was held on death row under dictator Abacha, and served as a freely elected president from 1999 to 2007.

== Urban tourism ==
Lagos has become an important location for African and "black" cultural identity. Many festivals are held in Lagos; festivals vary in offerings each year and may be held in different months. Some of the festivals are Festac Food Fair held in Festac Town Annually by Festaconline, Eyo Festival, Lagos Black Heritage Carnival, Lagos Carnival, Eko International Film Festival, Lagos Seafood Festac Festival, LAGOS PHOTO Festival and the Lagos Jazz Series, which is a unique franchise for high-quality live music in all genres with a focus on jazz. Established in 2010, the popular event takes place over a 3–5 day period at selected high quality outdoor venues. The music is as varied as the audience itself and features a diverse mix of musical genres from rhythm and blues to soul, Afrobeat, hip hop, bebop, and traditional jazz. The festivals provide entertainment of dance and song to add excitement to travelers during a stay in Lagos.

Lagos has a number of sandy beaches by the Atlantic Ocean, including Elegushi Beach and Alpha Beach. Lagos also has a number of private beach resorts including Inagbe Grand Beach Resort and several others in the outskirts.

Lagos has a variety of hotels ranging from three star to five star hotels, with a mixture of local hotels such as Eko Hotels and Suites, Federal Palace Hotel and franchises of multinational chains such as Intercontinental Hotel, Sheraton and Four Points by Hilton. Other places of interest include the Tafawa Balewa Square, Festac town, The Nike Art Gallery, Freedom Park, Lagos and the Cathedral Church of Christ, Lagos.

== Resorts and regional tourism ==
Obudu Mountain Resort is a ranch and resort on the Obudu Plateau in Cross River State. It was developed in 1951 by M. McCaughley, a Scot who first explored the mountain ranges in 1949. He camped on the mountaintop of the Oshie Ridge on the Sankwala Mountains for a month before returning with Mr. Hugh Jones a fellow rancher in 1951. Together with Dr Crawfeild, they developed the Obudu Cattle Ranch. Although the ranch has been through troubles since, it has been rehabilitated to its former glory.

Since 2005, a cable car climbing 870 metres (2,850 ft) from the base to the top of the plateau gives visitors a scenic view while bypassing the extremely winding road to the top. The resort is found on the Obudu Plateau, close to the Cameroon border in the northeastern part of Cross River State, approximately 110 kilometres (68 mi) east of the town of Ogoja and 65 kilometres (40 mi) from the town of Obudu in Obanliku Local Government Area of Cross River State. It is about 30 minutes drive from Obudu town and is about a 332 kilometres (206 mi) drive from Calabar, the Cross River State capital. Charter air service is available to the Bebi Airport which lies between the village of Obudu and the resort. The ranch has in recent times seen an influx of both Nigerian and international tourists because of the development of tourist facilities by Cross-River State Government, which has turned the ranch into a well known holiday and tourist resort center in Nigeria.

Also, Ibeno Beach is one of the most beautiful beaches in the country and the longest coastline sand beach in Nigeria and West Africa. It is situated in Jamestown in Akwa Ibom. The city is said to be named after the local government where it is located. According to historians, the beach is one of the oldest beaches in Nigeria.

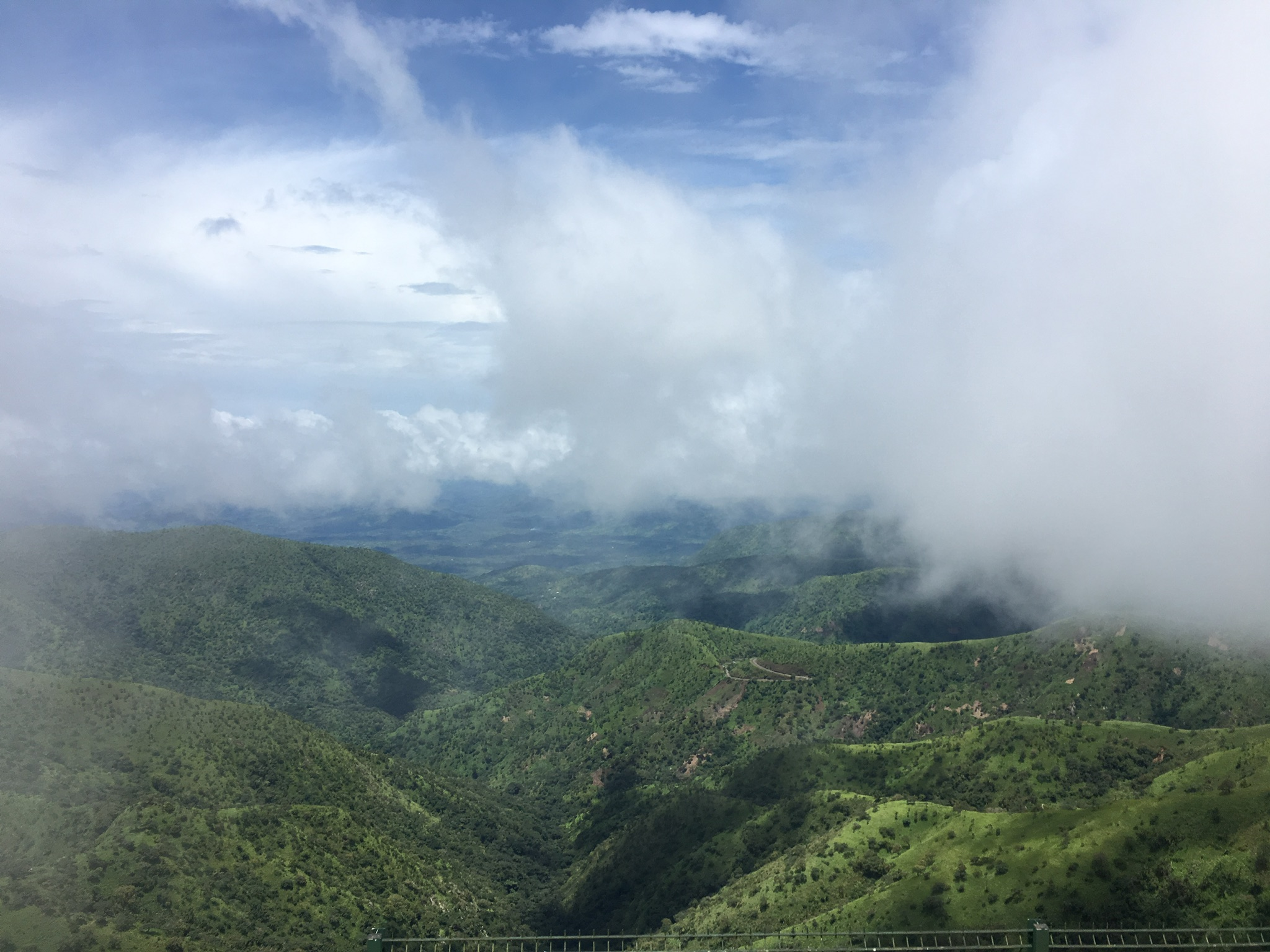
The peak of Obudu Mountain

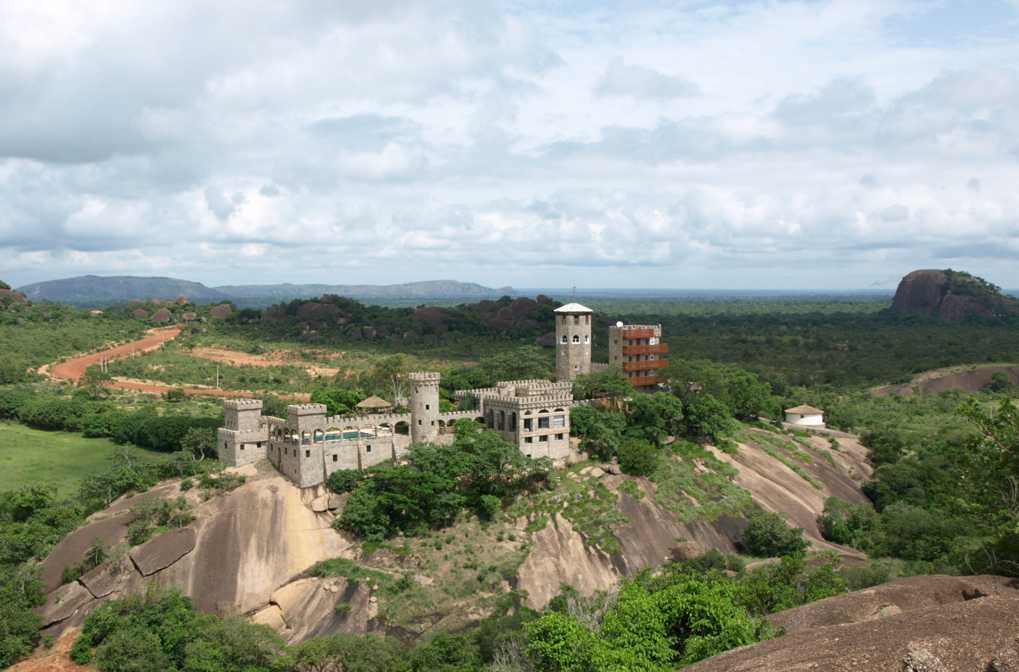
Kajuru Castle, Kaduna built in 1978. This breathtaking architectural master-piece is a tourist wonder of sorts.

== Regulation, awareness and promotion ==
The tourism industry is regulated by the Federal Ministry of Information and National Orientation (Nigeria). In an attempt to raise the profile of the country's tourism sector, a beauty pageant, the Miss Tourism Nigeria Pageant, was created in 2004. The winners in 2004, 2005, and 2006 have been, respectively, Shirley Aghotse, Abigail Longe, and Gloria Zirigbe.

A challenge to the tourism industry in Nigeria is the dearth of accurate data that are cardinal in government decision-making. The federal Office of Statistics (FOS) has not been able to collate travel data to develop and standardize travel research.

In 2017, Olufeko's research in design and its intersections with anthropology, led to a journey inside Sungbo's Eredo, bringing the rampart's narrative back into social dialogue.

== See also ==
- Visa policy of Nigeria
- List of hotels in Nigeria
- List of national parks of Nigeria
- List of museums in Nigeria
- Olumo Rock
- Sungbo's Eredo
- Tarkwa Bay Beach
- Kajuru Castle
- Tinapa Resort
- List of beaches in Nigeria
- List of islands of Nigeria
