= Oshie Ridge =

Mountain in Cross River State, Nigeria

- Location within Nigeria

Highest point
- Elevation: 1,893 m (6,211 ft)
- Prominence: 1,145 m (3,757 ft)
- Listing: Ribu
- Coordinates: 6°21′N 9°20′E

Geography
- Location: Nigeria

Oshie Ridge is found in Obanliku Local Government of Cross River State in Nigeria.The ridge is about 1,893 metres or 6,211 feet high above sea level. The word Oshie or Ushie denotes justice in the various languages spoken by the former and current inhabitants of the Oshie ridge. In fact, the name Oshie also spelt Ushie, is a popular male name for the Bekwarra, Obudu and Obanliku people.

Oshie Ridge is one of the two ridges making the Sankwala Mountains with the other ridge known as Sankwala.

== The Oshie Plateau ==
Oshie Ridge has a relatively flat top, forming a plateau on the ridge. The plateau is known as the Obudu Plateau.

The Plateau has a ranch developed on it by three Scottish ranchers named McCaughley, Hugh Jones and Crawfeild in 1951, after McCaughley first explored the sankwala mountain ranges in 1949 and invited his remaining two fellow ranchers Hugh Jones and Crawfeild to develop the ranch. The ranch contains cattle and is popularly known as the Obudu Cattle Ranch.

== See also ==
Sankwala Mountains

Obudu Cattle Ranch
