= Obudu Plateau =

Plateau in the Sankwala Mountain range in Nigeria

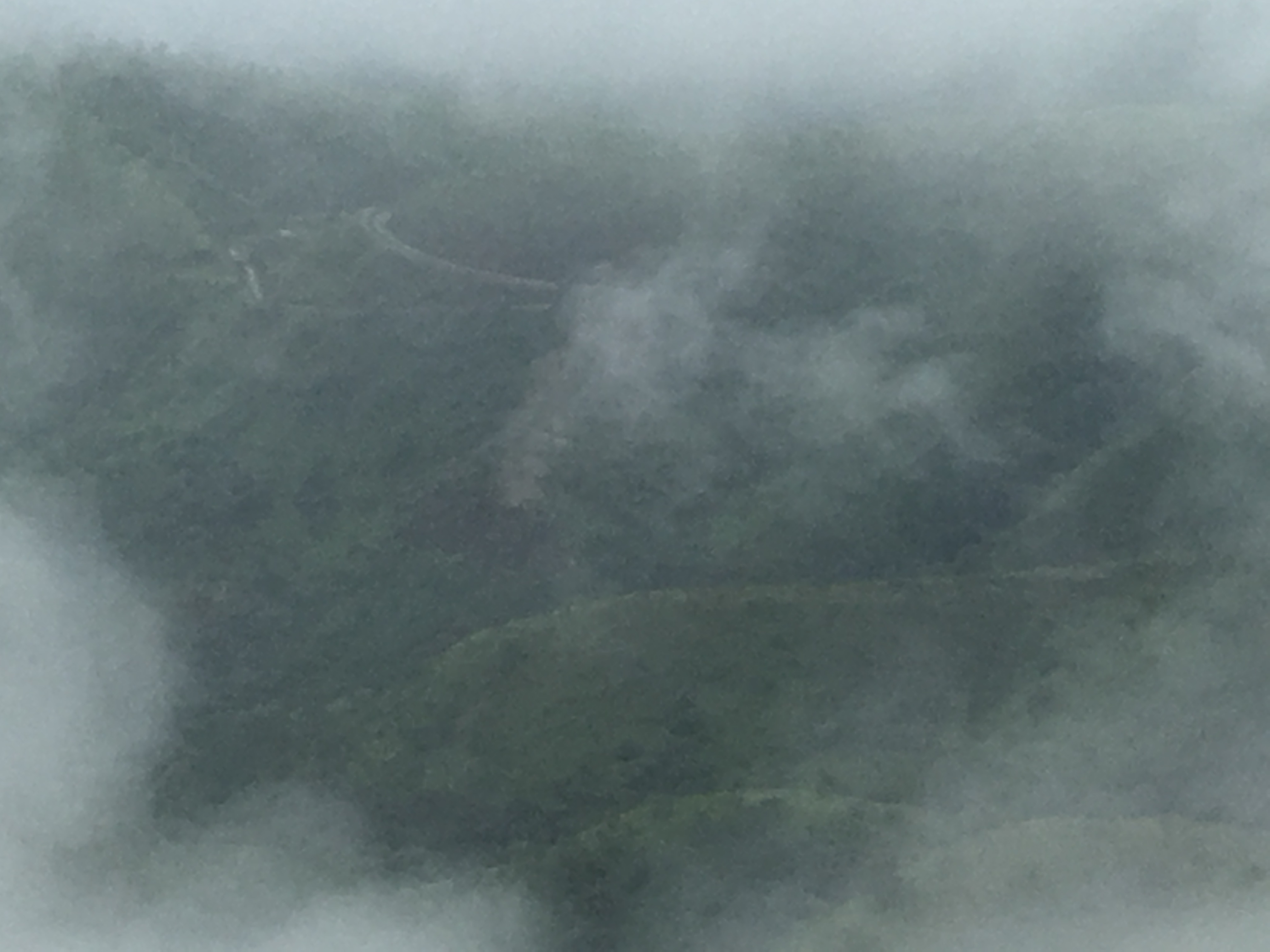

Highest point
- Elevation: 1,584 m (5,197 ft)
- Coordinates: 6°25′N 9°22′E

Geography
- Location: South east Region, Cross-River State, Nigeria

Obudu Plateau is a plateau found on the Oshie Ridge of the Sankwala Mountain range, in Cross River State, in the southeast of Nigeria. The plateau is found in Obanliku local government area of the Cross River State. The plateau extends towards Nigeria's south eastern border. The Obudu Plateau is spread over an area of over 100 square kilometres (40 sq mi) and rises to about 5,197 feet (1,584 metres) above sea level. The plateau is a giant massif in its own right, and its peak reaches a height of about 1,716 metres (5,630 ft) above sea level. The plateau is a habitat of rare species of birds.

== Geography ==
Obudu Plateau is found on the Oshie Ridge, one of the two ridges that make up the Sankwala Mountains in Cross River state of Nigeria (the other being the Sankwala ridge itself from which the mountain range takes its name). The terrain of the Obudu Plateau is hilly with deep gorges.

== Climate ==
The climate on the Obudu Plateau is comparatively cold. The plateau experiences a semi-temperate climate, with temperatures going between 26 °C (78.8 °F) and 32 °C (89.6 °F) during the dry season of November to January. The rainy season in June to September is colder with temperature lows of between 4 °C (39.2 °F) and 10 °C (50.0 °F) recorded. The plateau receives heavy and abundant rainfall during the rainy season. A total of 4,200 millimetres (170 inches) of rainfall is received on the plateau between April and November. Orographic activity is a factor contributing to the heavy rainfall. Clouds coming into southern Nigeria from the Atlantic Ocean drop their moisture content onto the plateau as the barrier of the Sankwala mountains forces the cloud upward and the resulting rapid cooling is followed by heavy rainfall on the plateau.

== History ==
The Sankwala mountain ranges were first explored in 1949 by McCaughley, a Scottish rancher who camped out in the mountains for a month, before returning with Hugh Jones – a fellow rancher who, in 1951, together with Crawfeild developed a cattle ranch on the plateau known as the Obudu Cattle Ranch. Although the ranch has been through troubles since, it has very recently been rehabilitated to its former glory by the South African Protea hotel chain.

A cable car transport network takes visitors from the foot of the mountain to the top of the plateau. An airstrip is located at the foot of the plateau for visitors reaching the plateau by air from other parts of the world.
