= Sankwala Mountains =

Mountain range in Nigeria

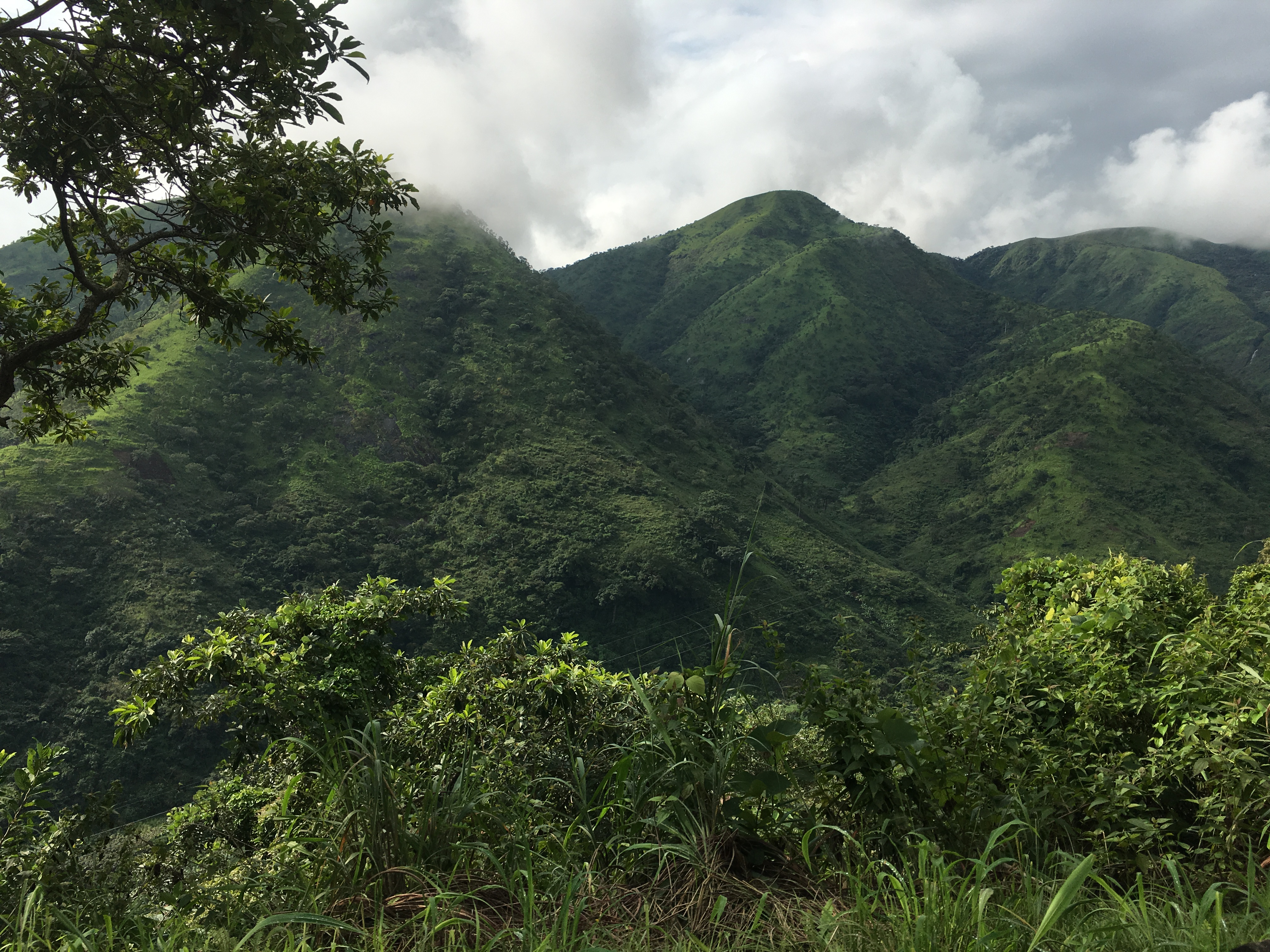

Highest point
- Elevation: 1,800 m (5,900 ft)
- Coordinates: 6°32′N 9°16′E

Geography
- Location within Nigeria
- Location: Nigeria

The Sankwala Mountains are a mountain range in Obanliku Local Government Area of Cross River State in Nigeria. The Sankwala Mountains lie southeast of the town of Obudu, north of the Okwangwo section of Cross River National Park. The mountains attain an average elevation of about 1,800 metres (5,906 ft) above sea level.

== Climate ==
The Sankwala Mountains have a cool climate. This has attracted tourists to the mountains in recent years to the Obudu Plateau on the Sankwala Mountains.

== Tourist activities ==
The Sankwala Mountains record a high number of tourist activities every year. This has led to the development of the Obudu Mountain Resort on one of the ridges of the mountains, known as the Oshie Ridge.
