= Bebi Airstrip =

Bebi Airport
- IATA: none; ICAO: DNBB

Summary
- Airport type: Public
- Serves: Bebi
- Elevation AMSL: 919 ft (280 m)
- Coordinates: 6°37′15″N 9°19′10″E

Map
- Location of the airport in Nigeria

Runways
Direction	Length		Surface
Direction	m	ft	Surface
10/28	1,790	5,873	Asphalt
- Source: Google Maps

Bebi Airport (ICAO: DNBB) is an airport serving Bebi in the Cross River State of Nigeria. It also serves as the airport for the Obudu Mountain Resort. The runway is 18 kilometres (11 mi) east of the town of Obudu.

The Bebi VOR-DME (Ident: BEB) is 0.72 nautical miles (0.83 mi; 1.33 km) off the threshold of Runway 10.

It was constructed in other to allow tourists to have easy access to the Obudu Cattle Ranch, a tourist attraction around the airstrip.

== Description ==
The airstrip is located in Obudu, Cross River State, it was constructed during the tenure of Governor Donald Duke to generate more income for the state through tourism.

In 2017, Governor Ben Ayade named the airstrip Donald Duke Airstrip in honour of the former State governor for his contribution to the development of the airstrip.

== See also ==
- Transport in Nigeria
- List of airports in Nigeria
