= Obudu Mountain Resort =

Mountain resort in Nigeria

Obudu Mountain Resort Obudu Cattle Ranch
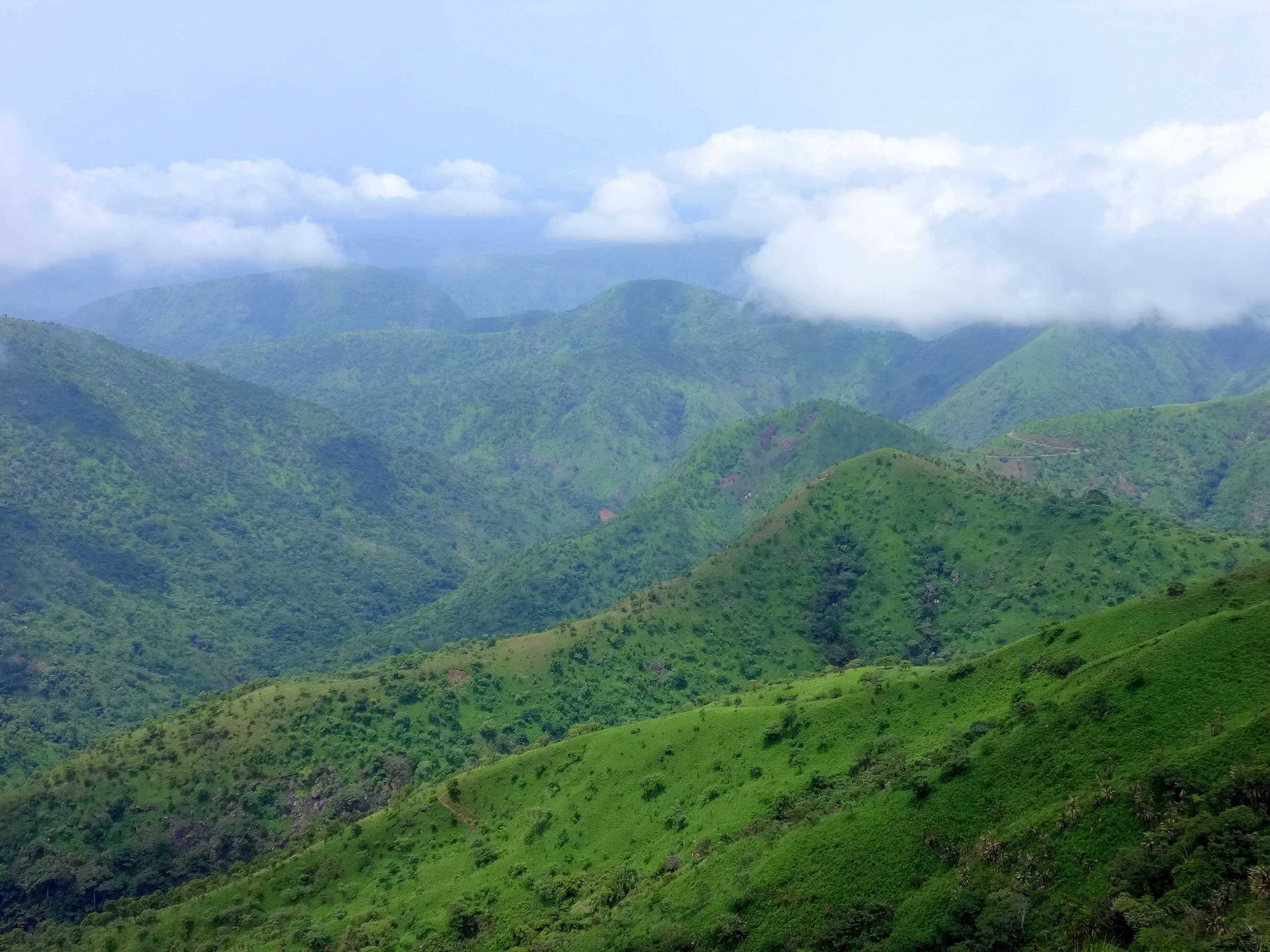
- Obudu Mountains

- Location in Nigeria
- Coordinates: 6°23′12″N 9°22′26″E
- Elevation: 1,600 m (5,200 ft)

Obanliku Mountain Resort (formerly known as the Obudu Cattle Ranch) is a ranch and resort on the Obudu Plateau in Cross River State, Nigeria.

== History ==
It was developed in 1951 by M. McCaughley, a Scot who first explored the mountain ranges in 1949. He camped on the mountaintop of the Oshie Ridge on the Sankwala Mountains for a month before returning with Hugh Jones, a fellow rancher, in 1951 and Dr Crawfeild. Thus, together they developed the Obudu Cattle Ranch.

Since 2005, a cable car climbing 870 metres (2,850 ft) from the base to the top of the plateau gives visitors a scenic view while bypassing the extremely winding road to the top.

== Geography ==
The resort is found on the Obudu Plateau, close to the Cameroon border in the northeastern part of Cross River State, approximately 110 kilometres (68 mi) east of the town of Ogoja and 65 kilometres (40 mi) from the town of Obudu in Obanliku Local Government Area of Cross River State. It is about 30 minutes' drive from Obudu town and is about a 332 kilometres (206 mi) drive from Calabar, the Cross River State capital.

== Transport ==
Charter air service is available to the Bebi Airport which lies between the village of Obudu and the resort. However, the airstrip is no longer functioning, and the cable car has been grounded for a while now due to lack of maintenance.

In 2020, it was reported that the Governor of Cross Rivers State, Prof. Ben Ayade pledged to revive the cable car after successful test running it for the Christmas period. Since then, life has returned to the ranch.

== Climate ==
The climate of the Obudu Cattle Ranch is semi-temperate mountain climate, which is the general weather condition experienced on the Obudu Plateau due to its 1,600 metres (5,200 ft) elevation.

== Tourism ==
The ranch has in recent times seen an influx of both Nigerian and international tourists because of the development of tourist facilities by Cross-River State Government, which has turned the ranch into a well-known holiday and tourist resort center in Nigeria. It has a serene climate compared to other regions in Nigeria.

== Gallery ==
A cluster of grazing cattle appears as a speck in a valley at Obudu

In the morning, fog passes over Obudu plateau. The hilly area in the top right side of the frame is where the Presidential Lodge is located.

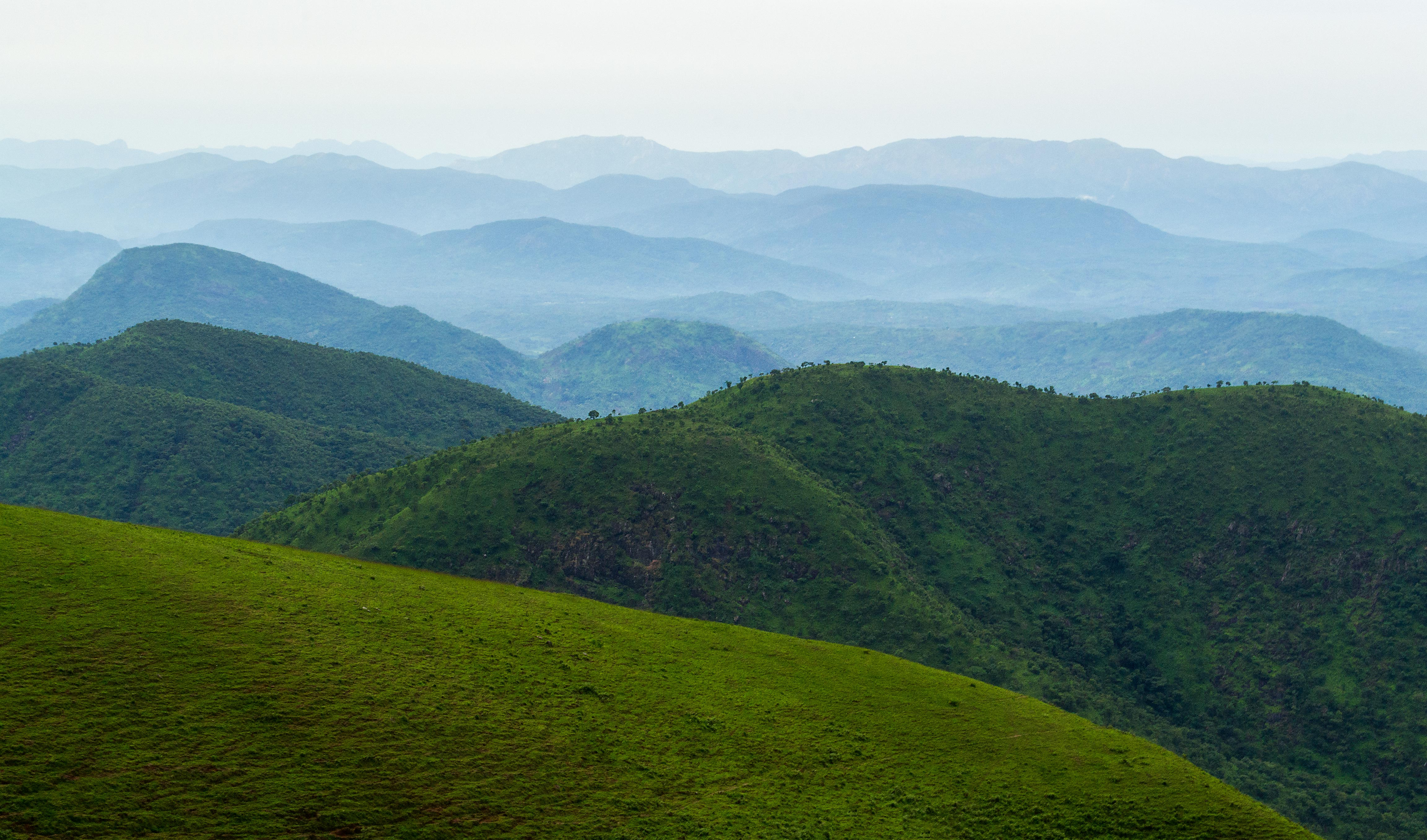
View of mountain layers from Obudu Plateau

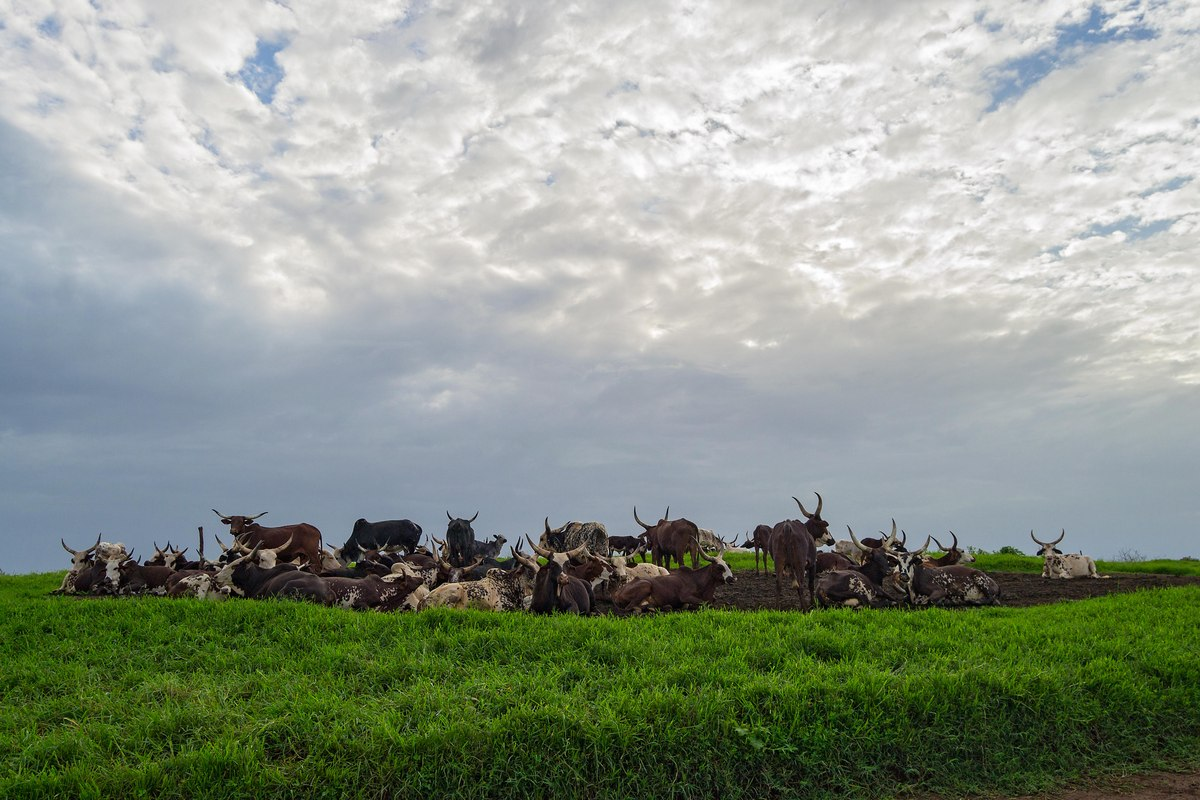
Cattle on a ranch on Obudu Plateau

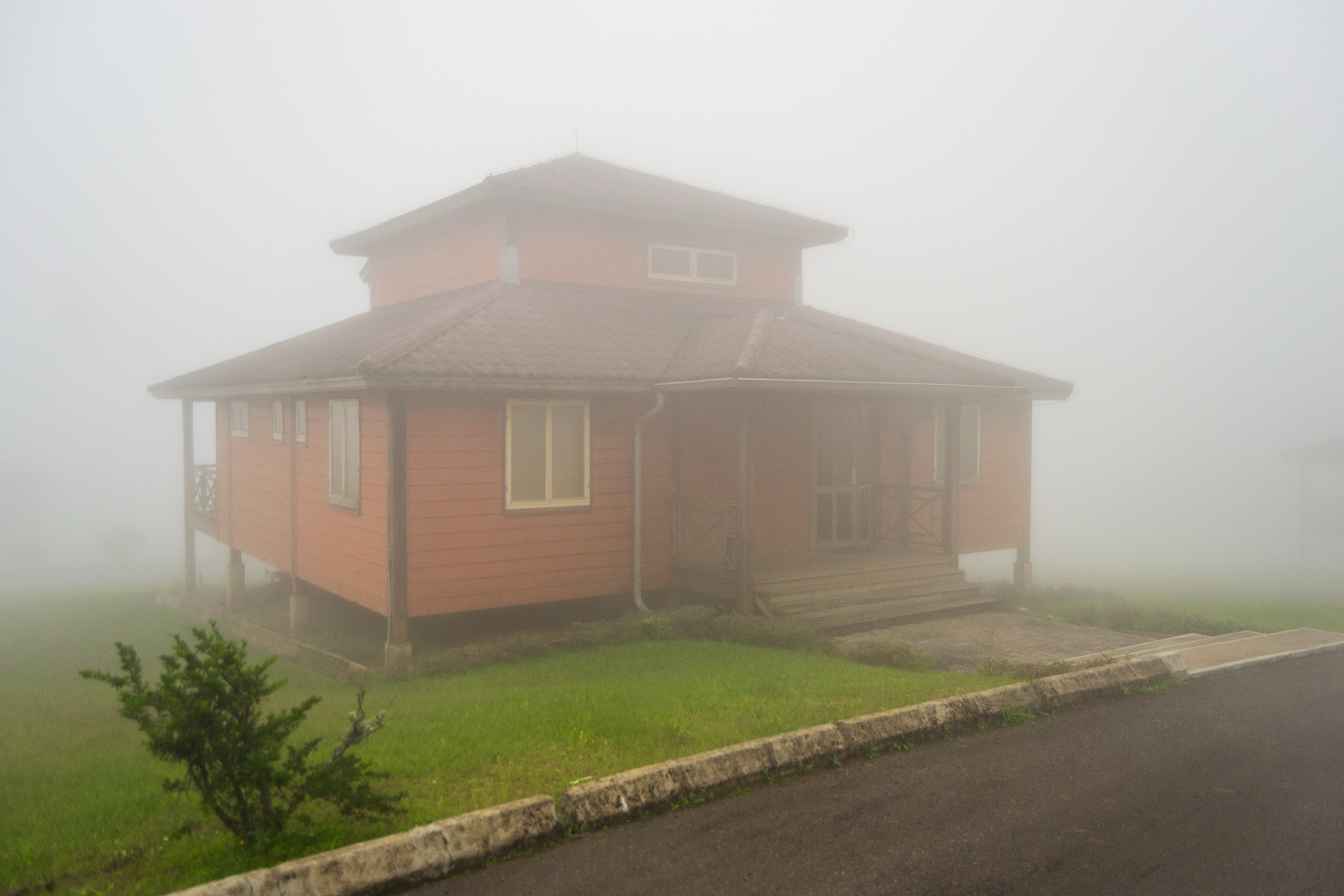
A mountain lodge is shrouded in thick fog in daytime

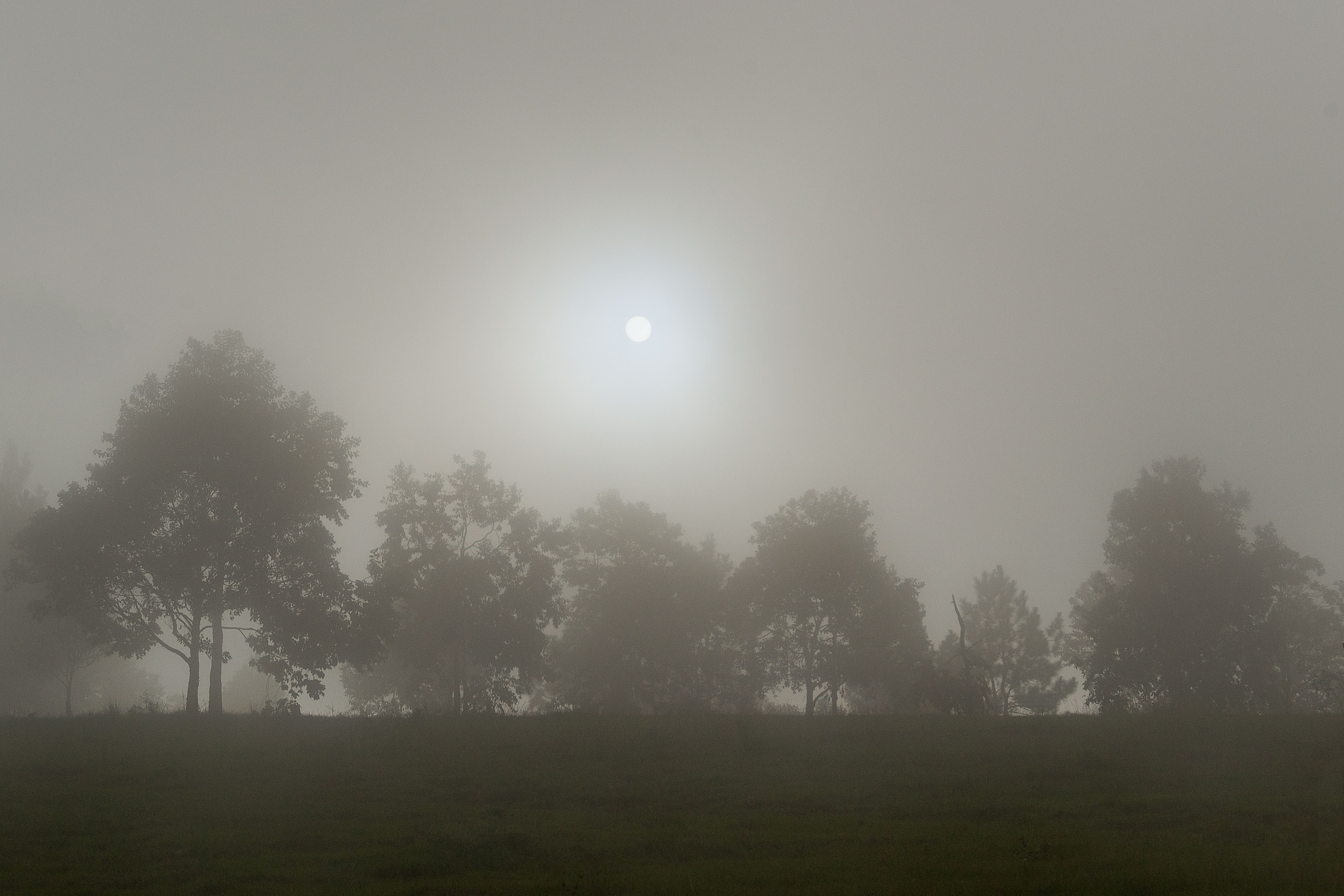
Fog obscures sunlight and vision on Obudu Plateau

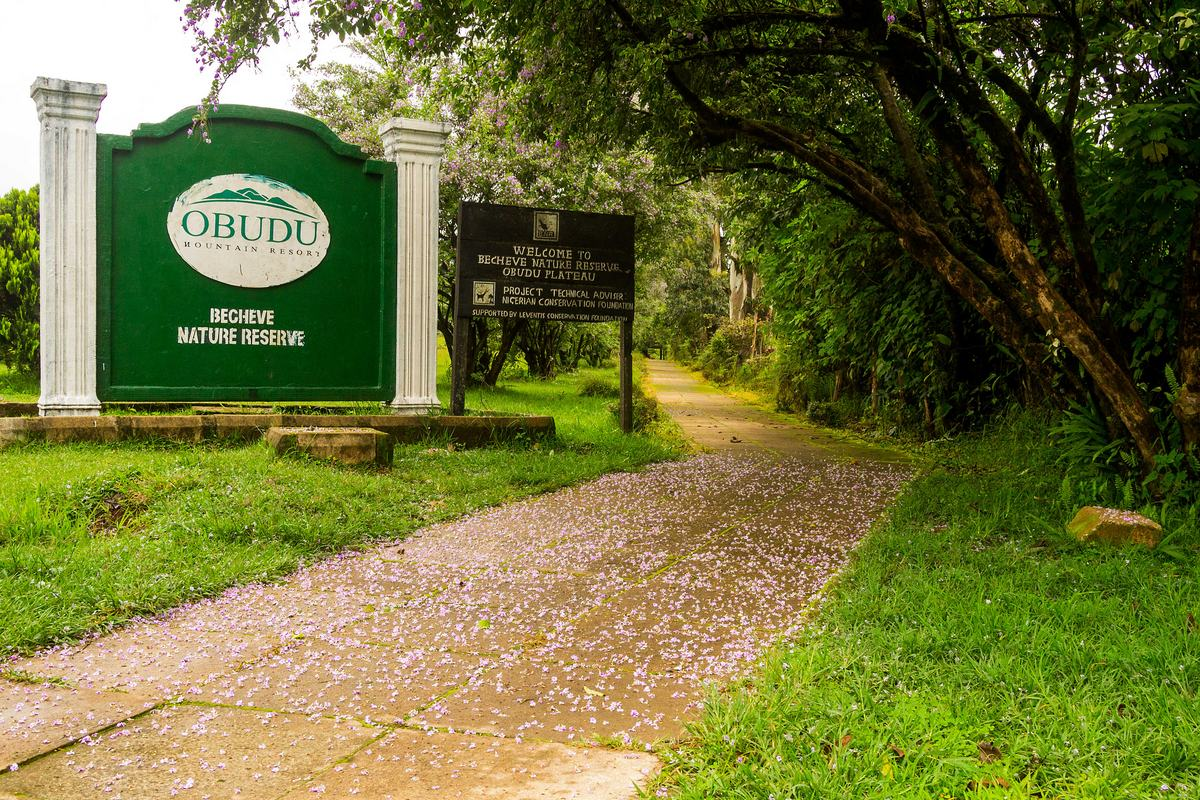
Entrance of the reserve

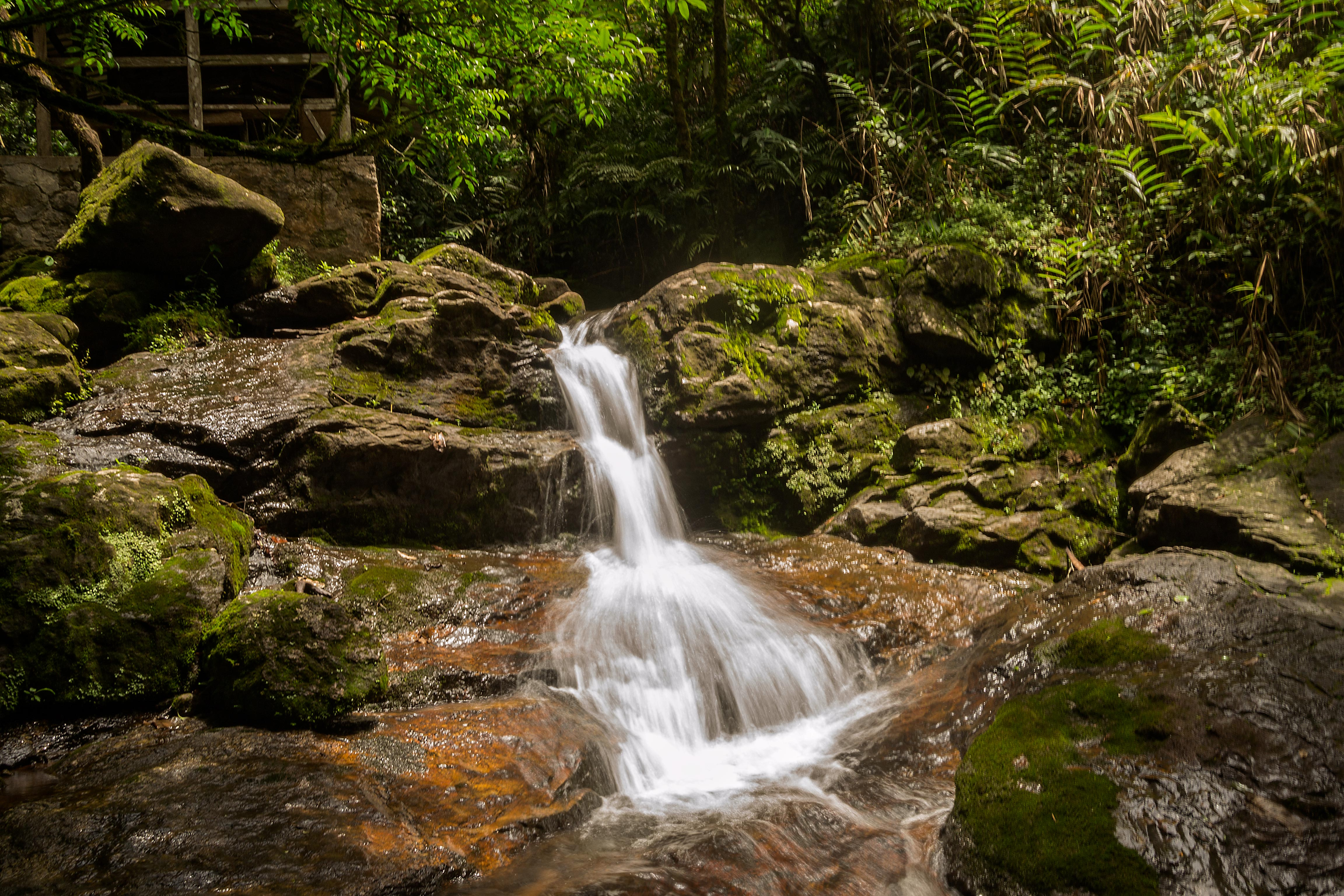
Mini waterfall at the grotto in Becheve Nature Reserve, a major attraction on Obudu Plateau

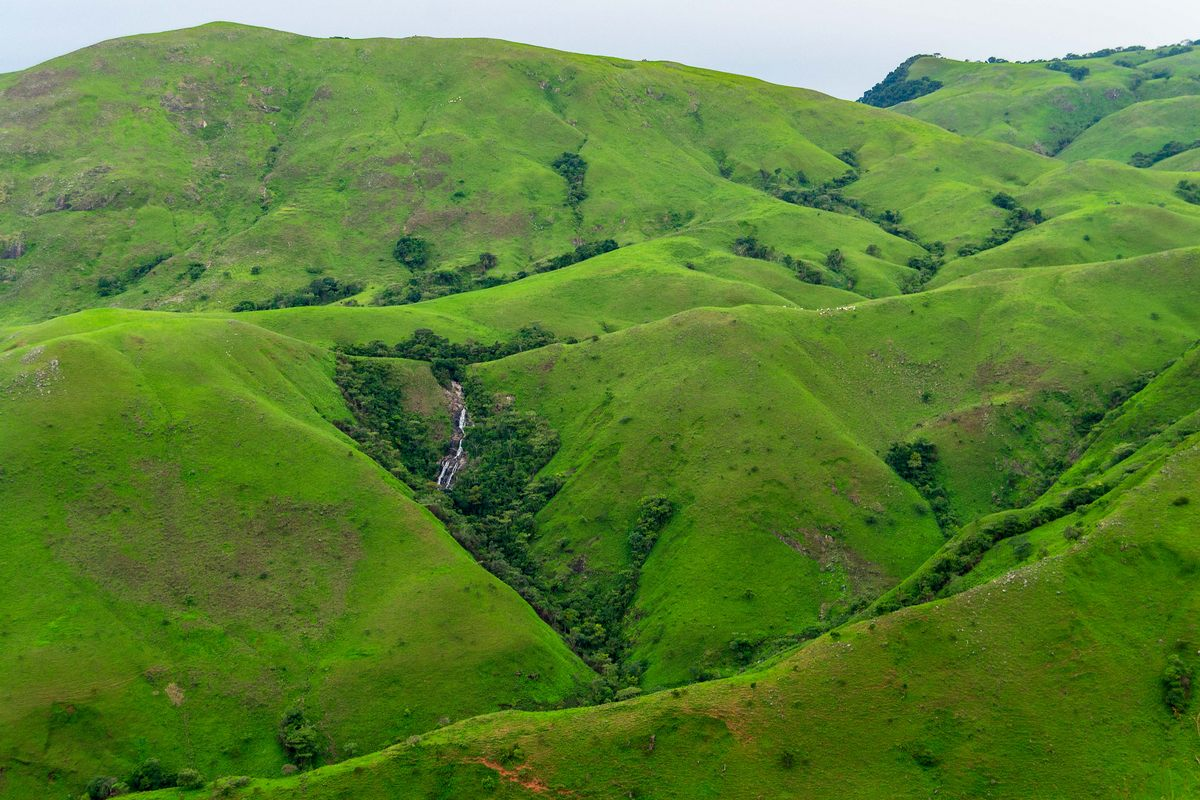
One of the several waterfalls on Obudu Plateau

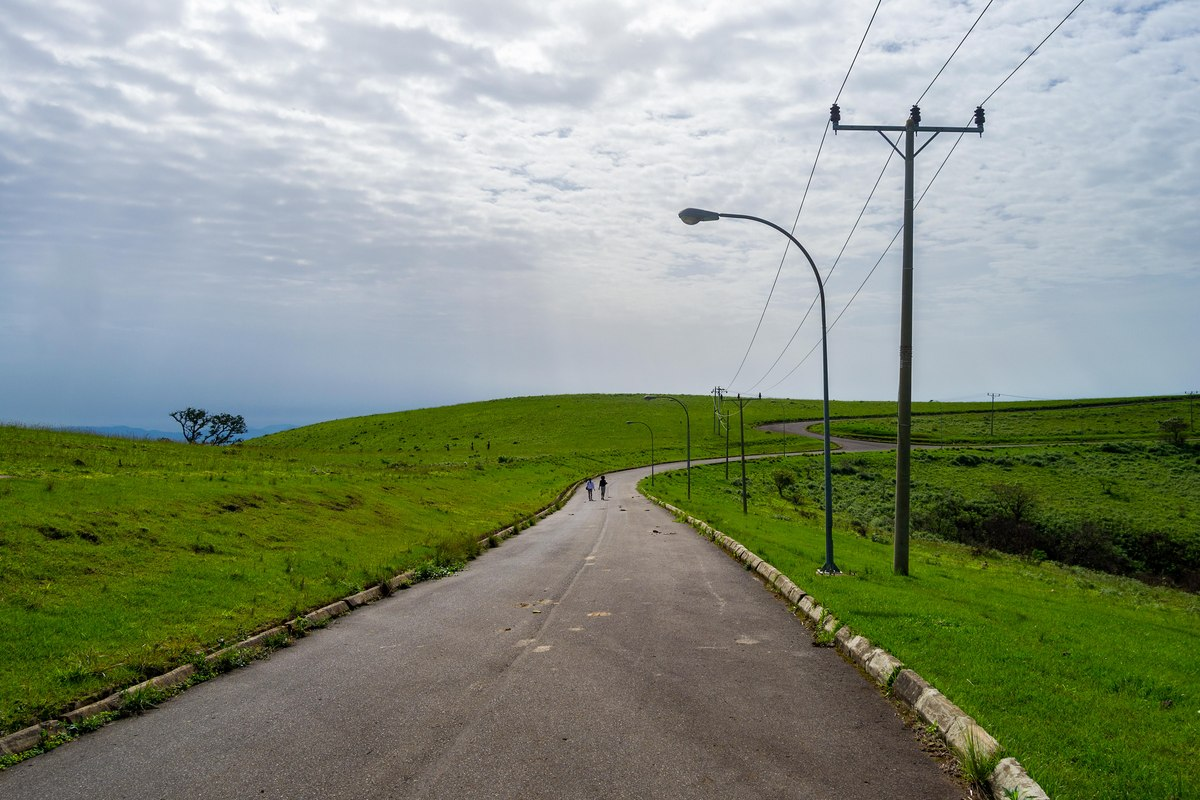
Roadway on Obudu Plateau

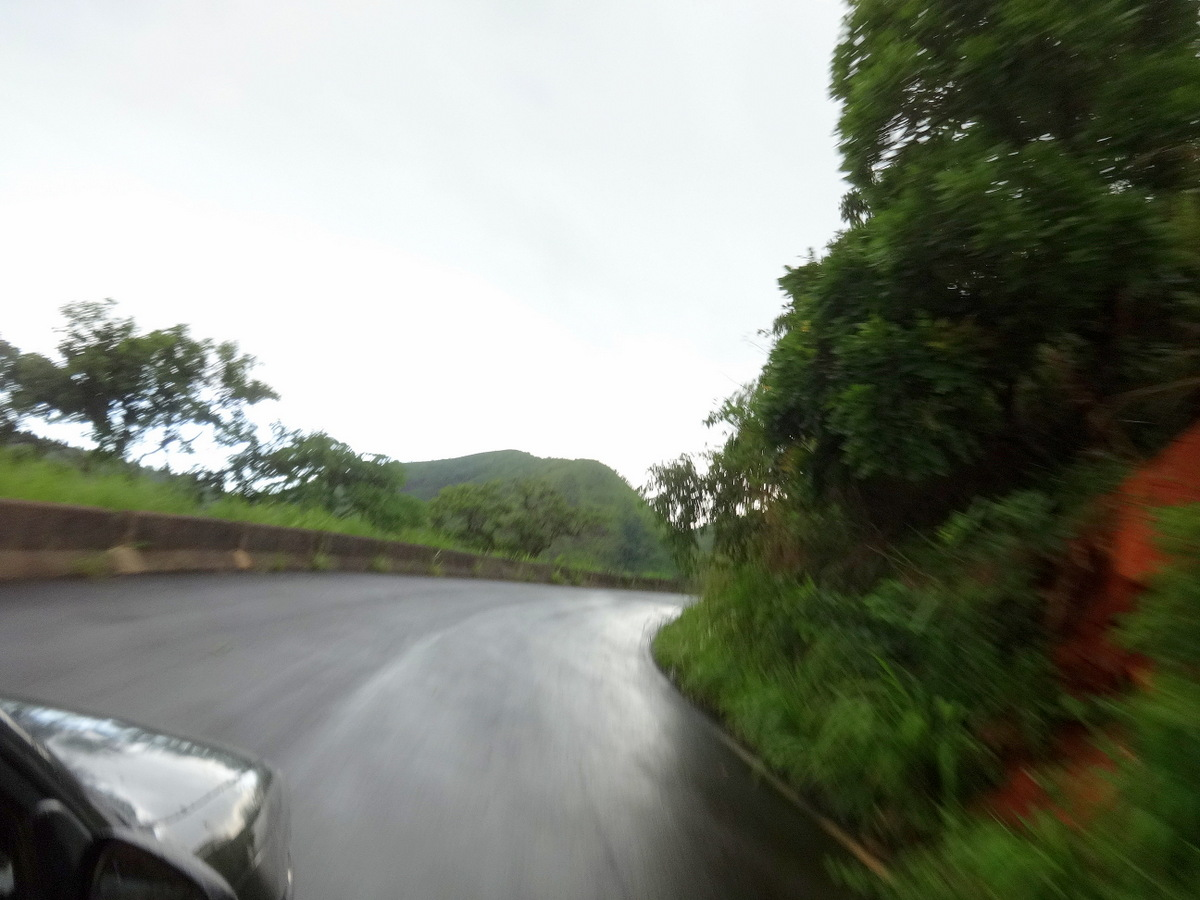
Winding road up Obudu Plateau

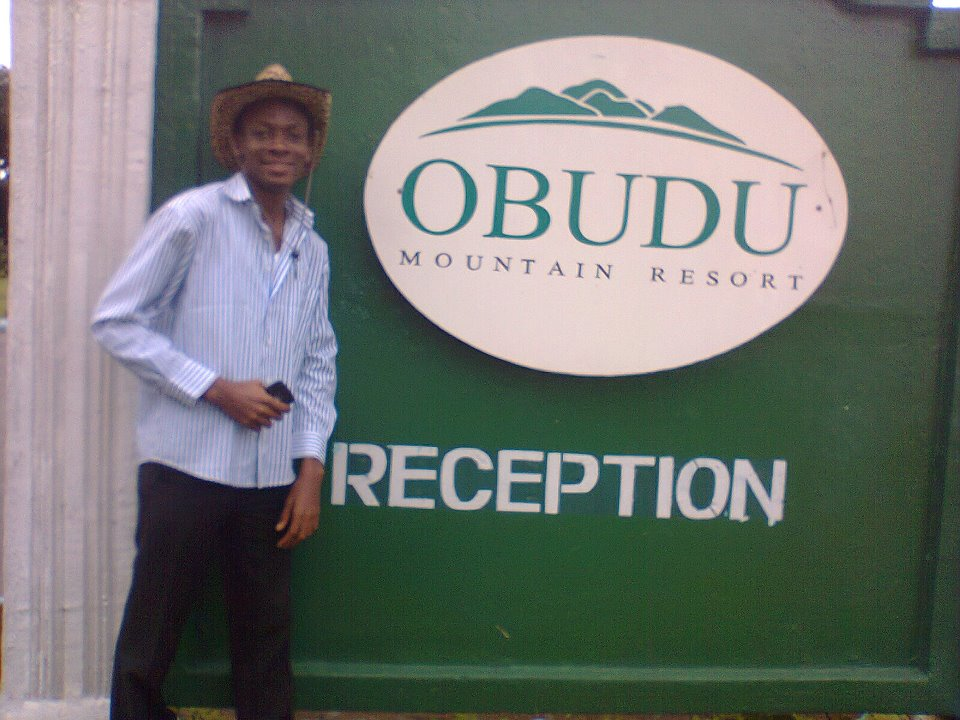
A man posing by the reception post of Obudu Mountain Resort

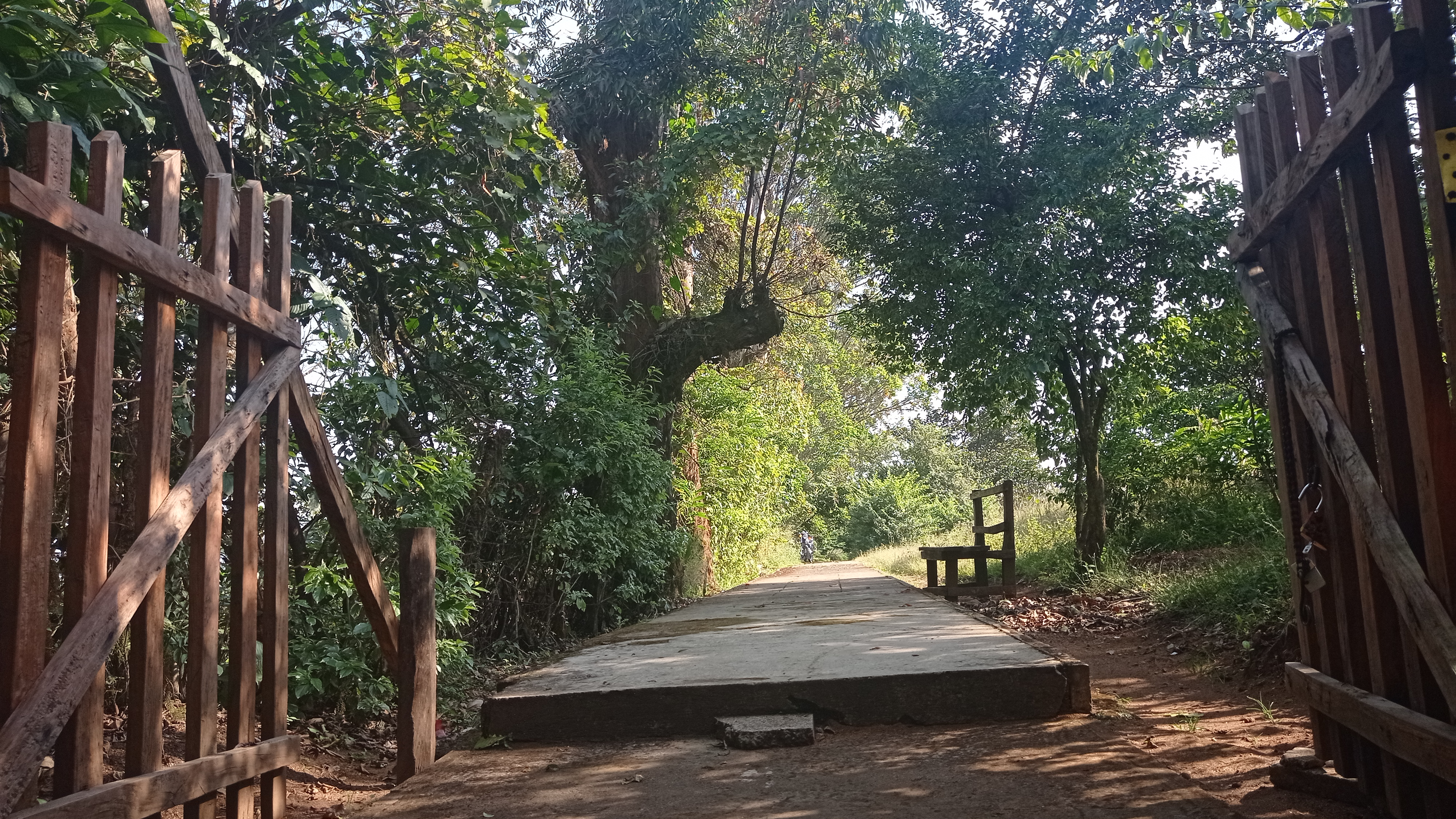
Becheve Nature Reserve

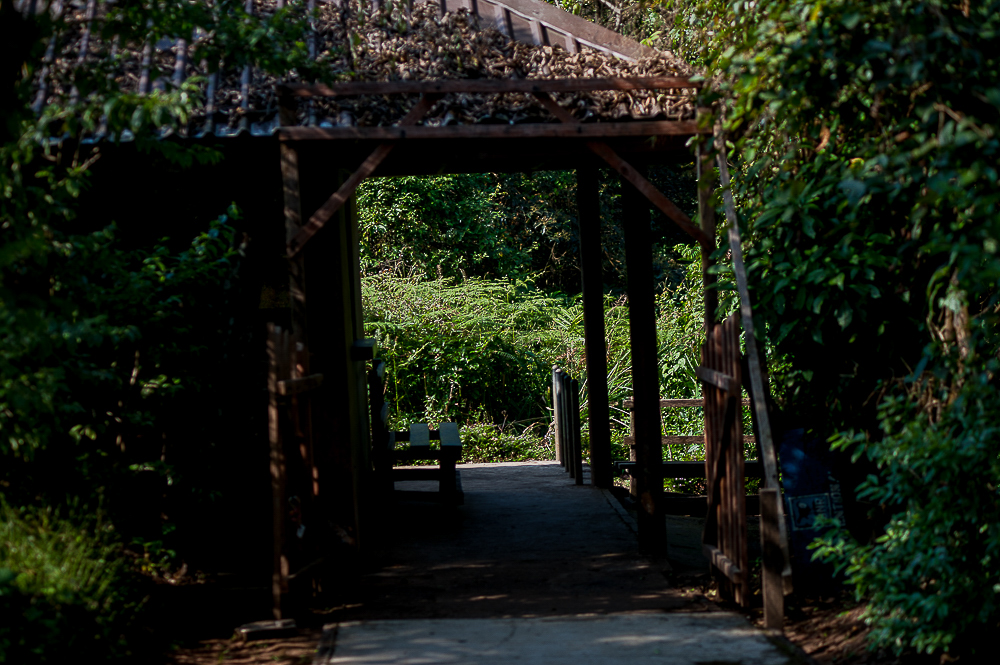
BNR tree nursery

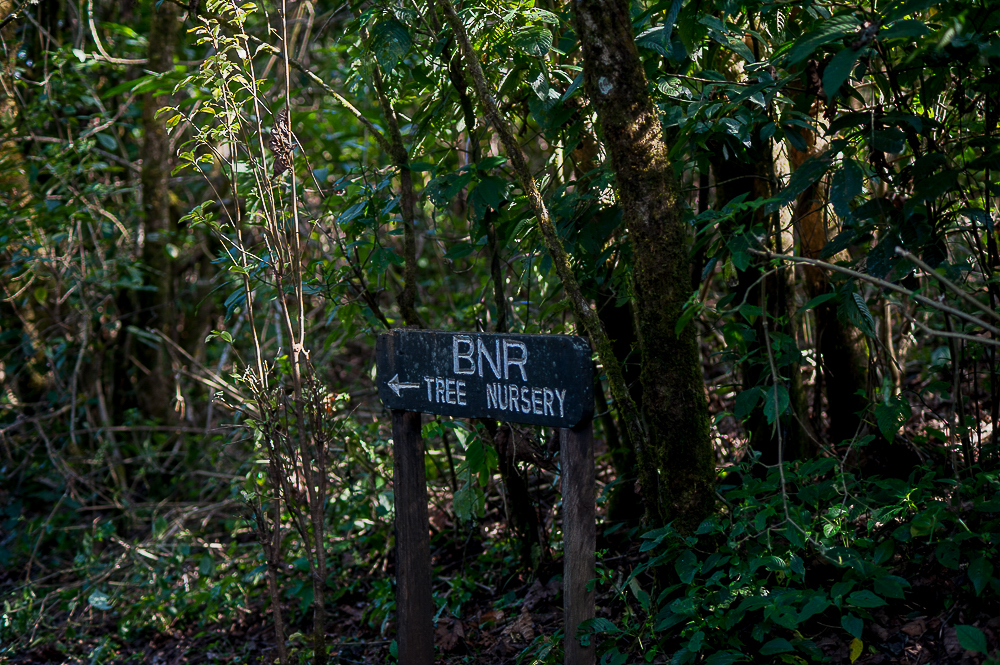
BNR tree nursery

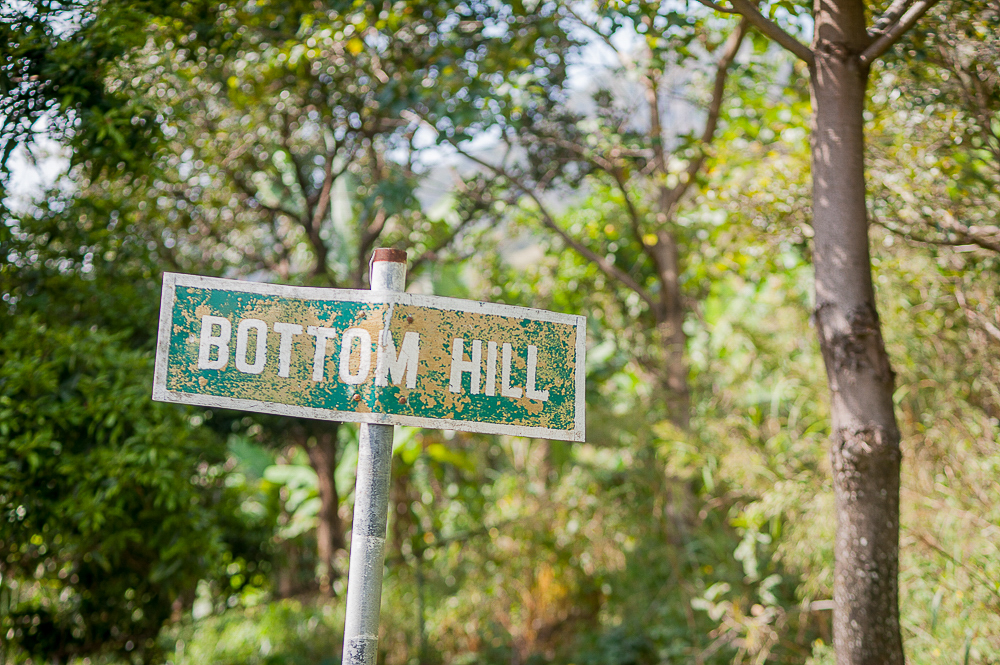
Bottom hill

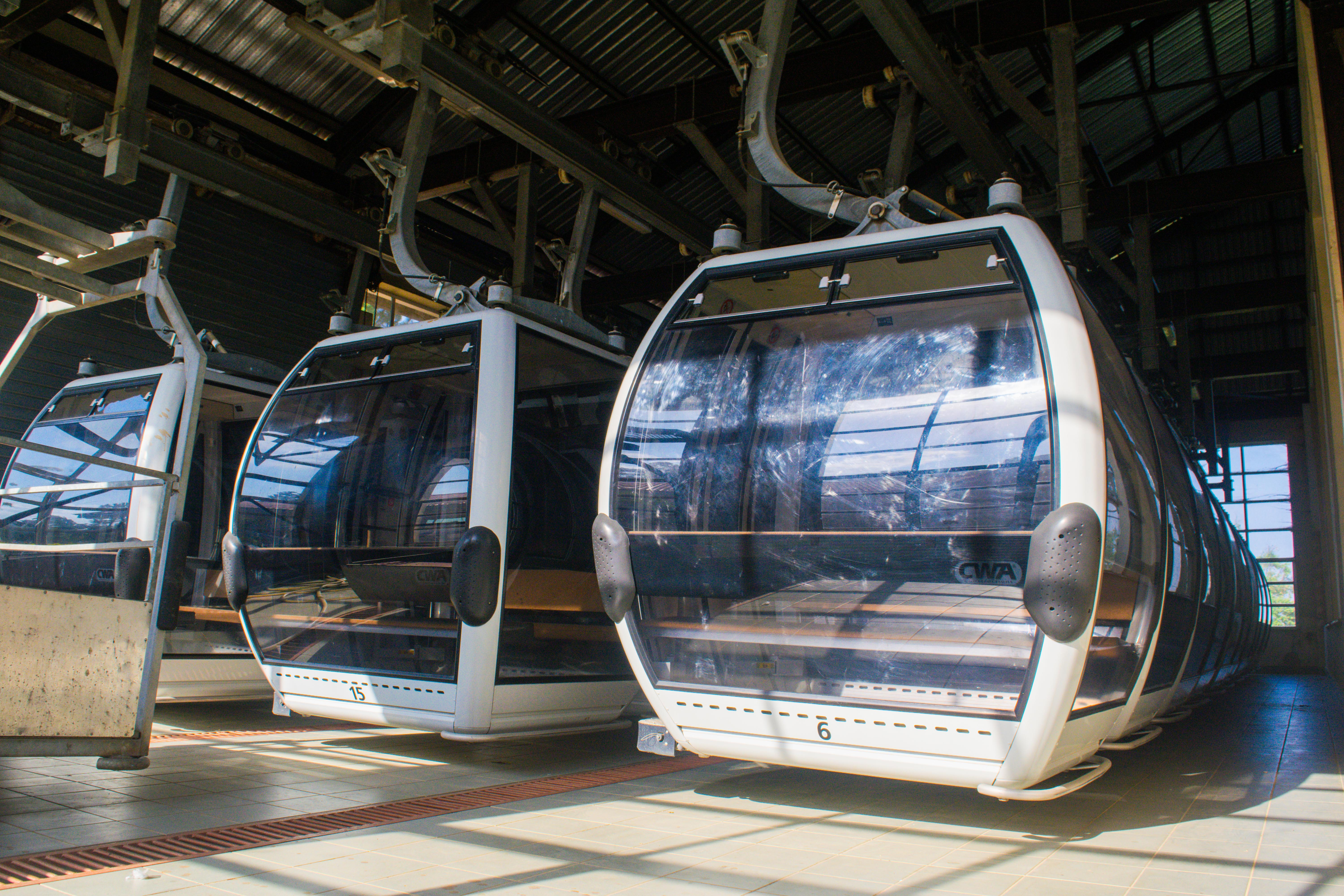
Cable cars

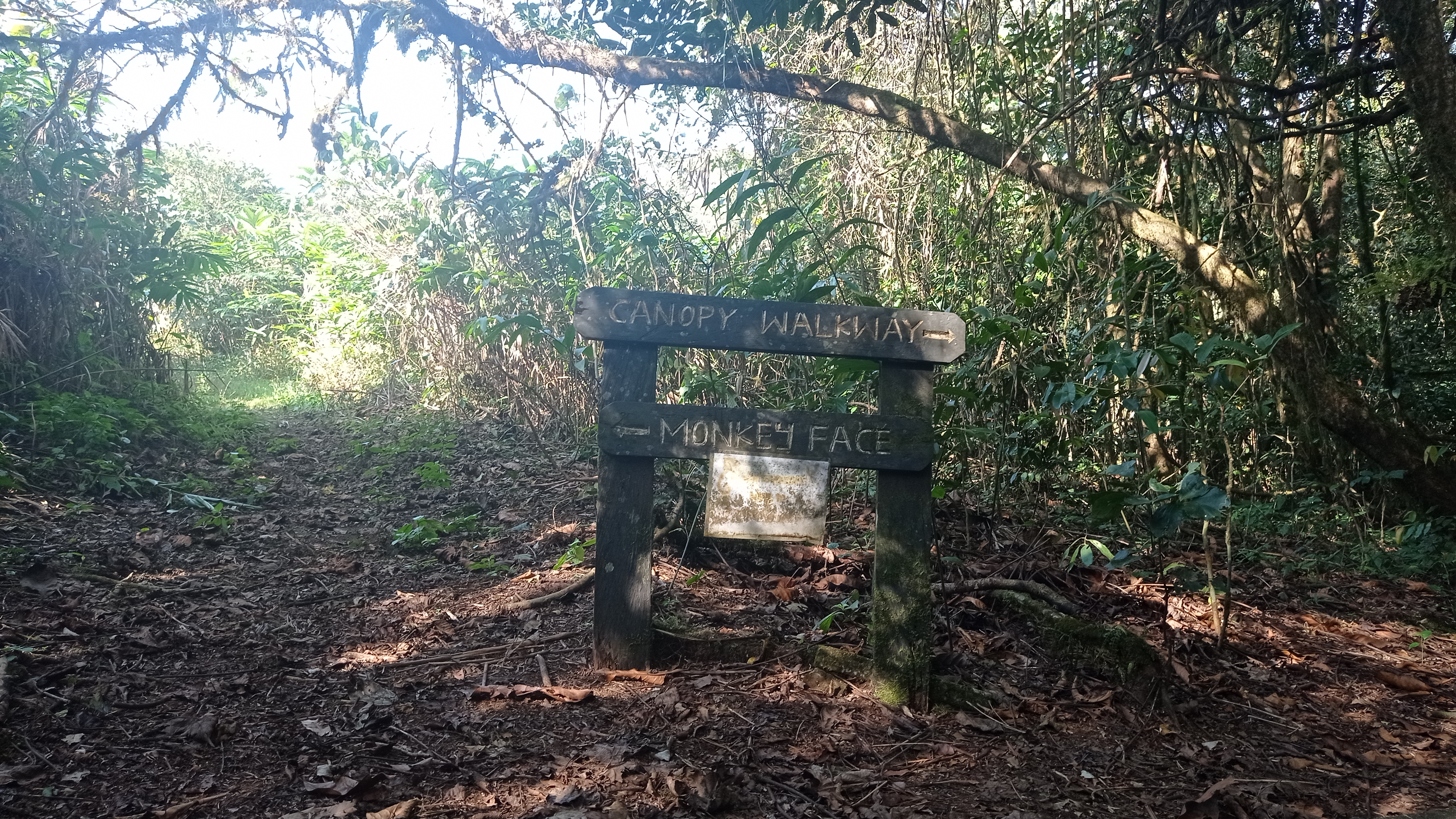
Canopy walk

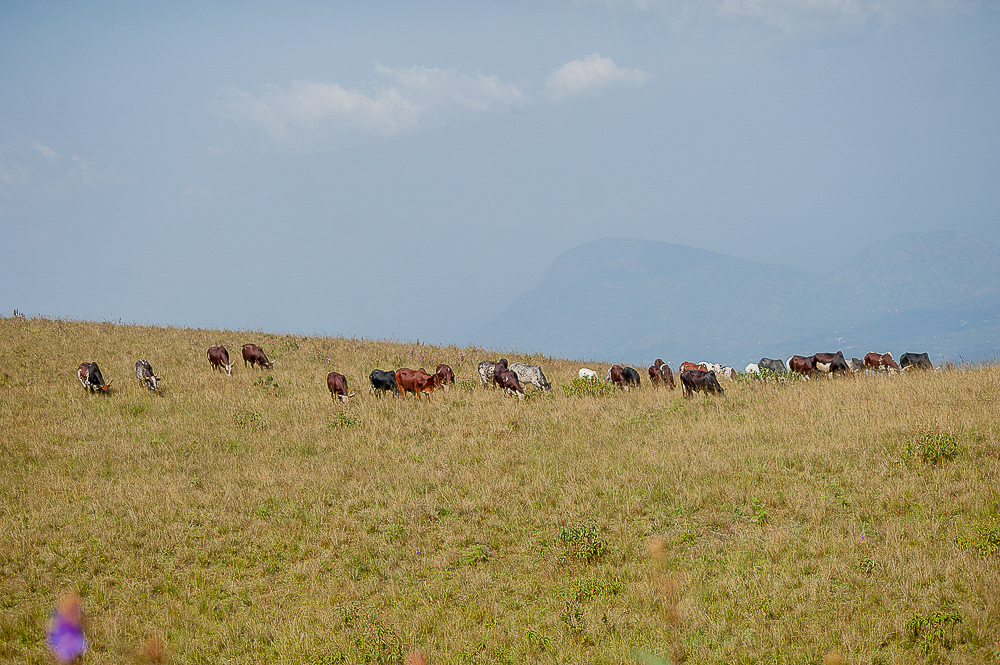
Grazing cattle

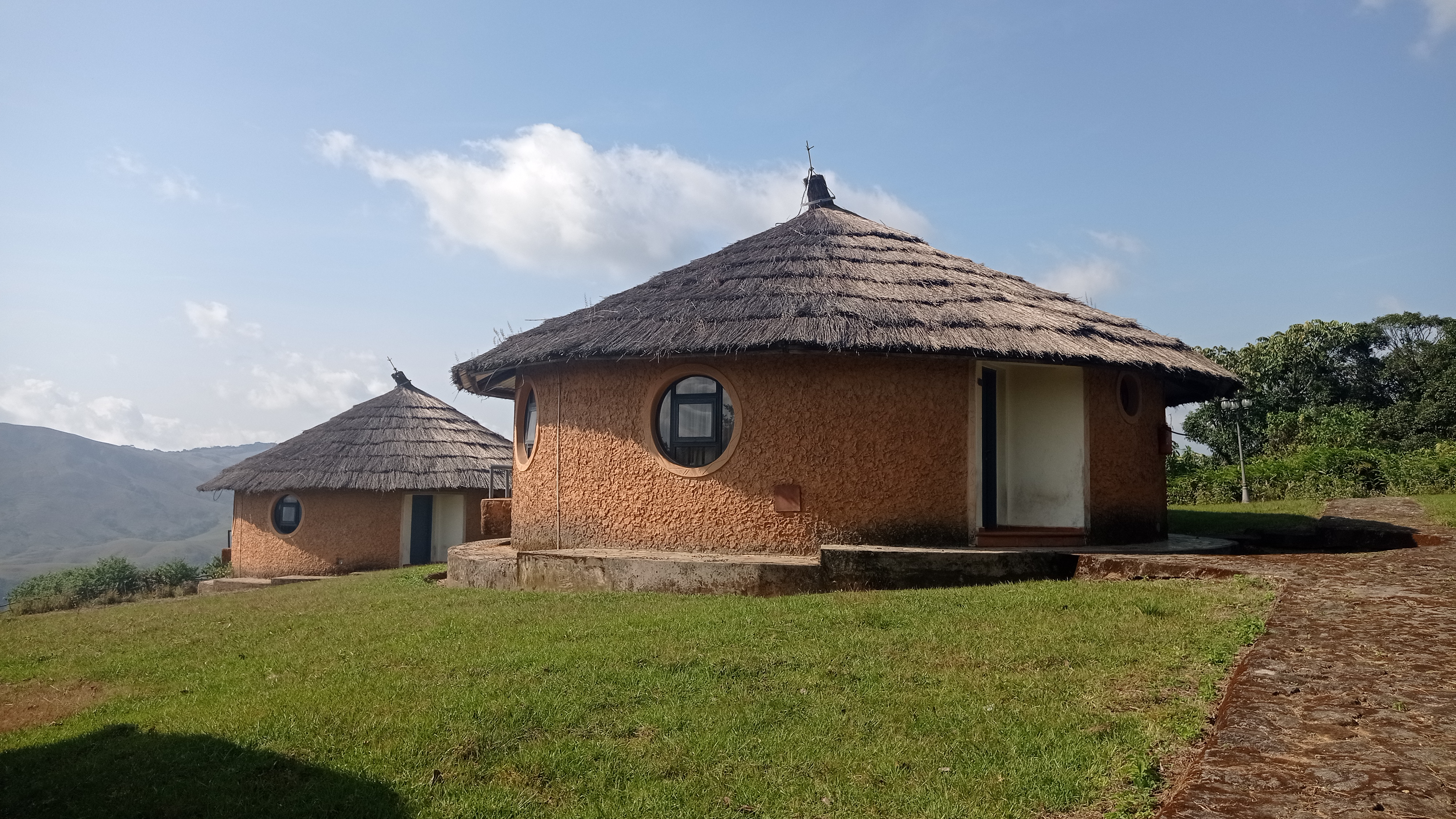
African Hut

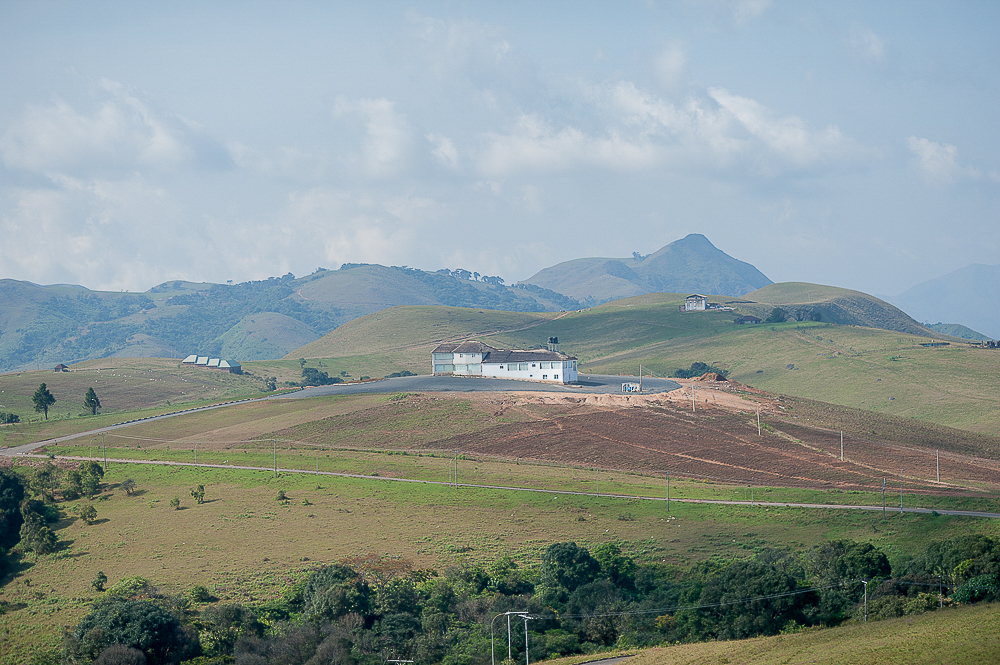
Governor's house

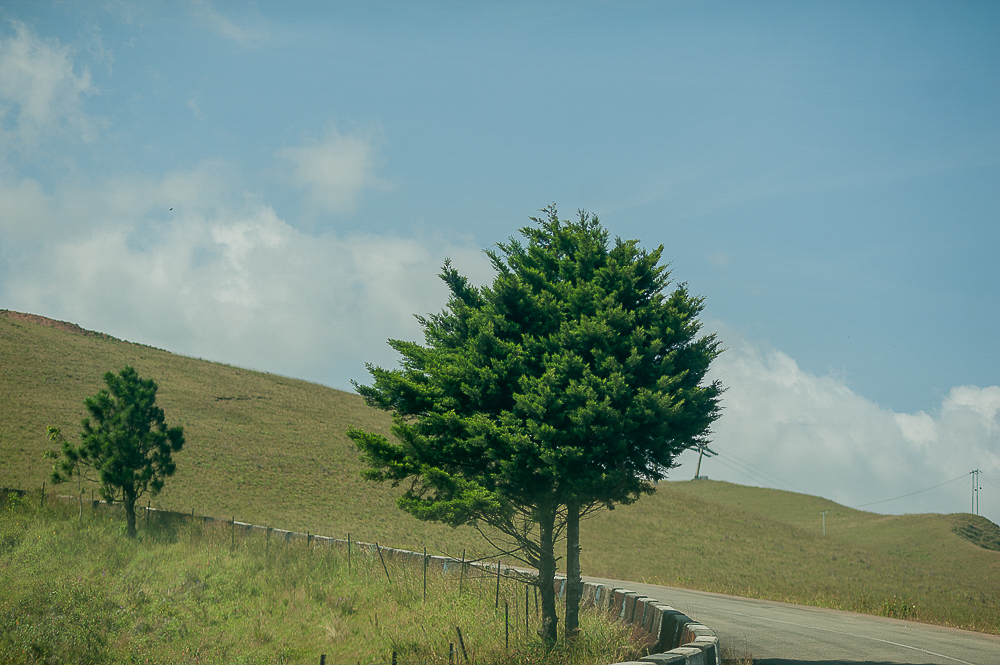
Vegetation

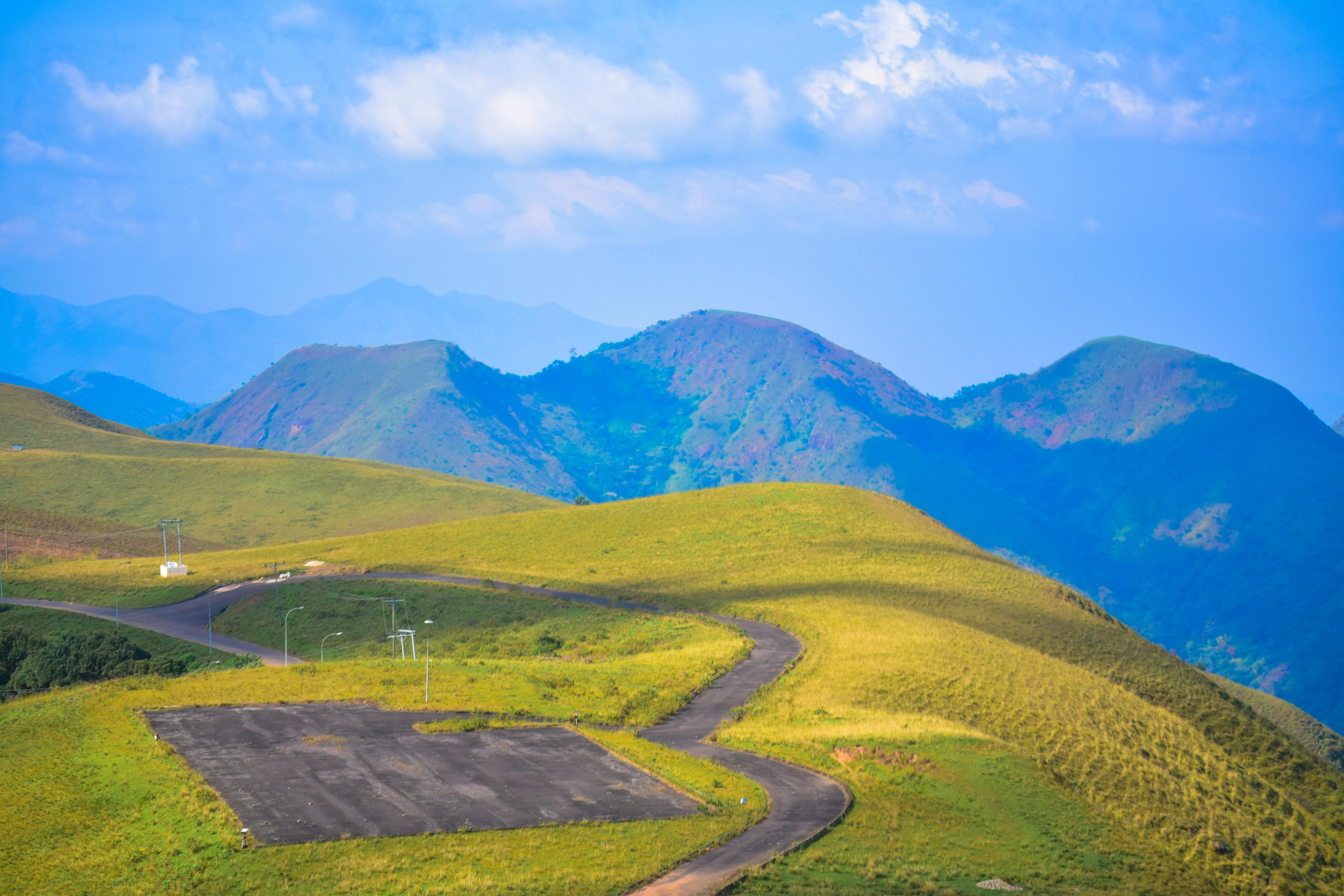
Helipad

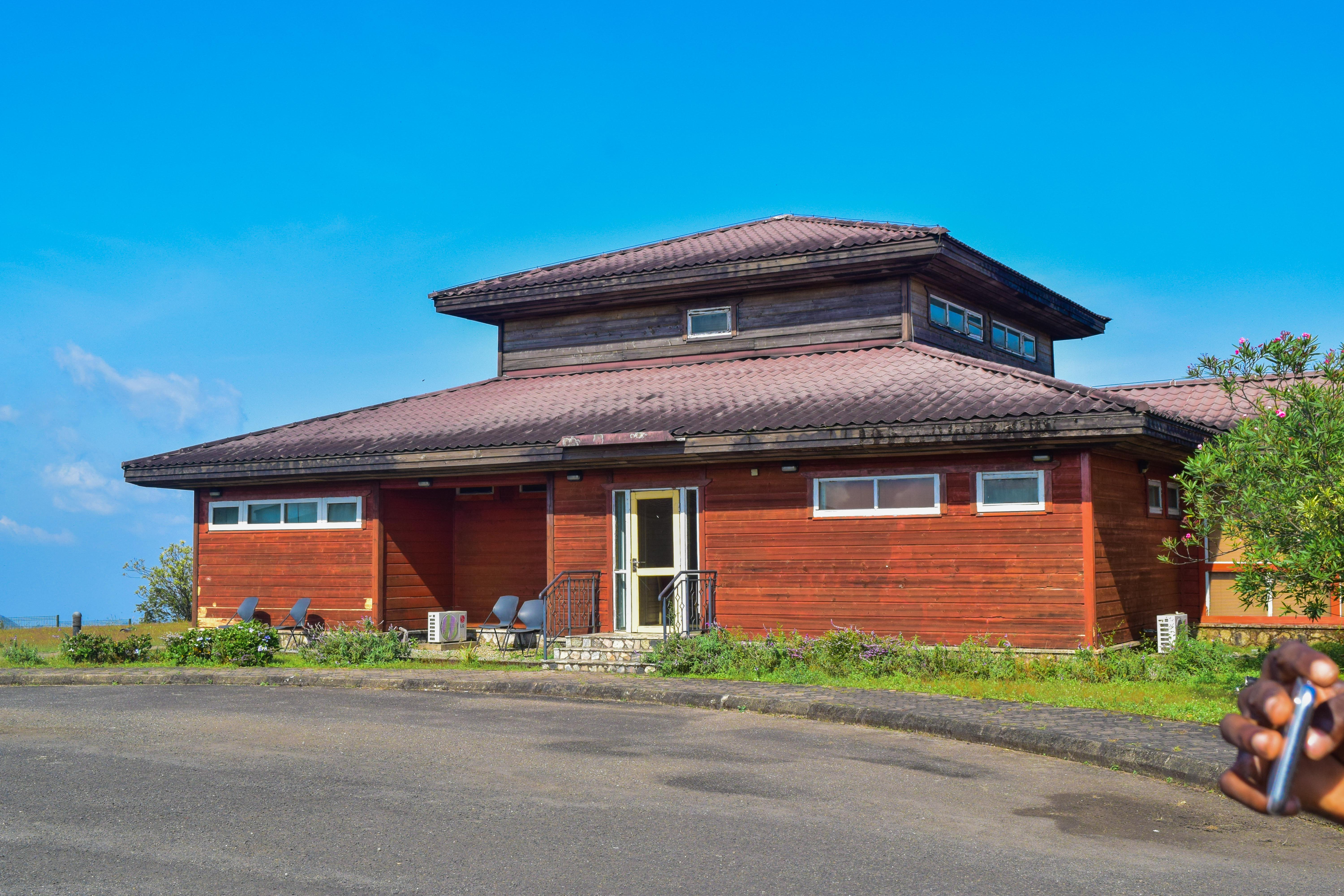
Hilltop Lodges

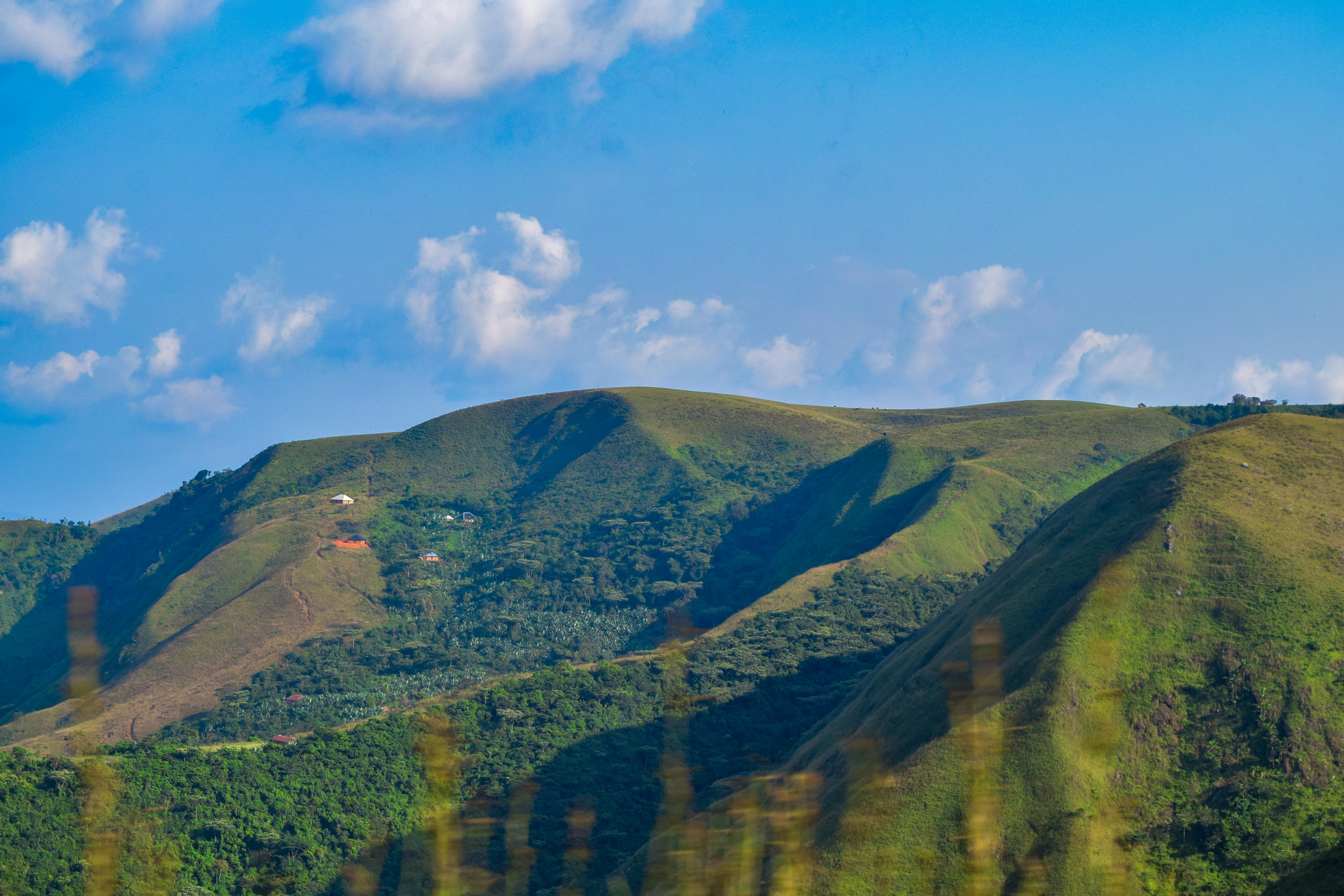
Holy Mountain view

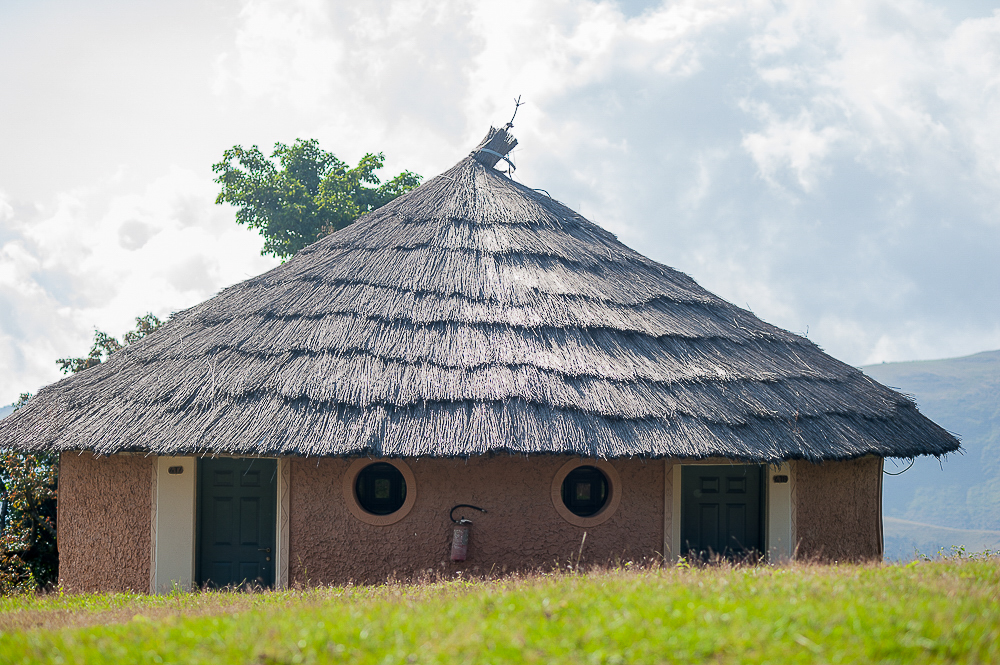
Hut House

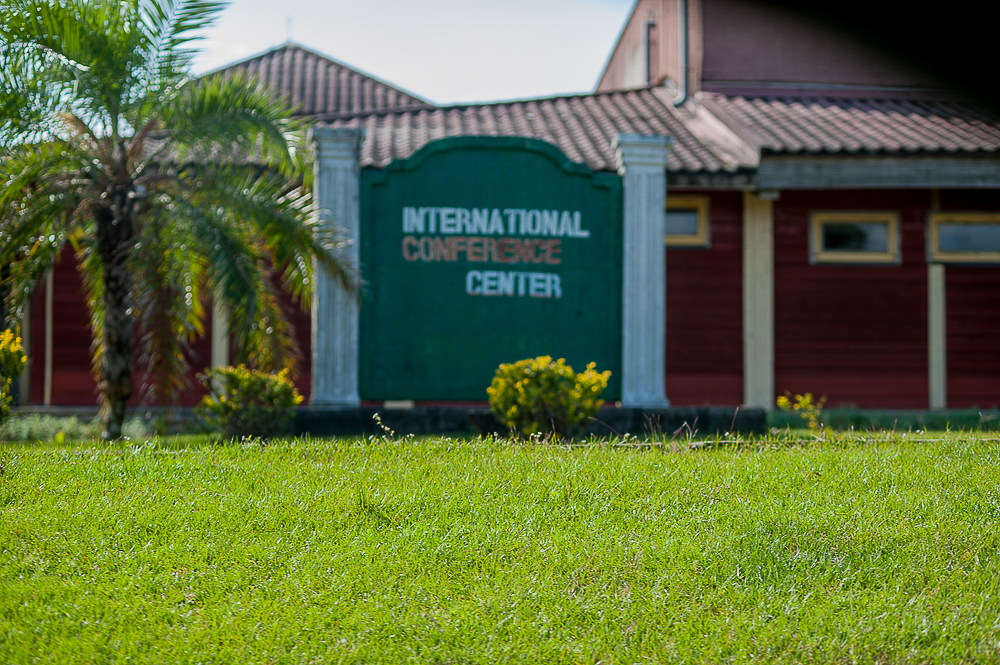
International Conference Centre

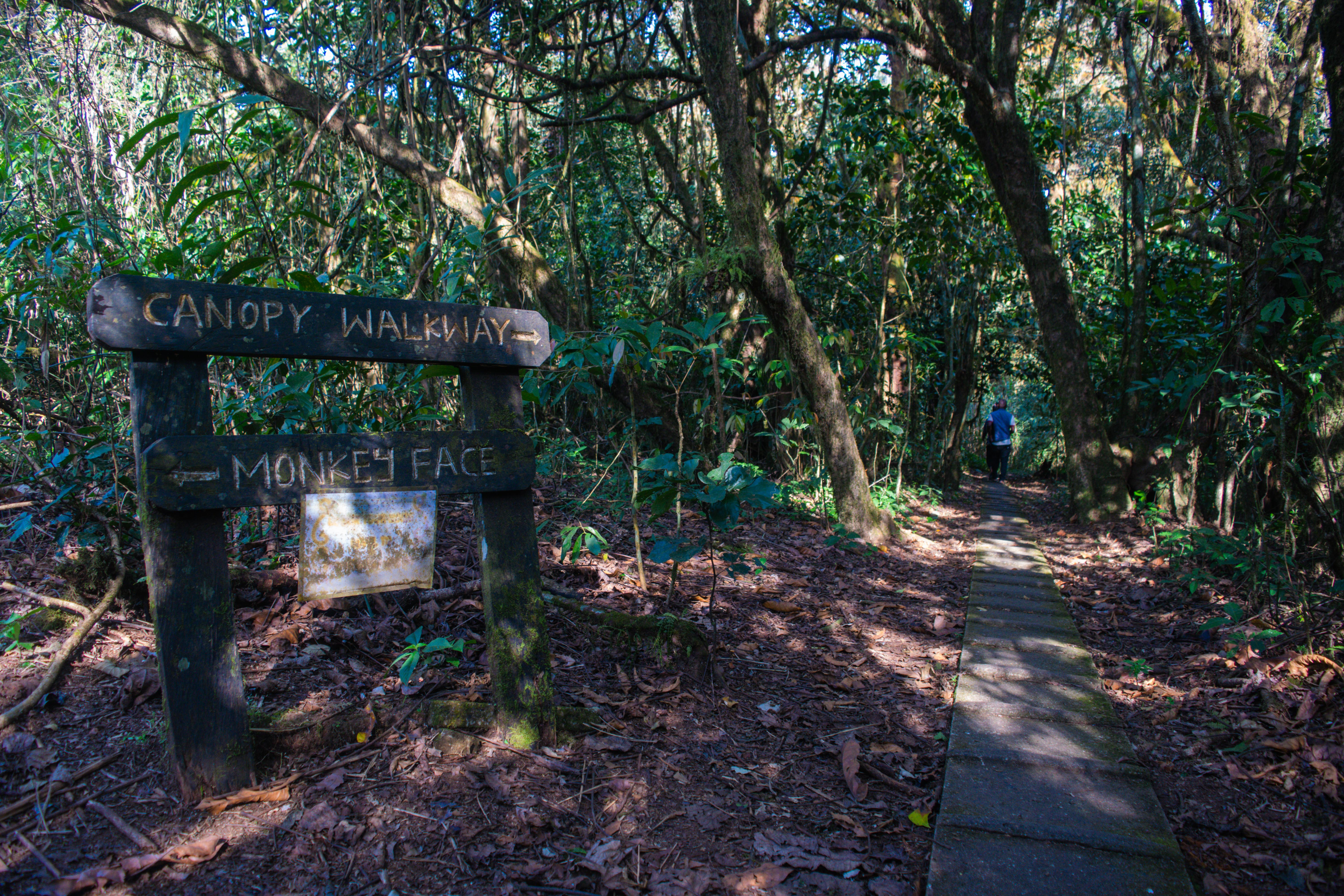
Nature Park

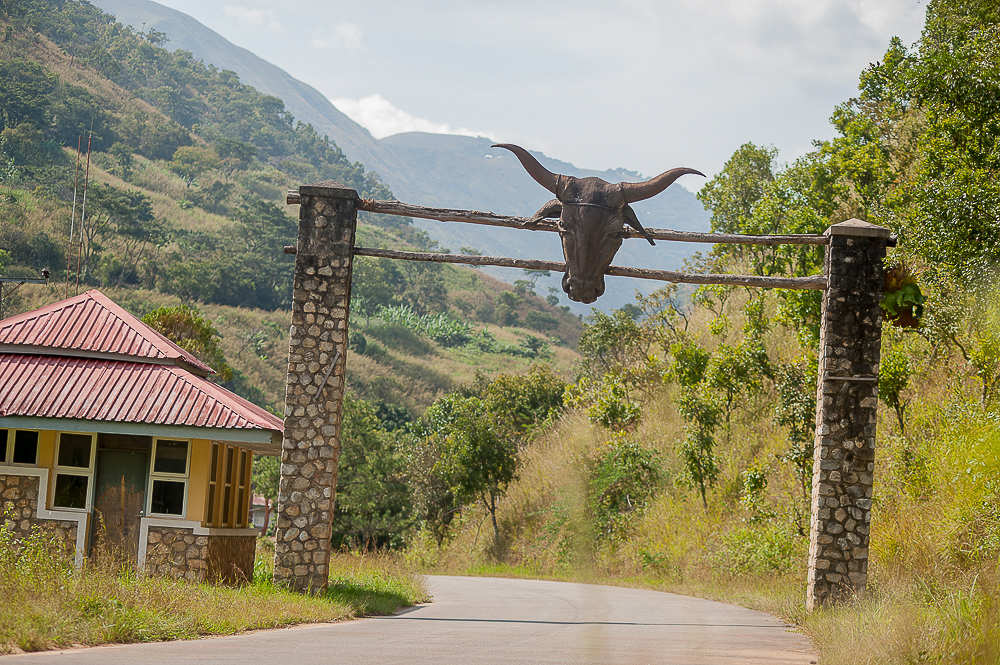
Ranch Gate

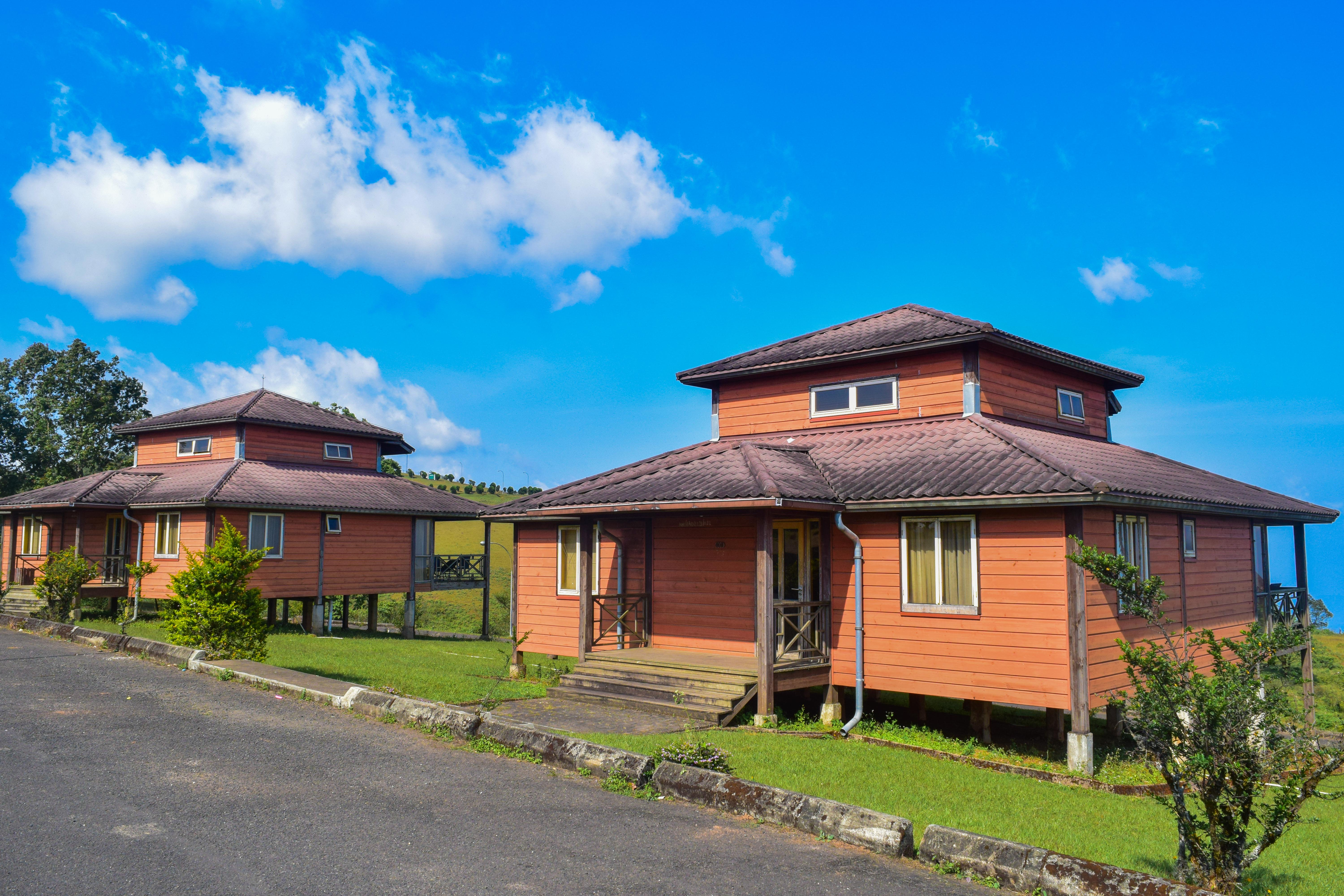
Obudu Cattle Ranch

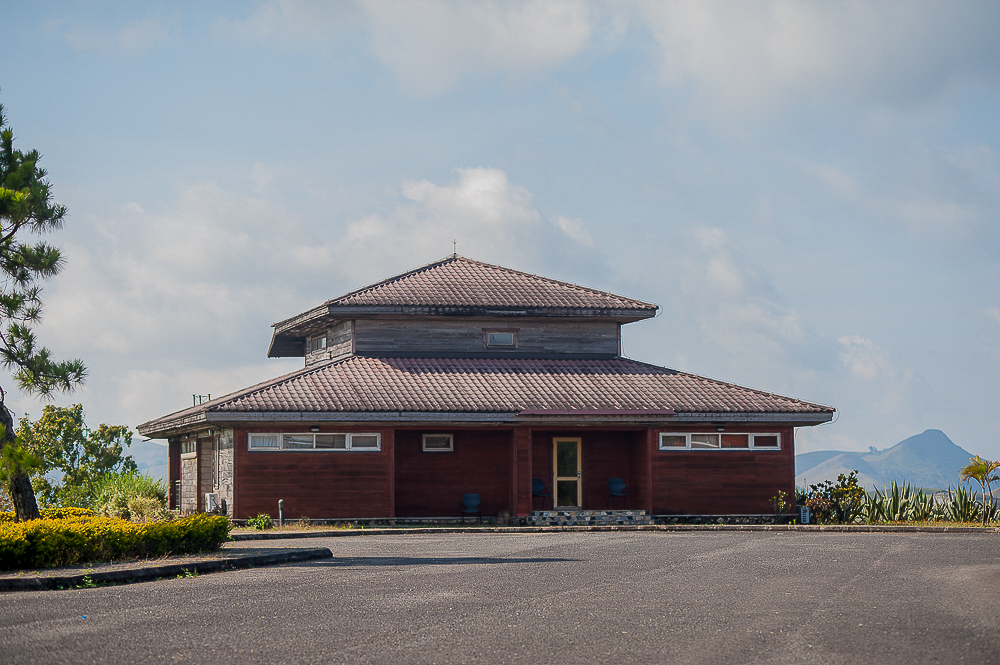
Presidential House

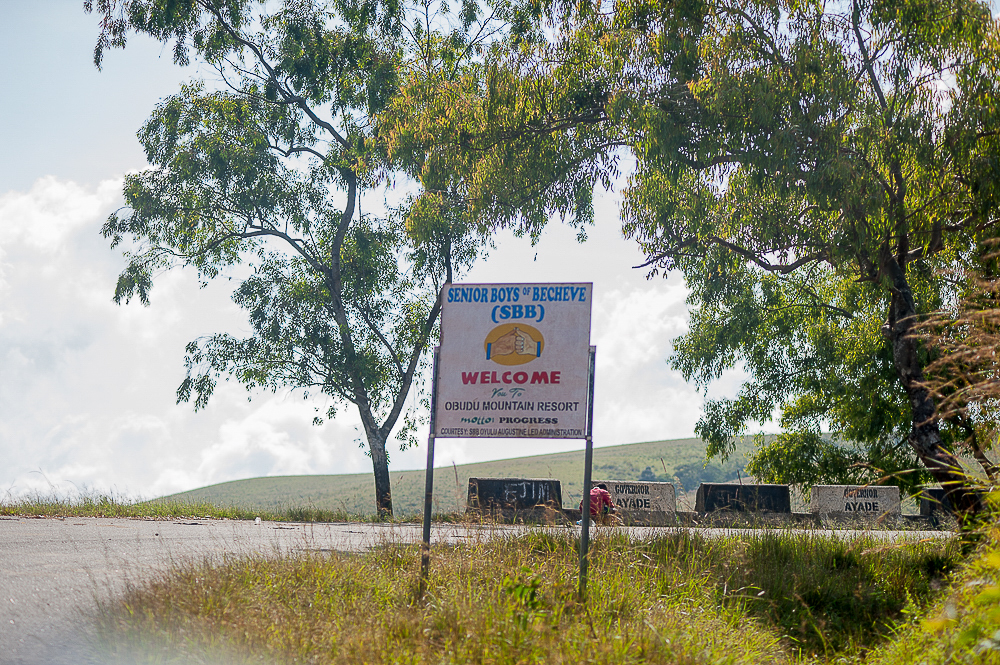
Becheve
