= John Randle Centre for Yoruba Culture and History =

Cultural Centre in Lagos

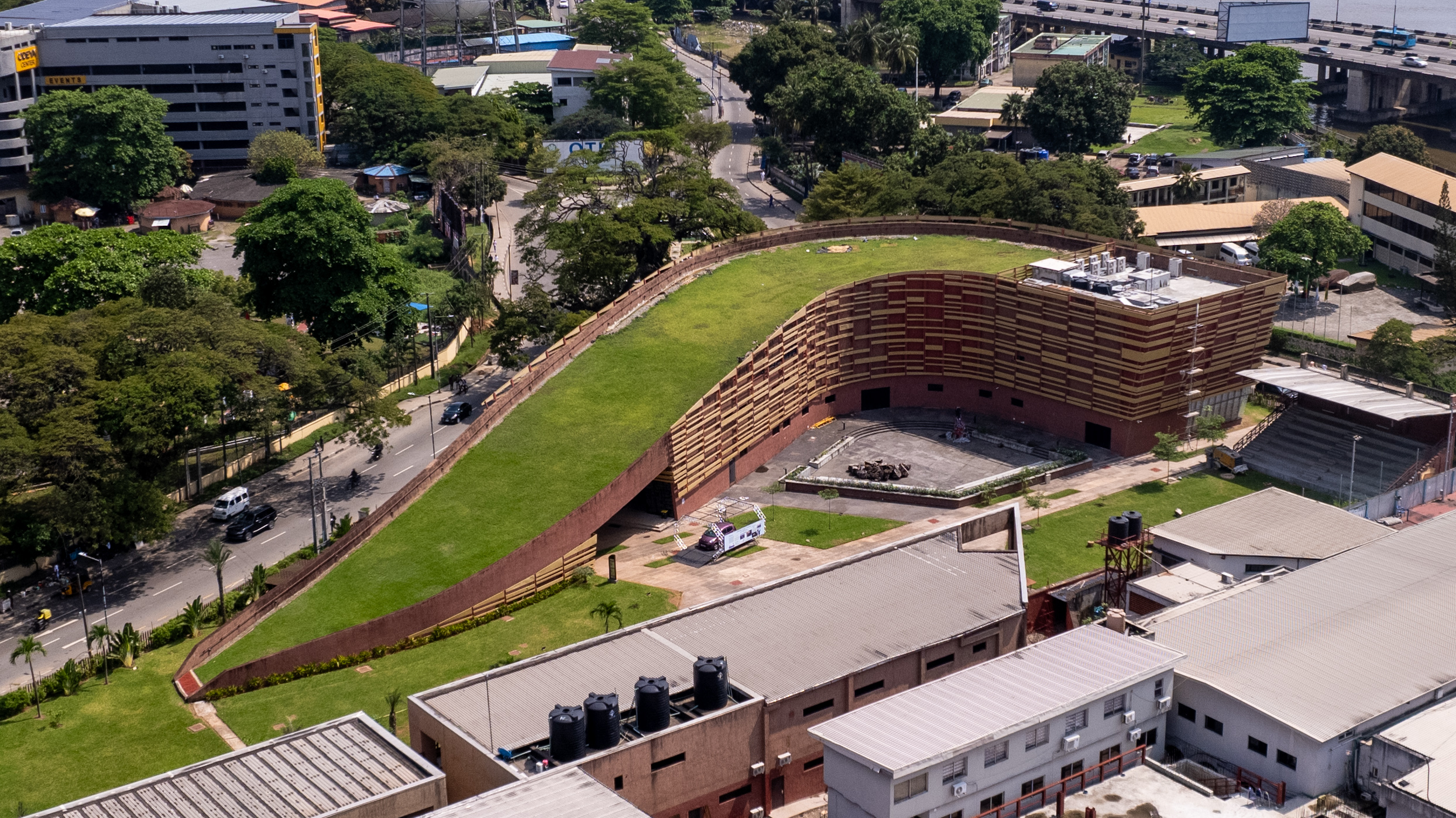
- Founded: 1928
- Founder: Lagos State Government
- Location: Onikan, Nigeria
- Coordinates: 6°26′35.77″N 3°24′9.93″E
- Product: cultural
- Director: Qudus Onikeku

The John Randle Centre for Yoruba Culture and History is a museum in Onikan (Lagos, Nigeria) that uses new technology to introduce visitors to Yoruba culture. It is situated in the immediate vicinity of the National Museum, the MUSON Conservatoire and Tafawa Balewa Square, where Nigeria’s independence was declared in 1960.

The centre is named after John K. Randle, one of the first doctors from West Africa, who also served as a Lagos city councillor during the colonial era. The museum’s new building was awarded a prize by the architecture magazine Dezeen.

== Construction and Renovation ==
The facility was built in 1928 as Nigeria’s first public swimming pool, under the name ‘JK Randle Memorial Hall and Swimming Pool’. In 2023, the Lagos State Government renovated the centre, which had fallen into disrepair over the decades. It was inaugurated in 2024 by the then President, Buhari.

== Design ==
The curved new building was designed by Seun Oduwole of the architectural studio SI.SA. The interior design and curatorial concept were developed by Ralph Appelbaum Associates of New York, a prestigious exhibition design firm that had previously designed the Holocaust Memorial Museum in Washington. Appelbaum focused on ‘immersive experiences’ and the interactive presentation of Yoruba culture. The aim is to break away from the static concept of traditional museums and appeal to both connoisseurs of Yoruba culture and ‘novices’.

== Exhibits ==
The J. K. Randle Centre for Yoruba Culture and History hosts exhibitions on the culture of Lagos and the Yoruba people. Among the items on display are early traditional costumes and designs of the Yoruba people. Items on loan for the exhibitions have been provided by renowned Nigerians such as Wole Soyinka, Lola Shoneyin and Ebenezer Obey, as well as the families of Obafemi Awolowo, Fela Kuti, Baba Sala and Daniel O. Fagunwa.

== Exhibitions and festivals ==
Designed as a centre for Yoruba culture and a tourist destination, it also serves as a venue for entertainment. In 2024, the first edition of the international festival for art, creativity and innovation, the ‘Afropolis Lagos Festival’, took place there. This was followed in 2025 by Àrìyá Village and the Janggu Festival (a joint cultural event between South Korea and Nigeria), and in 2026 by the Rush Festival. It features the early fashion attires and designs of the Yoruba people.

== Award ==
In 2025, the architecture magazine Dezeen included the Randle Centre on its longlist, describing it as follows:

“By blending traditional Yoruba narratives with cutting-edge exhibition design and technology, the John Randle Centre not only preserves and celebrates Yoruba culture but also engages visitors in a meaningful dialogue about its past, present and future.”
