= Obanliku =

- LGA
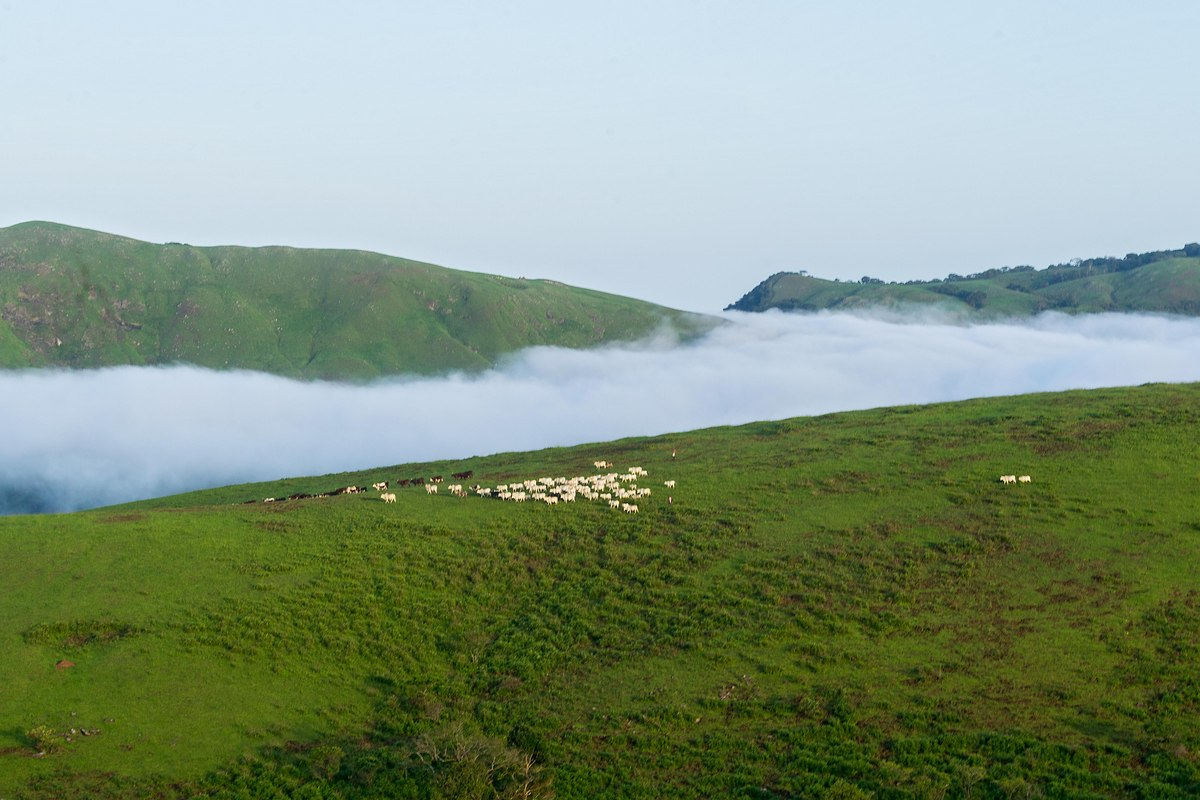
- Interactive map of Obanliku
- Country: Nigeria
- State: Cross River State
- Capital: Sankwala

Government
  - Local Government Chairman: Margaret Uyilewhome Indie

Area
  - Total: 1,057 km^{2} (408 sq mi)

Population (2006)
  - Total: 110,324
  - Density: 104.4/km^{2} (270.3/sq mi)
- Time zone: UTC+1 (WAT)
- Postal code: 552
- Website: www.crossriverhub.ng/obanliku

Obanliku is a Local Government Area of Cross River State, Nigeria. Its headquarter is in the town of Sankwala. Obanliku is made up of ten wards namely: Busi, Basang, Bebi, Bisu, Utanga, Becheve, Bendi 1, Bendi 2, Bishiri North & Bishiri South. Obanliku Local Government is located in the Northern Senatorial District of Cross River State. It is both an inter-State and international boundary Local Government Area. It is bounded in the North by Kwande Local Government of Benue State in the East by the Republic of Cameroon, the west by Obudu Local Government Area and in the South by Boki Local Government Area.

It has an area of 1,057 km^{2} and a population of 110,324 at the 2006 census.

The postal code of the area is 552.

The Executive Chairman of Obanliku Local Government Council, is Evangelist Margaret U. Inde.

The Obudu Cattle Ranch is within the area of Obanliku. An annual international race is held at the destination – the Obudu Ranch International Mountain Race. The people that inhabit the Obanliku Local Government Area are predominantly farmers. Agriculture which accounts for about 80 percent of production is the mainstay of the economy of the Local Government Area. The area has abundant fertile land which is suitable for the cultivation of the following cash crops: Apple, Banana, Cashew, Cassava, Castor, Citrus Orchard, Cocoa, Coffee, Cotton, Grape, Groundnut, Honey breeding, Kola nut, Mango, Palm Tree, Pineapple, Plantation, Rice, Soya beams, Tea, Wheat and Yams.

== Geography ==
With a total size of 1,057 km^{2} (408 sq mi), Obanliku LGA is home to numerous rivers and streams. The LGA is home to several hills and mountains and has an average temperature of 24 degrees Celsius / 75 degrees Fahrenheit. Obanliku LGA is estimated to have an average humidity of 80%.
