= South South =

South-South
- Geopolitical zone
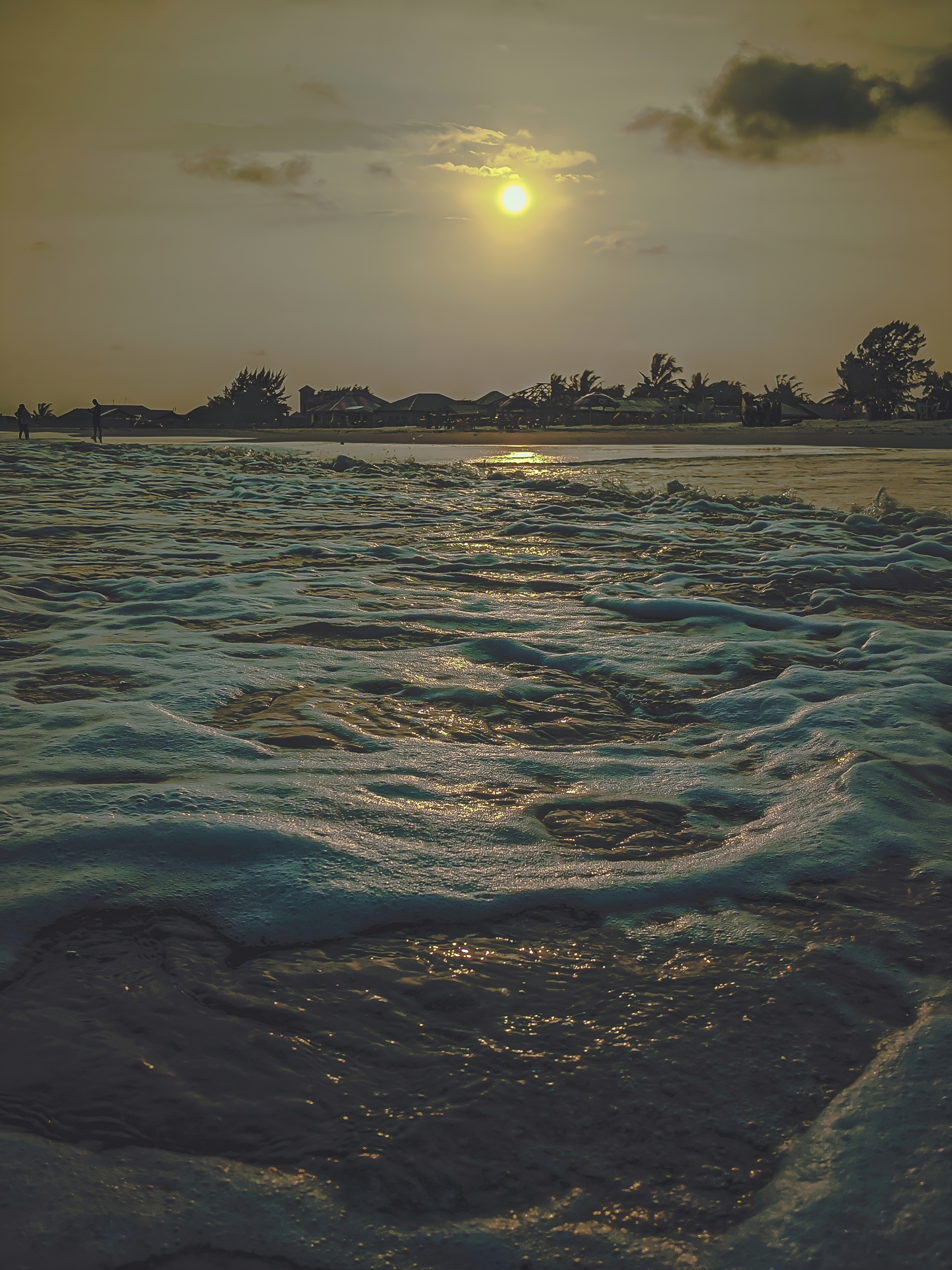
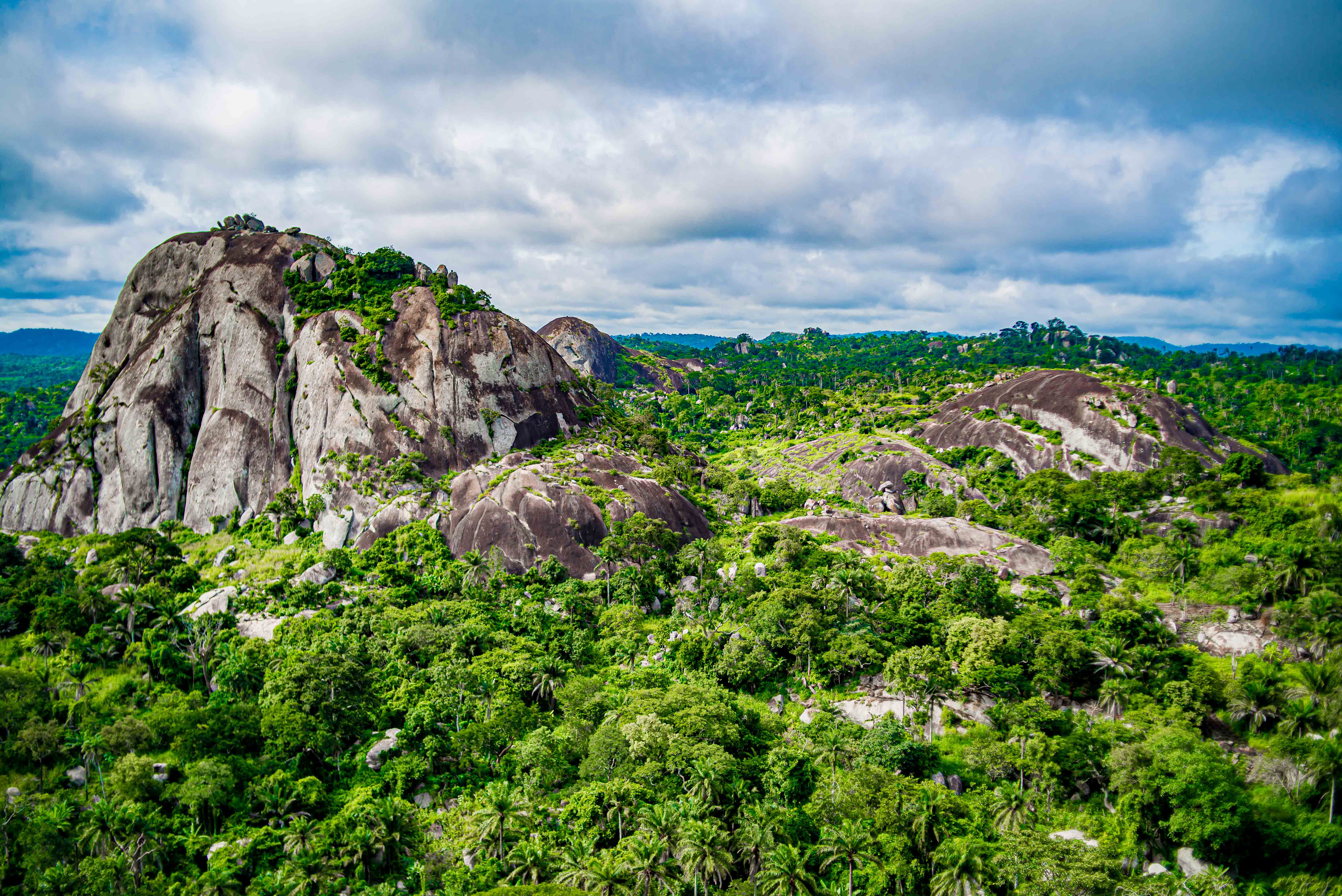
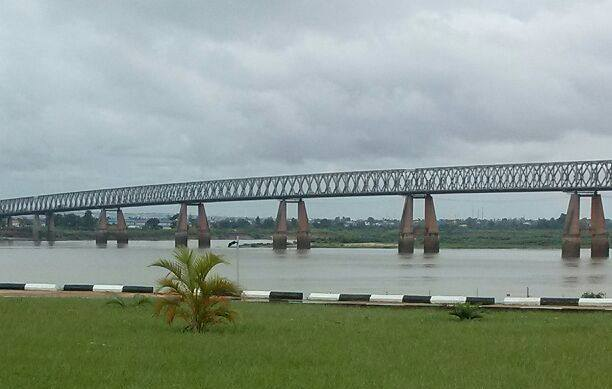
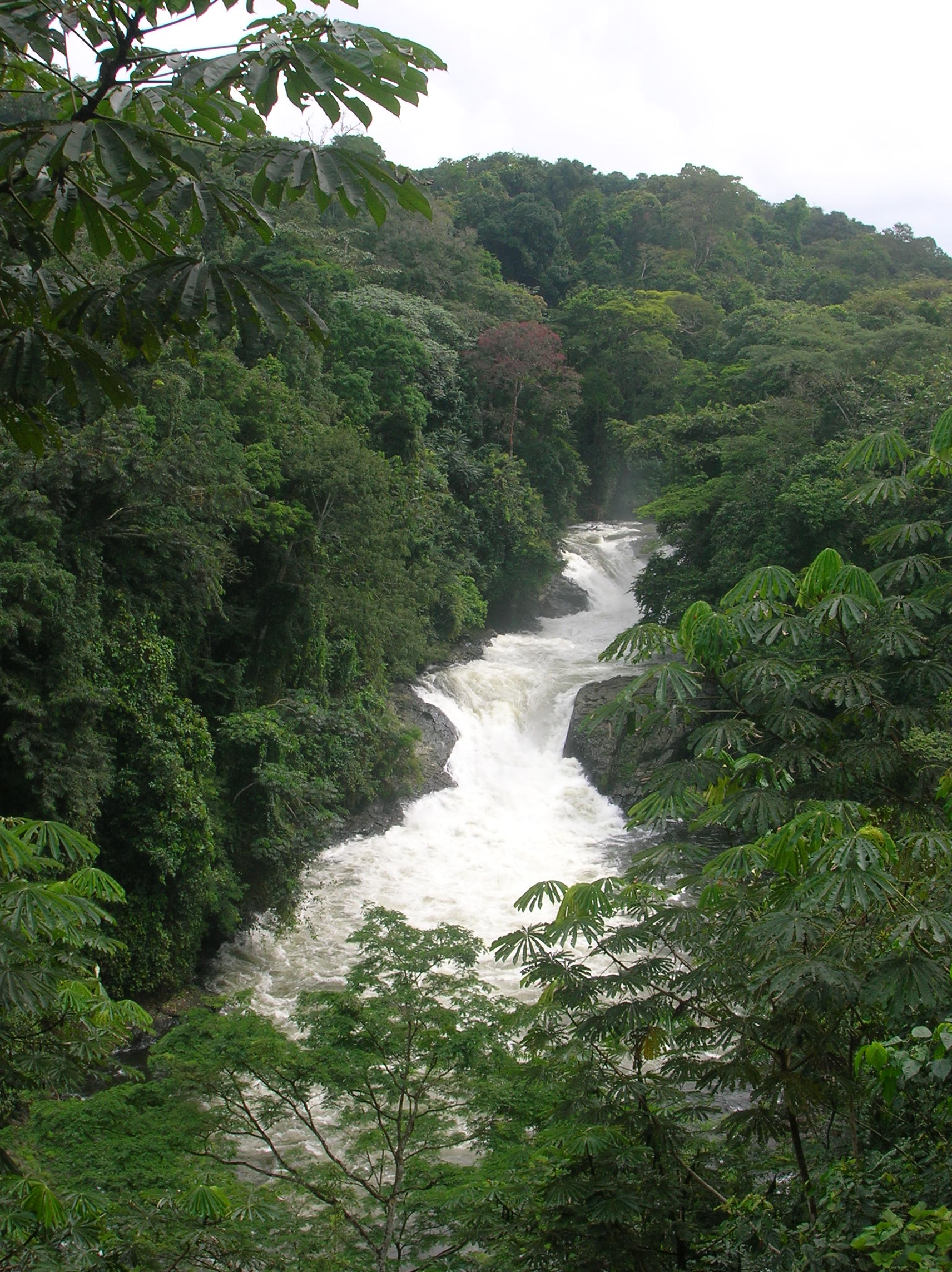
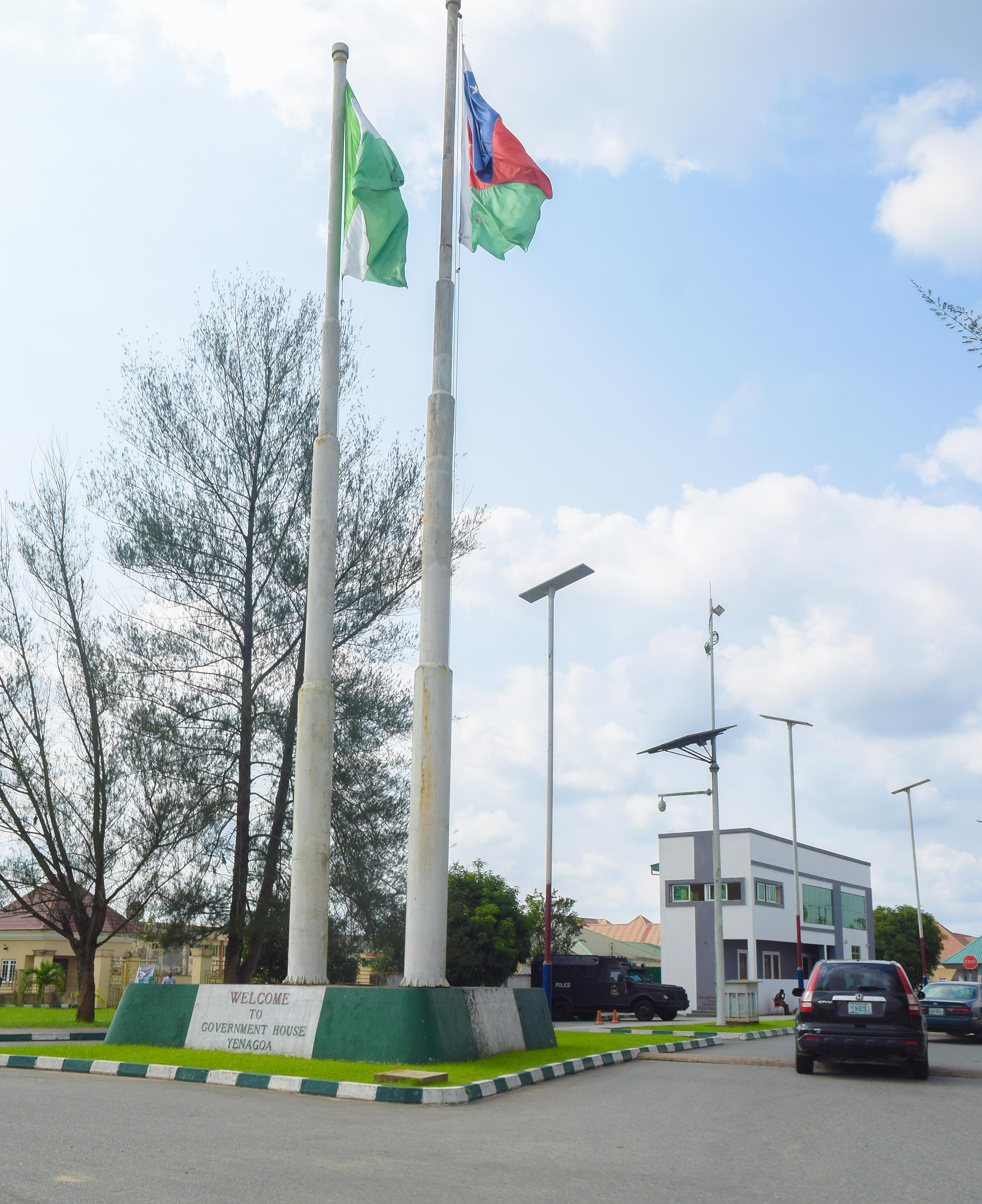
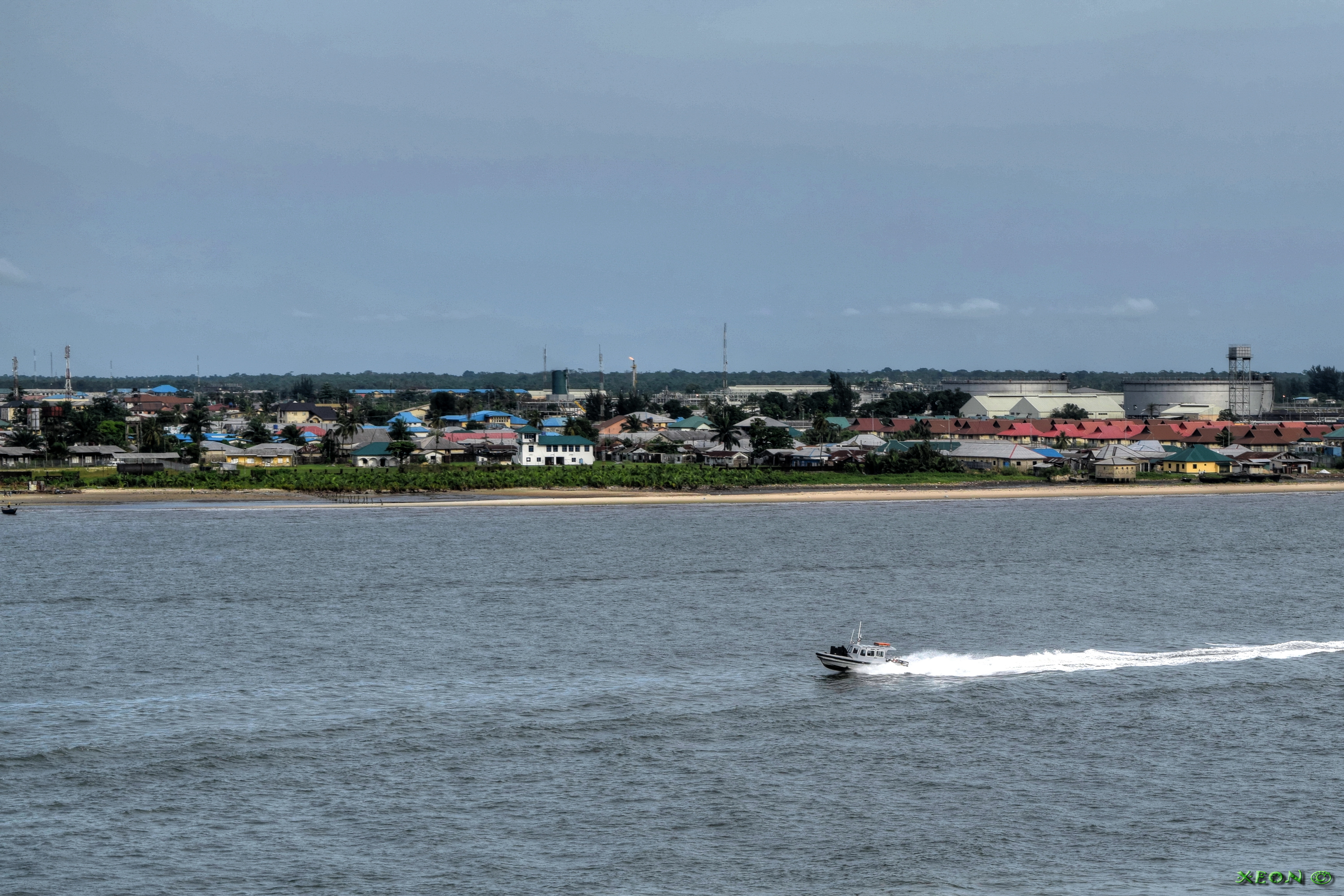
- From top, left to right: Ibeno Beach, Ososo Hills, River Niger Bridge, Cross River National Park, Yenagoa, Bonny Island
- Interactive map of South-South
- Country: Nigeria
- States: Akwa Ibom State; Bayelsa State; Cross River State; Delta State; Edo State; Rivers State
- Largest city: Benin City
- Major cities: Benin City; Port Harcourt; Warri/Uvwie; Calabar; Uyo; Ikot Ekpene; Ugep; Sapele; Buguma; Ekpoma; Uromi; Auchi; Ughelli; Ikom; Agbor; Asaba; Yenagoa

Population
  - Total: 26,000,000
- Time zone: UTC+1 (WAT)
- Languages: Annang; Boki; Edo; Efik; Ekoi; English; Esan; Etsako; Ibibio; Igbo; Ika; Ikwerre; Isoko; Itsekiri; Izon; Kalabari; Obolo; Ogba; Etsako; Ogoni; Oro; Urhobo; Epie Atissa; Ukwuani; Yala; Yakö; Yoruba

The six geopolitical zones of Nigeria

The South-South is one of the six geopolitical zones of Nigeria. It designates both a geographic and political region of the country's eastern coast. It comprises six states – Akwa Ibom, Bayelsa, Cross River, Delta, Edo, and Rivers.

The zone stretches along the Atlantic seaboard from the Bight of Benin coast in the west to the Bight of Bonny coast in the east. It encloses much of the Niger Delta, which is instrumental in the environment and economic development of the region. Geographically, the zone is divided with the Central African mangroves in the coastal far south while the major inland ecoregions are–from east to west–the Cross–Sanaga–Bioko coastal forests, Cross–Niger transition forests, Niger Delta swamp forests, and Nigerian lowland forests.

Although the South-South represents only ~10% of Nigerian territory by land area, it contributes greatly to the Nigerian economy due to extensive oil and natural gas reserves. The zone has a population of over 40 million people, around 12% of the total population of the country. Port Harcourt, Benin City, Uyo, and Calabar with Port Harcourt and Benin City being the most populous cities in the South-South, and the fourth- and fifth-most populous cities, respectively, in the country. Port Harcourt and its suburbs, together called Greater Port Harcourt, form the largest metropolitan area in the zone, with about 3 million people. Other large South-South cities include (in descending order by population) Warri/Uvwie, Eket, Abak, Ikot Ekpene, Ugep, Sapele, Buguma, Uromi, Ughelli, Ikom, Asaba and Agbor.

== History ==
The South-South Region was created from parts of both the Western and Eastern regions of Nigeria in 1997 through the recommendation of the Alex Ekwueme panel, by the national regime of General Sani Abacha.

Edo, Delta, one-quarter of Bayelsa, and the Ndoni section of Rivers states were from the old Western region. Three-quarters of the area of Bayelsa, Rivers, Akwa Ibom and Cross River states were from the old Eastern region.

== Tribes in South South Nigeria ==
Tribes in South South Nigeria includes,Edo, Esan, Ibibio, Igbo, Yoruba, Ijaw, Urhobo, Ika, Ukwuani, Etsakor, Owan, Igala, Ekpeye, Ikwerre, Isoko, Efik, Annang, Oron, and Itsekiri among others.

== Nigerian South South Capital City ==
Uyo is considered as the capital city of Nigerian South South Region with the location of the Nigerian South South Development Commission in the city. This is different from the Capital City of Nigerian Niger Delta that is at Port Harcourt where the Niger Delta Development Commission is located.

== Environment ==
=== Protected areas ===
| Protected area | Location | Area | | | |
|---|---|---|---|---|---|
| Protected area | Location | Area | Afi Mountain Wildlife Sanctuary | Northern Cross River State | 104 km^{2} (40 sq mi) |
| Afi River Forest Reserve | Northern Cross River State | 312 km^{2} (120 sq mi) | | | |
| Cross River National Park | Cross River State | ~4,000 km^{2} (~1544 sq mi) | | | |
| Edumanom Forest Reserve | Southeastern Bayelsa State and Southwestern Rivers State | 93.24 km^{2} (36.00 sq mi) | | | |
| Mbe Mountains Community Forest | Northern Cross River State | 86 km^{2} (33 sq mi) | | | |
| Ohosu Game Reserve | Southern Edo State | 471 km^{2} (182 sq mi) | | | |
| Okomu Forest Reserve | Southern Edo State | 1,082 km^{2} (418 sq mi) | | | |
| Okomu National Park | Southern Edo State | 181 km^{2} (70 sq mi) | | | |

== Demographics ==
=== Languages ===
- Akwa Ibom
  - Ibibio
  - Annang
  - Igbo
  - Efik-Ibibio
  - Oron language
  - Obolo language
- Bayelsa
  - Izon
  - Ogbia
  - Epie
- Cross River
  - Efik
  - Ibibio-Efik
  - Humono
  - Yala
  - Nde-nsele-nta
  - Igbo
  - Bokyi
  - Etung
  - Legbo-Agbo
  - Ejagham
  - Ekoi
  - Ekajuk
  - Yakurr
  - Efut
  - Kiong
- Delta
  - Enuani
  - Urhobo
  - Isoko
  - Ika
  - Ukwuani
  - Itsekiri
  - Igbo
  - Ndokwa
  - Yoruba
  - Izon etc.
- Edo
  - Owan
  - Esan
  - Etsako
  - Yoruba
  - Ika Igbanke
  - Bini
- Rivers
  - Andoni
  - Okrika
  - Kalabari
  - Engenni
  - Ikwerre
  - Ogba
  - Etche .
  - Ekpeye
  - Ndoki
  - Igbo
  - Ukwuani
  - Egbema
  - Ijaw
  - Nkoro
  - Ogoni
  - Degema
  - Abua
  - Odual

== Administration ==
=== Regional development authorities ===
On a federal level, the Ministry of Niger Delta Affairs and its parastatal – the Niger Delta Development Commission – cover the South-South in addition to three other oil-producing states (Abia, Imo, and Ondo). Unlike the development authorities of other zones like the North-East Development Commission, the present authorities are responsible for the areas outside of the South-South as the NDDC was created in response to protests and conflict in the wider Niger Delta region. Nonetheless, the creation of a South-South Development Commission has been repeatedly proposed by some lawmakers in the late 2010s and 2020s, with proponents advocating fairness with the other zones' commissions while opponents deride the proposal as redundant. The remit of the current development agencies includes ecological protection and infrastructure development; however, both the ministry and commission have long been beset by corruption and mismanagement that has led to the abandonment or failure of many projects.

=== States and local government areas ===
| Name | Code | Seal | Location | City | | Local government areas | Area | Population (2019 estimate) |
| Name | Code | Seal | Location | Capital | Largest | Local government areas | Area | Population (2019 estimate) |
|---|---|---|---|---|---|---|---|---|
| Akwa Ibom | AK | | | Uyo | | 31 | 7,081 km^{2} (2,734 sq mi) | 4,780,581 |
| Bayelsa | BY | | | Yenagoa | | 8 | 10,773 km^{2} (4,159 sq mi) | 2,394,725 |
| Cross River | CR | | | Calabar | | 18 | 20,156 km^{2} (7,782 sq mi) | 4,175,020 |
| Delta | DE | | | Asaba | | 25 | 17,698 km^{2} (6,833 sq mi) | 5,307,543 |
| Edo | ED | | | Benin City | | 18 | 19,559 km^{2} (7,552 sq mi) | 4,461,137 |
| Rivers | RI | | | Port Harcourt | | 23 | 11,077 km^{2} (4,277 sq mi) | 7,034,973 |

=== Politics ===
Although the areas that now comprise the South-South were electorally competitive during the first, second, and aborted third republics, every state in the region consistently voted for the nominees of the Peoples Democratic Party in fourth republic presidential elections from 1999 to 2019. After Olusegun Obasanjo won the South-South by substantial margins of victory in 1999 and 2003, Goodluck Jonathan – an indigene of Bayelsa State – expanded PDP margins greatly in 2011 and 2015. However, PDP margins of victory decreased in 2019, when Atiku Abubakar was the party nominee. In 2023, with Abubakar again as the PDP nominee, four South-South states broke their streaks of PDP voting – with Rivers being won by Bola Tinubu (APC) amid widespread irregularities while Cross River, Delta, and Edo voted for Peter Obi (LP).

==== In presidential elections ====
Presidential votes in South-South states in the Fourth Republic:

| Year | Akwa Ibom | Bayelsa | Cross River | Delta | Edo | Rivers |
|---|---|---|---|---|---|---|
| 1999 | Obasanjo (PDP) | Obasanjo (PDP) | Obasanjo (PDP) | Obasanjo (PDP) | Obasanjo (PDP) | Obasanjo (PDP) |
| 2003 | Obasanjo (PDP) | Obasanjo (PDP) | Obasanjo (PDP) | Obasanjo (PDP) | Obasanjo (PDP) | Obasanjo (PDP) |
| 2007 | N/A (Note: State-by-state totals were never released by the Independent National Electoral Commission in 2007 amid widespread reports of electoral irregularities and fraud.) | | | | | |
| 2011 | Jonathan (PDP) | Jonathan (PDP) | Jonathan (PDP) | Jonathan (PDP) | Jonathan (PDP) | Jonathan (PDP) |
| 2015 | Jonathan (PDP) | Jonathan (PDP) | Jonathan (PDP) | Jonathan (PDP) | Jonathan (PDP) | Jonathan (PDP) |
| 2019 | Abubakar (PDP) | Abubakar (PDP) | Abubakar (PDP) | Abubakar (PDP) | Abubakar (PDP) | Abubakar (PDP) |
| 2023 | Abubakar (PDP) | Abubakar (PDP) | Obi (LP) | Obi (LP) | Obi (LP) | Tinubu (APC) |
