= Bokyi =

Bokyi may refer to:

- Bokyi people
- Bokyi language
- Ivan Bokyi (1942–2020), Ukrainian journalist and politician

== See also ==
- Bokyi (surname)
