= Boki =

Boki may refer to:

- The Boki people of Nigeria
- The Boki language
- Boki, Nigeria, a Local Government Area of Nigeria

== People ==
- Boki (surname)
- Boki (Hawaiian chief) (before 1785–after 1829), Royal Governor of Oahu
- Boki Milošević (1931–2018), Serbian clarinetist
- Boki Nachbar (born 1980), Slovenian basketball player
