= Victor Abang =

Nigerian politician

Bisong Victor Abang

Federal Representative
- Preceded by: Chris Ngoro Agibe
- Constituency: Boki/Ikom

Personal details
- Born: Victor Bisong Abang; 4 November 1967 (age 58) Bawop, Cross River State, Nigeria
- Occupation: Politician

Victor Abang (born on 11 April 1967) is a Nigerian politician who currently serves as a member of the Federal House of Representatives, representing Boki/Ikom constituency of Cross River State in the 10th National Assembly. He succeeded Chris Ngoro Agibe.

== Early life ==
He was born in Bawop, Boki Local Government Area of Cross River State on 11 April 1967.

== Political career ==
Victor Abang served as Chief Legislative Aide to Senate President Ken Nnamani from 2005 to 2007. He later served as Special Assistant on Public Affairs to the President of the Senate from 2007 to 2016.

From 2016 to 2019 he served as the chief of staff to the chairman of the Niger Delta Development Commission (NDDC).

He was elected to the House of Representatives in 2023, representing the Ikom/Boki Federal Constituency.

In May 2026, Abang emerged as the All Progressives Congress (APC) candidate for the Ikom/Boki Federal Constituency after the party resolved internal disagreements over a proposed consensus arrangement and conducted direct primaries in the constituency.

== Legislative activities ==
As a member of the House of Representatives, Victor Abang has supported and engaged in legislative activities focused on security, community development, and constituency representation.

In 2023, he introduced a bill seeking the establishment of an Elite Sheriff Corps, which passed its first reading in the House of Representatives.

He also introduced the bills seeking for the establishments of a Federal College of Agriculture and Forestry in Okundi, Boki; a Federal Medical Centre in Boki; and the Federal College of Education (Technical) in Ikom.

He has raised concerns over insecurity affecting border communities in Cross River State and has called for government intervention to address the situation.

Abang has also participated in peace building efforts aimed at resolving communal disputes between the Boje and Isobendeghe communities in Cross River State.

He has undertaken constituency projects and empowerment programmes across the Ikom/Boki Federal Constituency during his tenure in the National Assembly.
