= Bete language =

Bete language may refer to:

- Bété language, a language of Ivory Coast
- Bete language (Nigeria)
- Bete-Bendi language
