= Ubang language =

Bendi language of Nigeria

Ubang
- Native to: Nigeria
- Region: Cross River State
- Native speakers: 11,000 (2013)
- Language family: Niger–Congo?: Atlantic–Congo; Volta-Congo; Benue–Congo; Bantoid; Southern Bantoid; Bendi; Ubang

Language codes
- ISO 639-3: uba
- Glottolog: uban1243

Ubang is a Bendi language spoken in Obudu, Nigeria. It is notable for having different vocabulary for male and female speakers.

== Male and female differences in the language ==
In the Ubang language, there are masculine and feminine forms of communication. Men are designated to speak the masculine form of the language and women, likewise, speak the feminine form of the language. This form of communication is understandable by both men and women. However, children speak the female language until approximately ten years of age.

Anthropologist Chi Chi Undie commented: "It's almost like two different lexicons... There are a lot of words that men and women share in common, then there are others which are totally different depending on your sex. They don't sound alike, they don't have the same letters, they are completely different words."

=== Examples of words in male and female Ubang ===
English	Male Ubang	Female Ubang
dog	abu	akwakwe
tree	kitchi	okweng
water	bamuie	amu
cup	nko	ogbala
clothing	nki	ariga
bush	bibiang	déyirè
goat	ibue	obi
