= Afi River Forest Reserve =

Protected area of Nigeria

- IUCN category V (protected landscape/seascape)
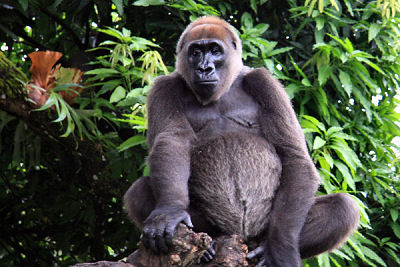
- Cross River gorilla, a critically endangered species

- Location within Nigeria
- Location: Cross River State, Nigeria
- Coordinates: 6°11′53″N 8°58′36″E
- Area: 312 km^{2} (120 sq mi)

The Afi River Forest Reserve is in Cross River State, Nigeria, and covers 312 square kilometres (120 sq mi). It is one of the largest forest blocks esiting in the state other than the Cross River National Park. The reserve lies between the Afi Mountain Wildlife Sanctuary and Mbe Mountains Community Forest, both of which are home to Cross River gorillas and forms a corridor between the two. A 2008 report noted that increasing levels of logging, farming and hunting were placing the gorillas under threat.

The development of the Nigerian super highway project has attracted the attention of the international public due to its great impact on the Afi Mountain Wildlife Sanctuary and the living world in it. Forest elephants, Nigerian-Cameroon chimpanzees, drills, pangolins, short-legged crocodiles and many others will be endangered.
