= BZY =

BZY or bzy may refer to:

- BZY, the IATA code for Bălți International Airport, Moldova
- bzy, the ISO 639-3 code for Obanliku language, Nigeria
