= Boky =

Boky may refer to:

- Boky-boky or narrow-striped mongoose
- Colette Boky (born 1935), Canadian operatic soprano
- Gleb Boky (1879–1937), Soviet politician and Cheka officer

== See also ==
- Bokyi (surname)
