= Chris Ngoro Agibe =

Nigerian politician (born 1961)

Chris Ngoro Agibe (1961-2025)

Federal Representative
- Succeeded by: Bisong Victor Abang
- Constituency: Boki/Ikom

Personal details
- Born: 1961 death = 2025
- Education: University of Ife
- Occupation: Politician, Engineer

Christopher Ngoro Agibe is a Nigerian politician and engineer. He was a member representing Boki/Ikom Federal Constituency in the House of Representatives.

== Early life, education and political career ==
Chris Ngoro Agibe was born in 1961 and hails from Cross River State. He completed his secondary education at Comprehensive Secondary School Ikom, Cross River State in 1978. He bagged a bachelor's degree in engineering from the University of Ife, Ile-Ife, Osun State in 1984. He was elected as a federal lawmaker in 2019 and served until 2023. He was succeeded by Bisong Victor Abang. Between 1986 and 1990, he served as the Commission Officer, NA-Army Engineering. He was the Head of Sustainable Energy, United Cement Company from 2007 to 2012.
