= Boki, Nigeria =

Boki Bokyi Nki
- Local Government Area
- Interactive map of Boki
- Location in Nigeria
- Coordinates: 6°16′26″N 9°00′36″E
- Country: Nigeria
- State: Cross River State
- Headquarters: Boje

Government
  - Local Government Chairman: Eti-Eka, Hon. Mrs Beatrice Etta Nyiam

Area
  - Total: 2,771 km^{2} (1,070 sq mi)

Population (2006)
  - Total: 186,611
  - Density: 67.3/km^{2} (174/sq mi)
- Time zone: UTC+1 (WAT)
- Website: www.bokilgc.cr.gov.ng

Boki (/bɒki/; Boki language: Bokyi) is a Local Government Area in the Cross River State of Nigeria. It was created on 28 August 1991, and its capital is Boje. The region has a contiguous border with the Republic of Cameroon and is known internationally as a commercial centre for agricultural commodities such as cocoa, coffee, timber, and palm products.

== Etymology ==
The origin of its name comes from the native tribe (Boki people) who reside in the area. The term originates from the word Bokyi, which is the name of the tribe in the Boki language although it is also referred to as Nki.

== Geography ==
Boki is a landlocked Local Government Area of Nigeria (LGA) bounded by the Republic of Cameroon to the east as well as five other Cross River State's LGAs: Obudu and Obanliku in the north, Ikom and Ogoja in the west, and Etung to the south.

The region is considered to have some of the most rugged terrain in Nigeria, for it is almost completely covered by the Cross River Rainforest (one of the last remaining in the country) and the Afi mountain range (60% of which is inaccessible to vehicles throughout the year).

Cross River National Park

The area is also prone to mudslides due to frequent high levels of rainfall. In July 2014, mudslides swept away bridges which isolated many communities including the region's capitol, Boje.

In 2001, six autonomous communities in the Local Government Area protested the State's refusal to create a separate Boki North council and threatened to join neighboring Cameroon. Boki local government area is the agricultural hub of Cross River State and one of the largest local government areas in the state surrounded with rain forest, it is known for massive palm oil production.

The district has many settlements including Bamba.

== Culture and customs ==
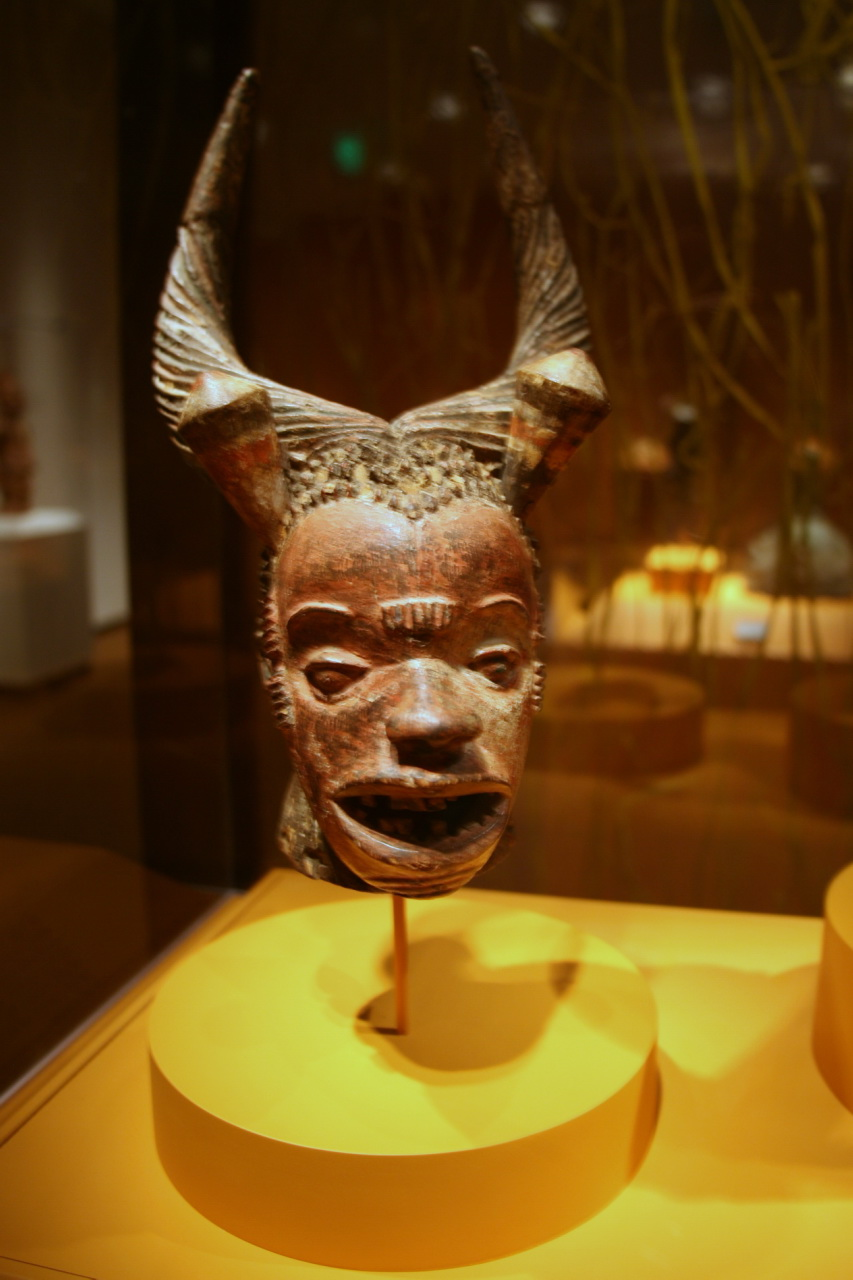
Boki tribal mask

The Boki people give the region different traditions and customs that are unique to the district. Traditional dress for men consists of loincloths and a white long-sleeved shirt with a broad hat. Some men also carry a walking stick. Women usually wear wrappers or a blouse, and head scarf.

Major events include the Boki New Yam Festival, Alobe festival in Irruan and Etcen in Borum & Cassava Festivals. Music and dance are common in Boki culture and are played during festivals as well as social occasions. Common instruments include: the Obam, Mgbe, Ndugho, Etcheh, Atam, Obon, Bekarim, Awaribo, Obashi and Enya-Atu. Other traditions include inter-village cultural dance, festivals, age-grade meetings, burial ceremonies and communal farming.

Boki is notorious for its practice of male and female circumcision, as well as forced marriages. In July 2000, female genital mutilation was made illegal by the government of Cross River State in an attempt to stop violence and abuse against women. The penalty for such actions is a fine of up to 10,000 naira (US$62) or a prison sentence up three years.

Boki is also known for its traditional African markets and many towns have their own market days, such as in Okundi, Ntamarte, Kakwagom, Wula and Katchuan.

== Ecology ==
The vast wildlife habitats within the thickly forested vegetation and unique topology of Boki continue to interest environmental activists as well as conservationist groups. The Okwango Division of the Cross River Park, set up by the World Wide Fund for Nature (WWF), was established in Boki. It provides visitors an opportunity to witness wildlife in its natural habitat.

== Afi Mountain Wildlife Sanctuary ==
The Afi Mountain Wildlife Sanctuary was created in May 2000 and is managed by the Cross River State Forestry Commission. The protection and research of the wildlife sanctuary are sponsored by a partnership between the government and four NGOs: Pandrillus, Wildlife Conservation Society, Nigerian Conservation Foundation and Fauna & Flora International.

Afi's gorillas belong to the most endangered subspecies of the Cross River gorilla. Generations of hunting Afi's gorillas, chimpanzees, drills and other endangered species have left them wary of humans, and years of protection may be required before they are more easily seen again.

Day hikes or multi-day treks into the sanctuary can be arranged by the Drill Ranch. Guided hikes are available for additional fees, which the Drill Ranch collects on behalf of the Forestry Commission.

Afi Mountain is listed as an ‘Important Bird Area’ for Nigeria, and the migratory swallow-roost at Boje is one of the largest in Africa. Birdwatchers are welcome, but mist-netting is not permitted except by special arrangement with the state wildlife authorities.

== Communal wars and political unrest ==
Over the years, Boki has had communal wars, most recently in 2010 in a farmland tussle between the Nsadop and Boje communities. The war claimed an estimated 230 million naira in property damage, about 400 people died, and approximately 6,000 people were affected by the war. The government took over the rebuilding processes of the village, building hundreds of two-bedroom flats as compensation for the burnt or demolished houses of over 6,000 victims. Damaged fence walls are still being reconstructed and homes are still undergoing repairs, including destroyed and looted furniture and fittings using relief funds.

== Notable people ==
- Matthew Tawo Mbu, politician and diplomat
