= BYP =

BYP may refer to:

- Barimunya Airport (IATA airport code: BYP), Pilbara region, Western Australia, Australia
- Baijnathpur (train station code: BYP), Bihar, India; see List of railway stations in India
- Bypass (road) (abbrev. Byp.)
- Bumaji language (ISO 639 code: byp)
- Bunyip railway station, Australia
- BYP, a symbol for bypass in EBCDIC
