= Putukwam language =

Bendi language spoken in Nigeria

Putukwam
- Native to: Nigeria
- Region: Obudu LGA, Cross River State
- Native speakers: 70,000 (2012)
- Language family: Niger–Congo?: Atlantic–Congo; Benue–Congo; Southern Bantoid?; Bendi; Putukwam
- Dialects: Afrike; Obe

Language codes
- ISO 639-3: afe
- Glottolog: putu1241

Putukwam (Utugwang-Irungene-Afrike) is a Bendi language of Obudu LGA, Cross River State, Nigeria.

== Dialects ==
Ethnologue and Glottolog list dialects as:

- Afrike (Aferike, Utumane)
- Irungene (Mbe Afal, Mbe East, Mbube Eastern, Obe, Upper Mbe)
- Mgbenege (Ngbenege)
- Okworogung (Ukworogung)
- Ukwortung (Okorotung)
- Utugwang (Otukwang, Utukwang)

Roger Blench (2019) lists dialects as:

- Obe
- Mgbenege
- Utugwang
- Okwọrọgung
- Okwọrọtung
