= Obanliku language =

Bendi language of Nigeria

Obanliku
- Banliku, Abanliku, Abanglekuo
- Native to: Nigeria
- Native speakers: (65,000 cited 1989)
- Language family: Niger–Congo?: Atlantic–Congo; Benue–Congo; Southern Bantoid?; Bendi; Obanliku
- Dialects: Basang; Bebi; Bishiri; Bisu; Busi

Language codes
- ISO 639-3: bzy
- Glottolog: oban1244

Obanliku (Banliku, Abanliku, Abanglekuo) is a Bendi language of Nigeria. There are five dialects or varieties: Bisu, Busi, Bishiri, Basang and Bebi.

In a 2011 survey, it was found that the Bisu, Busi, Bishiri and Bebi dialects share above 75% lexical similarity and are mutually intelligible, but the southwestern Basang dialect had less than 75%, causing some difficulty for speakers of the other dialects. Basang speakers could understand the other dialects, however. Additionally, all Obanliku speakers have some understanding of the neighbouring Bete-Bendi language, mainly through learning it at the market; the Obanliku and Bete-Bendi languages also had an average of 70% lexical similarity.

== See also ==
- Bete-Bendi language
