= Cross River National Park =

National park in Nigeria

- IUCN category II (national park)
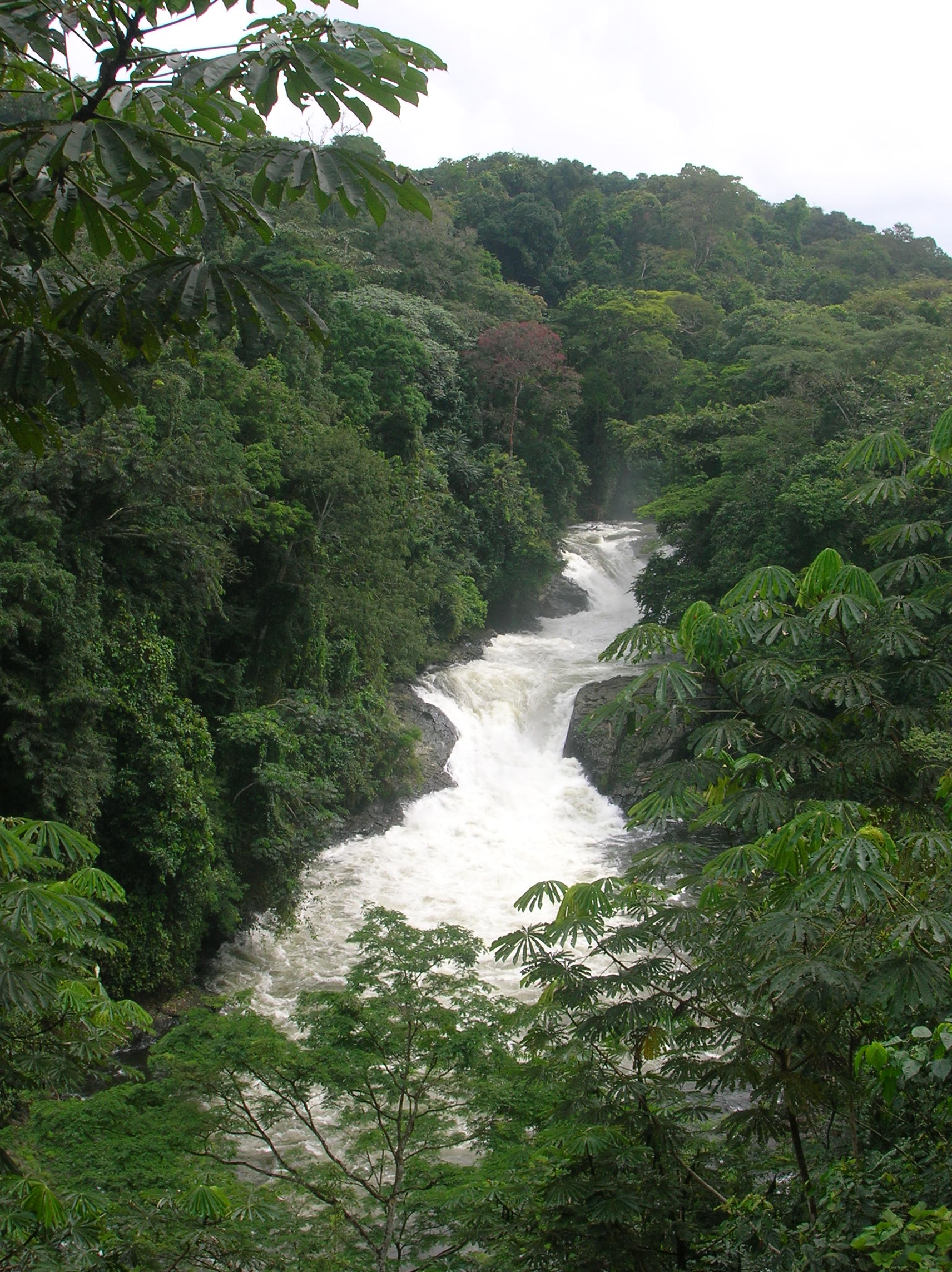
- Kwa Falls, Cross River National Park

- Location within Nigeria
- Location: Cross River State, Nigeria
- Coordinates: 5.580451°N 8.748379°E
- Area: 4,000 km^{2} (1,500 sq mi)
- Established: 1991

The Cross River National Park is a national park of Nigeria, located in Cross River State, Nigeria. There are two separate sections, Okwangwo (established 1991) and Oban (established 1988). The park has a total area of about 4,000 km^{2}, most of which consists of primary moist tropical rainforests in the North and Central parts, with mangrove swamps on the coastal zones. Parts of the park belong to the Guinea-Congolian region, with a closed canopy and scattered emergent trees reaching 40 or 50 metres (130 or 160 feet) in height.

Cross River National Park borders Korup National Park in Cameroon and is the largest rain forest area in Nigeria. It is also a hotspot for biodiversity. The park has one of the oldest rainforests in Africa, and has been identified as a biodiversity hot spot. Sixteen primate species have been recorded in the park. Rare primates include common chimpanzees, drills and (in Okwangwo) Cross River gorillas. Another primate, the gray-cheeked mangabey, seems to have recently become extinct in the area.

Both divisions of the park are threatened by illegal logging, slash and burn farming and poaching. Eco-tourism may support efforts to preserve the park fauna. Assisting villagers in buffer zones to practice sustainable forestry also holds promise.

The Okwangwo Division and the Oban Division are the two non-contiguous divisions of the Central Riverine National Park (CRNP), one of eight national parks in Nigeria. The Nigerian National Park Service (NNPS), which reports to the Federal Ministry of the Environment and is headed by a Conservator General, is in charge of the CRNP. A Conservator of Parks oversees every National Park in Nigeria.

The Guinean Forests of West Africa include the CRNP. With two distinct seasons—a dry season (November to March) and a rainy season (March to November), its vegetation is made mostly of moist lowland rainforest. The daily average temperature ranges from 14 °C (57 °F) to 25 °C (77 °F), while the annual rainfall falls between 2,000 and 3,000 millimetres (79 and 118 inches). Many endemic and severely endangered species, like the Cross River gorilla Gorilla gorilla diehli, which inhabits the Okwangwo Division, may be found in the CRNP, a Pleistocene biodiversity refuge. The national park is an Important Bird and Biodiversity Area and is included in the UN's list of the 25 Biodiversity Hotspots in the World.

== History ==
Park locations

The park was first proposed in 1965, but serious planning did not start until 1988. The World Wide Fund for Nature - UK played a leading role for the plan to establish the park in two divisions separated by farmland and the Cross River valley, with a budget of $49.9 million. The plan envisaged villagers in the buffer zone being involved in running the park and being given development aid.

The Cross River National Park (CRNP) was established by the Federal Ministry Government Decree in 1991, with the Cross River gorilla chosen as the theme animal. The original plan was not fully implemented, and the park established in 1991 only included existing forest reserves. After a small amount of initial aid, the funding dried up and the villagers became hostile to the park administration. An amending decree in 1999 converted the Nigerian National Park Service, which runs the park, into a paramilitary outfit with increased powers.The park was created in 1991 and borders the Takamanda and Korup national parks in Cameroon. It also crosses with five local government areas (Obanliku, Boki, Etung, Ikom, and Akampka). Because of its proximity to PA in Cameroon, the CRNP could be a component of a bigger transboundary PA. With the creation of the park, some 105 buffer zone settlements were formed, some of which were enclave towns inside the park.

The local populations' ability to lawfully utilize the forest's resources was taken away when the CRNP and its borders were established in 1991. Because the ICDP and relocation initiatives did not yield substitute means of subsistence, the local residents are left with no choice but to continue utilizing the CRNP's resources—albeit with illegal implications. As a result, the local populations in the CRNP become the drivers of forest fragmentation.

== Organisation ==
The Nigeria National Park Service is an agency of the Federal Ministry of Environment, Housing & Urban Development. The Cross River National Park is headed by a Director under the guidance of a Park Management Committee. The park management has established a station at Kanyang as a base for primate research and eco-tourism. The Butatong Divisional Head Office, established with assistance from the European Union and the World Wildlife Fund provides a base for rangers patrolling the Okwa and Okwangwo sectors of the Okwangwo division.

The park has four departments: Park Protection and Conservation, Ecotourism, Park Engineering and Maintenance, and Finance and Administration. In 2010, 250 of the total 320 personnel worked in Park Protection and Conservation, mostly male due to the rigors of the job, based at twelve ranger stations. This number is inadequate given the size of the territory to be patrolled. Despite attempts at training, many of the rangers are poorly qualified and are dissatisfied with pay, equipment, motivation and career prospects.

== Oban Hills Division ==
=== Location ===
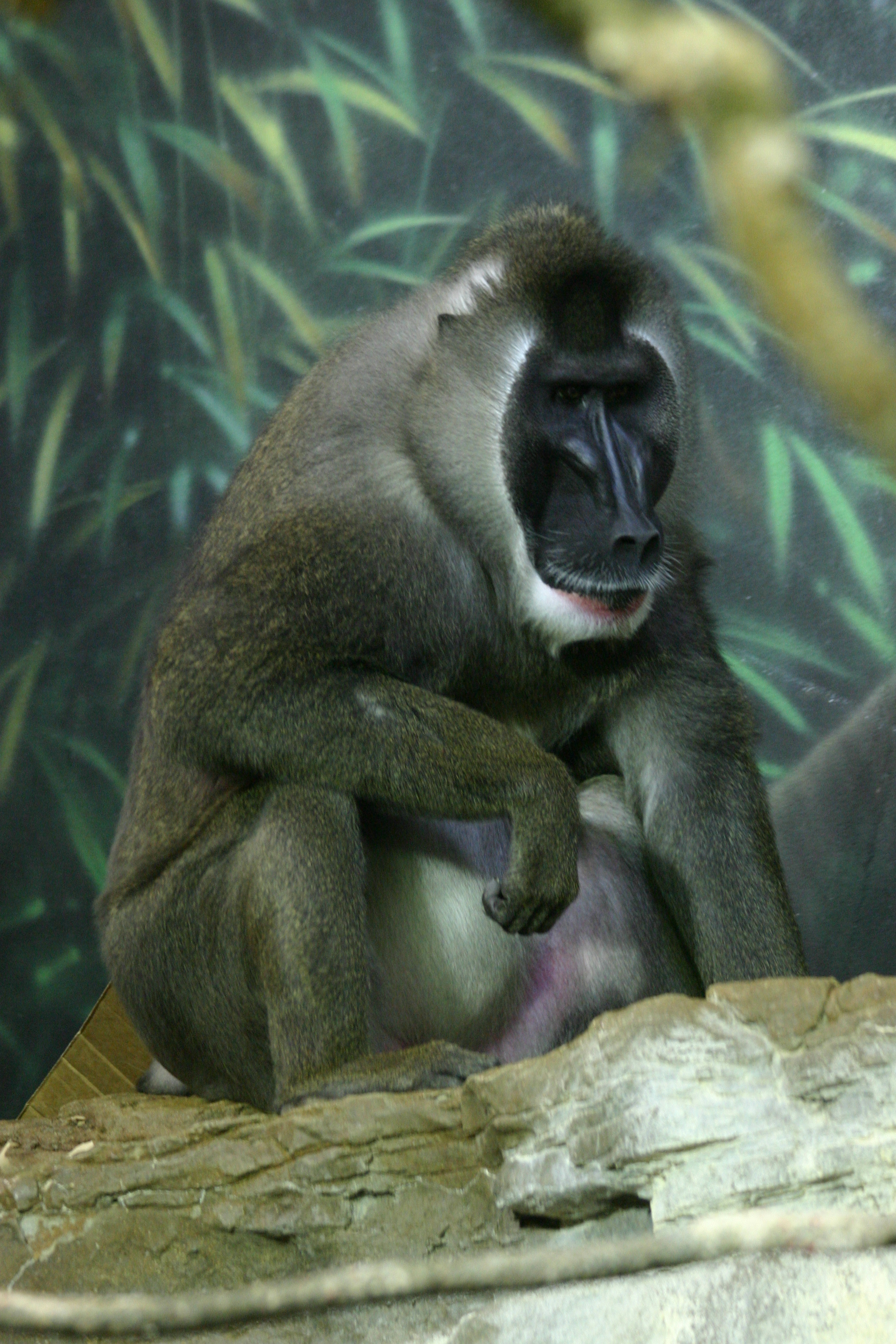
Drill, an endangered primate related to the mandrill

The Oban Hills Division is 2,800 km^{2} in area, centered on coordinates 5°25′0″N 8°35′0″E. The division shares a long border with Korup National Park in the Republic of Cameroon, forming a single protected ecological zone.

The land area of the Oban Division is 300,000 ha (1,200 sq mi). In 1991, it was separated from the Oban Group Forest Reserve. It is located in the south-eastern part of the Cross River State in Akamkpa Local Government Area. It is located roughly 42 kilometres (26 miles) from Calabar, the state capital, and shares an eastern border with Cameroon's Korup National Park.

The Oban Division and Korup National Park are adjacent. The Oban Division's southern regions are drained by the Kwa, Korup, and Calabar Rivers, while the northern portions are drained by the Cross River and its tributaries. The environment is rugged, with elevation rising in hilly areas from river basins to more than a thousand meters above sea level. January temperatures typically range from 25 to 27 degrees Celsius or 77 to 81 degrees Fahrenheit, but in July they typically soar to little over 30 degrees (86 degrees Fahrenheit). In January, relative humidity ranges from 75% to 95%, but harmattan causes it to steadily decrease as the year goes on. There is lowland rain forest vegetation. The forest has not been greatly affected by human activity in the less accessible parts, but human activity has had a significant impact on the vegetation in other locations.

The division has a rugged terrain, rising from 100 m in the river valleys to over 1,000 m in the mountains. The soils are highly vulnerable to leaching and erosion where stripped of plant cover. The rainy season lasts from March to November, with annual rainfall of over 3,500 millimetres or 11.5 feet. The northern part is drained by the Cross river and its tributaries. The southern parts are drained by the Calabar, Kwa and Korup rivers.

=== Biodiversity ===
The division is mostly covered with lowland rainforest. Typical tree species include Musanga cecropioides (the African corkwood tree or umbrella tree), Irvingia gabonensis, Berlinia confusa, Coula edulis, Hannoa klaineana, Klainedoxa gabonensis, African mahogany and red ironwood. About 1,568 plant species have been identified, of which 77 are endemic to Nigeria. These include 1,303 flowering plants, 141 lichens and 56 moss species. Torben Larsen collected almost 600 species of butterfly in the Oban division in 1995, and estimated that there may be 950 species in total in the division.

Although the park has been poorly explored, over 350 bird species have been recorded. It is one of the two parts of Nigeria where Xavier's greenbul is found. Other species unusual in Nigeria include bat hawk, Cassin's hawk-eagle, crested guineafowl, grey-throated rail, olive long-tailed cuckoo, bare-cheeked trogon, lyre-tailed honeyguide, green-backed bulbul, grey-throated tit-flycatcher and Rachel's malimbe. 42 species of snake have been counted. There are at least 75 mammal species, including the African buffalo, the endangered African forest elephants, common chimpanzee, Preuss's red colobus and Sclater's guenon and the highly endangered drill. The division may contain 400 chimpanzees, although no survey has been undertaken.

=== Concerns ===
The forest remains largely untouched in the less accessible areas, but around the margins it has been considerably affected by human activity. In some places, secondary regrowth has occurred, but other areas contain plantations of oil-palm and rubber. Illegal logging is a serious threat, and has been increasing. The population of villages in the buffer zone is growing, and farmers are starting to encroach. Levels of hunting, fishing and transitory cultivation are increasing, and damaging the ecosystem. Chemicals used for fishing have affected fish stocks.

An approach to involving local communities in management of forests in the buffer zones has been tested with some success in the old and new Ekuri villages in the northwestern part of the Oban division. The villagers have rights to about 250 km^{2} of forest land, and were living by subsistence agriculture and sale of high-value forest products, including the meat of endangered species such as chimpanzee and drill. The Ekuri Community Forestry Project was set up with the help of park officials and foreign donors to improve management of the forest and access to markets. With training and financial support, the villagers established ways to harvest the forest in a sustainable way, and now have a vested interest in its preservation. This contrasts to the negative effects usually seen when external logging or plantation companies enter an area such as this.

== Okwangwo Division ==
Okwankwo division and bordering protected areas

=== Location ===
The Okwangwo division is centered on coordinates 6°17′00″N 9°14′00″E. It is made up of the former Boshi, Okwangwo and Boshi Extension Forest Reserves. The division has an area of about 920 km^{2} at an altitude of 150–1,700 m (490–5,580 ft) above sea level. It is separated from the Oban division to the south by about 50 km of disturbed rainforest. It lies south-west of the Obudu Plateau and immediately to the east of the Afi River Forest Reserve, separated from this reserve by the Mbe Mountains Community Forest.

The Takamanda Forest Reserve in the Republic of Cameroon shares a border with the Okwangwo division to the east. In November 2008 Takamanda was upgraded to a National Park through a joint project with the Wildlife Conservation Society and the government of Cameroon, with protection of the endangered Cross River gorilla a major objective. The 676 km^{2} Takamanda National Park will also help conserve forest elephants, chimpanzees, and drills.

The ground is rugged, with rocky ridges and outcrops. The highest points are in the Sankwala Mountains in the north (1,700 m) and in the Mbe Mountains in the south-west (1,000 m). Annual rainfall may be as much as 4,280 mm, mostly falling in the wet season between March and November. The division is drained by the Oyi, Bemi and Okon rivers, tributaries of the Cross River. The high ridge-tops are covered in montane grasslands, with relict forests in the valleys. Lower down, the division is covered by lowland rainforests, with areas of savanna where humans have destroyed the forests. The soils in the highland and lowland areas are vulnerable to erosion and leaching when stripped of their plant cover.

=== Biodiversity ===
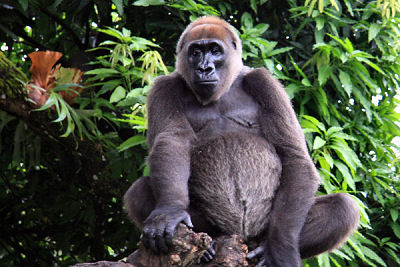
Cross River gorilla

The Okwangwo Division has richly diverse flora, with about 1,545 species representing 98 plant families recorded. Some of these species are endemic to the area. Others were unknown until recently. Over 280 species of birds have been recorded, including the vulnerable grey-necked rockfowl, which breeds in the Mbe mountains and the golden greenbul, rare in Nigeria. The grey parrot is near threatened.

The park is home to about 78% of the primate species that are found in Nigeria, including the vulnerable common chimpanzee and western gorilla, and the endangered Sclater's guenon, Preuss's monkey and drill, which coexist in the same areas of the park. Other large mammals include the endangered African forest elephant and more common African buffalo. The division may contain 200 chimpanzees, although no survey has been undertaken.

The gorilla habitat consists of semi-deciduous, montane and derived savannah environments in a complex of hilly escarpments with steep valleys, with peaks that rise as high as 2,000 m (6,600 ft). The primary base for gorillas is Mbe mountain, with a population of 30-40 individuals, not yet incorporated in the park. In 2003 it was thought that the Boshi Extension Forest in the north of the division and the Okwa and Ononyi Hills in the south were together home to 50-60 individuals, generally living in isolated subpopulations and therefore at risk of genetic inbreeding. The gorillas are also vulnerable to hunting, but generally the Boki people of the region prefer smaller game. However, during the period 1990-1998, perhaps two gorillas were killed by hunters each year.

=== Concerns ===
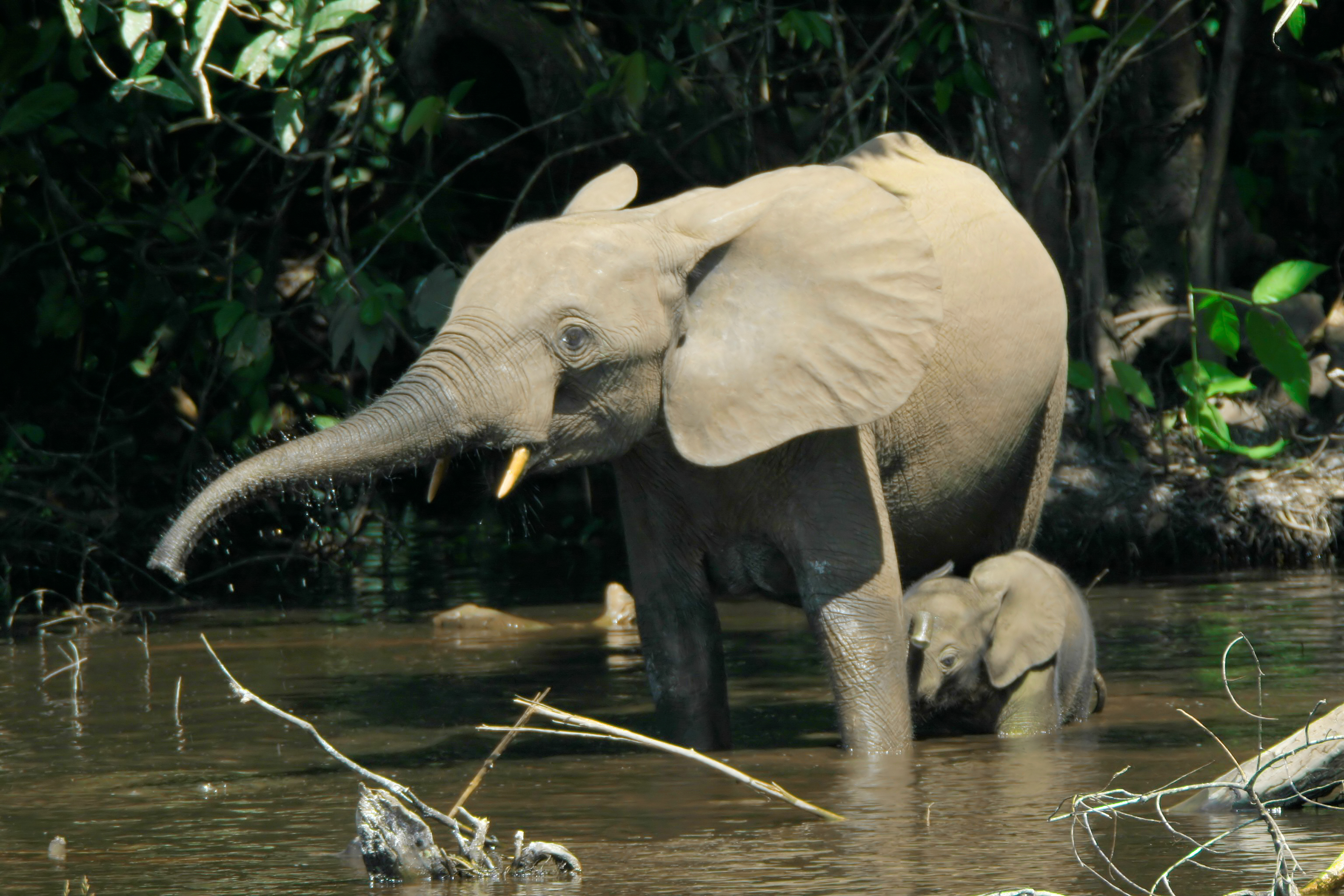
African forest elephant

There are about 66 villages in the buffer zone surrounding the park, with the villagers dependent on the park for their livelihoods. With a growing human population, the forest is being lost to slash-and-burn agriculture and illegal logging. Some fishermen are using chemicals (gamalin 20, a herbicide) to kill the fish. It is thought that three species of primate have been extirpated. Logging, both legal and illegal, in the buffer zone and the park itself have caused loss of habitat, and logging trails have opened up the forest to poachers. Snares set to trap smaller animals cause injuries to the larger species. Fulani herdsmen have encroached into the reserve to graze their cattle along the Bushi-Ranch axis. There is continued trans-border poaching of elephants between Nigeria and Cameroon. The main targets for illegal logging are Carpolobia, Garcinia and ebony, woods that are scarce outside the park. The police have made efforts to discourage these activities, but are handicapped by lack of funding.

Land ownership in the region rests with the native authority, which must obtain community consent for land transfers. The local people, with reason, are suspicious of government promises that they will receive long-term economic assistance in exchange for giving up their land, and instead demand exorbitant cash payment. This has frustrated efforts to incorporate the Afi River Forest Reserve and the Mbe Mountains Community Forest into the park, preventing more effective conservation efforts.

Programs to establish backyard farming of bushmeat species have been successful in other parts of the state, with villagers raising rabbits, poultry, duikers, porcupines, cane rats, giant rats, pythons, crocodiles and snails. In these areas, hunting and poaching of wild bushmeat has declined dramatically. The approach holds promise for the area surrounding the park. Other ways to protect the endangered species include creating corridors or eco-ducts, highway diversion and improved policing. All would be expensive and depend on committed government officials at the state and federal levels.

== Tourism potential ==
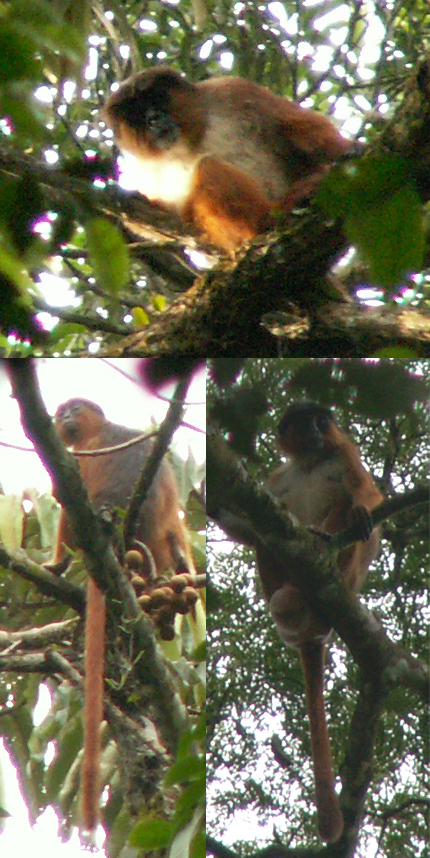
Preuss's red colobus in the adjacent Korup National Park. A critically endangered species, they are often found near the main tourist camps.

The federal government is courting investors to develop the eco-tourism potential in this and other national parks. The park has been given the motto "The Pride Of Nigeria". The Kanyang tourist village, about one hour's drive from Calabar, will give visitors a base from which to view the park, with a lodge, restaurant and wildlife museum. Activities include game viewing, bird watching, gorilla tracking, mountaineering or hiking, sport fishing, boat cruising and the Botanical garden and Herbarium in Butatong.

Attractions include the Kwa Falls, in a narrow, steep gorge near the headwaters of the Kwa River. The deep plunge pool at the foot of the waterfall was hidden under the thick canopy of the tropical rainforest before deforestation. The Agbokim falls on the Cross River descend in about 7 plunges over a cliff in the tropical rainforest. There is a mini zoological garden housing species of animals rarely found in Nigeria, which has helped save some rare species from extinction.
