= Bamba, Cross River State =

Coordinates: 6°16′50″N 9°07′32″E

Bamba
- Town
- Location within Nigeria
- Time zone: UTC+1
- UTC+1

Bamba is a village located in Boki Local Government Area of Cross River State, Nigeria. It is approximately 315 kilometres (196 mi) from Cross River's capital, Calabar, and approximately 605 kilometres (376 mi) from Abuja, the capital of Nigeria.

Important landmark in Bamba: Seekers Place.

== Climate ==
In Bamba, the wet season is cloudy, the dry season is generally bright, and the temperature is moderate all year long. The average annual temperature fluctuates between 64 °F and 92 °F, falling below 58 °F during wet season and in dry season rising slightly over 96 °F.
