= Ukpe-Bayobiri language =

Bendi language of Nigeria

Ukpe-Bayobiri
- Native to: Nigeria
- Region: Cross River State
- Native speakers: 21,500 (2013)
- Language family: Niger–Congo?: Atlantic–Congo; Benue–Congo; Southern Bantoid?; Bendi; Ukpe-Bayobiri
- Dialects: Ukpe; Bayobiri

Language codes
- ISO 639-3: ukp
- Glottolog: ukpe1247

Ukpe and Bayobiri form a Nigerian dialect cluster of the Bendi branch of the Benue–Congo languages.
