= Alege language =

Bendi language of Nigeria

Alege
- Surname
- Native to: Nigeria
- Region: Cross River State, Kogi State, Kwara State, Jos and Edo State
- Native speakers: 16,000 (2013)
- Language family: Niger–Congo?: Atlantic–Congo; Benue–Congo; Southern Bantoid?; Bendi; Alege

Language codes
- ISO 639-3: alf
- Glottolog: aleg1238

Alege is a Bendi language of Nigeria.
