= Bette people =

The Bette are a Bantu people inhabiting the Obudu area of Cross River State, Nigeria.

The Bette people are one of five tribes inhabiting Obudu area of Cross River State, along with the Utugwang, Alege, Ukpe and Ubang.

The name "Bette" refers to both the language and the people who constitute a dominant ethnic group in Obudu Local Government Area of Cross River State, Nigeria. Bette migrated from the Bantu in south Central Africa and settled at the foot of the Cameroun Mountain, a part of which now constitutes the famous Obudu Cattle Ranch. Bette is a folk language that is still grossly unwritten because of the dearth of a standard orthography. However, Bette is a complex language deeply tied to the culture and existence of its people and cannot be easily understood or analyzed academically by merely comparing to European languages or other unrelated languages.
