= Obudu Dam =

- Interactive map of Obudu Dam
- Location: Cross River State, Nigeria
- Coordinates: 06°36′52″N 09°10′15″E
- Opening date: 1999

Dam and spillways
- Impounds: Abeb River
- Height: 15 m (49 ft)
- Length: 425 m (1,394 ft)

Reservoir
- Total capacity: 4.2 million m^{3}

The Obudu Dam is in Obudu local government area of Cross River State in the south east of Nigeria. It is an earth-fill structure with a height of 15 m (16 yd; 49 ft) and a total crest length of 425 m (1,394 ft; 465 yd), and has a capacity of 4.2 million m^{3}. The dam is located within the Obudu crystalline basement plateau, a low-lying undulating region of low seismic activity. The dam was commissioned in 1999 for use in farm irrigation, fishing, and also for recreational and tourism purposes. In September 2000, the traditional ruler of Obudu local government area, Uti Agba, promised that his community would protect the facilities installed at the dam.

A massive rainstorm in July 2003, combined with release of excess water from the Lagdo Dam in Cameroon, damaged the spillway and caused flooding that destroyed over 200 houses. The estimated cost of repairing the damage and also completing the irrigation works was estimated at N350 million. A 2004 safety review reported that immediate work was required to restore the spillway, at an estimated cost of N272 million. In July 2009, the Federal government issued a tender for engineering supervision of remedial work on the dam including refurbishing or replacing hydro-mechanical parts, electrical installation and civil engineering infrastructure. The dam has reduced downstream water volumes in Obudu town, causing acute scarcity of drinking water in the dry season.
