= Bekwarra language =

Bendi language of Nigeria

Bekwarra
- Ebekwara
- Native to: Nigeria
- Region: Cross River State
- Native speakers: (100,000 cited 1989)
- Language family: Niger–Congo?: Atlantic–Congo; Benue–Congo; Southern Bantoid?; Bendi; Bekwarra

Language codes
- ISO 639-3: bkv
- Glottolog: bekw1241

Bekwarra, also known as Bekworra, is a Bendi language of Nigeria. It is spoken by the Bekwarra people of Eastern Nigeria. Neighboring tribal groups such as the Nki and Iyala refer to the language and group as Yakoro.

== Phonology ==
Bekwarra consonants
		Labio-velar	Labial	Alveolar	Palatal	Velar	Glottal
Plosive	Voiceless	kp	p	t		k	
Plosive	Voiced	gb	b	d		g	
Affricate	Voiceless				t͡ʃ		
Affricate	Voiced				d͡ʒ		
Nasal		^{ŋ}m	m	n	ɲ	ŋ	
Fricative		ɸ ~ f		s ~ ʃ			h
Lateral				l			
Trill				r			
Semivowel		w			y		

Bekwarra vowels
	Front	Central	Back
Close	i		u
Mid	e		o
Open		a	
