= Okomu National Park =

National park in Edo State, Nigeria

- IUCN category II (national park)
- Location within Nigeria
- Location: Ovia South-West, Edo State, Nigeria
- Nearest city: Udo
- Coordinates: 6°20′0″N 5°16′0″E
- Area: 181 km^{2} (70 sq mi)
- Established: 1935

The Okomu National Park, formerly the Okomu Wildlife Sanctuary, has been identified as one of the largest remaining natural rainforest ecosystems. Due to the high biodiversity seen in the Okomu National Park, a Wildlife Sanctuary was first established there.

It is a forest block within the 1,082 km^{2} (418 sq mi) Okomu Forest Reserve in the Ovia South-West Local Government Area of Edo State in Nigeria and is located between latitudes 6° 15ʹ and 6° 25ʹ North and longitude 5° 9ʹ and 5° 23ʹ East. The park is about 60 km (37 mi) northwest of Benin City. The park holds a small fragment of the rich forest that once covered the region, and is the last habitat for many endangered species. It is the smallest of Nigeria's seven national parks, with a total land size of about 200 km2 and continues to shrink as villages encroach on it, and is now less than one-third of its original size. Powerful corporations are involved in plantation development and logging concessions around the park, which also pose a threat.

== History ==
The park holds a remnant of the Nigerian lowland forests that once formed a continuous 50–100 km (31–62 mi) wide belt from the Niger River west to the Dahomey Gap in Benin. To the south and southeast the forest was separated from the coast by mangrove and swamp forests, while to the north it merged into the Guinean Forest-Savanna Mosaic ecoregion. Human pressure is not new. In the Okomu park there is an extensive layer of charcoal and pottery below the forest, indicating that it was cleared and then regenerated over the last 700 years. By the start of the 20th century the forest survived only in disconnected blocks, which were under intense pressure from human activity.

The 200 km^{2} (77 sq mi) wildlife sanctuary, a rainforest ecosystems that is the habitat for many endangered species of flora and fauna, was gazetted from the Okomu Forest Reserve in 1935. A survey of southwestern forests in Nigeria in 1982 led to a recommendation for a determined effort to conserve the sanctuary. The state government formally defined the sanctuary in 1986, with an area of just 66 km^{2}. The Nigerian Conservation Foundation (NCF) took over management of the sanctuary in 1987, and extended it to 114 km^{2} (44 sq mi) by adding a 1.6-kilometre-wide (1 mi) buffer zone.

The NCF was diverted into assisting migrant farmers in the surrounding areas, in an attempt to help the villagers find alternative means of living without encroaching on the forest. The NCF agricultural initiatives had the perverse effect of attracting immigrants from poorer areas, and thus increasing the pressure from illegal hunting and logging. In 1997 it was also found that several NCF employees had been involved in illegal logging within the sanctuary. In May 1999 the sanctuary was taken over by the National Park Service.

== Environment ==
The park is drained by the Osse River which defines its eastern boundary. The Okomu River forms the western boundary. Rainfall is between 1,524 and 2,540 mm per year. Soils are acidic, nutrient-poor sandy loam. Vegetation is Guinea–Congo lowland rain forest, including areas of swamp-forest, high forest, secondary forest, and open scrub. Among the common trees are Kapok, Celtis zenkeri, Triplochiton scleroxylon, Antiaris africana, Pycnanthus angolensis and Alstonia congensis. The park is probably the best example of mature secondary forest in southwest Nigeria.

The park is accessible to tourists, and has well-marked trails. There are two tree houses, one 43 metres (140 ft) high in a silk-cotton tree, from which visitors can view the park from above and observe bird life. Visitors can stay at chalets built on stilts, just outside the park entrance, surrounded by fig trees that are often occupied by Mona monkeys. Guides are available for forest walks, and will point out such things as termite nests and the many medicinal plants.

== Fauna ==
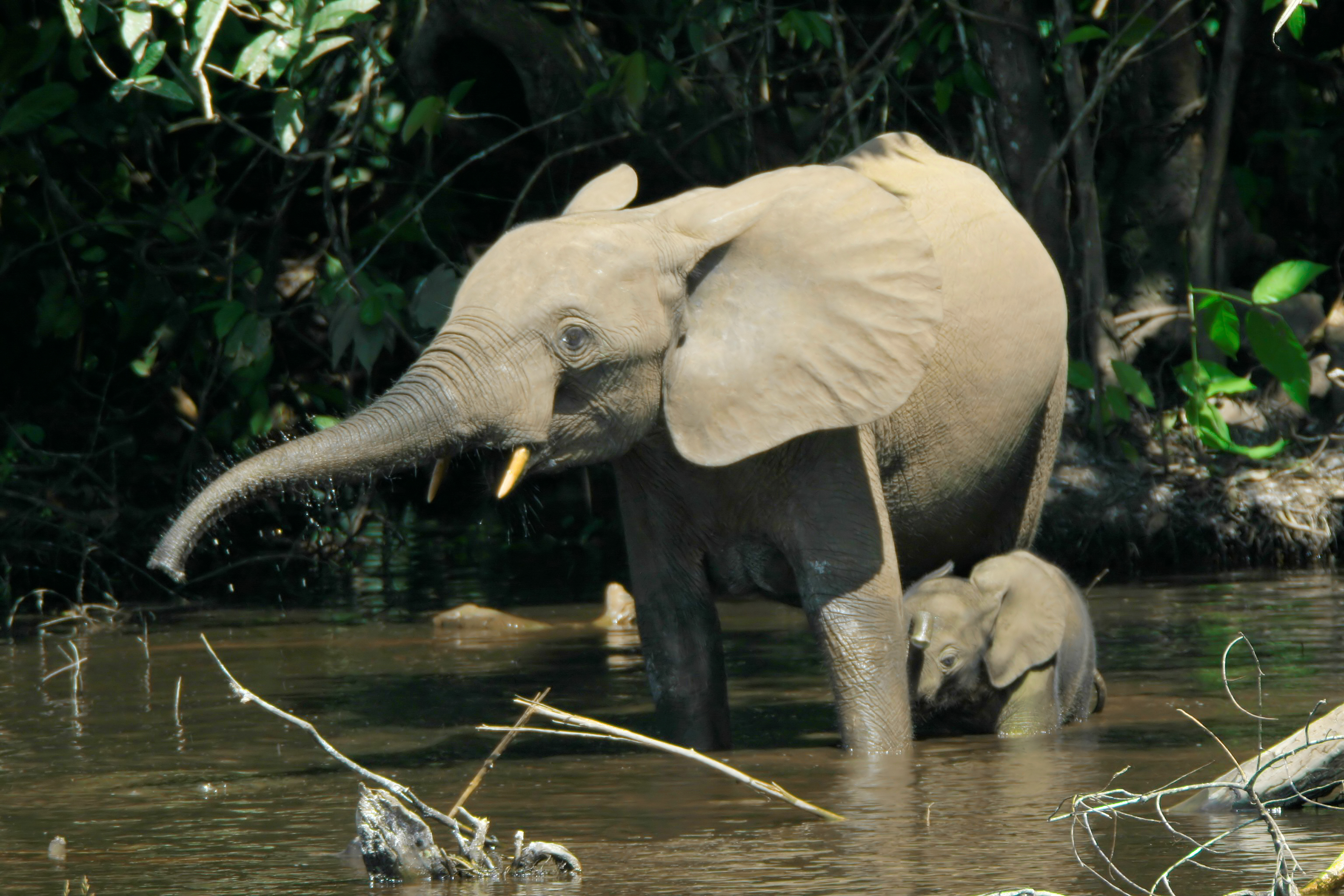
African forest elephant

The park has diverse fauna, with 33 species of mammals including the African buffalo and the endangered African forest elephant. Elephant sightings are rare, although in 2007 a one-year-old elephant carcass was found, unlikely to have died from natural causes. Park officials claim that elephant poaching no longer occurs, despite the high prices commanded for ivory in Lagos.

There is a population of the vulnerable white-throated guenon, a primate. Although no thorough study of the primate population has been done since 1982, chimpanzees were reported to be present in the region in 2009. The number of chimpanzees estimated to live in the Okomu Forest Reserve was guessed to be 25–50 in 2003, and some may use the national park at times. Other animals found in the park include dwarf crocodiles, red river hog, sitatunga, warthog, civet cat, Maxwell's duiker, grass cutter, mona monkey, Thomas's galago and tree pangolin and the red-capped mangabey.

About 150 species of birds have been identified. These include Angolan pitta, grey parrot, wrinkled hornbill, fish eagle, hawks, woodpeckers, great owl, grey hornbill, cattle egret, black-casqued hornbill, yellow-casqued hornbill, Sabine's spinetail, Cassin's spinetail, black spinetail, white-breasted nigrita, chestnut-breasted nigrita, pale-fronted nigrita and yellow-throated cuckoo.

Terrestrial molluscs seem exceptionally vulnerable to extinction, and low diversity may indicate subtle environmental problems. A survey of land molluscs in a small area of the forest found 46 species in 11 molluscan families, of which Streptaxidae snails accounted for over a third. This is much lower diversity than has been found in Cameroon and Sabah. However, it may be due to the very limited sample in just one area. Perhaps of greater interest to most visitors, the park has over 700 species of colourful butterflies.

== Threats ==
Visitors must follow strict regulations to avoid degrading the environment. However, the park is threatened by large-scale illegal logging, the expansion of large rubber and oil-palm plantations nearby, and incursions by a growing human population involved in farming and hunting. In 2009, the executive director of LifeTag, a non-governmental organisation (NGO) based in Lagos, called for urgent action by the Edo State government to prevent further illegal encroachment and destructive logging activities in the park, which both threaten the rare species and will destroy the long-term revenue to be earned from eco-tourism. The Federal government has said that it is eager to partner with foreign investors to develop eco-tourism in Okomu and other National Parks.

In October 2010, representatives of the park's management met with leaders from the seven major communities bordering the park and established a Local Advisory Committee. The conservator of the park, Mohammed Yakubu Kolo, said the committee was to "provide a platform for the park management and the local communities to work together on issues of mutual interest, in order to achieve the park's set-goals". He went on to say "The establishment of LAC for Okomu Park is the most significant move ever made to guarantee the continuous protection of its diverse rich biological resources and splendour". A forestry officer said the move would help the communities work together to stop poaching.

The protected area of the Okomu National Forest is too small and too vulnerable. Without further efforts to improve protection, it is unlikely that the forest will remain viable long into the future.
