= Okomu Forest Reserve =

Forest reserve in Benin City, Nigeria

- IUCN category II (national park)
- Location within Nigeria
- Coordinates: 6°25′0″N 5°28′0″E
- Area: 1,081 km^{2} (417 sq mi)

The Okomu Forest Reserve is a forest block covering an area of 1081 km^{2} in Edo State, about 50 km west of Benin City, Nigeria. The Okomu National Park lies within the larger reserve, maintaining a small part of the forest covering about 200 km^{2} and it once covered the region as the last habitat for many endangered species.

== History ==
The Okomu Forest Reserve was originally established by the British colonial government in 1912. In 1935, additional 411 km^{2} (159 sq mi) were added to the north and east, bringing the total area to 777 km^{2} (300 sq mi). The reserve was intended to be managed as a source of lumber from the start, and its abundant mahogany stands have been exploited. The reserve has been actively engaged in systematic rotational logging and "taungya" farming since the 1940s. A section of forest is assigned to local farmers for cultivation, then reforested with valuable tree species in this forest management scheme.

By 1984, a very large portion of the reserve had already been lost to oil palm and rubber plantations.

- Some of this conversion was officially sanctioned (part of government-backed plantation projects).
- But a lot also happened illegally or without any oversight, leading to uncontrolled deforestation.
- This period marked one of the heaviest pressures on the reserve, as commercial agriculture expanded aggressively in Edo State.

== Climate ==
The reserve enjoys a tropical monsoon climate (Köppen–Geiger classification Am), characterized by consistently warm and humid weather throughout the year.

The annual average temperature stands at 25.7 °C (78.3 °F), with a narrow variation ranging from 24.1 °C (75.4 °F) in August to 27.5 °C (81.4 °F) in February — a difference of 3.3 °C.

Rainfall is abundant, averaging 2100 mm annually. The wettest month is September at 304 mm, while December is the driest with just 31 mm — a difference of 273 mm.

Relative humidity remains high year-round, peaking at 90.9% in June and dipping to around 67.3% in January.

Sunlight varies seasonally: January delivers the most, averaging 7.46 hours/day or 231 hours/month.

Rainy days also differ: July averages 21 rainy days, whereas December sees only 7.

Climate data for Okomu Forest Reserve (Okabeghe)
Month	Jan	Feb	Mar	Apr	May	Jun	Jul	Aug	Sep	Oct	Nov	Dec	Year
Mean daily maximum °C (°F)	33 (92)	32.9 (91.3)	31.8 (89.2)	30.6 (87.1)	29.7 (85.5)	28 (83)	27.5 (81.5)	27.5 (81.5)	28.0 (82.4)	29.0 (84.2)	30.3 (86.5)	32.2 (89.9)	30.0 (86.2)
Daily mean °C (°F)	27.2 (80.9)	27.4 (81.4)	27.1 (80.7)	26.4 (79.6)	25.8 (78.4)	24.7 (76.5)	24.2 (75.5)	24.1 (75.4)	24.3 (75.8)	24.9 (76.9)	25.8 (78.5)	27 (80)	25.7 (78.3)
Mean daily minimum °C (°F)	23.0 (73.4)	24.1 (75.4)	24.5 (76.1)	24.1 (75.4)	23.6 (74.4)	22.8 (73.1)	22.3 (72.1)	22 (72)	22.4 (72.3)	22.7 (72.8)	23.2 (73.8)	23.0 (73.4)	23.1 (73.7)
Average precipitation cm (inches)	2.5 (1)	5.1 (2)	13 (5)	20 (8)	25 (10)	28 (11)	28 (11)	25 (10)	28 (11)	23 (9)	7.6 (3)	2.5 (1)	207.7 (82)
Average rainy days	7	11	17	19	21	21	21	21	21	21	13	7	200
Average relative humidity (%)	67	76	83	88	90	91	90	89	91	90	87	76	85
Mean daily sunshine hours	7.5	6.8	6.2	5.8	5.4	4.4	4.1	3.8	4.1	4.9	5.4	7.1	5.5
Source: climate-data.org

== Conservation ==
The reserve is one of Nigeria's most important conservation areas. Within the reserve, the park was established to protect forest elephants and threatened primate species.

Efforts are carried out through a combination of strategies and initiatives:

1. Protected area status: The most fundamental aspects of conservation at the Okomu Forest Reserve is its status as a protected area. This designation offers legal protection against activities like illegal logging, poaching, and habitat destruction. The Nigerian government, along with local and international organizations, works to enforce these protections.
2. Habitat restoration: Part of the conservation efforts involves habitat restoration within the reserve. This includes reforestation and afforestation initiatives to rehabilitate areas that have been degraded due to logging or other human activities. Restoring the forest's structure and composition helps recreate critical habitat for various species.
3. Anti-poaching measures: Poaching is a significant threat to the wildlife in the reserve, particularly for species like the forest elephant and various primates. Conservation organizations and government agencies implement anti-poaching measures, including patrols, the establishment of ranger stations, and community-based monitoring to deter poachers and protect vulnerable species.
4. Community engagement: Involving local communities in conservation efforts is essential. Collaborative initiatives include community-based conservation programs that provide economic alternatives to unsustainable activities. These programs help reduce the reliance on forest resources and enhance the local population's awareness of conservation goals.
5. Research and monitoring: Ongoing research and monitoring of the reserve's biodiversity are crucial for understanding the ecosystem's health and identifying potential threats. This data informs conservation decisions and helps to adapt strategies to protect specific species and habitats.
6. Sustainable resource management: Sustainable resource management within the reserve is promoted to ensure that activities like logging and non-timber forest product collection do not harm the ecosystem's long-term health. Strict guidelines are put in place to minimize the environmental impact while still providing economic opportunities for the local communities.
7. Environmental education and awareness: Conservation organizations and government agencies conduct environmental education programs for both local communities and visitors. These programs aim to raise awareness about the importance of the reserve and promote responsible behavior within the forest.

== Environment and climate ==
The reserve is preserved as a vital ecological asset to mitigate climate change, promote a sustainable environment, and safeguard biodiversity. By protecting natural habitats, conserving flora and fauna, and encouraging afforestation through tree planting, the reserve plays a key role in ensuring environmental balance and resilience.

== Importance ==
The reserve is a significant natural resource with profound economic, cultural, and social importance to both the local communities and the broader region.

=== Economic importance ===
1. Biodiversity and ecosystem services: The reserve is home to a rich and diverse array of plant and animal species. This biodiversity has several economic benefits, including ecotourism and pharmaceutical potential. Many endemic and endangered species exist here, making it a valuable source of genetic diversity.
2. Timber and non-timber forest products: The forest is a source of timber for the local timber industry, providing hardwoods like mahogany, teak, and ebony. Additionally, it yields various non-timber forest products such as bush mango, wild yams, and medicinal plants that contribute to local livelihoods and trade.
3. Rubber plantations: The Okomu Oil Palm Company, a subsidiary of the Belgian company SOCFIN, operates a rubber plantation within the reserve. Rubber production contributes significantly to the national and local economies.
4. Job opportunities: The various economic activities within and around the reserve, including ecotourism, logging, and rubber production, create employment opportunities for the local population, reducing unemployment and improving living standards.

=== Cultural importance ===
1. Traditional beliefs and practices: The forest holds immense cultural significance for the indigenous communities such as the Ijaw, Edo, and other ethnic groups. It is often regarded as a sacred place, and many traditional beliefs and practices are closely tied to the forest. Cultural events, rituals, and ceremonies are often held in the forest, and the spiritual connection between the people and the forest is strong.
2. Medicinal and traditional knowledge: Indigenous communities rely on the forest for traditional medicine, food, and building materials. The knowledge of the forest's resources and their uses has been passed down through generations and forms an integral part of the local culture.
3. Cultural identity: The forest also plays a role in preserving the cultural identity of the local communities. The traditions and customs associated with the forest help maintain a sense of identity and continuity among the indigenous people.

=== Social importance ===
1. Livelihoods: Many local communities depend on the reserve for their livelihoods. This includes hunting, fishing, farming, and the collection of non-timber forest products. The economic activities derived from the forest contribute to poverty reduction and community development.
2. Sustainable resource management: The forest reserve is managed sustainably, ensuring that resources are not over-exploited and that the communities can continue to benefit from them in the long term. This sustainable management helps maintain the ecological balance of the region.
3. Tourism and Education: The reserve attracts tourists and researchers interested in its biodiversity. The revenue generated from ecotourism activities helps improve local infrastructure and provides funds for conservation efforts. Additionally, it serves as an educational resource for schools and universities, creating awareness about the importance of preserving natural ecosystems.
