= Bumaji language =

Bendi language of Nigeria

Bumaji
- Native to: Nigeria
- Region: Cross River State
- Native speakers: (11,000 cited 2000)
- Language family: Niger–Congo?: Atlantic–Congo; Benue–Congo; Southern Bantoid?; Bendi; Bumaji

Language codes
- ISO 639-3: byp
- Glottolog: buma1244

Bumaji is a Bendi language of Nigeria.
