= Egbema people =

Igbo people of Imo and Rivers States, Nigeria

Ndi Egbema

Total population
- 167,438 (2008 estimate)

Regions with significant populations
- Imo State and Rivers State, Nigeria

Languages
- Egbema (Igboid), Igbo, English

Religion
- Christianity, Odinani

Related ethnic groups
- Igbo people, Ogba people, Ekpeye people, Ikwerre people

The Egbema people (Igbo: Ndi Egbema) are Igbo group found primarily in Imo State and Rivers State. The language spoken here is a mutually intelligible Igboid language belonging to the Niger-Congo language family, with a population estimate of 167,438 as of 2008.

== See also ==
- Igbo people
- Ogba people
- Ekpeye people
- Ikwerre people
- Ohaji/Egbema Local Government Area
- Ogba/Egbema/Ndoni Local Government Area
- Imo State
- Rivers State
- Egbema tribe
