= Bendi languages =

Language family

Bendi
- Geographic distribution: Cross River State in southeastern Nigeria, and southwestern Cameroon
- Linguistic classification: Niger–Congo?: Atlantic–Congo; Volta-Congo; Benue–Congo; Bantoid; Southern Bantoid; Bendi

Language codes
- Glottolog: bend1256
- The Bendi languages shown within Nigeria and Cameroon: Bekwarra Putukwam Alege Ukpe-Bayobiri Ubang Bete-Bendi Obanliku Bumaji Bokyi

The Bendi languages are a small group of languages spoken in Cross River State, southeastern Nigeria. Bokyi is one of the Bendi languages having some speakers in Cameroon. Once counted among the Cross River languages, they may be a branch of Southern Bantoid, with observed similarities especially with the Ekoid languages.

Very little research has been conducted on the Bendi languages, and the modern work that does exist often remains either unpublished or inaccessible. The group is notable for having one language (Ubang) that has male and female forms.

== Languages ==
The Obudu-Obanlikwu-Eastern Boki languages are:

Alege, Obanliku, Bekwarra, Bete-Bendi, Bokyi, Bumaji, Utugwang, Ubang, Ukpe-Bayobiri.

The data is too poorly covered to allow for detailed internal classification of these languages.

== Names and locations ==
Below is a list of language names, populations, and locations from Blench (2019).

Language	Cluster	Dialects	Alternate spellings	Own name for language	Other names (location-based)	Other names for language	Exonym(s)	Speakers	Location(s)
Bekwarra			Bekwara, Bekworra			Yakoro		27,500 (1953), 34,000 (1963), 60,000 (1985 SIL)	Cross River State, Ogoja LGA
Obanliku		Basang (Bàsáu), Bebi, Bishiri, Bisu (Gayi), Busi	Abanliku					19,800 (1963); estimated 65,000 (Faraclas 1989)	Cross River State, Obudu LGA
Obe cluster	Obe				Mbube Eastern (a geographical name); Ogberia	Mbe Afal (by the Mbe)		16,341 (1963)	Cross River State, Obudu LGA. 6 villages: Nkim, Ogboria Ogang, Ogboria Uchuruo, Ojerim (Ojirim), Árágbán, and Òbósó.
Mgbenege	Obe								Cross River State, Obudu LGA
Utugwang	Obe		Otugwang						Cross River State, Obudu LGA
Okwọrọgung	Obe		Okorogung						Cross River State, Obudu LGA
Ukwortung	Obe		Okorotung, Okwọrọtung						Cross River State, Obudu LGA
Ubang				Ùbâŋ					Cross River State, Obudu LGA
Ukpe–Bayobiri cluster	Ukpe–Bayobiri							12,000 (1973 SIL)	Cross River State, Obudu and Ikom LGAs
Ukpe	Ukpe–Bayobiri								
Bayobiri	Ukpe–Bayobiri								
Alege									Cross River State, Obudu LGA
Bete–Bendi		Bete, Bendi	Bette–Bendi			Dama		17,250 (1952), 36,800 (1963)	Cross River State, Obudu LGA
Bumaji		Bumaji	umuji	Bumaji					Cross River State, Obudu LGA
Afrike-Irungene cluster	Afrike-Irungene								Cross River State, Ogoja LGA
Afrike	Afrike-Irungene		Aferikpe					3,500 (1953)	Cross River State, Ogoja LGA
Irungene	Afrike-Irungene								Cross River State, Ogoja LGA
Bokyi		By clans: Abo, Bashua, Boje, East Boki, Irruan, Osokum, Basua/Ɓashua, Wula: Báswó, Okúndi, Kecwan	Boki			Nki, Okii, Uki	Nfua	43,000 (1963); 50,000 in Nigeria (1987 UBS), 3,700 in Cameroon (SIL)	Cross River State, Ikom, Ogoja and Obudu LGAs; and in Cameroon

== Numerals ==
Comparison of numerals in individual languages:

Language	1	2	3	4	5	6	7	8	9	10
Bekwarra	kìn	-hà	-cià	-nè	-dyaŋ	-dyaàkìn (5 + 1)	-dièhà (5 + 2)	-diècià (5 + 3)	-diènè (5 + 4)	irifo
Bete-Bendi (Bə̀ttə́) (1)	ìkèn	ìfè	ìkíé	ìnè	ìdíɔ́ŋ	ìdíɔ́ŋ ìkèn (5 + 1)	ìdíɔ́ŋ ìfè (5 + 2)	ìdíɔ́ŋ ìkíé (5 + 3)	ìdíɔ́ŋ ìnè (5 + 4)	lèhʷó
Bete-Bendi (Bette) (2)	iken	ifee	ikʲe	inde	idʲoŋ	idʲoŋ-iken (5 + 1)	idʲoŋ-ifee (5 + 2)	idʲoŋ-ikʲe (5 + 3)	idʲoŋ-inde (5 + 4)	lihʷo
Bokyi	kìbɒ́ŋɛ̀	bìfɛ̀ː	bìt͡ʃât	bìɲìː	bìtáŋɛ̀	ɲât͡ʃât (lit: "add three")	kát͡ʃákáɲì (lit: 3 plus 4)	ɲíríɲì (lit: 4 plus 4)	kátáŋɛ̀káɲì (lit: 5 plus 4)	děːk͡púː

== See also ==
- Bendi word lists (Wiktionary)
