= Obudu =

- Town and local government area
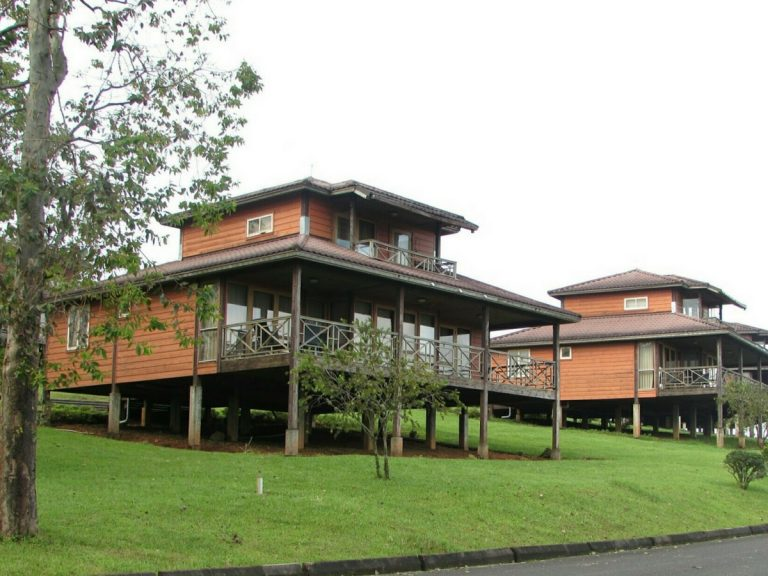
- Obudu Mountain Resort lodges
- Interactive map of Obudu
- Location in Nigeria
- Coordinates: 6°40′0″N 9°10′0″E
- Country: Nigeria
- State: Cross River State

Government
  - Local Government Chairman: Boniface Ewhe Eraye
- Time zone: UTC+1 (WAT)
- Website: www.crossriverhub.com.ng/obudu

Obudu is a local government area and town in Cross River State, Nigeria. The area features a tourist resort, Obudu Mountain Resort, which hosts an annual mountain running competition called the Obudu Ranch International Mountain Race. The town of Obudu is downstream from the Obudu Dam, which has caused acute scarcity of drinking water in the dry season. The town is approximately 17 kilometres (11 miles) away from Bebi Airport and is a 6-hour drive from Calabar, the capital of Cross River.

== Geography ==
The Obudu Local Government Area is bordered to the north by Vandeikya of Benue State, to the east by the community of Akwaya in the Republic of Cameroon (prior to the time when Obanlikwu was still together), and to the south and west by the Local Government Areas of Boki and Bekwarra. The local government headquarters is located in Bette clan, with the Bette-Bendi occupying the central position, and the Ukpe-Alege occupying the southern reach of the geo-cultural spread. The Obanlikwu, Utanga-Becheve, and Utugwang now form an independent Obanlikwu Local Government Area.

== Climate ==
In Obudu, the dry season is typically hot, humid, and partly cloudy, whereas the wet season is generally warm, muggy, and mostly overcast. Throughout the year, temperatures usually range from 18 °C (65 °F) to 32 °C (89 °F), seldom dropping below 16 °C (60 °F) or exceeding 34 °C (93 °F).

Obudu has a tropical savanna climate (Aw). Throughout the year, temperatures generally fall between 25 °C (77 °F) and 29 °C (85 °F), though they can occasionally drop to around 16 °C (62 °F) or climb to about 39 °C (103 °F). The area receives roughly 1,385 mm (54.5 inches) of rainfall annually, spread across about 186 days with at least 1 mm (0.04 inches) of rain. Obudu also enjoys around 3,435 hours of sunshine each year, with daily daylight lasting between 11 hours 43 minutes (December) and 12 hours 29 minutes (June).

== History ==
=== Early history in Africa ===
The Obudu geo-cultural area is home to six clans: Bette, Obanlikwu, Bendi, Utuwang, Ukpe-Alege, and Utanga-Becheve, all of which thrived as independent villages with a strong culture of kinship. The origins of the Obudu people are unknown, although it is likely they migrated from somewhere to the east and reached the location they inhabited by the 18th century. The most popular tradition of migration, the Ulanga Legend, points to Ulanga, a mountain peak in the present-day village of Amandakureke, in Utanga-Becheve clan as a secondary, or perhaps, tertiary dispersal center. There is a relative consensus in traditions across families that they were displaced at Ulanga by the invasion of a group referred to as Igenyi. This was described as light-skinned people with soft bunching hair, clad in long-flowing gowns, armed with spears, mounted on horses, and with a large following of black servants. Extant literature suggests that these could have been Fulani, the Chamba, or Portuguese slave raiders, all three of whose imperialist expeditions in sub-Sahara are recorded to have peaked in the 18th and early 19th century.

Another narrative suggests that progenitors of Obudu arrived at a place remembered as Onikal in the Cameroon country, before proceeding to Ulanga, from where the Igenyi dispersed them. Traditional accounts of the Bendi clan report they stayed briefly at Ukwel Unokel (translated as Mountain Unokel), before proceeding to Ulanga, the point of dispersal. It is likely that both Onikal and Ukwel Unokel allude to the same location. Other recollections suggest a shared origin between them, and their Bekwarra neighbors, whom they regard as historical "brothers". This possibility is reinforced by several cultural commonalities, including mutually intelligible dialects. In the light of the foregoing, if as believed, the Bekwarra had a powerful connection with the ancient Kwararaffa Empire, it is probable that the displacement referred to in Obudu traditions of migration correlates with the disintegration of Kwararaffa in the 18th century and spreading of its population.

What appears to be a disparity in these recollections could be easily reconciled to derive plausible primary and secondary points of dispersal. At any rate, the mild variation in mutually intelligible dialects of its clans suggests splinter group movement, separate migratory experiences, and marginal variance in time of arrival. What, however, seems incontrovertible is that the Obudu clans had taken ownership of the area they inhabited by the 18th century, having emigrated from an easterly Bantu homeland.

=== Modern history ===
With the advent of British colonialism, the six Obudu clans were formally integrated into the then Ogoja province of the Eastern Region of Nigeria. After Nigeria's independence in 1960 and the local government review commission in 1976, Obudu became an autonomous local government council. It has since remained one of the eighteen local government areas of Cross River State. Cross River recruited foreign qualified teachers for Model School, in Obudu Local Government Area.
