= Boki people =

The Boki people (Bokyi) (also known as Nki) are a tribe found in Cross River State, Nigeria. The Boki people are predominantly farmers who are also forest-dependent. They speak the Bokyi language, one of the Bendi languages. In 1979, the Bokyi population exceeded 190,000.
