= Ivan Bokyi =

Ukrainian journalist and politician (1942–2020)

- Іван Бокий
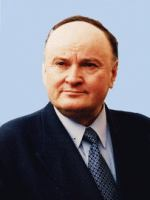
- Born: February 20, 1942; Pronozіvka, Ukrainian SSR
- Died: March 24, 2020 (aged 78); Kyiv, Ukraine
- Education: Taras Shevchenko National University of Kyiv
- Occupations: Journalist, politician, Deputy of the Verkhovna Rada (1998–2007)

Ivan Bokyi (Ukrainian: Іван Бокий; February 20, 1942 – March 24, 2020) was a Ukrainian journalist and politician, who served as a Deputy of the Verkhovna Rada between 1998 and 2007.

== Early life ==
Bokyi was born on 20 February 1942 in the village of Pronozivka (Poltava Oblast), which was then part of the Ukrainian SSR of the Soviet Union, but at the time of his birth was occupied by German forces during World War II. In 1968, he graduated from the Taras Shevchenko National University of Kyiv. After graduating, he working as a literary worker at Socialistychna Hradizhchyna from 1960 to 1962, a department head and deputy editor at Zoria Komunizmu from 1962 to 1974, an editor of Komsomolets Poltavshchyny from 1974 to 1982, an editor of Molod Ukrayiny from 1982 to 1984, and as deputy editor-in-chief of Silski Visti from 1987 to 1998.

During the 1998 Ukrainian parliamentary election, he was elected a People's Deputy of Ukraine to the Verkhovna Rada on the party list of the Socialist Party – Peasant Party. He later formally joined the Socialist Party of Ukraine, and represented the party in the parliament through 2007, and was First Deputy Chair of the Committee on European Integration and head of the Ukrainian delegation to the Parliamentary Assembly of the Black Sea Economic Cooperation. During his time as an MP, in the midst of the 2007 Ukrainian political crisis, he was a sharp critic of then President Viktor Yushchenko, who he stated was not doing his job, and his Prime Minister Yulia Tymoshenko who he accused of being in a middle ground between both Our Ukraine and the Party of Regions.

Bokyi died on 24 March 2020, aged 78.
