= Boki (surname) =

Boki, Bokii, Bokiy, Boky, or Bokyi (Cyrillic: Бокій / Бокий) is a surname. Notable people include:

- Aleksandr Bokiy (born 1957), Belarusian footballer
- Gleb Bokii (1879–1937), Soviet politician and Cheka officer
- Gleb Bokiy (born 1970), Soviet figure skater
- Ihar Boki (born 1994), Belarusian Paralympic swimmer
- Ivan Bokyi (1942–2020), Ukrainian journalist and politician
