= Mbe Mountains Community Forest =

Coordinates: 6°13′N 9°04′E

The Mbe Mountains Community Forest is situated in southern Nigeria, and covers 86 km^{2}.

Rising to heights of 900 m (980 yd; 3,000 ft) the Mbe Mountains are an important stronghold for the critically endangered Cross River gorilla Gorilla gorilla diehli, as well as a number of other unique species such as the Nigeria-Cameroon chimpanzee Pan troglodytes ellioti, the drill Mandrillus leucophaeus, and the grey-necked rockfowl Picathartes oreas. The Mbe Mountains are surrounded by nine communities with a total population of approximately 10,000 people.

== Gallery ==
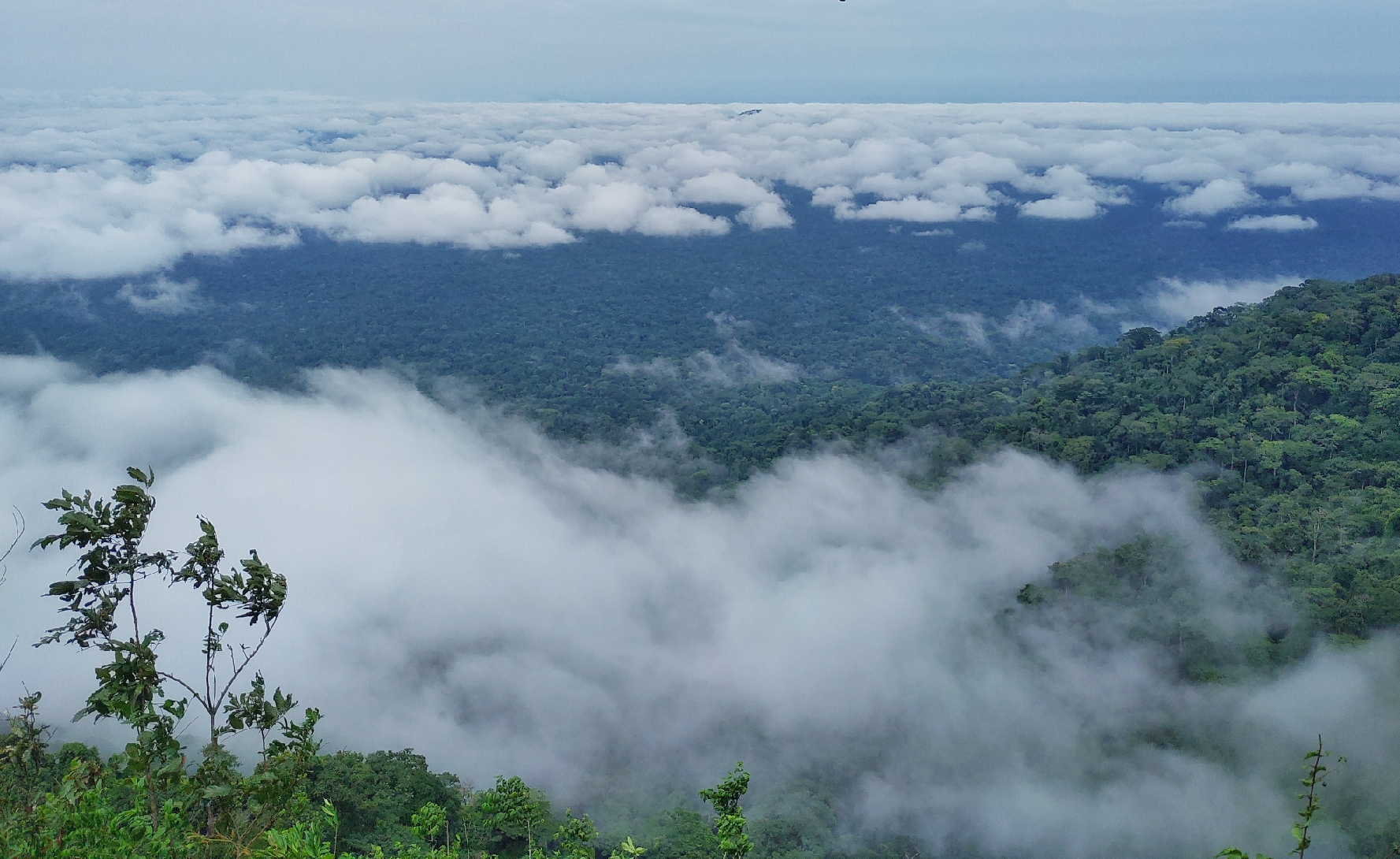
Spectacular from 'Gorilla rock' one of the highest points on the hill. Expanse of forest extends from Cross River to Takamanda forest reserve, Cameroon

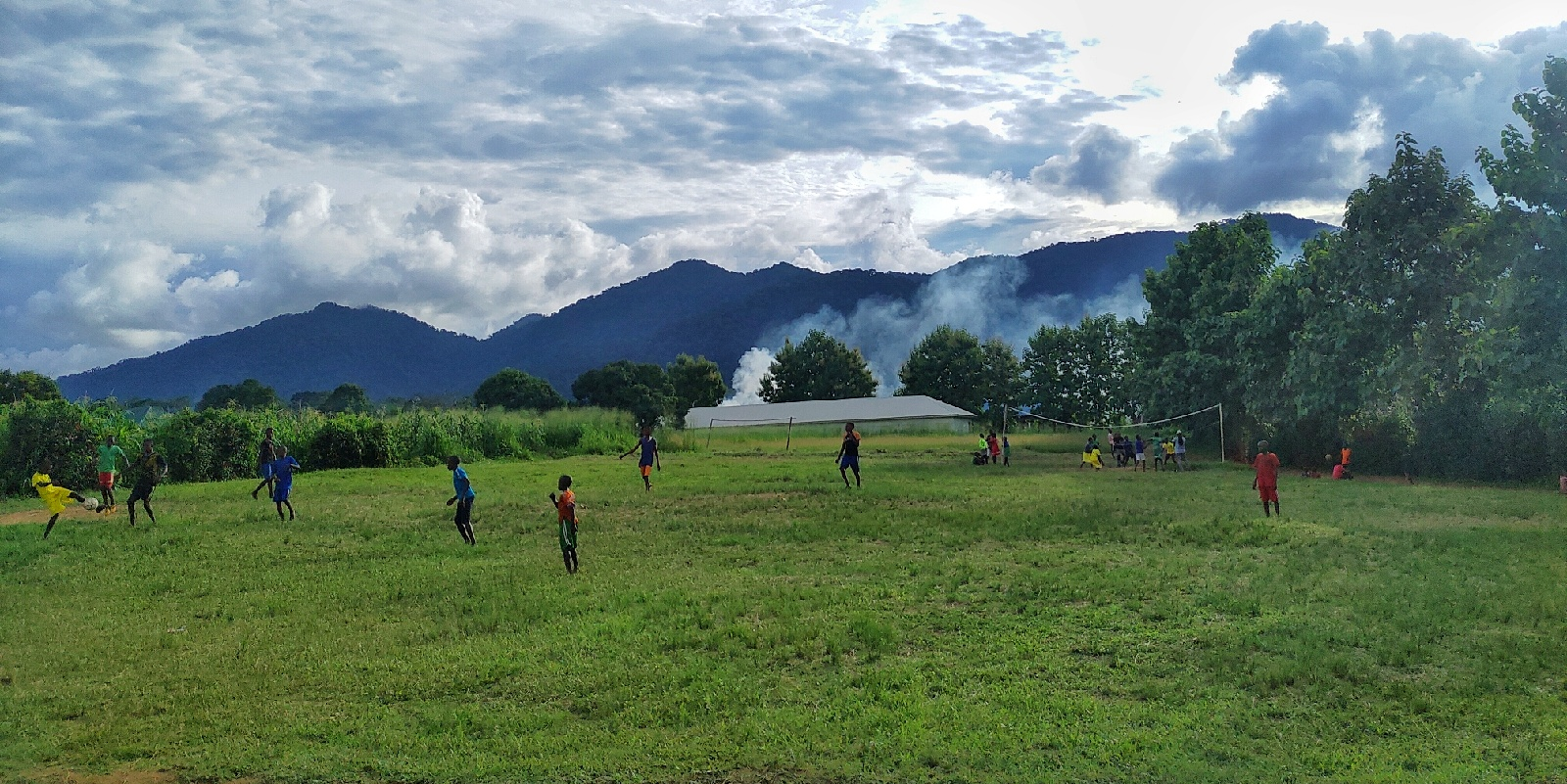
A football match in a community neighboring the mountain

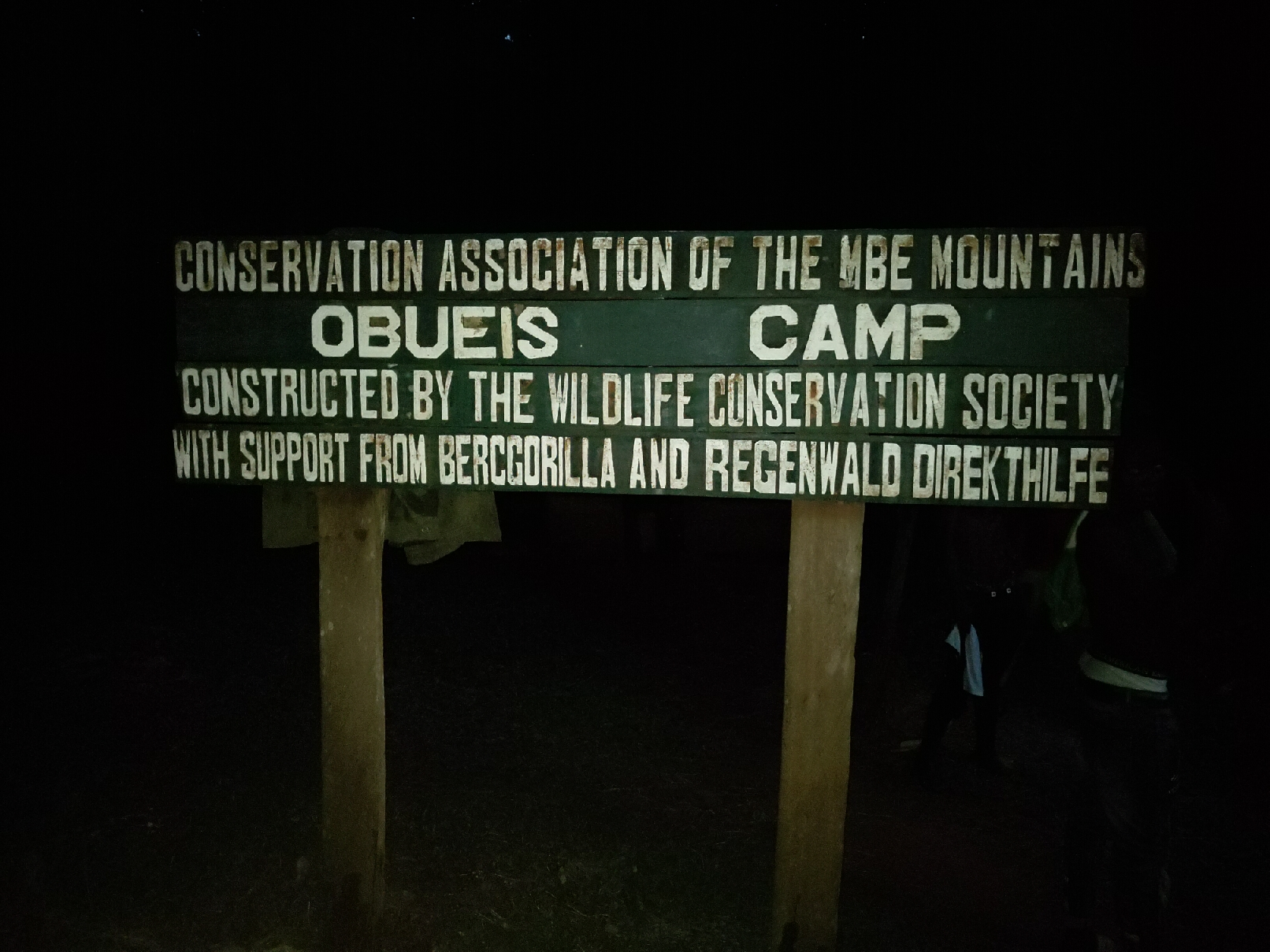
Signage of WCS Ranger camp at the foot of the mountain, named after an ancient hunter that first camped at the location
