= Afi Mountain Wildlife Sanctuary =

Protected area in southern Nigeria

Coordinates: 6°20′N 9°00′E

The Afi Mountain Wildlife Sanctuary in Cross River State in southern Nigeria covers 104 km^{2} (40 sq mi). The wildlife sanctuary was founded in 2000 to provide refuge for endangered animal species, including the Cross River gorilla, the Nigeria-Cameroon chimpanzee, the drill and the gray-necked rockfowl.

Afi is managed by the Cross River State Forestry Commission/Ministry of Climate Change and Forestry. Although the steep mountainous slopes of the sanctuary have largely protected the forest from logging, it is frequently damaged by dry-season bush fires that are set to clear land for farming or to catch game. Open areas created by fire are quickly colonized by herb species which form an important staple food for gorillas. The largest African wintering ground of the European swallow is in the western part of the sanctuary, where an estimated 20 million of these birds roost during the winter. The Sanctuary is surrounded by 16 communities with a total population of approximately 27,000 people.

== Location and wildlife ==
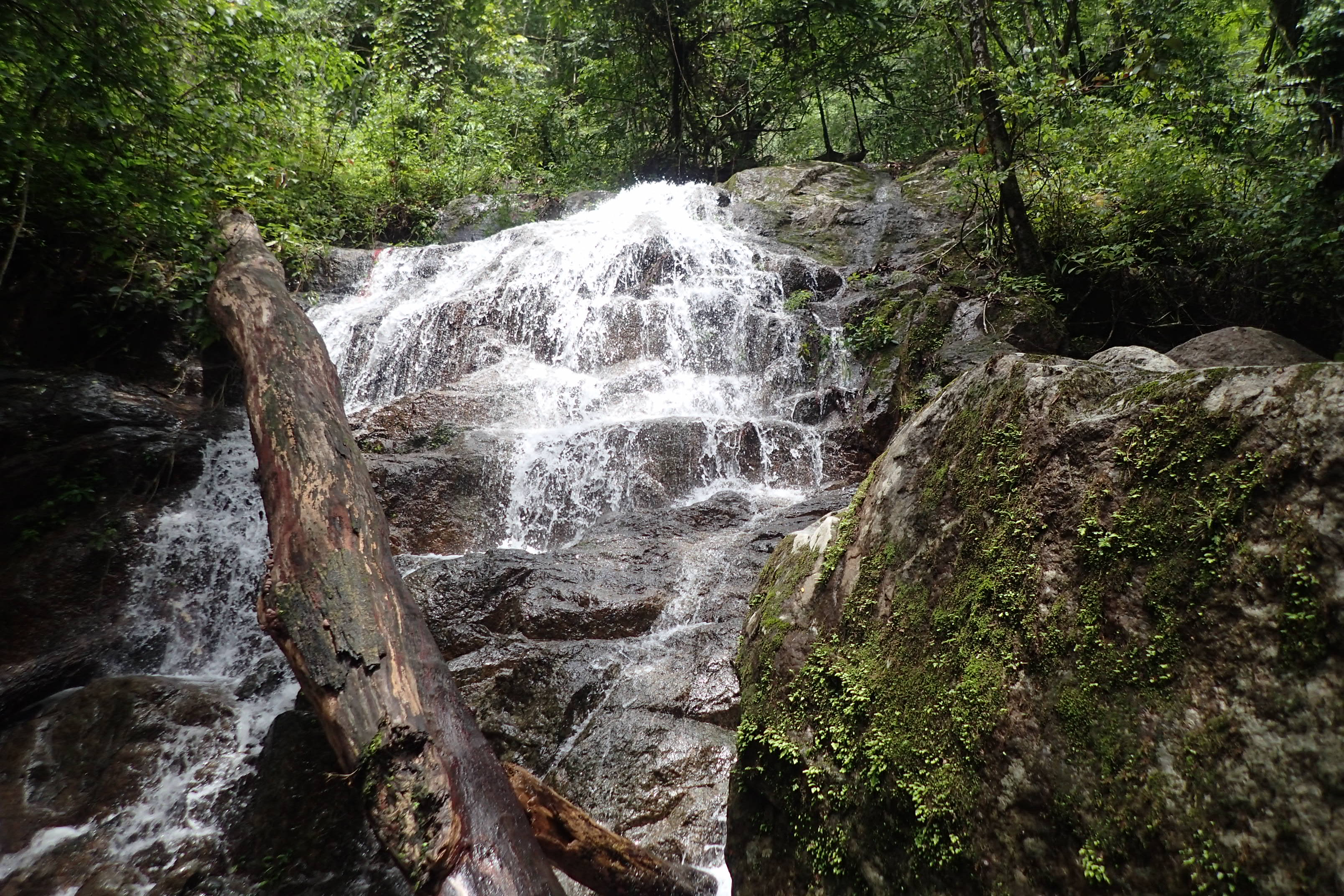
Waterfall in Afi Mountain Wildlife Sanctuary

This sanctuary is a biodiversity hotspot within the mountainous and relatively rugged rainforest area at the border of Southeastern Nigeria and Southwestern Cameroon. In May 2000, the Cross River State Government established this sanctuary with the primary goal of safeguarding endemic and endangered wildlife species, with a particular focus on the Cross River gorilla (Gorilla gorilla diehli), Nigerian-Cameroon chimpanzee (Pan troglodytes eliotii), and drill (Mandrillus leucophaeus). Surrounding this protected area are sixteen human communities, which include Katabang, Buanchor, Olum, Enyi, Kakwagom, Esekwe, Ebok-Ebuawa, Asuben, Bitiah, Kakubok, Ndemachang, Katchie, Ebbaken, Okubuchi, Nkanyia, and Njua-Kaku.

The entire region falls within a broad annual rainfall zone, receiving an average of 3,000 mm to 3,800 mm of rainfall, with variations increasing from lowland to uphill areas. The rainy season typically spans from March to September, while the dry season extends from October to March. The mean temperature across Afi Mountain is approximately 22.2 °C, but it rises to 27.4 °C in the lowland areas. The protected region is primarily situated in the tropical high forest vegetation zone and is rich in various tree species, including Pterocarpus osun, Albizia zygia, Parkia bicolor, Pycnanthus angolensis, Irvingia gabonensis, and Monodora myristica. Additionally, the Afi Mountain Wildlife Sanctuary (AMWS) is home to notable wildlife species such as the red river hog (Potamochoerus porcus), bushbuck (Tragelaphus scriptus), Shelley's eagle owl (Bubo shelleyi), African piculet (Sasia africana), migrating European barn swallows (Hirundo rustica), and the bare-necked rockfowl (Picarthertes oreas).

== Features ==
Afi is covered by an estimated 100 km^{2} of lowland and sub-montane forest with rocky peaks rising to 1,300 m (1,400 yd; 4,300 ft). Although the steep mountainous slopes of the sanctuary have largely protected it from logging. The forest is frequently damaged by dry-season bush fires set to clear new farms or to flush game.

== Tourism ==
The Afi Mountain Ranch provides accommodation for tourists in cabins. The ranch has a walkway through the forest canopy, 25 metres or 82 feet above the ground.
