= Bete-Bendi language =

Atlantic–Congo language of Nigeria

Bete-Bendi
- Bendi
- Native to: Nigeria
- Native speakers: 100,000 (2006)
- Language family: Niger–Congo?: Atlantic–Congo languages; Benue–Congo languages; Southern Bantoid languages?; Bendi languages; Bete-Bendi
- Dialects: Bendi; Bete

Language codes
- ISO 639-3: btt
- Glottolog: bete1262

Bete-Bendi, or Bendi, is one of the Bendi languages of Nigeria. There were an estimated 100,000 speakers as of 2006.
