= Bokyi language =

Bendi language spoken in Nigeria and Cameroon

Bokyi
- Boki
- Native to: Southeastern Nigeria, southwestern Cameroon
- Ethnicity: Bokyi people
- Native speakers: 280,000 (2005–2020)
- Language family: Niger–Congo?: Atlantic–Congo; Benue–Congo; Southern Bantoid?; Bendi; Bokyi

Language codes
- ISO 639-3: bky
- Glottolog: boky1238

Bokyi (Boki, Nfua, Nki, Okii, Osikom, Osukam, Uki, Vaaneroki) is a regionally important Bendi language spoken by the Bokyi people of northern Cross River State, Nigeria. It is ranked amongst the first fifteen languages of the about 520 living languages in Nigeria, with a few thousand speakers in Cameroon.

Major dialects include Abu (Abo, Baswo), Irruan, Osokom (Okundi) and Wula. In 2026, Roger Blench determined Abu to be a separate Bendi language that is not particularly closely related to Bokyi.
