= List of tourist attractions in Nigeria =

List of tourist attraction in Nigeria

There are several tourist attractions in Nigeria, each with its own uniqueness, nature, structure and historical background.

== List of tourist attractions in Nigeria ==
This is a list of notable tourist attraction. In Nigeria, arranged in alphabetical order.

- Abuja National Mosque
- Agbokim Waterfalls
- Agodi Gardens
- Ahmadu Bello University Zoo
- Alok Ikom Monoliths
- Ancient Kano City Walls
- Aso Rock
- Apapa Amusement Park
- Awhum Waterfall
- Badagry Slave Trade Route
- Bar Beach, Lagos
- Benin City Walls
- Benue River
- Biu Plateau
- Bina Footprint
- Chad Basin
- Coconut Beach
- Cross River National Park
- Dreamworld Africana
- Eko Atlantic City
- Elegushi Beach
- Emotan Statue
- Erin-Ijesha Waterfalls
- Ezeagu Tourist Complex
- Gashaka Gumti National Park
- Gurara Waterfalls
- Hi-Impact Planet
- Ibeno Beach
- Idanre Hill
- Iho Eleru Cave
- IITA Forest Reserve
- Ikogosi Warm Springs
- Ikom Monoliths
- Isaac Boro Park
- Jabi Lake
- Jos Wildlife Park
- Kainji Dam
- Kainji National Park
- Kamuku National Park
- Kwame Nkrumah Mausoleum
- Lake Chad
- Lekki Beach
- Lekki Conservation Centre
- Lekki Ikoyi Link Bridge
- Mambilla Plateau
- Mandara Mountains
- Millennium Park (Abuja)
- Mount Patti
- National Arts Theatre
- National War Museum, Umuahia
- National Stadium Abuja
- New Afrika Shrine
- Ngwo Pine forest
- Niger River
- Oban Hills
- Obudu Cattle Ranch
- Obudu Plateau
- Ogbaukwu Caves and Waterfalls
- Ogbunike Caves
- Okomu Forest Reserve
- Okomu National Park
- Old Oyo National Park
- Olumo Rock
- Omenka Gallery
- Oron Museum
- Osun-Osogbo
- Port Harcourt Pleasure Park
- Port Harcourt Tourist Beach
- Queen Amina Statue
- Royal Palace of Oba of Benin
- Shere Hills
- Sir Lugard Empire Hill
- Sukur Cultural Landscape
- The Cathedral Church of Christ
- Tinapa Resort
- Yankari National Park
- Zuma Rock
