= List of beaches in Nigeria =

Beaches in Nigeria

Beaches in Nigeria is a list of notable beaches along the Atlantic coast and the Gulf of Guinea in Nigeria. The country's coastline stretches across several states, offering a variety of public, private, and resort beaches. These beaches are known for recreation, water sports, cultural events, and tourism.

== Lagos State ==
- Tarkwa Bay Beach - An island beach accessible only by boat, known for swimming, surfing, and picnics.
- Elegushi Beach - A beach in Lekki known for nightclubs, restaurants, and social events.
- Alpha Beach - A beach in Lekki for relaxation, picnics, and seaside walks.
- Bar Beach - A Victoria Island beach used for jogging, picnics, and leisure.
- Oniru Beach - A private beach in Victoria Island, for leisure and social gatherings.
- La Campagne Tropicana Beach Resort - A resort beach combining natural scenery with cultural activities.

== Akwa Ibom State ==
- Ibeno Beach - One of the longest sand beaches in Nigeria, known for walking, horseback riding, and water sports.

== Rivers State ==
- Finima Beach (Bonny Island) - A sandy coastal area on Bonny Island used for recreation and nature walks.
- Port Harcourt Tourist Beach - Urban beach providing leisure space for residents and visitors.

== Other States and Regions ==
- Calabar Beach, Cross River State - Coastal beach near Calabar for local recreation.
- Asaba Beach, Delta State - A coastal beach in Asaba for relaxation and seaside activities.
- Ndibe Sand Beach, Ebonyi State - A sand beach in Afikpo-North used for leisure and coastal walks.
- Patigi Beach, Kwara State - A riverfront beach along the Niger River popular for fishing and boating.
- Okpoama Beach, Bayelsa State - Coastal beach used for local recreation and events.

== See also ==
- Tourism in Nigeria
- Geography of Nigeria
- List of islands of Nigeria
