= Awhum Waterfall =

Waterfall in Enugu State, Nigeria

- Awhum falls
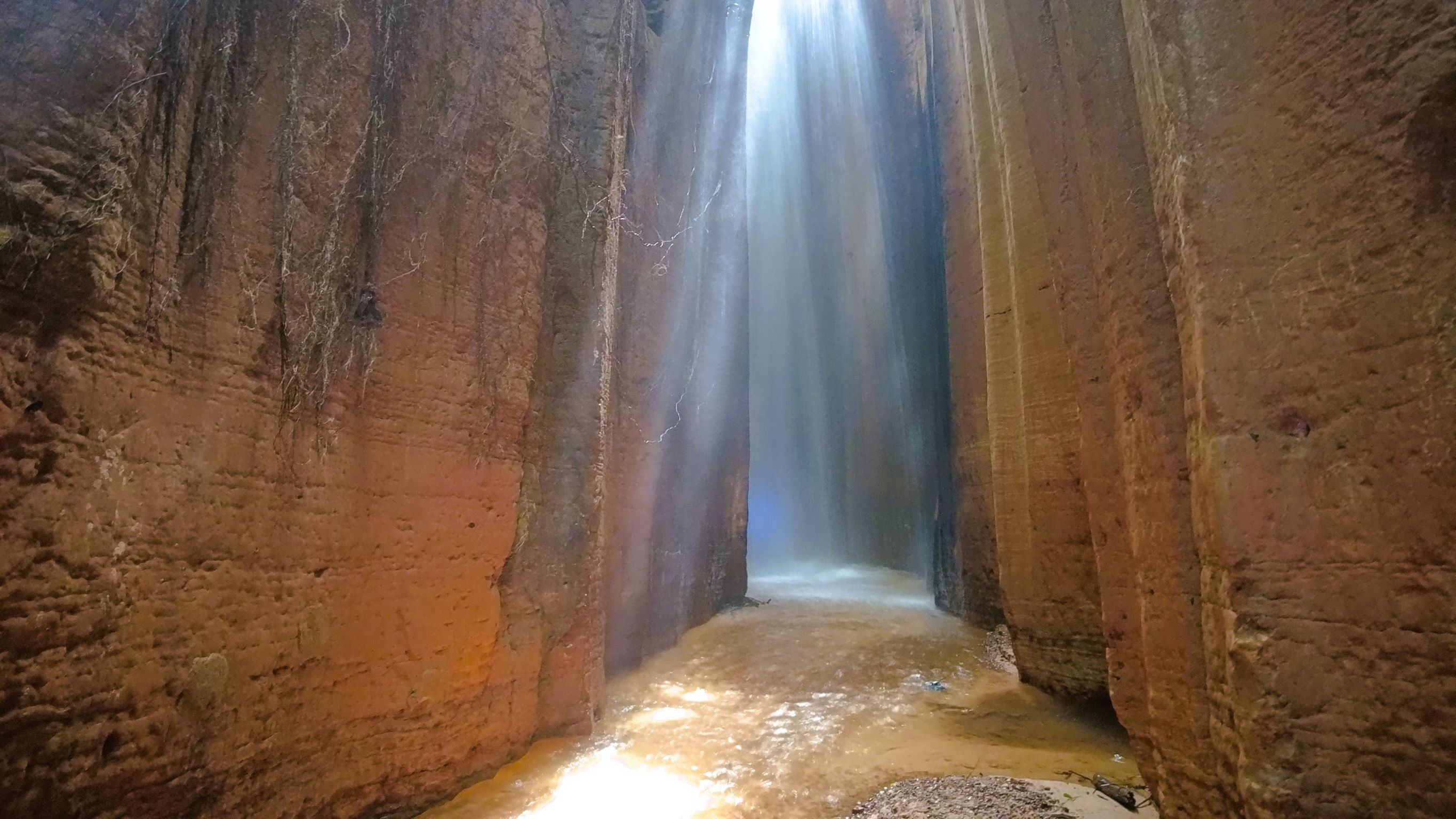
- Awhum falls, Enugu State, Nigeria

- Location within Nigeria
- Coordinates: 6.5293°N 7.4111°E

The Awhum Waterfall is located at Amu-Ugwu village of Awhum town in Udi Local Government Area, Enugu State, Nigeria. The Awhum Waterfall is formed out of a massive outcrop of granite rock with water flow at the top forming a stream. Some part of the waterfall is usually warm through the seasons. The Awhum waterfall is 30 metres high and is located near the Awhum Monastery.

The water is said to be curative (have healing power) and capable of dispelling evil forces if and wherever it is sprinkled. It takes about 50 minutes walk from the parking spot to the fall. The site is particularly good for religious tourism.

The Awhum Waterfall is also a popular tourist location in Nigeria.

Footage showing the cascade and flow of the water.

== History ==
Since the cave has been around for a very long time, its origins are unknown. During the Nigerian Civil War, the people sought safety inside the cave because bombs could not demolish it. Traditionalists administered the location before to the monks' arrival in 1975.

== People in charge ==
The Our Lady of Mount Calvary Monastery, a nearby Catholic organization, manages the water cave even though it is owned by the Awhum village.

Visitors to the cave and waterfall (apart from locals) must pay a charge before being permitted entry.

Visitors to the cave can rent lodgings inside the monastery for N2,000 per night. According to a security officer, holidays like Christmas and Easter typically see more people visiting the monastery.

== Gallery ==
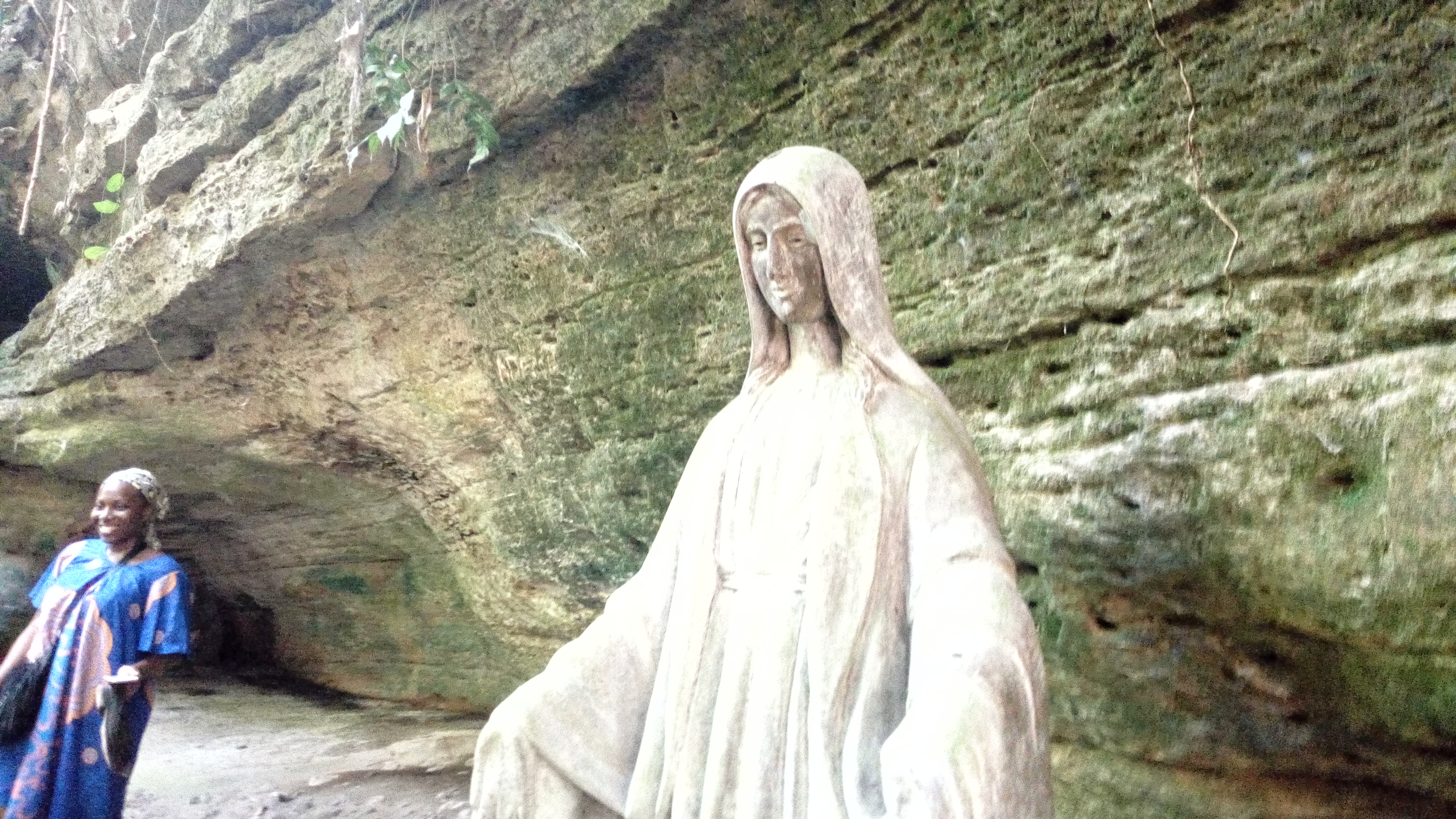

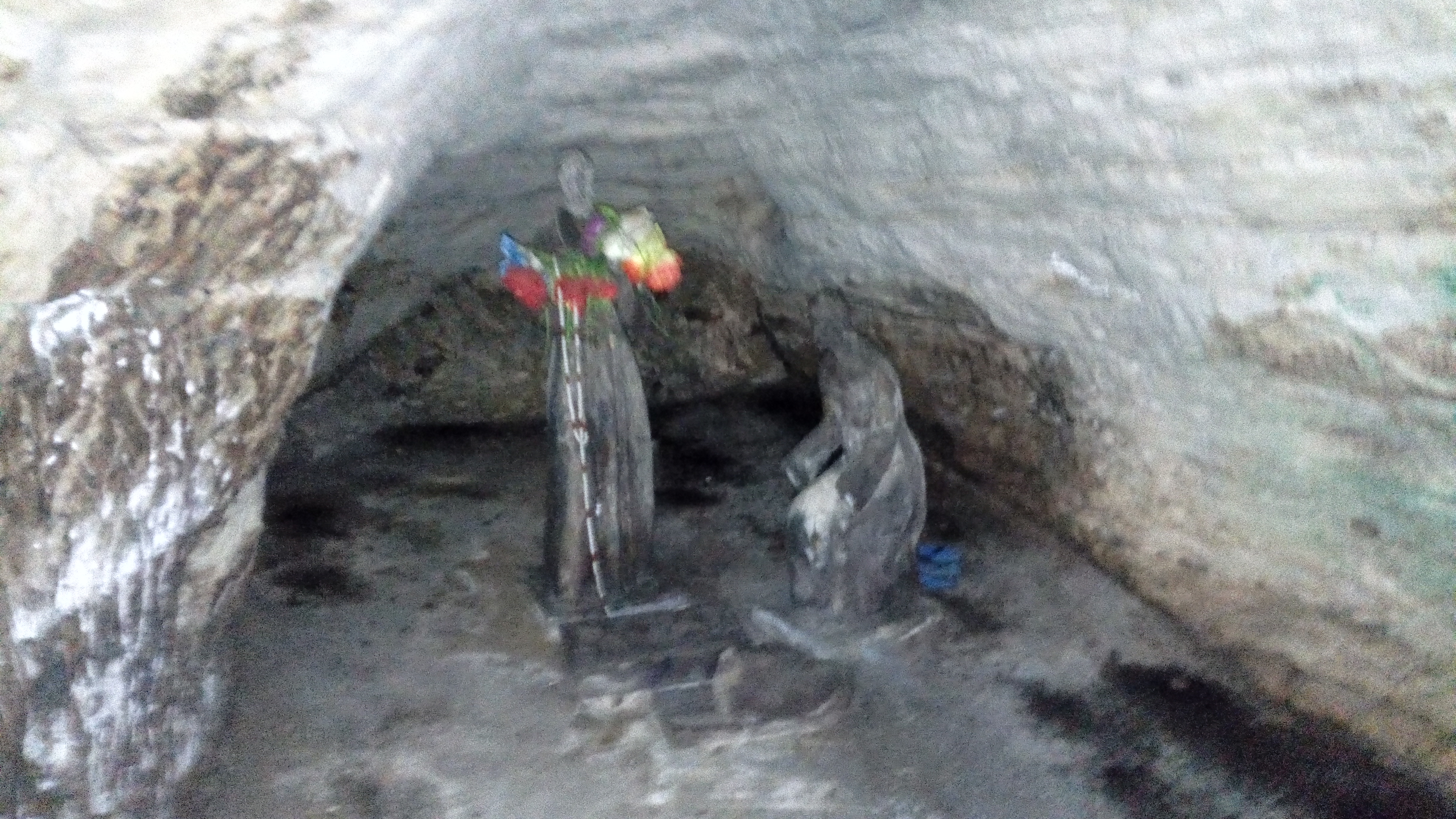

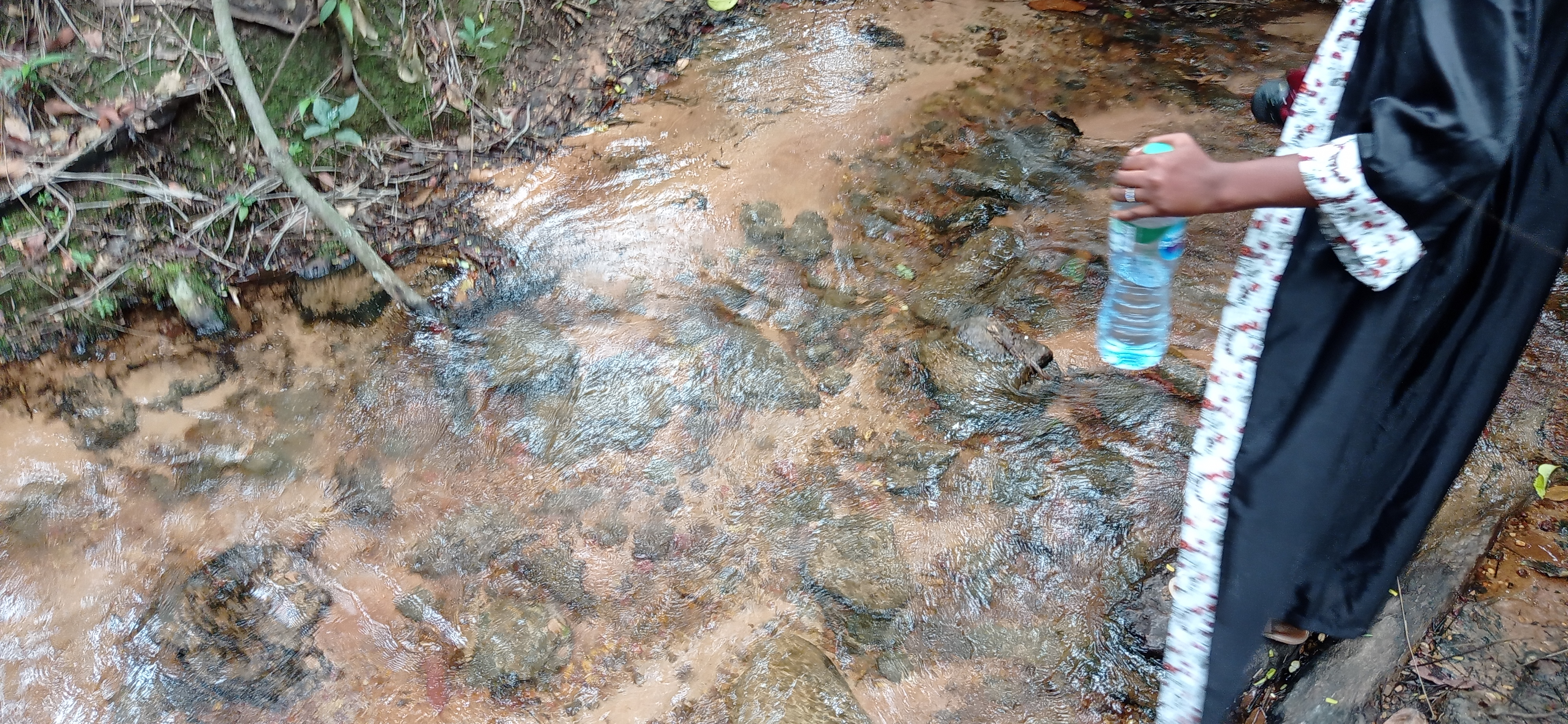

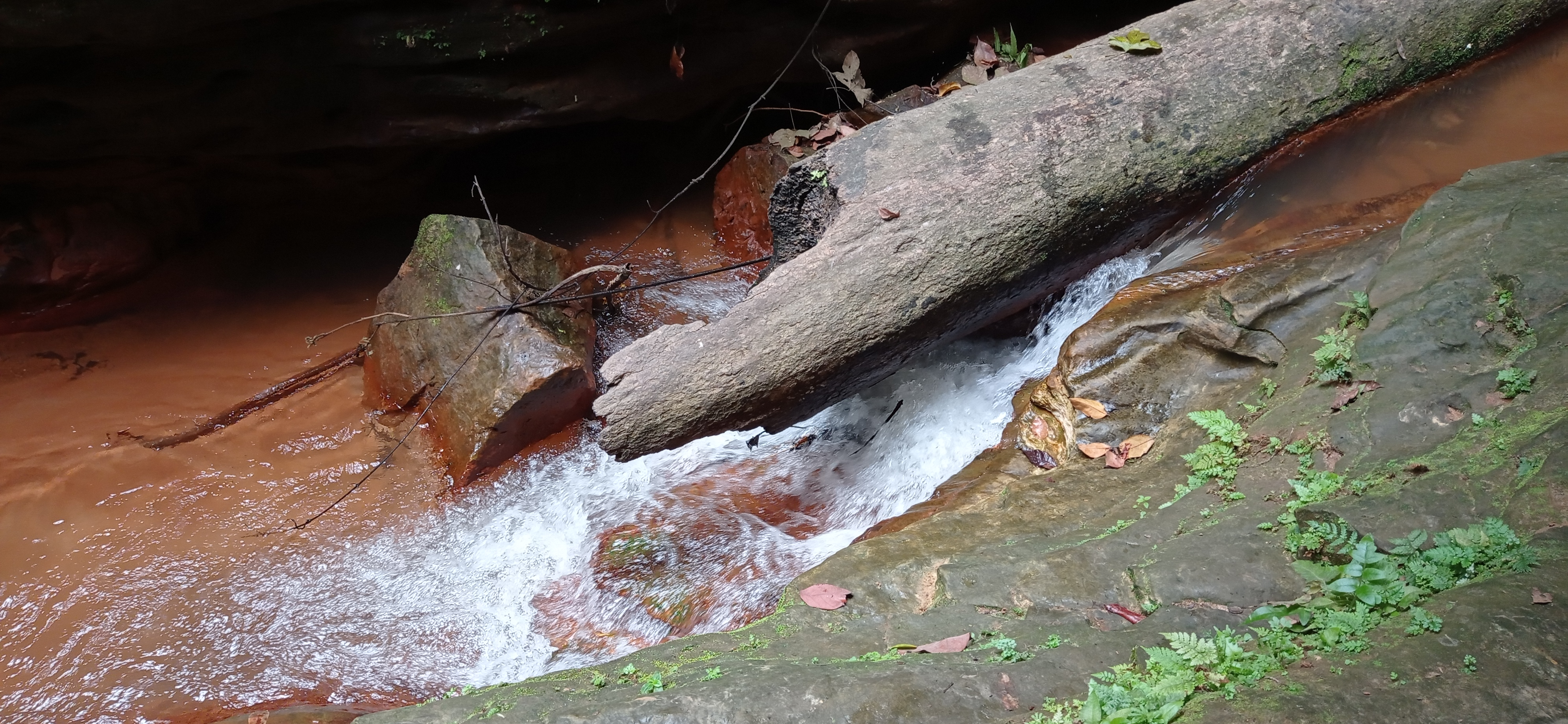

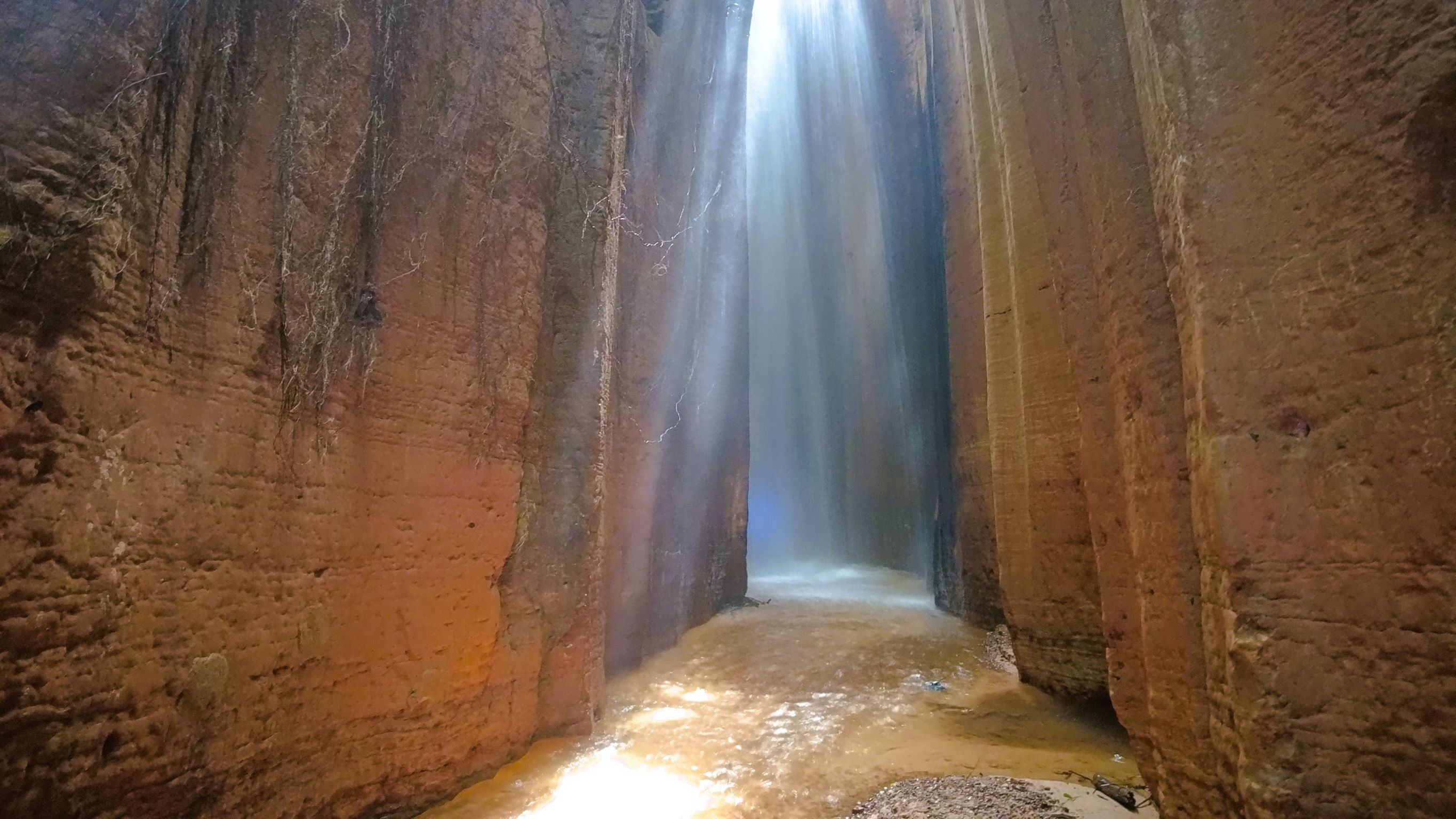
Awhum Water Fall Enugu, Nigeria

== See also ==
- Agbokim Waterfalls
- Erin-Ijesha Waterfalls
- List of waterfalls
