= Finima Beach =

Coastal beach in Bonny Island, Rivers State, Nigeria

Coordinates: 4°24′27.07″N 7°8′10.99″E

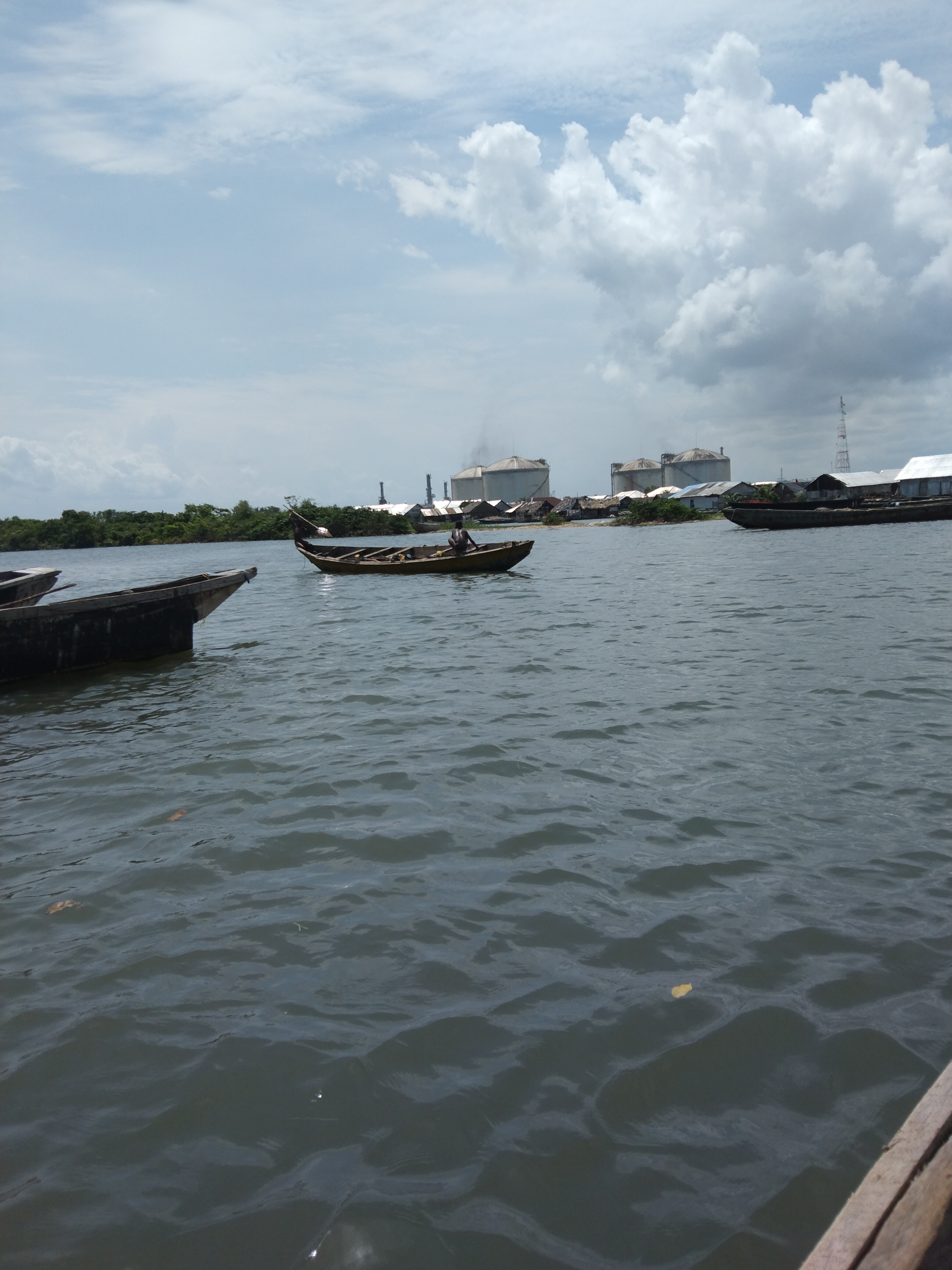
Finima Lighthouse Beach

Finima Beach is a coastal beach located in the community of Finima on Bonny Island in Rivers State, Nigeria. The beach forms part of a wider coastal and natural environment that includes stretches of sandy shoreline facing the Atlantic Ocean and is a recreational area frequently visited by locals, tourists, and residents during sunny days and festive periods.

== Location and surroundings ==
Finima Beach is situated within the Finima community on Bonny Island, a locality at the southern edge of Rivers State along the Atlantic coastline of Nigeria. The beach lies near areas of mangrove swamp and tropical rainforest that characterize the local ecology, part of the wider coastal landscape of the Niger Delta region.

== Features ==
Finima Beach consists of long stretches of sandy shoreline that are suitable for beach walks, gatherings, picnics, and relaxation by the sea. The area is typically more visited during sunny days and festive periods.

The beach is part of a broader eco‑tourism and natural area that neighbors the Finima Nature Park, a 1,000‑hectare area of forests, wetlands, and biodiversity conservation set up by Nigeria LNG's environmental programme, which includes coastal and mangrove habitats characteristic of the Niger Delta.

== See also ==
- Bonny Island
- Ibeno Beach
- Rivers State
- List of beaches in Nigeria
