= Ikogosi Warm Springs =

Thermal springs in Nigeria

Coordinates: 7.5900362°N 4.9917422°E

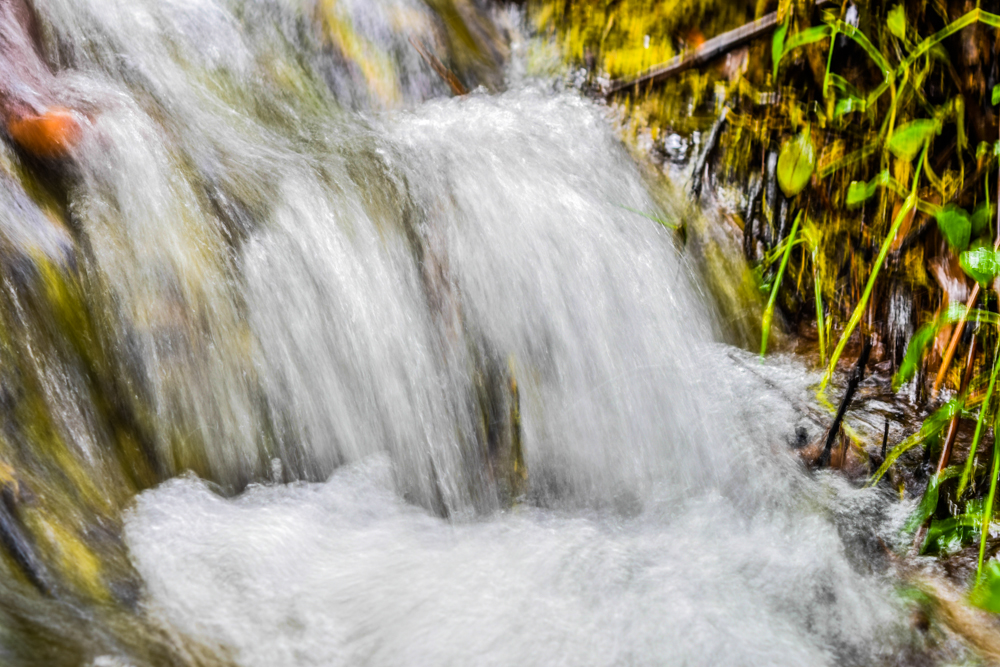
Ikogosi-Ekiti Warm Springs

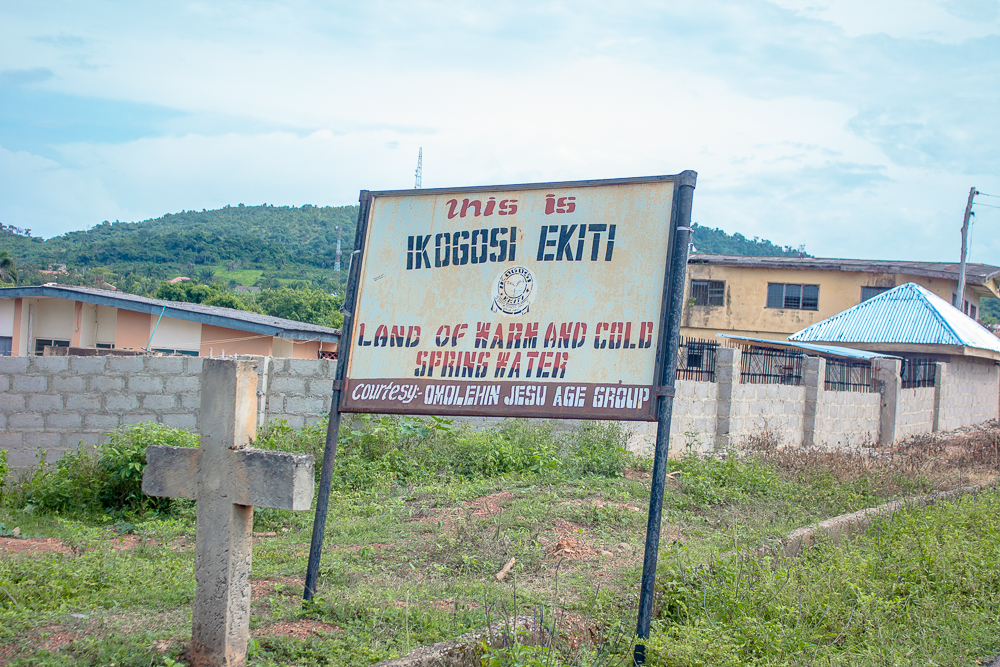
Welcome to Ikogosi Ekiti

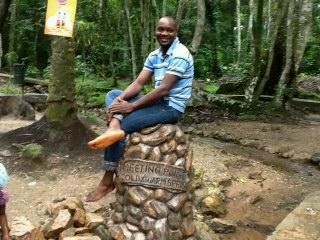
A man sitting at the confluence of the springs

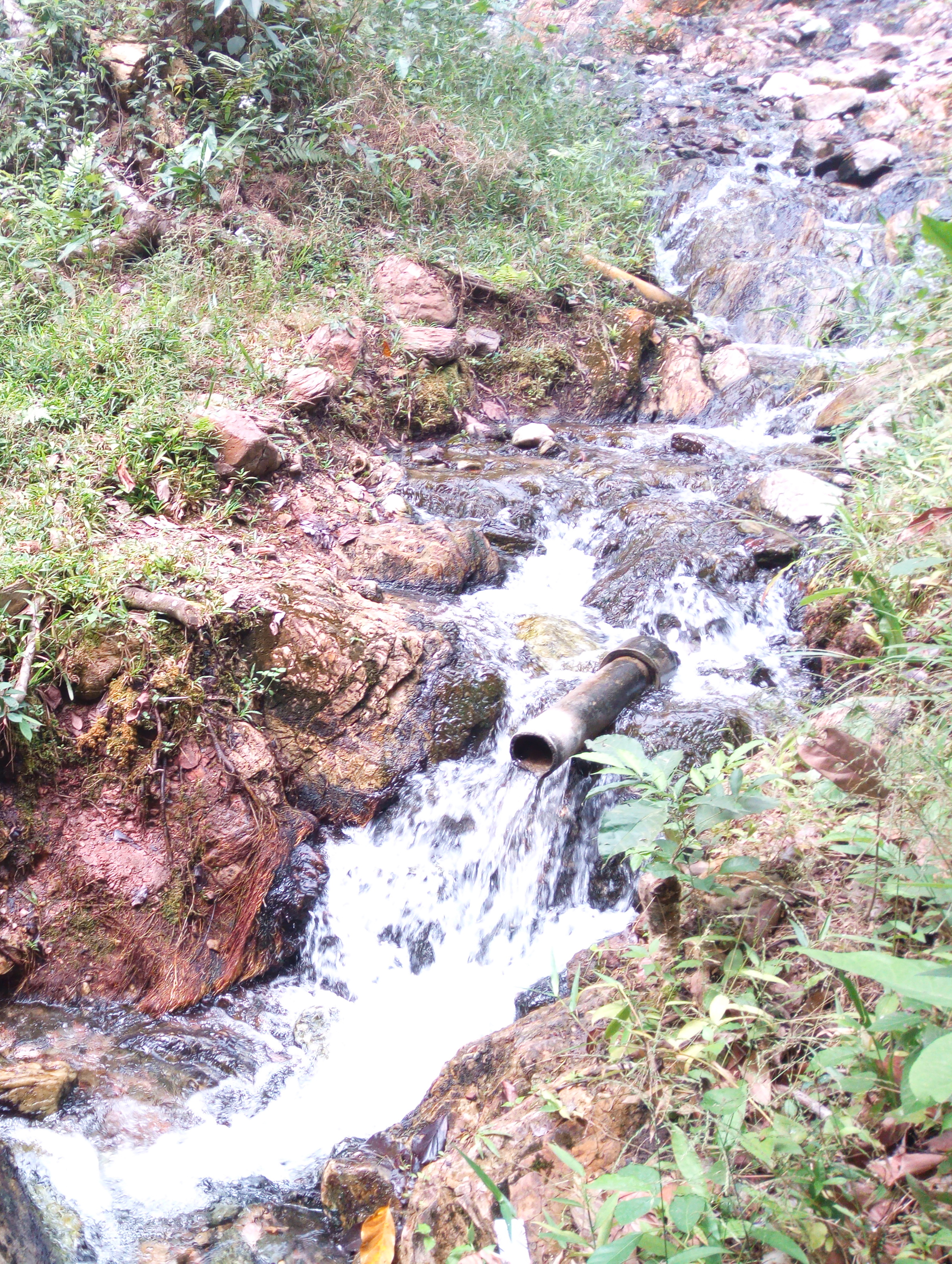
Ikogosi Warm Spring, Ekiti State, Nigeria - 1

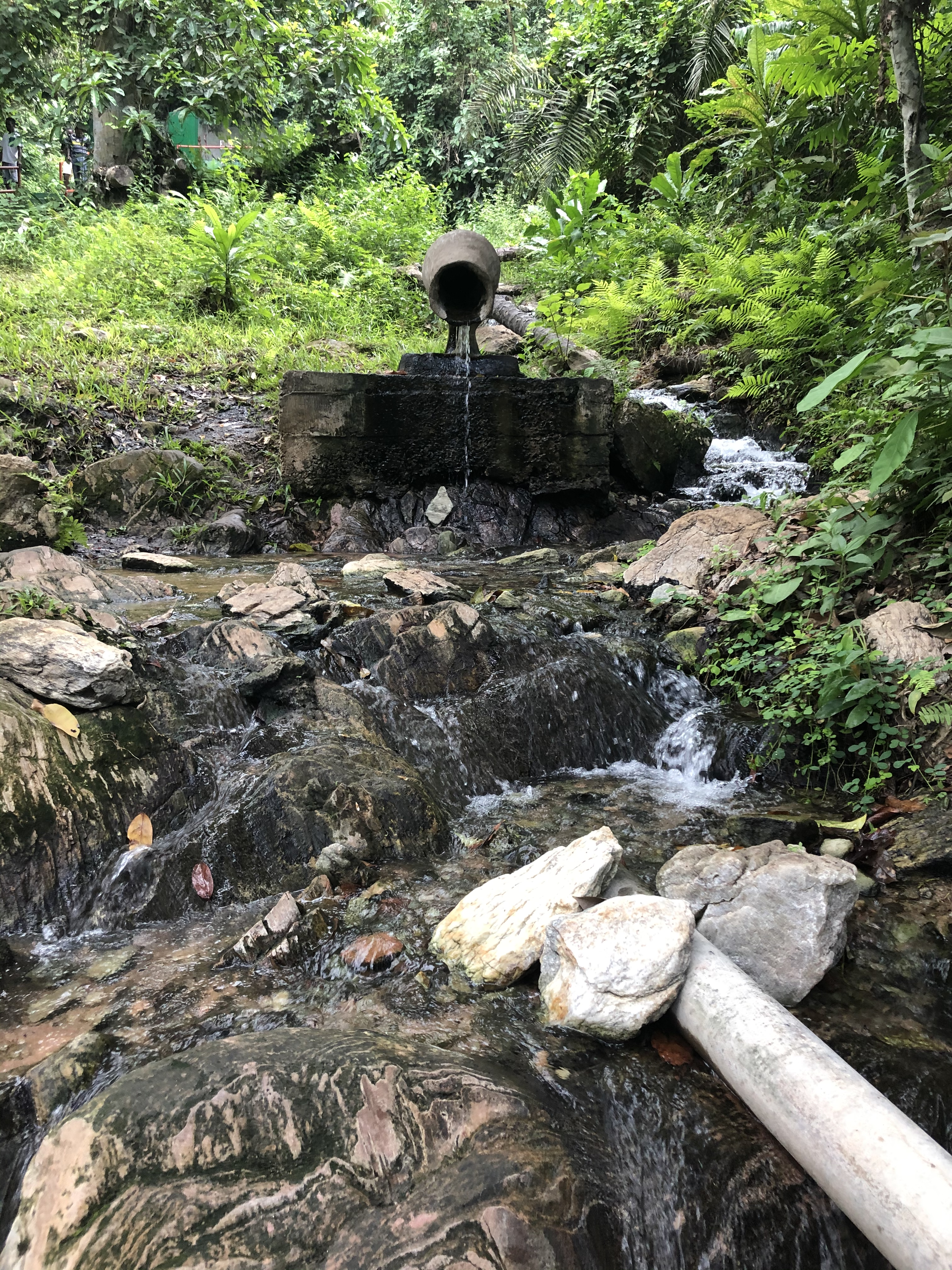
Ikogosi Warm springs Ekiti State Nigeria

The Ikogosi Warm Springs is a tourist attraction located at Ikogosi, a town in Ekiti State, southwestern Nigeria. Flowing abreast the warm spring is another cold spring which meets the warm spring at a confluence, each maintaining its thermal properties. These attributes make the spring a tourist attraction in Nigeria. Research suggested that the warm spring has a temperature of about 70 °C (158 °F) at the source and 37 °C (99 °F) at the confluence.

== Background and history of the Ikogosi Warm Springs (1952-1977) ==
In 1952, Southern Baptist missionary, Rev. John S. McGee, from his mission base in the nearby Ekiti town of Igede, went to the source of the hot and cold springs, about which he had heard from the Ikogosi people. Initially, he was discouraged from doing this, for reasons of the tradition he had heard from the local residents, which was that nobody should ever visit the source of these two streams, because of the idea that to do so would be to invite death from the supernatural forces that were responsible for this strange, and most unusual, feature of nature. In spite of these "warnings," Rev. McGee made his way through the bush/forest, up the hill to the source of the two side-by-side springs. According to Rev. McGee's later brief, written account, "After seeing it, I felt that it could be used for a good purpose. I discussed the possible use of it with some of the Mission and (Nigerian Baptist) Convention friends. With the growing interest of Royal Ambassador work, and youth work, we felt that it could best be used by building a Youth Camp. I took it up with the Ekiti Association and we decided to build a camp for our R.A.s and G.A.s. The land was secured through the Convention."

Having had the water from both springs tested to ensure its purity, Rev. McGee, with support from the Ekiti Baptist Association of churches and the Nigerian Baptist Convention who secured 28 acres of land which was the original camp, began planning for the building of the camp. The Baptist Mission architect, Rev. Wilfred Congdon (located at the Baptist Mission in Oshogbo) drew the design and plans for the original (16) buildings, which were built in this order: the swimming pool, fed by the warm springs (built in 1962); a combination dining hall, large kitchen and storage areas; eight (8) small cabins, each of which could house sixteen persons, with sleeping, bath and toilet facilities; a Baptist Mission residence, which was occupied by the McGees from the middle 1960s until October, 1973, when the McGee's received word from Ibadan, that the Nigerian government was taking control of the camp; and finally, a chapel, was completed in the late 1960s. By 1972, all the buildings of the original Nigerian Baptist Convention camp had been completed, and the camp was being visited regularly by groups of Baptist youth and adults, along with missionaries and other visitors who came for vacation/"local leave." According to a letter from Mrs. Doris McGee, "In 1968, we had 734 people stay at the camp either in the 12 camps or retreats, or on local leave or vacations. Already in the first four months of this year we have had 322 people in seven camps or retreats or for rest."

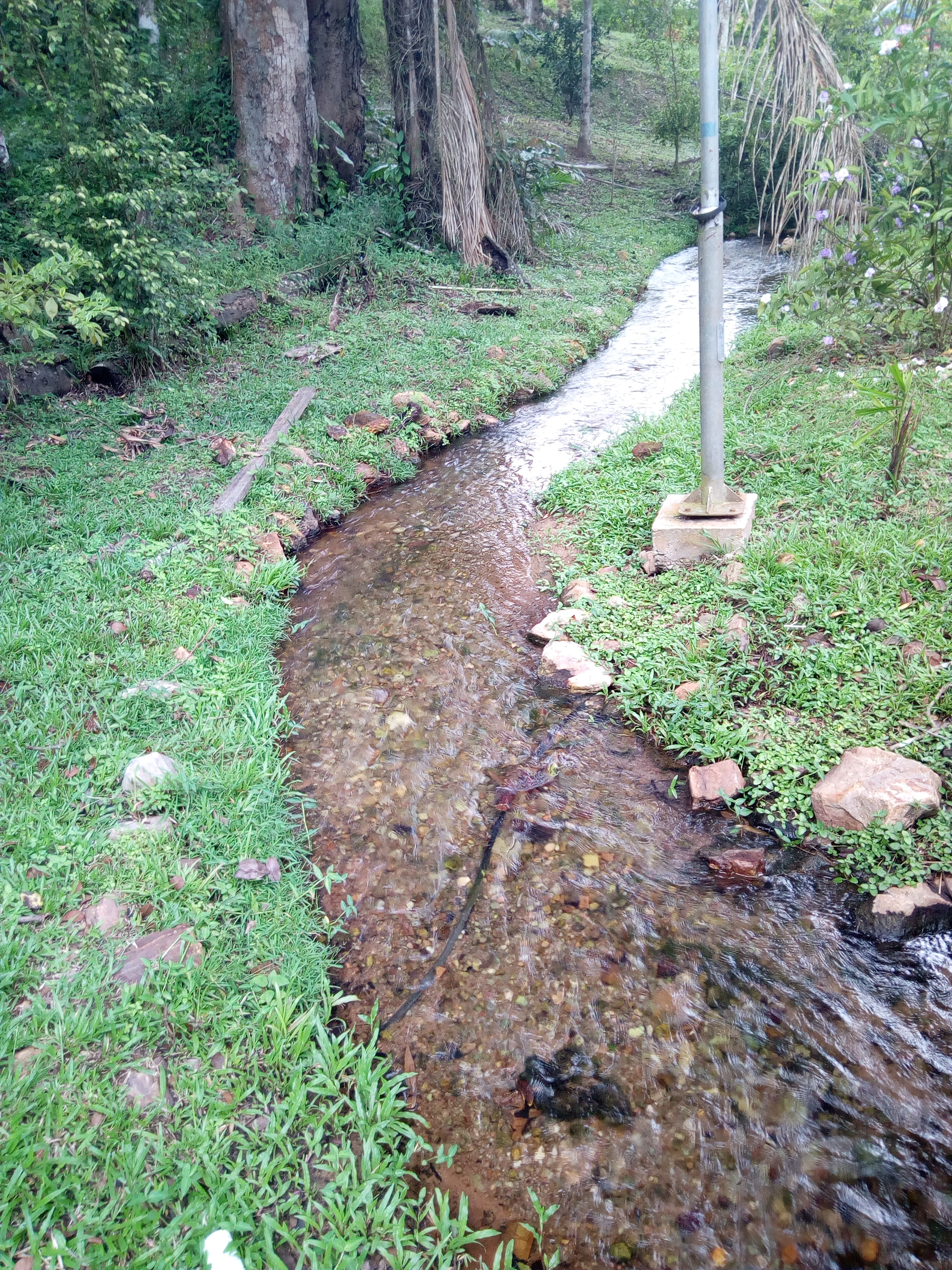
Waterpath of the Ikogosi Cold and Warm Spring

In the late 1960s and early 1970s, following the Biafran Civil War, some public opposition to the Baptist Camp began to develop, particularly as the McGees resisted public/military use of the camp, as they gave firm priority to the religious events and groups for which it had been built. News from the Lagos area alleged that the facility being developed at the warm springs was the work of the (U.S.) Central Intelligence Agency, for political purposes. One newspaper, in particular, expressed the negative and critical views of one well-known writer, Dr. Tai Solarin, based on the misinformation that was being circulated. Finally, some prominent alumni ("old boys") of the Baptist College at Iwo (now Bowen University) brought Dr. Solarin to the Ikogosi camp to be introduced and to meet with Rev. McGee. My father told me that they were all together in my father's office at their house at the camp, when he went and got the "Prestigious Beaded Walking Stick," which had been presented to him by the Ewi of Ado in 1961. He showed it to Dr. Solarin and told him, "Your people do not give this to someone who does not love them." My father said that Dr. Solarin looked at it with amazement and asked, "Where did you get this?!" When my father told him, Dr. Solarin's attitude changed completely. Nonetheless, by early 1971, news of the Baptist Camp was becoming much more known by persons (outside of the Baptist Mission and Nigerian Convention) who saw possibilities for the development of a commercial, tourist resort. By December 22, 1973, the government had opened its guest house which was located by the warm springs swimming pool, and the following month, January 18, 1974, the McGees received word that the government was taking control of the swimming pool, the Baptist Camp's featured attraction. From that time forward, the activity at the camp significantly declined, with the McGees continuing to manage the facilities (other than the pool) from their Baptist Mission residence at Igede, until their retirement from Nigeria. When the McGees retired from Nigeria in July 1977, Rev. McGee was installed as "Chief Akorewolu of Ikogosi," by the Loja of Ikogosi Ekiti, in a ceremony that occurred on 1 July 1977. This followed Rev. McGee's having been installed as "Chief Gbaiyegun" by the Onigede, Chiefs and people of Igede on March 10, 1957. As mentioned above, in 1961, Rev. McGee was given the "Prestigious Beaded Walking Stick" by King Aladesanmi II of Ado-Ekiti, on behalf of the Ekiti Baptist Association. Unfortunately, for the future of the Baptist "Warm Springs" Camp at Ikogosi, when the McGees left, there was no Mission or Convention person available or willing to manage the camp, and in 1978, the entire property was sold to the Nigerian government by the Nigerian Baptist Convention, for the price of three hundred thousand Naira. Within a matter of fewer than ten years, when the McGees very briefly visited Igede and Ikogosi (1985), the camp had been covered with bush. Rev. McGee, who walked to the camp on the road there he had built, told me that he did not bother to try to enter the camp grounds, and could barely see the buildings which were already being covered by bush. As already described above, by the early-middle 1970s, the Nigerian government took control of the swimming pool, and had built some guest chalets adjacent to it, with a separate entrance road from that which the McGees had built to the camp entrance. From that time forward, there was always the hope/intention of developing that area for tourist purposes, but it was not until the past three or four years (2011-2014), that the Ekiti government under the leadership of its Governor, was able to enter into an agreement with resources which have been able to develop the facilities to their current high level. Just for the record, for those who may be interested, any of the current, renovated buildings which have a STONE portion of their exterior, are buildings which were preserved from the original Baptist

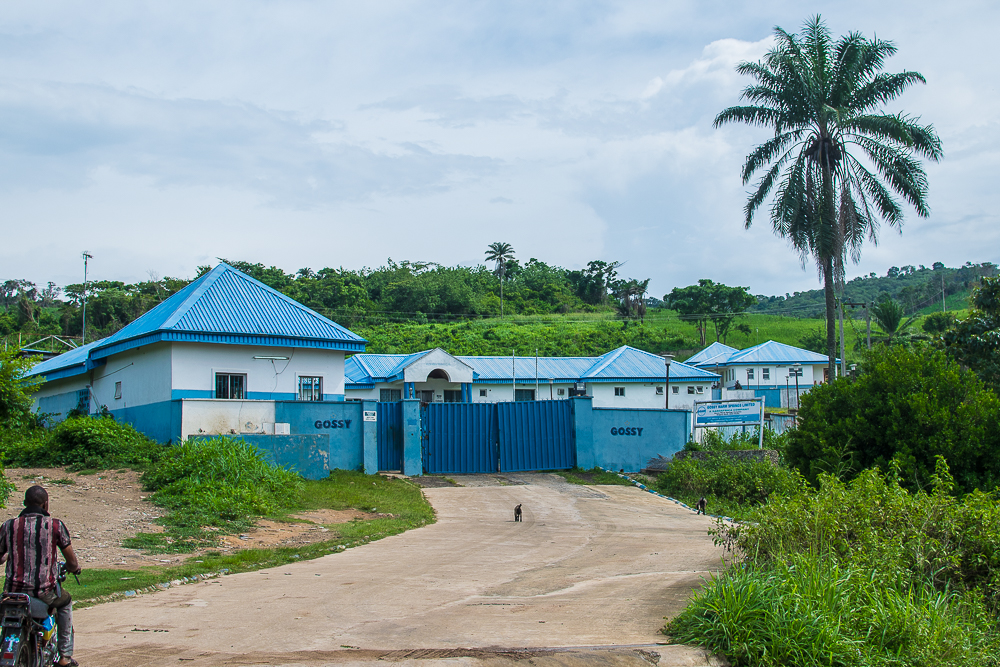
Cossy Water Factory, Ikogosi Ekiti

== See also ==
- List of hot springs
- Erin-Ijesha Waterfalls
- List of tourist attractions in Nigeria
