= Badagry Coconut Beach =

Beach in Badagry, Lagos State, Nigeria

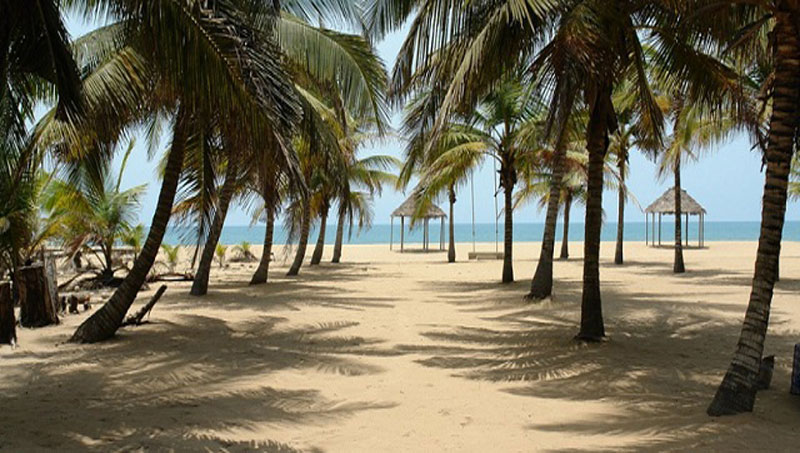

Badagry Coconut Beach is located in Badagry town in the West at Asakpo community Lagos State, Nigeria. It is situated at Asakpo community in Badagry West LCDA towards the border of the Benin Republic. The beach is surrounded by holiday resorts where people can rest, and receive refreshments and entertainment while visiting the beach. According to reports, “Badagry currently harbors two million coconut trees and has the potential of having 10 million trees.”
