= Bina Footprint =

Tourist in Nigeria

Coordinates: 8°49′N 6°41′E

The Bina Footprint (or Dauda Woyaba) is a small tourist attraction in Lapai, Nigeria showing a footprint on top of a rock.

== Local history ==
According to the local legend, it is a footprint of a man called Dabo in a small village 3 km from Muye area, Niger State.

In a report it is stated that Dabo stepped on top of the rock with his left foot on his way from Bina Village to Gulu area to perform ablution for prayers, and later he migrated to Kano, but before he left, he built a Mosque at the place and lives in there for some time before leaving to another geographical location, and until now the print still exist on the top of the rock.
