= Okpoama Beach =

Beach in Nigeria

Okpoama beach is a beach located in Brass Local Government Area of Bayelsa State, Nigeria. The beach is often considered a recreation center for people within and outside Bayelsa State and it occupies a 23 km space.

== Okpoama Beach Festival ==
Every year, the Okpoama beach festival is organized at the Okpoama beach and it usually attracts participants from within and outside the state.
