= Bar Beach, Lagos =

Beach in Nigeria

Coordinates: 6.4220°N 3.4334°E

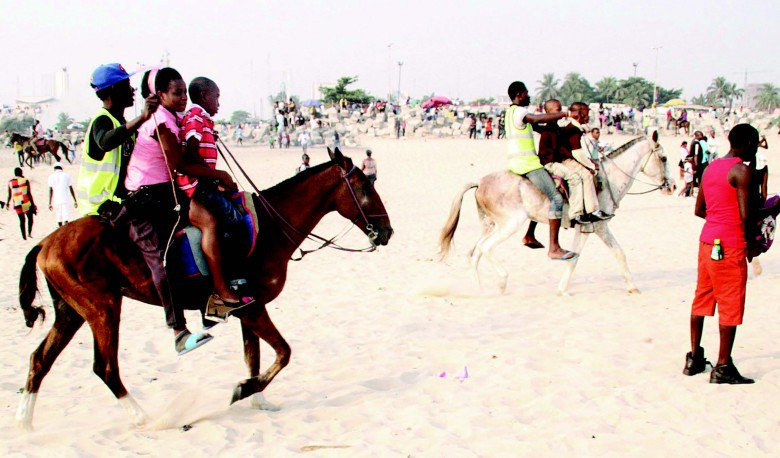
Donkey rides on Bar Beach, 2019

Bar Beach was a beach on the Atlantic Ocean along the shoreline of Lagos, situated on Victoria Island. For a time, it was the most popular beach in Nigeria especially when Lagos was the capital of the country. The beach served as a venue for social activities like family outing, picnics and for some even spiritual gatherings.

== 1970s to 1990s: Firing squad venue ==
From the early 1970s to the late eighties, during the military regime, Bar Beach was a site where many convicted armed robbers and coup plotters were executed by firing squad. It was always a public spectacle, with thousands of spectators, including television cameras and print journalists.

The first-ever public execution in Nigeria took place at Bar Beach in 1971. It was of Babatunde Folorunsho, for armed robbery. Others include Joseph Ilobo, Williams Alders Oyazimo, and Lawrence Anini and Dr. Oyenusi in the 90s.

The convicted plotters of the coup of February 1976 that killed General Murtala Mohammed, including Major-General I D Bisalla and Col. Buka Suka Dimka, were also shot by firing squad on Bar Beach.

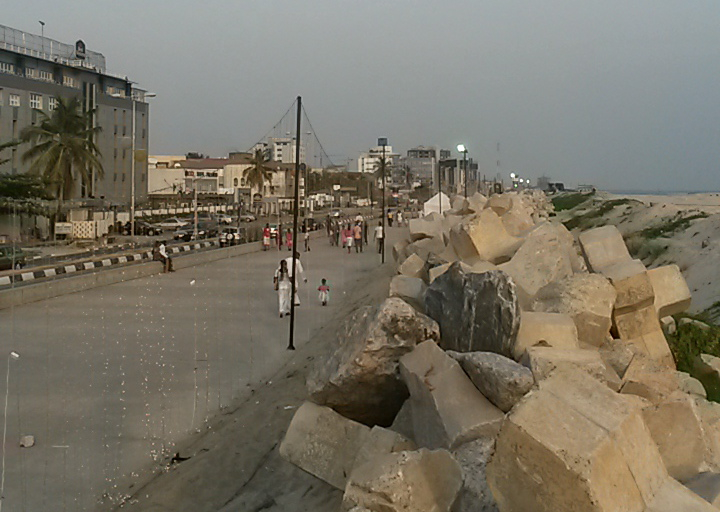
Bar Beach, Lagos, 2013

== 1980s to 2000s: Flooding ==
Over many years, Bar Beach developed a reputation for overflowing its banks and claiming lives and property. Many times, the Ahmadu Bello Way, the road closest to its banks, was closed for safety reasons. Studies showed that between eight and fourteen meters of beach-front was eroded annually along Bar Beach.

== 2000s to present: Eko Atlantic ==
In 2003, the idea for a modern city on the Atlantic coast was publicly discussed. It would be sited on what used to be Bar Beach, out of reclaimed land. It would be called Eko Atlantic City, a residential and business district “standing on 10 million square metres of land reclaimed from the ocean and protected by an 8.5 kilometre-long sea wall"

In 2008, the construction of the new city began.

As of May 2009, while the site was being dredged, about 3,000,000 cubic metres (3,900,000 cu yd) of space had been sand-filled and placed in the reclamation area, while about 35,000 tonnes of rock have been delivered to the site.

In 2016, Eko Atlantic City was commissioned by Lagos governor Akinwumi Ambode.

== Eko Atlantic and continuing flooding ==
The Eko Atlantic project has been criticized for having a design flaw that may contribute to continuing flooding in Lagos because of its being "highly susceptible to rising tides, as it is based on an artificial sandbar directly adjacent to the ocean." A storm surge in the exact area where the Eko Atlantic's construction was taking place reportedly killed 16 people. There have been other equally dangerous flooding in Lagos blamed on the new construction project.

== In popular culture ==
Nnedi Okorafor's 2014 novel Lagoon is set in an alternative 2010, where Bar Beach is still a thriving entertainment district and the site of first contact between humans and extraterrestrial visitors.

== Environmental and climate issues ==
The Lagos bar beach has faced several environmental issues and climatic issues over the years. Prominent among those issues is consistency flooding as a result of the negative effect of the change in the earth`s climate. In order to contain the flooding, erosion and other environmental issues around the beach, the Federal Government of Nigeria, has for the last forty years, spent over thirty billion naira on several projects aimed at improving the environment.

== See also ==
- maroko, Lagos
- Eti-Osa
- Ibeno Beach
