= Lawrence Anini =

Nigerian bandit (c. 1960–1987)

- Born: Lawrence Anini; 1960; Benin City, Edo State, Nigeria
- Died: 29 March 1987; Benin City, Edo State, Nigeria
- Cause of death: Execution by firing squad
- Other names: The Law; Ovbigbo
- Children: 2
- Convictions: Armed Robbery and Firearms
- Penalty: Death
- Accomplices: Monday Osunbor, Friday Ofege, Smallie, Henry Ekponwan, Eweka and Alhaji Zed Zed

Lawrence Nomanyagbon Anini (c. 1960 – 29 March 1987) was a Nigerian bandit who terrorised Benin City in the 1980s along with his sidekick, Monday Osunbor. He was captured and executed for his crimes.

== Arrest ==
On 3 December 1986, he was caught at a house in Benin City between 2nd and 3rd East Circular Road in the company of a girlfriend. His girlfriend was said to have betrayed him. His friends were arrested while he was shot in the leg, transferred to a military hospital. Several days after he was shot in the leg, one of his legs was amputated. The country's military leader, Ibrahim Babangida, demanded a speedy trial. Anini was convicted of most of his charges and was executed on 29 March 1987, in Benin city.
