= Sir Lugard Empire Hill =

Historical radio station in Nigeria

- Baro
- Broadcast area: Northern Nigeria
- Frequency: HF

Programming
- Language: English

Ownership
- Owner: Fredrick Lugard
- Operator: Lugard civil servant

History
- First air date: 1900
- Last air date: 1958

Technical information
- Power: 25 Kilowatts

Baro Empire Hill or Sir Lugard Empire Hill is a 150 m ground level hill, tourist and location of the Colonial Nigeria high frequency radio station that was installed by Sir Fredrick Lugard at Baro, Nigeria.

== History ==
The 110 years Radio station is a 25 kilowatt solid state analogue transmitter a high frequency radio and the hill was where the colony masters built their administrative residents for middle level staff including military and civilians cemetery and playing ground of the colonial workers who died during their service, although Sir Lugard respectively used caravan in climbing the hill while his soldiers trek.

Baro Empire Hill
- Location within Nigeria

Highest point
- Elevation: 150 m (490 ft)
- Coordinates: 8°35′N 6°25′E

Geography
- Location: Nigeria

The hill has a view from River Niger 15 km to the river and remains the Sir Lugard first head office at the summit. The station was where he communicated with Queen Elizabeth and others. The hill is a historical place and attracts attention from across the country.

The Hill is 12 km away from the Baro Port, a port that is used for transportation of goods by the colony masters in that days and the river flows through the River Niger forming hinterland with railway that links to many terminus and also warehouse that goods is store by business people from other countries.
