= Agodi Gardens =

Garden in Ibadan, Oyo state

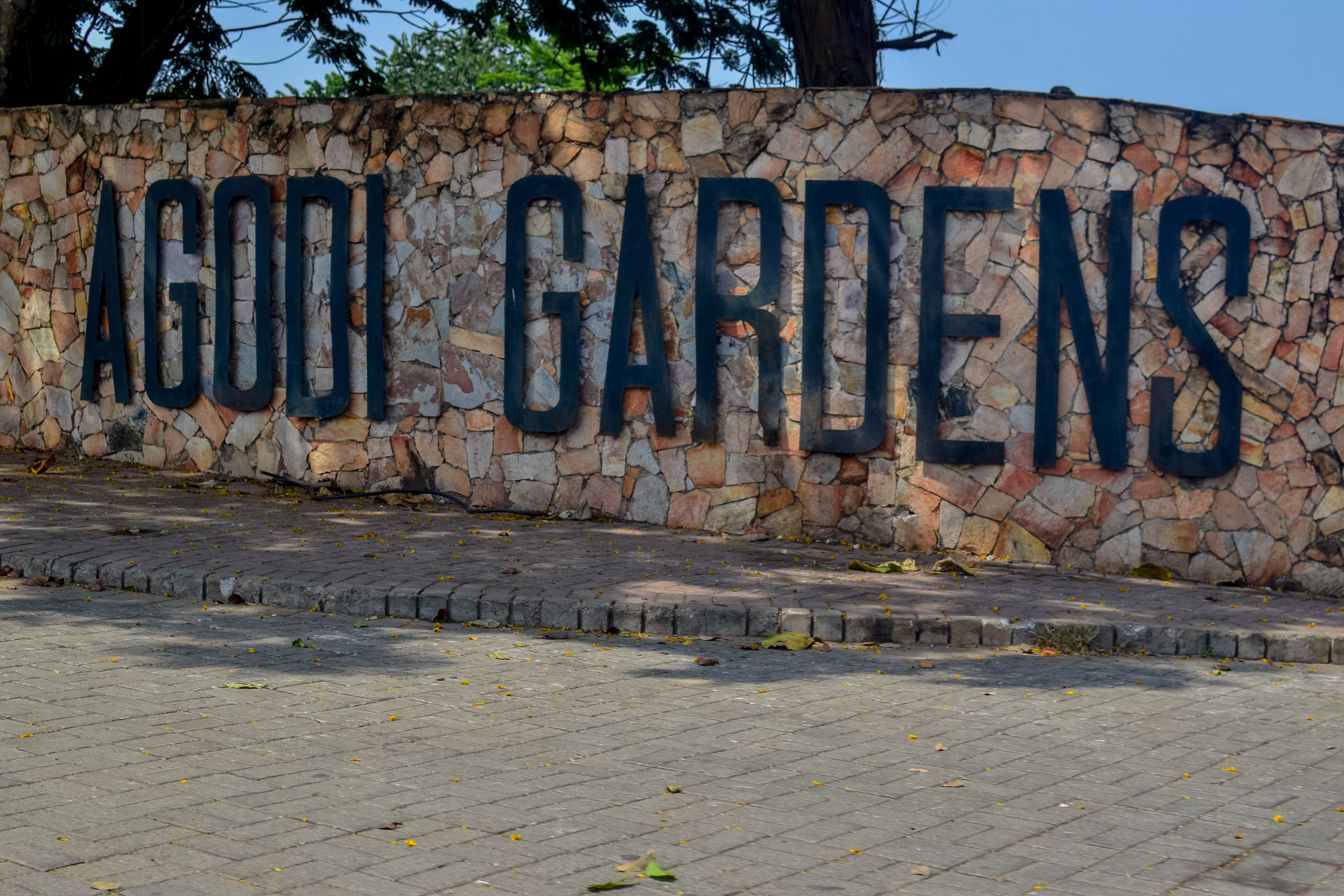
- Interactive map of Agodi Gardens
- Location: Ibadan, Oyo State, Nigeria
- Coordinates: 7°24′25″N 3°53′57″E
- Area: 61 hectares (150 acres)
- Established: 1967
- Governing body: Bureau of Investment Promotion and Public Private Partnerships (BIP/PPP)

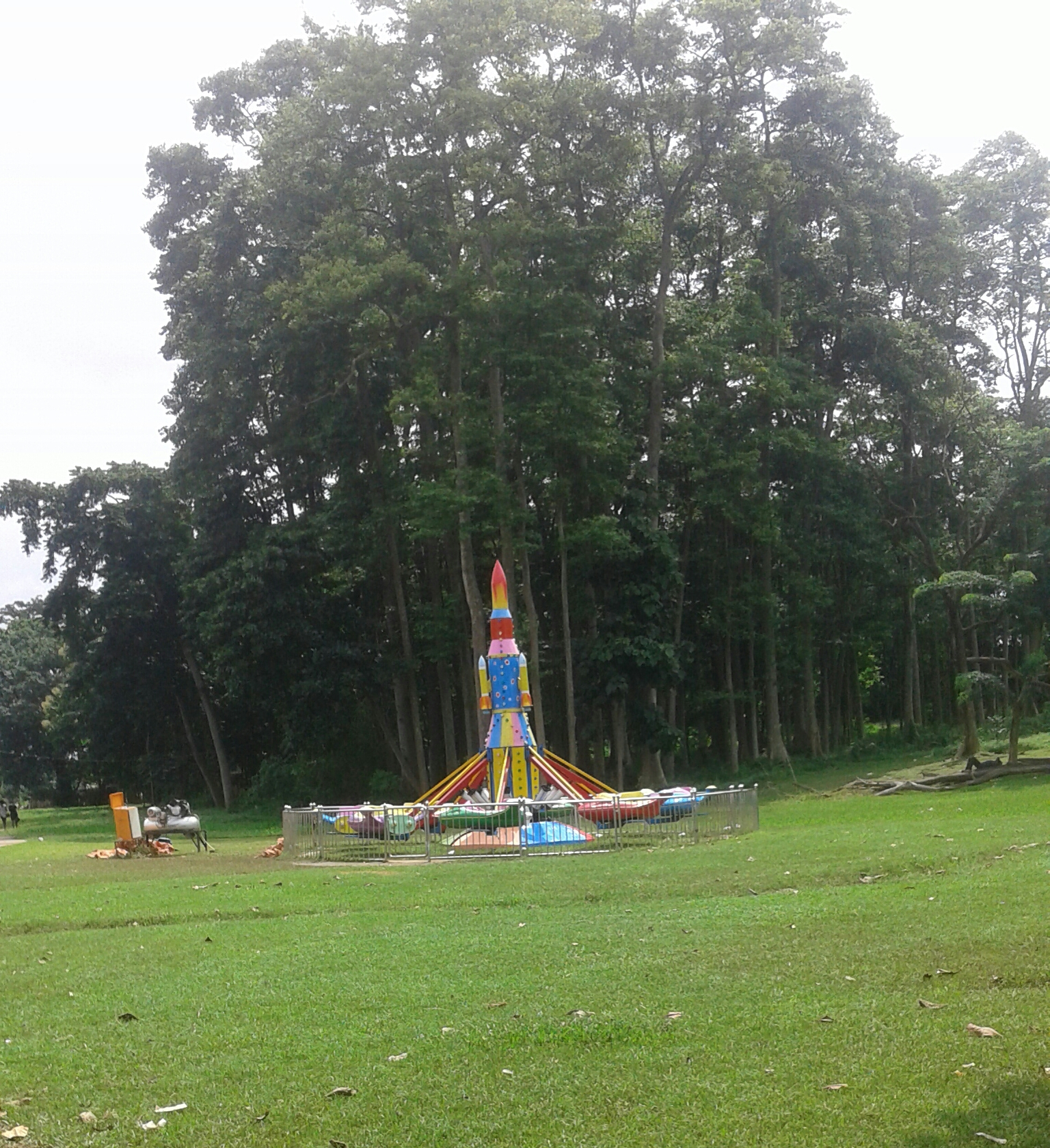
Agodi Garden, Ibadan

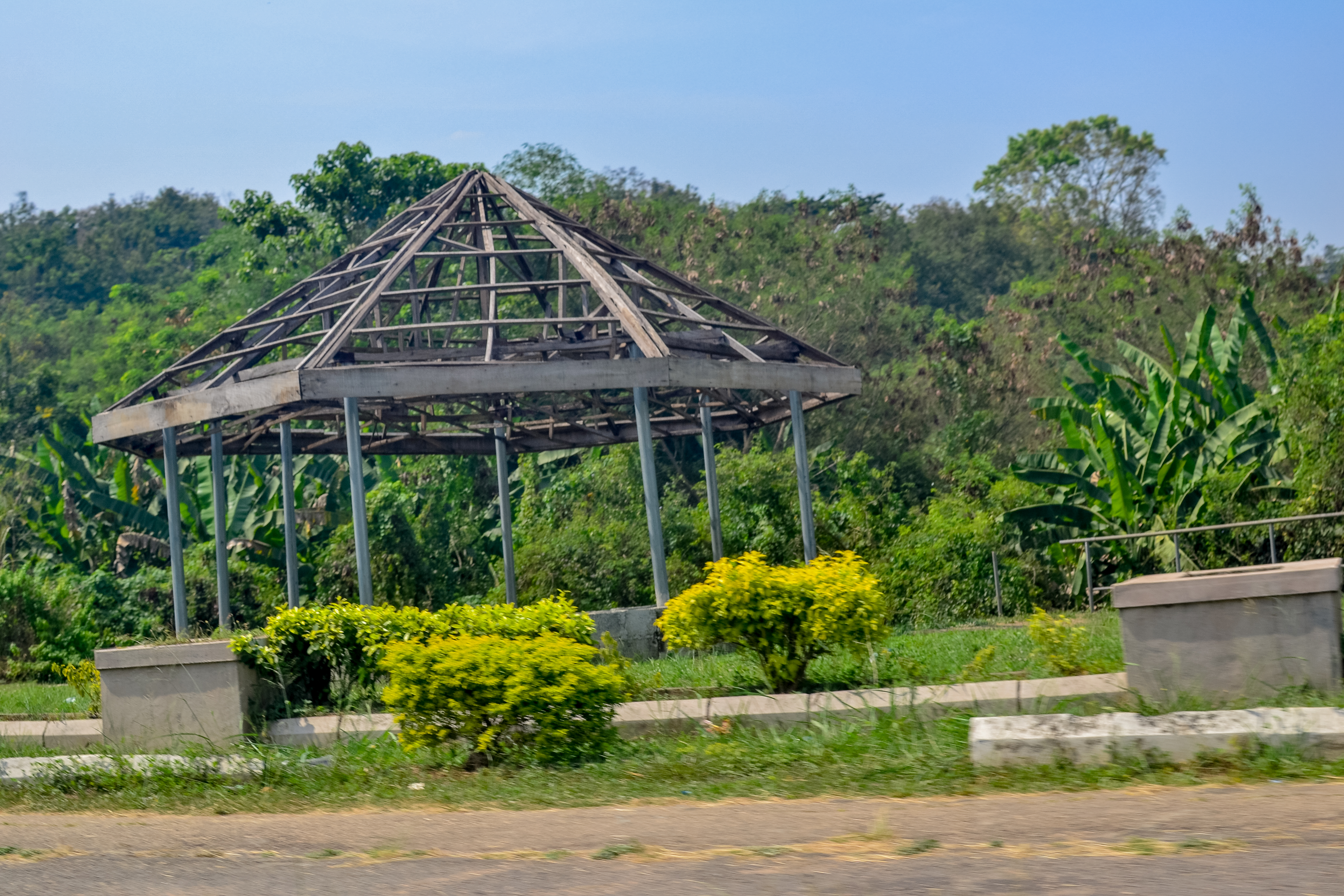
Agodi Gardens, Ibadan

Agodi Gardens is a tourist attraction in the city of Ibadan, Oyo state, Nigeria. Also called Agodi Botanical Gardens, Agodi Gardens, Ibadan, the gardens sit on 61 ha (730,000 yd^{2}) of land

It offers a green space with a zoo. Visitors can observe animals like turtles, monkeys, and peacocks. It serves as a peaceful retreat for both locals and tourists. It’s a space that combines nature, fun, and culture all in one.

== History ==
Agodi Gardens, was the Agodi Zoological and Botanical Gardens.

== Attractions ==
- Water park
- Lake
- Mini zoo
- Play area and rides for children
- Picnic and Gardens area

== Lion attack ==
In late September 2017, a zookeeper at the Agodi Zoo was attacked by a lion. The zookeeper attacked by the lion was Hamzat Oyekunle. The zoo was closed immediately by the Oyo State Government.
