= Erin-Ijesha Waterfalls =

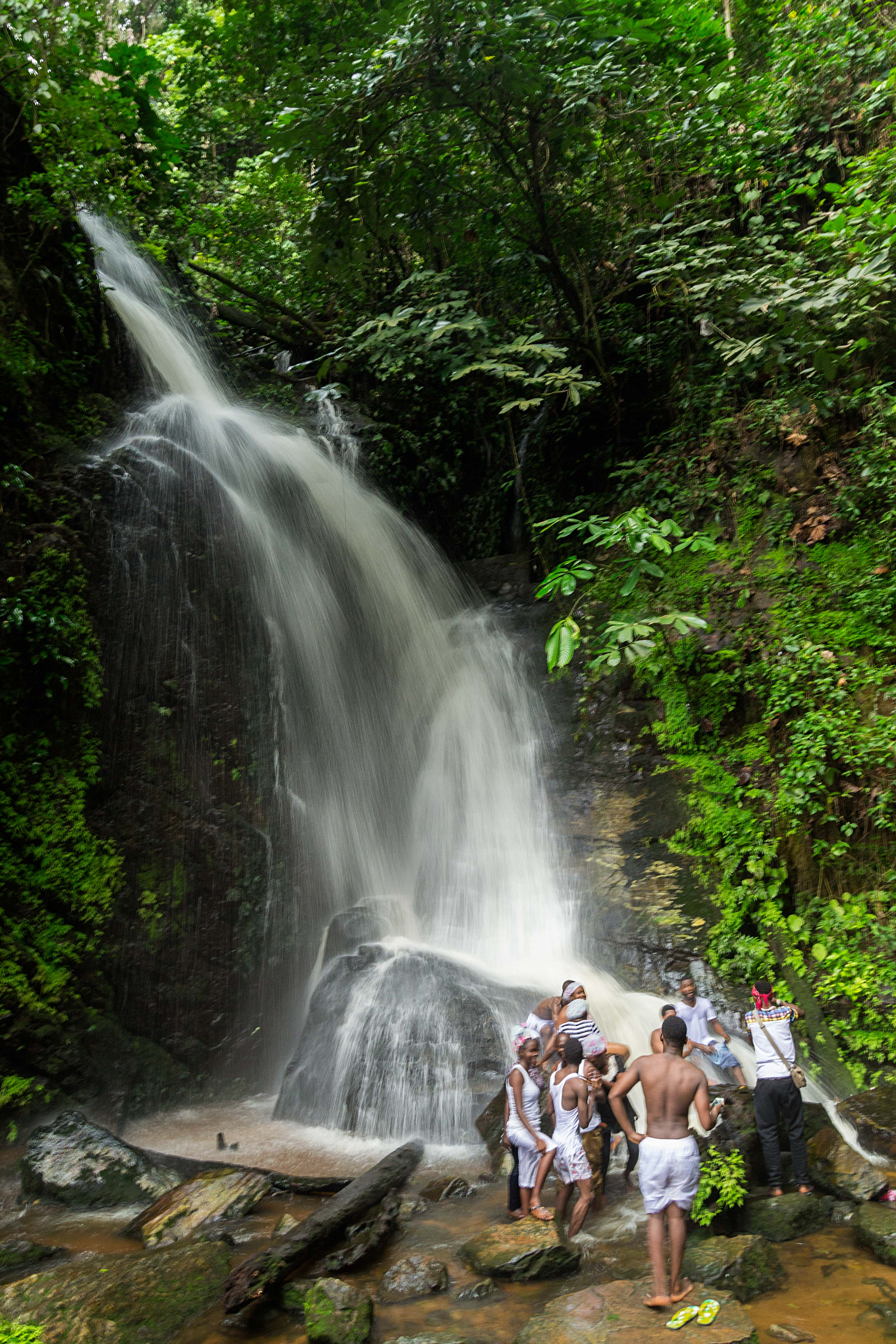
- Tourists at Erin Ijesa (Olumirin) falls, Osun state, Nigeria
- Interactive map of Erin-Ijesha Waterfalls

Erin-Ijesha Waterfalls level 2 video

Tourists at Olumirin falls at Erin Ijesha, Osun state

Erin-Ijesha Waterfalls (also known as Olumirin waterfalls) is a waterfall site in Erin-odo, Osun State, Nigeria. It is a tourist attraction located in the Oriade local government area. According to The Nation, the waterfall was discovered by hunters in 1140 AD. However, local tradition has it that the waterfall was discovered by a woman called Akinla, founder of Erin-Ijesa town and a granddaughter of Oduduwa, during the migration of Ife people to Erin-Ijesa. Akinla then named it Olumirin, an elision of oluwa mirin which in Yoruba means "another god".

The fall features seven levels, on top of which the village Abake is located. Abake village shares boundary with Ẹfọ̀n-Alààyè in Ekiti State.

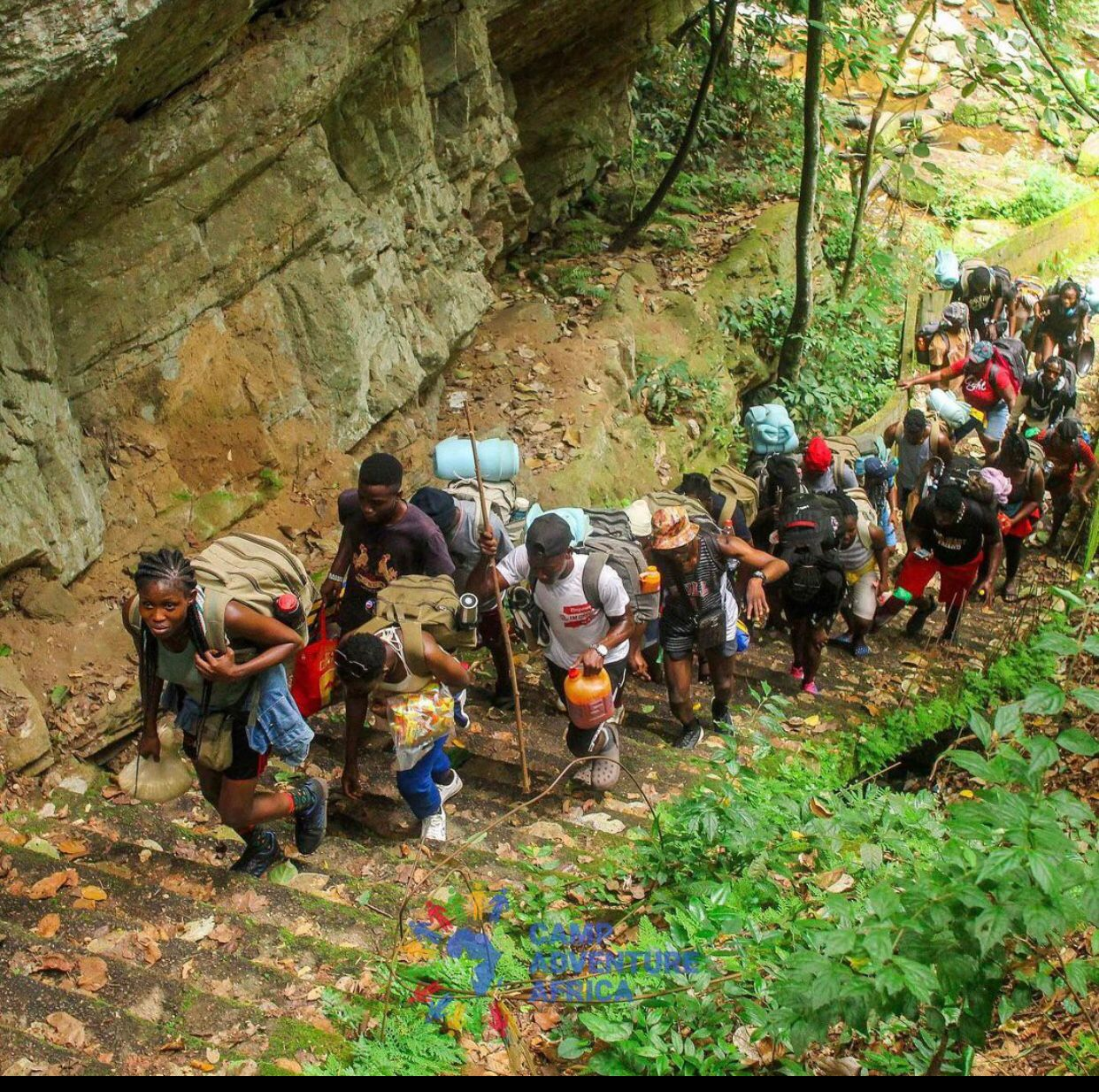
Hikers at Erin-odo WaterFalls

The Erin-odo Waterfalls is a popular excursion point for schools around the neighbourhood. The natives regard the waterfall as a sacred site and a means of purifying their souls. Festivals were formerly celebrated and sacrifices performed at the site.

== See also ==
- List of waterfalls
- Ikogosi Warm Springs
