= Ibeno Beach =

Public beach and amusement park

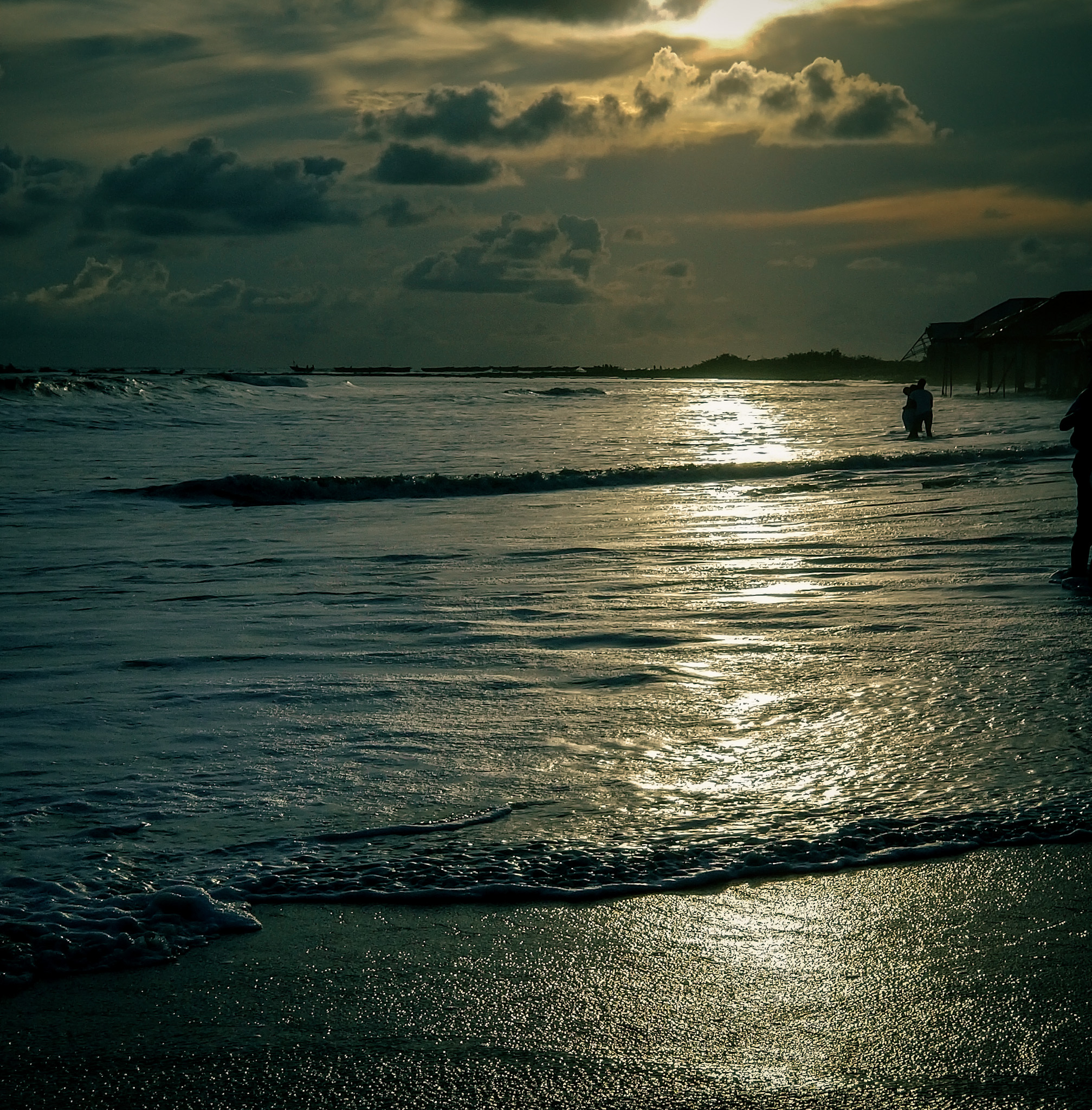
Sunset in Ibeno

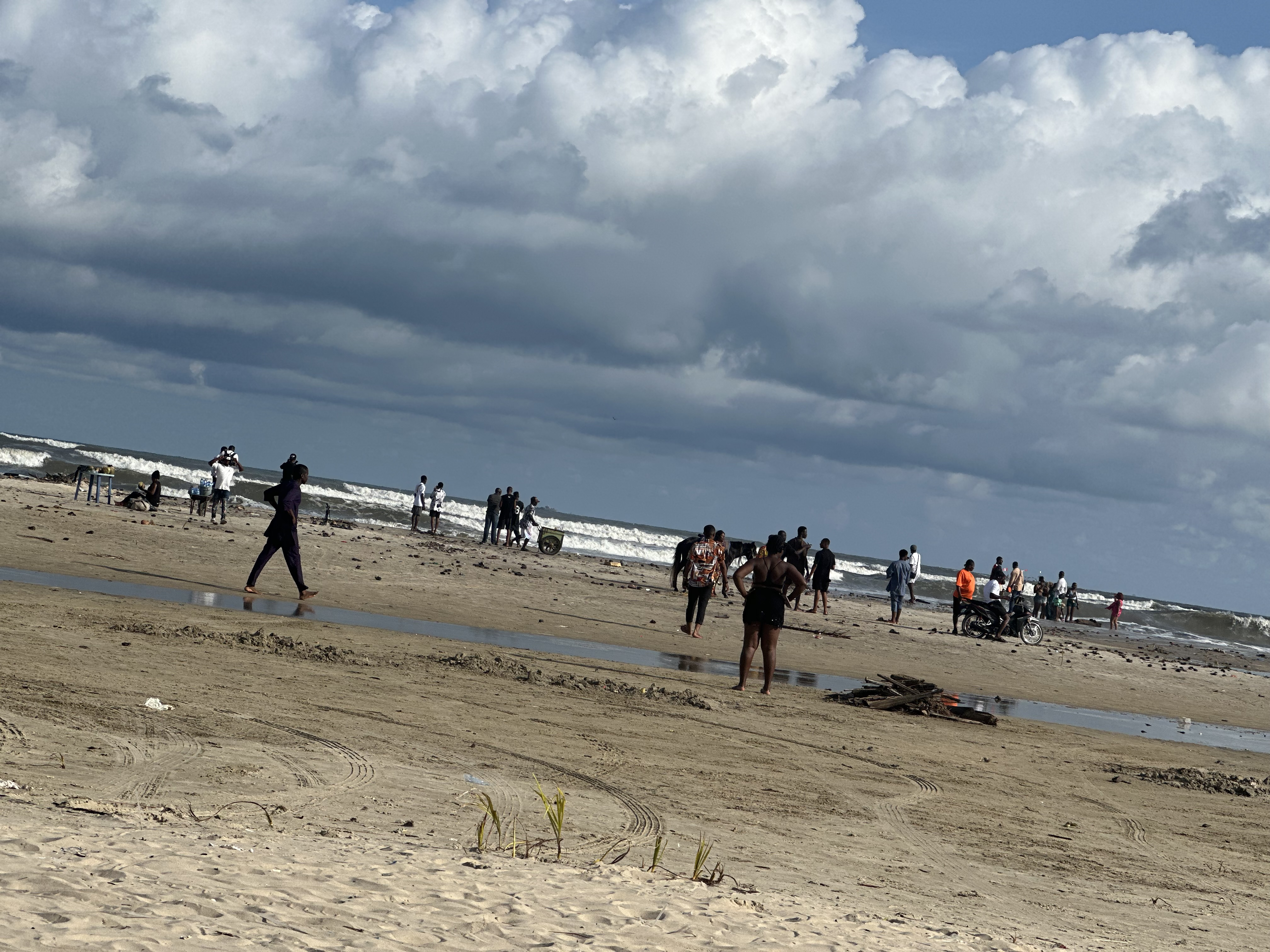
Everyday life experience at Ibeno beach

The Ibeno Beach is one of the beaches on the Atlantic Ocean along the shorelines of Ibeno in Akwa Ibom State, Nigeria. It is the longest sand beach in West Africa Qua Iboe River estuary is the major estuary in Ibeno Beach. Ibeno Beach stretches for about 30 kilometres from Ibeno to James Town along the Atlantic coastline of Akwa Ibom State in Nigeria. It is the best tourist site in Akwa Ibom State. With its beautiful coastline, Ibeno provides endless natural facilities for tourism, water sporting, beach soccer and general boating.

== Location ==
Ibeno beach is located in Ibeno, a local government area of Akwa Ibom State in southeastern Nigeria, which it is named after. The beach is one of the tourist attractions in Nigeria. In June 2010, there was a report of oil spill on the beach.

== Tourism ==
Ibeno beach is one of the major tourist attractions in Akwa Ibom State. It has a golf course sited, managed and used by Exxonmobil, though in recent times, it's been abandoned. Every December 26th, the beach receives tourists and holiday makers in thousands who participate in the annual beach party.

== See also ==
- Bar Beach, Lagos
- List of Beaches in Nigeria
