= Port Harcourt Tourist Beach =

Urban beach in Port Harcourt, Nigeria

- Beach
- Location within Nigeria
- Coordinates: 4°45′34″N 7°00′44″E
- Location: Port Harcourt, Nigeria
- Creation: 1988

The Port Harcourt Tourist Beach is a white sand urban beach in Port Harcourt, Rivers State, Nigeria, created in 1988. It is located along Kolabi Creek, east of the Old Township district, and about 235 kilometres (146 miles) from Kribi in Cameroon.

The beach is designed to cater for the recreational needs of everyone, especially young people. It is visited by both tourists and residents, and it is one of the most popular beaches in Port Harcourt.

One of its advantages is that it is located on the edge of the city, such that after spending the day on the beach, visitors can visit any of the numerous hotels and restaurants to have dinner and also enjoy the city's night life. They can also take a walk through the hiking trails. The beach was created to have a serene environment for tourists and visitors who can enjoy the white sands and waves.

== Activities ==
The Port Harcourt tourist beach has played host to several tourists and visitors from various parts of the world who visited the beach in the past, especially during the annual cultural fiesta of the state, popularly known as CARNIRIV, to watch the glamorous and exciting boat regatta organised by the Rivers State Tourism Development Agency (RSTDA).

The Port Harcourt tourist beach which was once a tourist's attraction has gradually lost its past glory, charm and pride of place due to the dilapidated infrastructure, lack of modern facilities, poor sanitary condition and so on. This poor state of the beach has led to lack of patronage and loss of revenue for the state.
