= Agbokim Waterfalls =

Waterfall in Nigeria

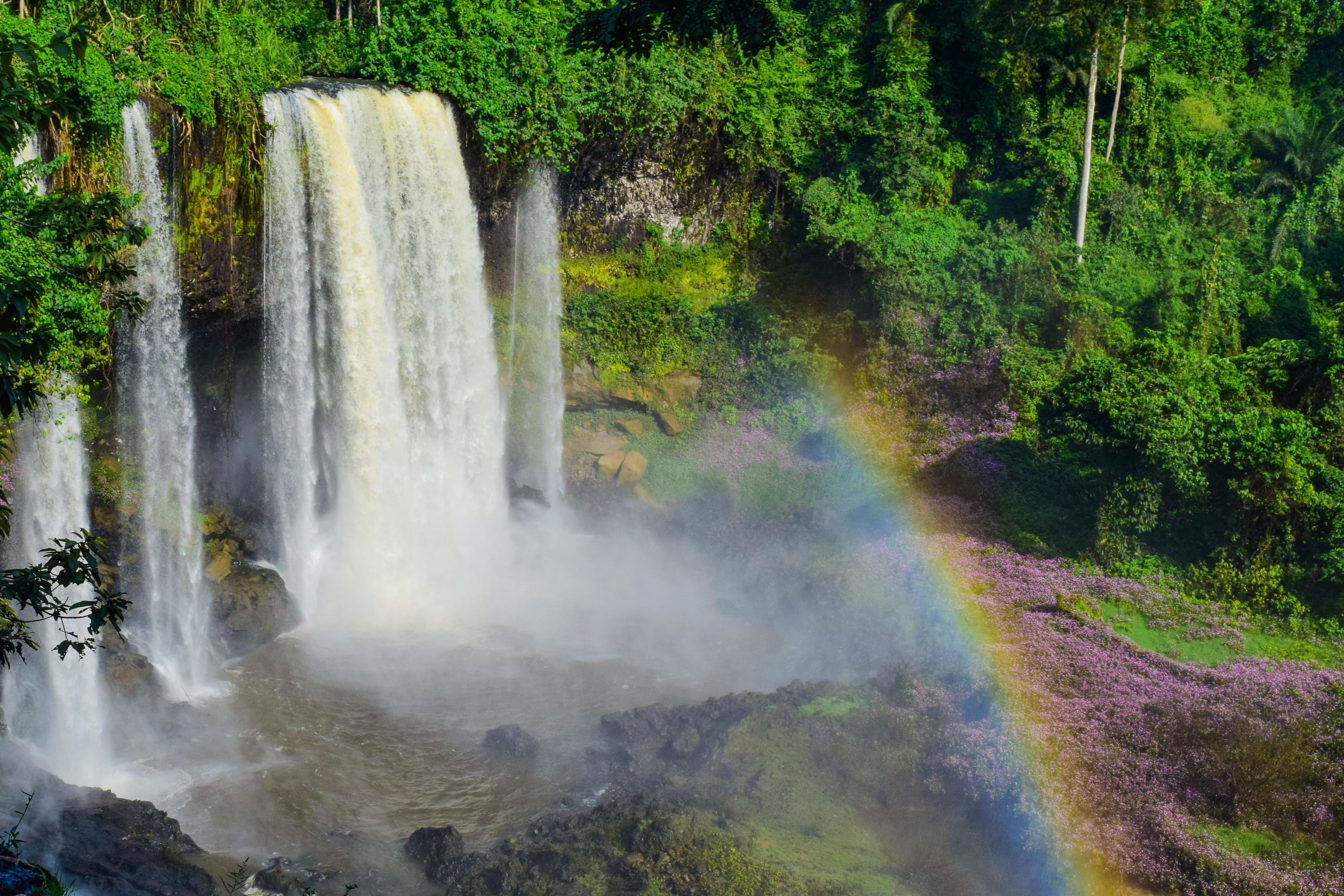
- Agbokim Waterfalls, Ikom, Nigeria

- Location within Nigeria
- Coordinates: 5°54′25″N 8°54′46″E
- Number of drops: 7
- Longest drop: 75 metres (246 feet)

Agbokim waterfalls are situated in the Etung local government area of Cross River State in the South-South (Niger delta) region of Nigeria, very close to its border with Cameroon. The waterfalls are about 25 km (16 mi) from Ikom and 240 km (150 mi) from Calabar.

Agbokim Waterfall is made up of seven streams with a cascade of fresh water plunging down the high cliff into the tropical rainforest. It is also a tourist attraction in Cross River State.

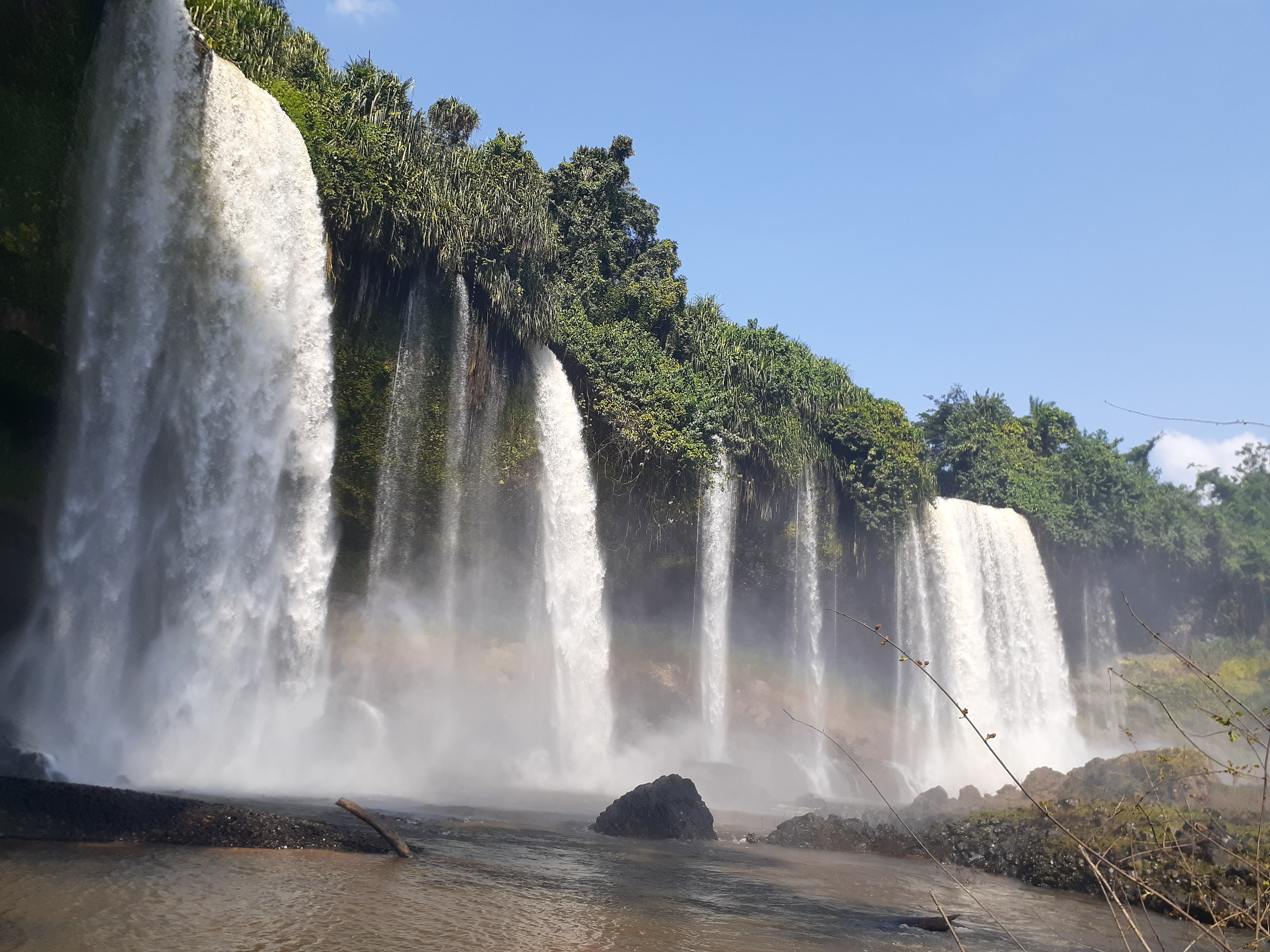
Agbokim waterfalls

== History ==
The early 1900s marked the beginning of the history of the Agbokim Waterfalls area, when a hunter by the name of Ntankum brought his families and other older Inaku people who had previously lived in a mountainous area to live there. An indigenous storyteller described how Ntakum and his son settled in the region known as Agbokim waterfalls, where there are all Ejagham people who are thought to have moved from Inagu. Between Cameroon and the Agbokim Waterfalls in Nigeria's Cross River State, they created the intricate river system. As they congregated and shared in common with one another, they conducted hunting study and discovered food crops, a forest for hunting, and water that could be boiled to make salt.

Agbokim waterfalls have grown and developed for a very long time, long before tourism development. Since the river's source is dead plant and animal remains, members of the Agbokim community collaborate to make the water falls a developed region by opposing deforestation and promoting afforestation. They contribute to afforestation, which aids in raising the amount of water. The neighborhood's water falls region serves as a prominent destination for tourists since it serves as a location of enjoyment and relaxation.

== See also ==
- List of waterfalls
- Ikom monoliths
- Obudu Mountain Resort
