= Gratiana =

Gratiana may refer to:

- Gratiana, Africa, a former Roman city and bishopric in Byzacena, now a Latin Catholic titular see
- Gratiana (beetle), a genus of tortoise beetles
- Gratiana Chanter (1857–1934), English writer
- Gratiana, a fictional character in the 1629 James Shirley play The Wedding

== See also ==
- Gratian(us), the male equivalent in Latin
- Gratianopolis (disambiguation)
