= Mary Kingsley =

English ethnographer, scientific writer and explorer (1862–1900)

Mary Henrietta Kingsley
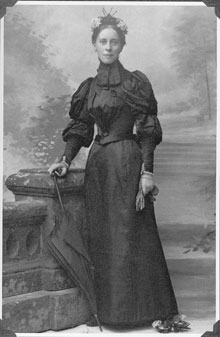
- Mary Kingsley, photographed in the 1890s
- Born: 13 October 1862; Islington, London, England
- Died: 3 June 1900 (aged 37); Simon's Town, Cape Colony
- Occupations: Explorer; travel writer; ethnographic writer
- Writing career
- Genre: Travel literature
- Subject: West Africa
- Notable works: Travels in West Africa (1897); West African Studies (1899)

Mary Henrietta Kingsley (13 October 1862 – 3 June 1900) was an English explorer, travel writer, and ethnographic observer known for her journeys through West Africa and for her influential writings on African societies and colonial policy. Between 1893 and 1895 she travelled widely in regions of present-day Sierra Leone, Angola, Gabon, and Cameroon, often journeying alone in areas rarely visited by Europeans. During these expeditions she collected zoological specimens for the British Museum and documented local religious practices, social customs, and political systems.

Kingsley published two widely-read books, Travels in West Africa (1897) and West African Studies (1899), which combined travel narrative with ethnographic observation and commentary on British imperial policy. Her writings made her one of the most prominent European commentators on West Africa at the end of the 19th century.

== Early life ==
Kingsley was born in Islington, London on 13 October 1862, the daughter and oldest child of physician, traveller and writer George Kingsley and Mary Bailey. She came from a family of writers, as she was also the niece of novelists Charles Kingsley and Henry Kingsley. The family moved to Highgate less than a year after her birth, the same home where her brother Charles George R. ("Charley") Kingsley was born in 1866; in 1879 they moved to Bexleyheath in Kent and in 1886 to Cambridge.

Her father was a physician and worked for George Herbert, 13th Earl of Pembroke and other aristocrats and was frequently away from home traveling. During these voyages he collected information for his studies. Dr. Kingsley accompanied Lord Dunraven on a trip to North America from 1870 to 1875. During the trip, Dr. Kingsley was invited to accompany United States Army officer George Armstrong Custer's expedition against the Sioux. The subsequent Battle of the Little Bighorn terrified the Kingsley family, but they were relieved to learn that bad weather had kept Dr. Kingsley from joining Custer. It is possible that her father's views on the brutal treatment of Native Americans in the United States helped shape Mary's later opinions on European colonialism in West Africa.

Mary Kingsley had little formal schooling compared to her brother, other than German lessons at a young age; because, at that time and at her level of society, education was not thought to be necessary for a girl. She did, however, have access to her father's large library and loved to hear his stories of foreign countries. She did not enjoy novels that were deemed more appropriate for young ladies of the time, such as those by Jane Austen or Charlotte Brontë, but she preferred books on the sciences and memoirs of explorers. In 1886, Charley entered Christ's College, Cambridge, to read law; this allowed Mary to make several academic connections and a few friends.

There is little indication that Kingsley was raised Christian; instead, she was a self-proclaimed believer with, "summed up in her own words [...] 'an utter faith in God'" and even identified strongly with what was described as 'the African religion'. She is known for criticizing Christian missionaries and their work for supplanting pre-existing African cultures without proving any material benefits in return.

The 1891 England census finds Mary's mother and her two children living at 7 Mortimer Road, Cambridge, where Charles is recorded as a BA student at law and Mary as a student of medicine. In her later years, Kingsley's mother became ill, and she was expected to care for her well-being. Unable to leave her mother's side, she was limited in her travel opportunities. Soon, her father was also bedridden with rheumatic fever following an excursion. Kingsley's father died in February 1892, and her mother died in April. Their deaths left her an inheritance of £8,600, to be divided equally with her brother. At age 29, with her family obligations ended and financial independence secured, she was finally able to travel.

== Travels in Africa ==
After a preliminary visit to the Canary Islands in 1892, Kingsley decided to travel to the west coast of Africa in August 1893. Generally, the only non-African women who embarked on (often dangerous) journeys to Africa were the wives of missionaries, government officials, or explorers. Exploration had not been seen as a fitting role for English women, though this was changing under the influence of figures such as Isabella Bird and Marianne North. African women were surprised that a woman of Kingsley's age was travelling without a man, and she was frequently asked why her husband was not accompanying her.

Kingsley landed in Sierra Leone on 17 August 1893 and from there travelled to Luanda, Angola. She lived with local people, who taught her necessary survival skills for the wilderness, acted as luggage porters and guides for her travels, and gave her advice. She often went into dangerous areas alone. Her training as a nurse at the Kaiserswerther Diakonie had prepared her for slight injuries and jungle maladies that she would later encounter.

Kingsley returned to England via Liverpool in December 1893. Upon her return, Kingsley secured support and aid from Dr. Albert Günther, a prominent zoologist at the British Museum, as well as a writing agreement with publisher George Macmillan, for she wished to publish her travel accounts.

She sailed to Africa again from 23 December 1894 with more support and supplies from England and in the company of Ethel MacDonald. She longed to study "cannibal" people and their traditional religious practices, commonly referred to as "fetish" during the Victorian era. In April she met Scottish missionary Mary Slessor, another European woman living among native African populations with little company and no husband. It was during her meeting with Slessor that Kingsley first became aware of the custom of twin killing, a custom which Slessor was determined to stop. The native people believed that one of the twins was the offspring of the devil who had secretly mated with the mother and since the innocent child was impossible to distinguish, both were killed and the mother was often killed as well for attracting the devil to impregnate her. Kingsley arrived at Slessor's residence shortly after she had taken in a recent mother of twins and her surviving child.

In May, she traveled to Gabon. There, she canoed up the Ogooué River, where she collected specimens of fish previously unknown to western science, three of which were later named after her. In August she visited Corisco Island. After meeting the Fang people and travelling through uncharted Fang territory, she daringly climbed the 4,040 metres (13,250 ft) Mount Cameroon by a route not previously attempted by any other European. She moored her boat at Donguila.

== Return to England ==
When she returned home on 30 November 1895, Kingsley was greeted by journalists eager to interview her. The reports that were drummed up about her voyage, however, were most upsetting, as the papers portrayed her as a "New Woman", an image which she did not embrace. Kingsley distanced herself from any feminist movement claims, arguing that women's suffrage was "a minor question; while there was a most vital section of men disenfranchised women could wait". Her consistent lack of identification with women's rights movements may be attributed to a number of causes, such as the attempt to ensure that her work would be received more favorably; in fact, some insist this might be a direct reference to her belief in the importance of securing rights for British traders in West Africa.

Over the next three years, she toured England, giving lectures about life in Africa to a wide array of audiences. She was the first woman to address the Liverpool and Manchester chambers of commerce. Kingsley upset the Church of England when she criticised missionaries for attempting to convert the people of Africa and corrupt their religions. In this regard, she discussed many aspects of African life that were shocking to English people, including polygamy, which she argued was practiced out of necessity. After living with the African people, Kingsley became directly aware how their societies functioned and how prohibiting customs such as polygamy would be detrimental to their way of life. She knew that the typical African wives had too many tasks to manage alone. Missionaries in Africa often required converted men to abandon all but one of their wives, leaving the other women and children without the support of a husband – thus creating immense social and economic problems. Kingsley's also criticised teetotal missionaries, suggesting that those who drank small quantities of alcohol had better survival rates.

Kingsley's beliefs about cultural and economic imperialism are complex and widely debated by scholars today. Though, on the one hand, she regarded African people and cultures as those who needed protection and preservation, she also believed in the necessity of indirect rule and the adoption of European culture and technology by indigenous populations, insisting that there was some work in West Africa that had to be completed by white men. Yet in Studies in West Africa she writes: "Although a Darwinian to the core, I doubt if evolution in a neat and tidy perpendicular line, with Fetish at the bottom and Christianity at the top, represents the true state of affairs." Other, more acceptable, beliefs were variously perceived and used in Western European society – by traders, colonists, women's rights activists and others – and, articulated as they were in great style, helped shape popular perception of "the African" and "his" land.

== Writing and publications ==
Kingsley wrote two books based on her travels in West Africa: Travels in West Africa (1897) and West African Studies (1899). Travels in West Africa was an immediate commercial success and brought her wide public attention, while both works established her reputation among scholars and commentators interested in African societies and colonial policy.

Some newspapers declined to review her work. The Times, under its pro-imperialist editor Flora Shaw, refused to publish a review of Travels in West Africa. Scholars have sometimes attributed this reception to Kingsley's criticism of aspects of missionary activity and colonial policy. However, Kingsley supported the activities of European traders in West Africa and advocated systems of indirect rule, positions that complicate simple interpretations of her views as anti-imperialist.

Travels in West Africa was widely noted for its humour, detailed observation, and lively narrative style. Although often presented as an adventure narrative, Kingsley describes her purpose in more scholarly terms, "My motive for going to West Africa was study; this study was that of native ideas and practices in religion and law." She explains that the project was also intended to complete research begun by her father, whose work had been left unfinished at his death. Kingsley later wrote that her father’s work had seemed to promise "a career of great brilliancy and distinction – a promise which, unfortunately, was never entirely fulfilled".

Reflecting on her approach to writing about the people she encountered, Kingsley emphasises the importance of portraying individuals sympathetically. "It is merely that I have the power of bringing out in my fellow-creatures, white or black, their virtues, in a way honourable to them and fortunate for me."

Kingsley's books combine travel narrative with ethnographic observation and commentary on West African societies, religion, and colonial administration. Through these works she became one of the most widely read European writers on West Africa at the end of the 19th century.

== Death ==
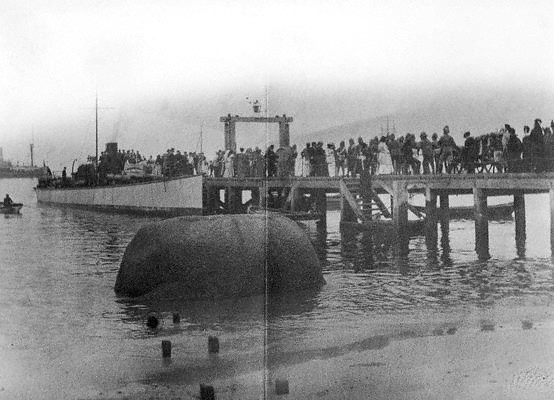
The funeral cortege of Mary Kingsley at the pier in Simonstown: 1900

After the outbreak of the Second Boer War, Kingsley travelled to Cape Town on the SS Moor in March 1900 and volunteered as a nurse. She was stationed at Simon's Town hospital, where she treated Boer prisoners of war. After contributing her services to the ill for about two months, she developed symptoms of typhoid and died on 3 June 1900. An eyewitness reported: "She rallied for a short time but realised she was going. She asked to be left to die alone, saying she did not wish anyone to see her in her weakness. Animals she said, went away to die alone."

In accordance with her wishes, she was buried at sea. "This was, I believe, the only favour and distinction that she ever asked for herself; and it was accorded with every circumstance and honour ... A party of West Yorkshires, with band before them, drew the coffin from the hospital on a gun carriage to the pier … Torpedo Boat No. 29 put to sea and, rounding Cape Point, committed her to the element in which she had chosen to be laid." "A touch of comedy, which would 'have amused' Kingsley herself, was added when the coffin refused to sink and had to be hauled back on board then thrown over again weighed down this time with an anchor."

== Legacy ==
Kingsley's tales and opinions of life in Africa helped draw attention to British imperial agendas abroad and the native customs of African people that were previously little discussed but misunderstood by people in Europe. The Fair Commerce Party formed soon after her death, pressuring for improved conditions for the natives of British colonies. The Royal African Society was founded in her memory in 1901. Various reform associations were formed in her honour and helped facilitate governmental change. The Liverpool School of Tropical Medicine founded an honorary medal in her name. In Sierra Leone, the Mary Kingsley Auditorium at the Institute of African Studies, Fourah Bay College (University of Sierra Leone), was named after her. A BBC radio documentary broadcast on 31 October 1933, presented by Clifford Collinson, commemorates her voyages.

== Published works ==
=== Books ===
- Travels in West Africa, Congo Français, Corisco and Cameroons, London: Macmillan & Co., 1897
- West African Studies, London: Macmillan & Co., 1899
- The Story of West Africa, London: Horace Marshall & Son, 1899 (The Story of the Empire Series)

=== Articles ===
- Travels on the western coast of equatorial Africa. Scottish Geographical Magazine. 12 (3): 113–124. 1896.

== Gallery ==
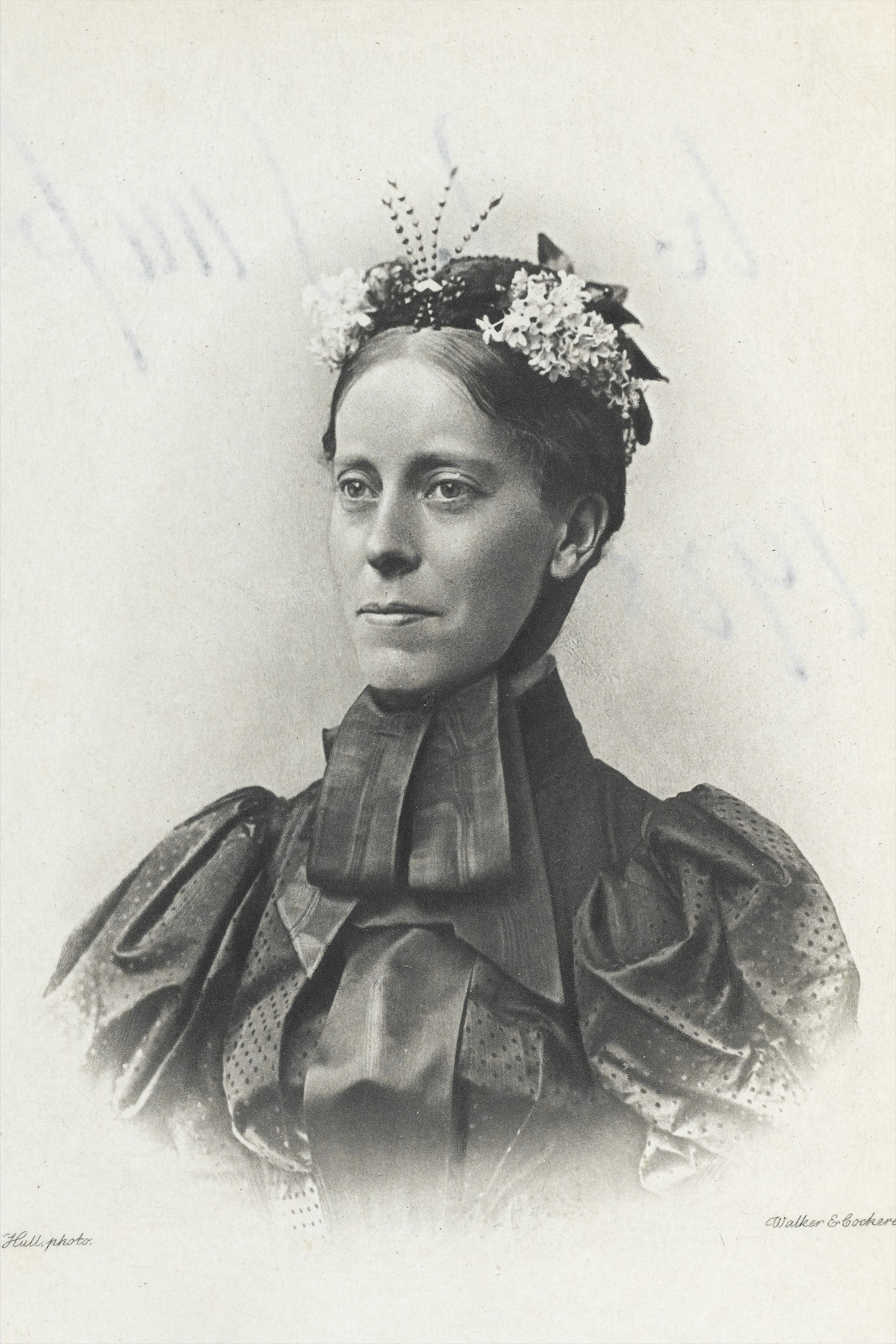
Photographic portrait from Kingsley's 1901 book West African Studies, published by Macmillan.

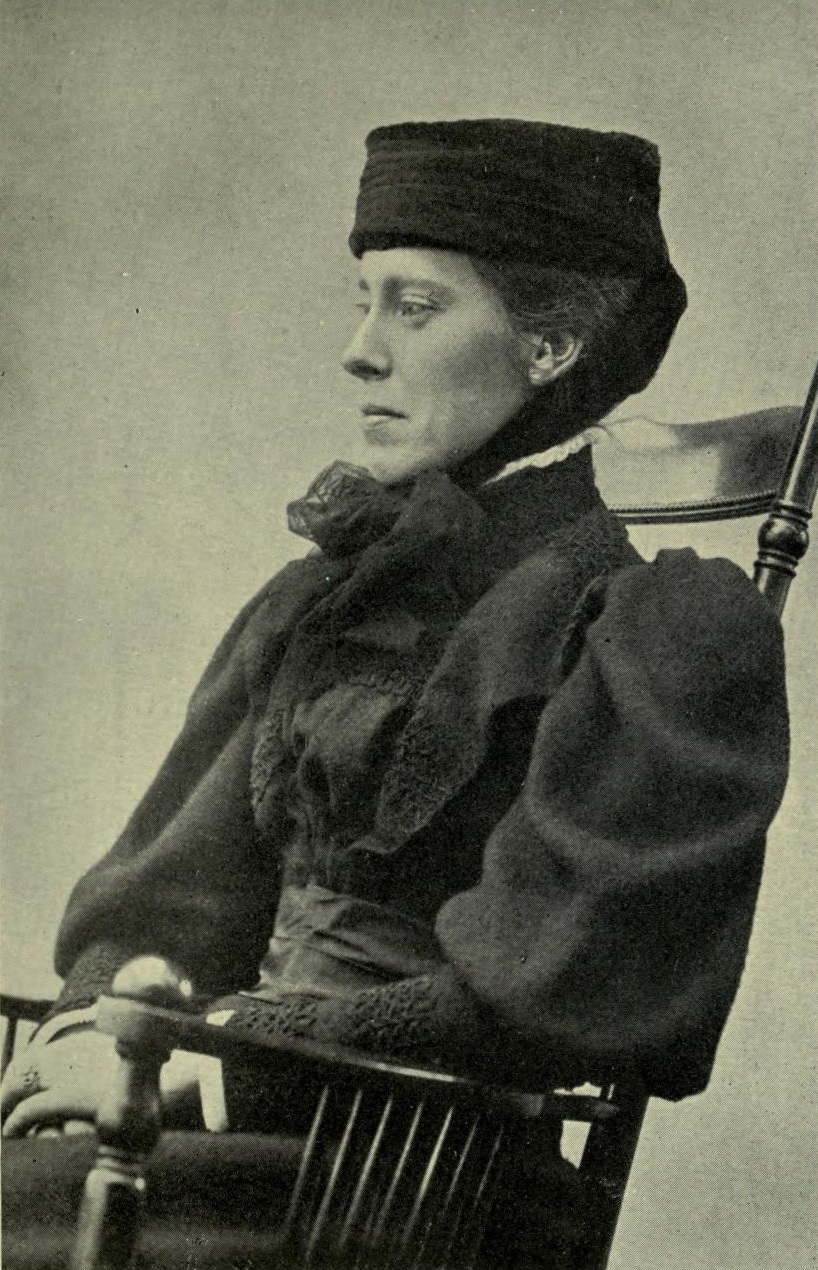
Photographic portrait

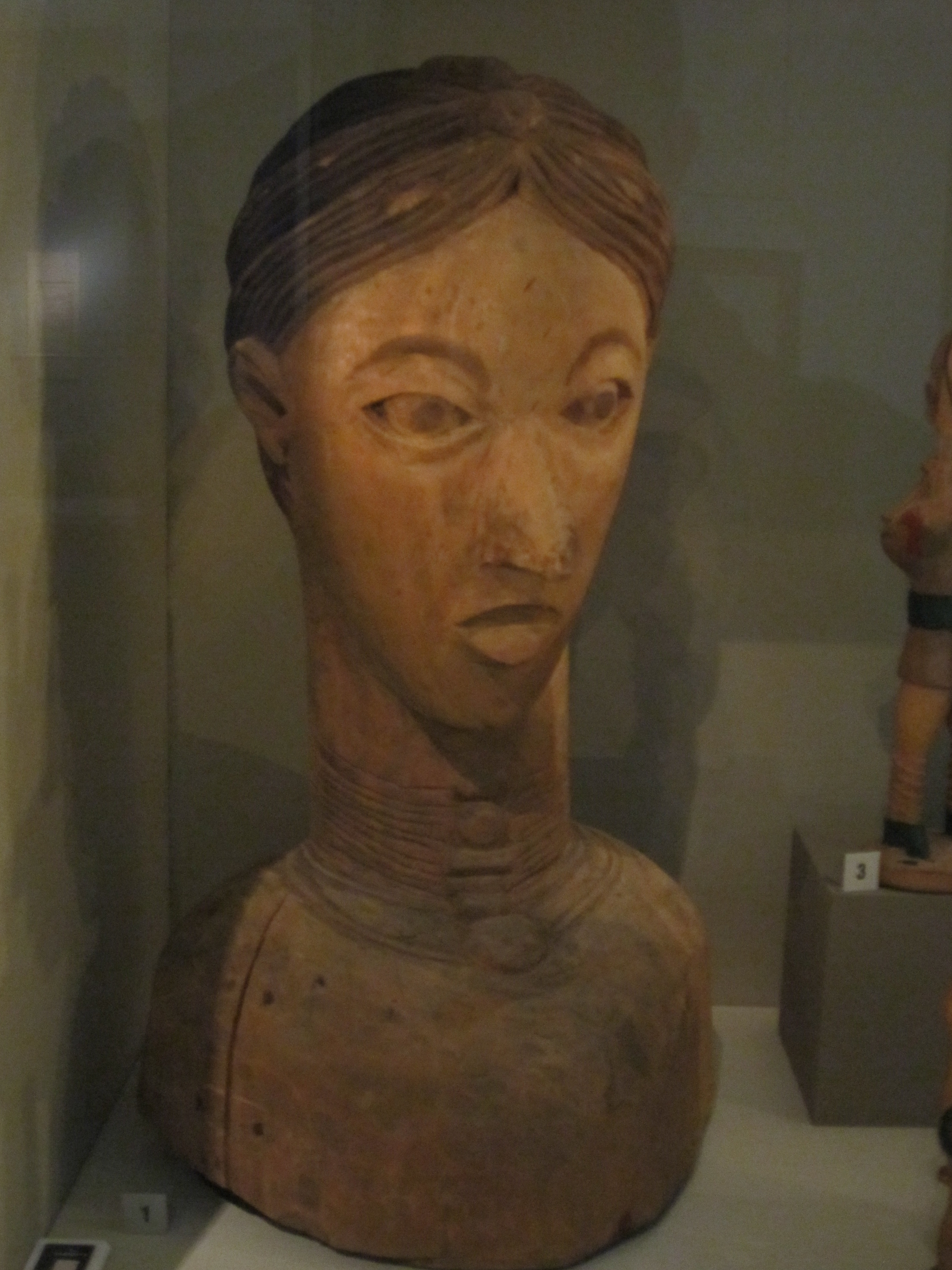
Carved wooden bust (Ibibio sculptor, Nigeria), World Museum Liverpool

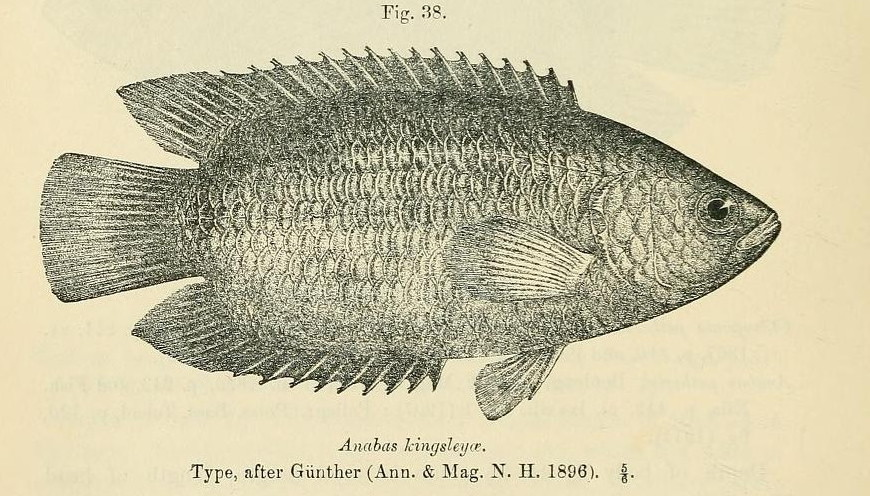
Plate depicting the fish species Ctenopoma kingsleyae - a climbing gourami named for Kingsley

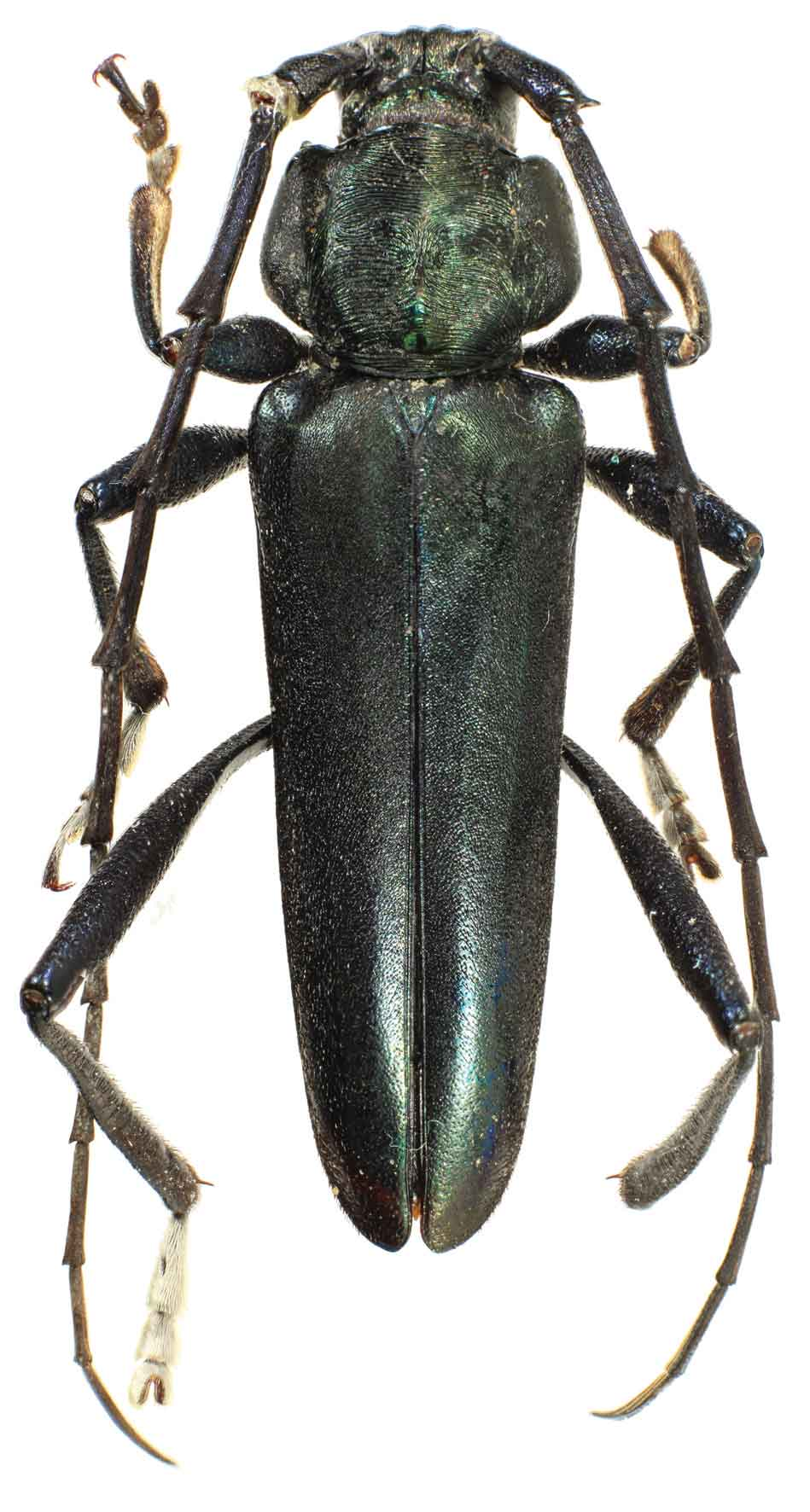
Holotype of the Longhorn beetle species Pseudictator kingsleyae - specific name honouring Kingsley

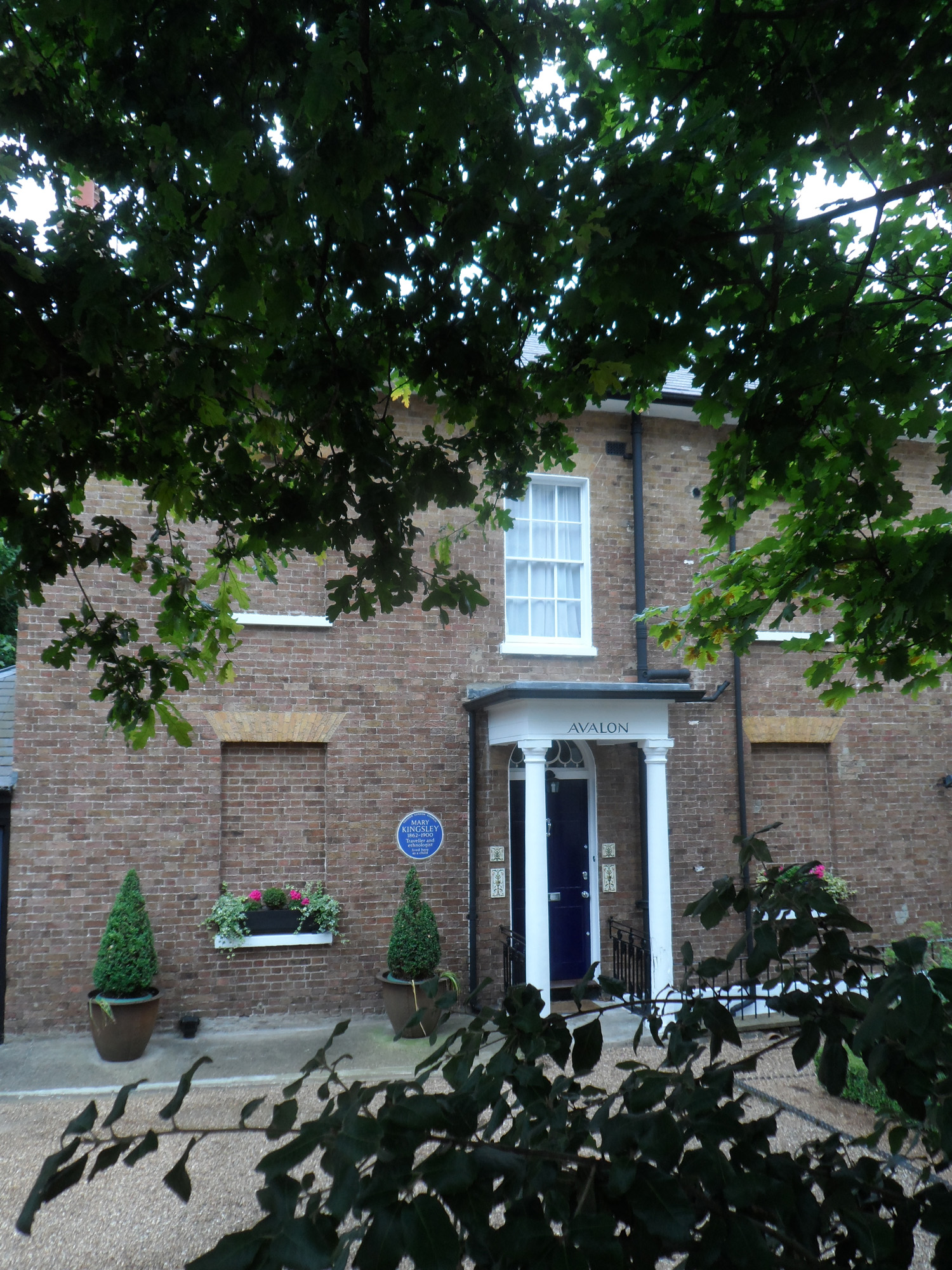
"Avalon", 22 Southwood Lane, Highgate: Kingsley's childhood home

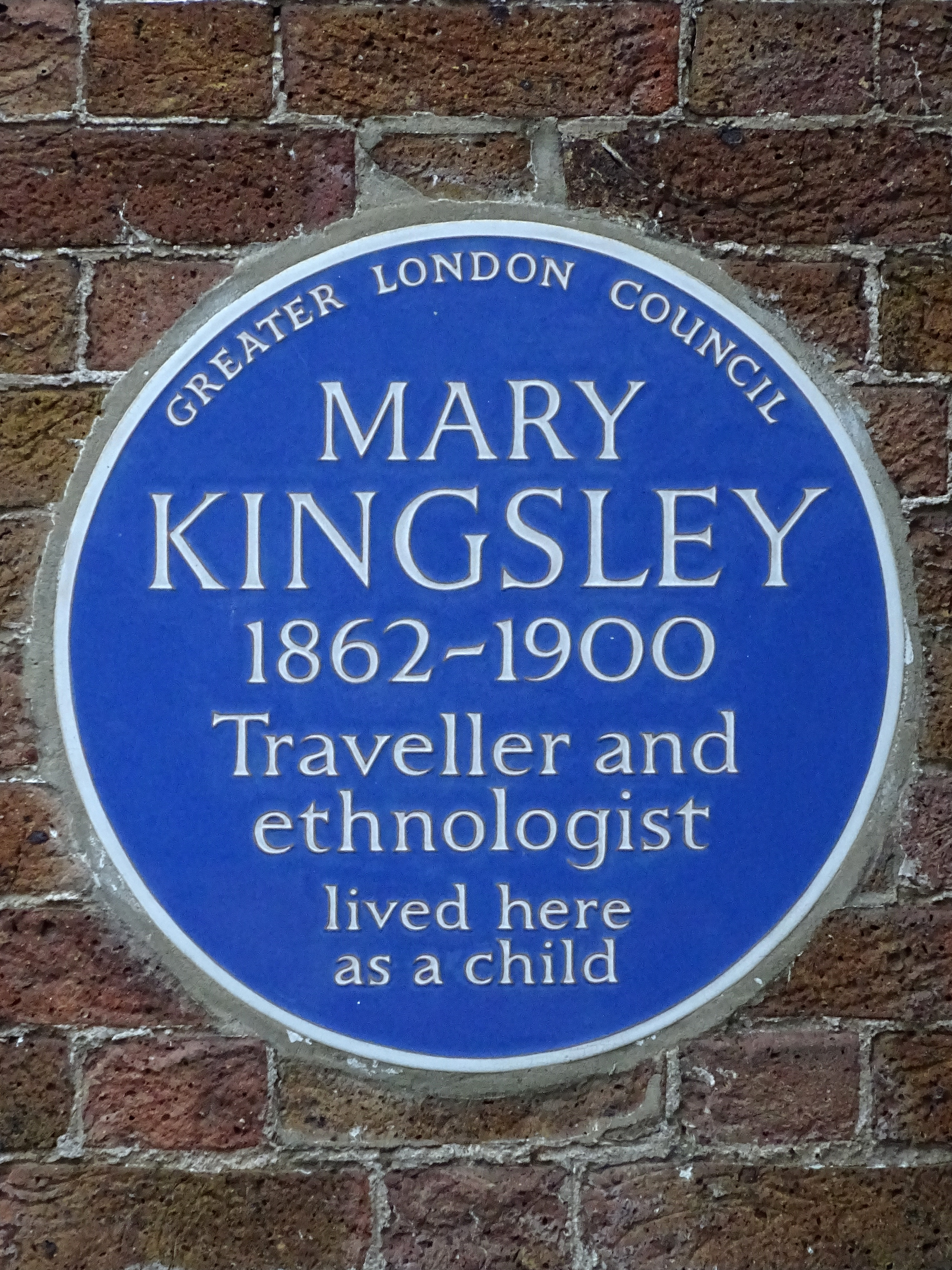
Blue plaque erected in 1975 by Greater London Council at "Avalon"

== See also ==
- List of female adventurers
