= Vallings =

Vallings is a surname. Notable people with the surname include:

- Gabrielle Vallings (1886–1969), British singer and novelist
- George Vallings (1932–2007), British Royal Navy officer
- Ros Vallings (fl. 1966), New Zealand medical doctor
