= Gratiana Chanter =

- Born: 1857
- Died: 1934
- Occupations: Novelist, illustrator
- Parents: John Mill Chanter (father); Charlotte Chanter (mother)

Gratiana Chanter Knocker (1857 – 1934) was a British novelist and illustrator.

Gratiana Chanter was born in 1857 in Ilfracombe, Devon, the daughter of novelist Charlotte Chanter and vicar John Mill Chanter. She came from a family of novelists; her mother's brothers were the novelists Charles Kingsley and Henry Kingsley.

She published Wanderings in North Devon (1887), a collection of her father's writings. Her novel The Witch of Withyford (1896) was a story of about witches, murder, and child kidnapping. She also published a collection of short stories, The Rainbow Garden (1901). All of these books were accompanied by her own illustrations.

== Personal life ==
She married Edward Longworth Knocker, who was 15 years younger than her, in 1896. They settled in Italy.

== Death and legacy ==
- Wanderings in North Devon: Being records and reminiscences in the life of John Mill Chanter. Ilfracombe: Twiss and Son, 1887.
- The Witch of Withyford: A Story of Exmoor. 1 vol. London: J. M. Dent, 1896.
- The Rainbow Garden and Other Stories. 1 vol. London: R. B. Johnson, 1901.
- "Trebetherick": a story of North Cornwall as written by one David Roounsevall of the parish of St. Enodoc in that country. Naples: F. Giannini & figli, 1913.
