= Chanter (surname) =

Chanter is a surname. Notable people with the surname include:

- The Chanter Sisters, duo of British singers comprising Irene Chanter and Doreen Chanter
- Charlotte Chanter (1828–1882), British author
- Doreen Chanter, British singer, one of the Chanter Sisters
- John Chanter, Australian politician
- Vic Chanter, Australian rules footballer

== See also ==
- Hugh the Chanter, an alternative name for Hugh Sottovagina, twelfth century historian
- John the Chanter, medieval Bishop of Exeter
