= Henry Venables =

Australian educationist and school inspector

Henry Pares Venables (born 1830 in London – d. 31 December 1890 at Fordingbridge near Bournemouth) was an Australian educationist and school inspector.

Venables was educated at Eton College and Exeter College, Oxford, (B.A., 1853). Desiring to try his luck on the goldfields, Venables arrived in Melbourne in the Gauntlet with Henry Kingsley on 3 December 1853.

Venables was appointed Secretary to the Education Department of Victoria on the initiation of the free, secular and compulsory system under the Act passed by the late Mr. Justice James Wilberforce Stephen.

Works published by Venables include: Outline of the Geography of Victoria, for the Use of Schools (1861), Syllabus of Parsing and Analysis … for the Pass Examination at Matriculation (1882, 1885, 1887, 1890), and maps of Australasia, Malaysia and Western Polynesia (1870, 1874), and New Zealand (1870).
