= Ravenshoe (novel) =

1862 novel by Henry Kingsley

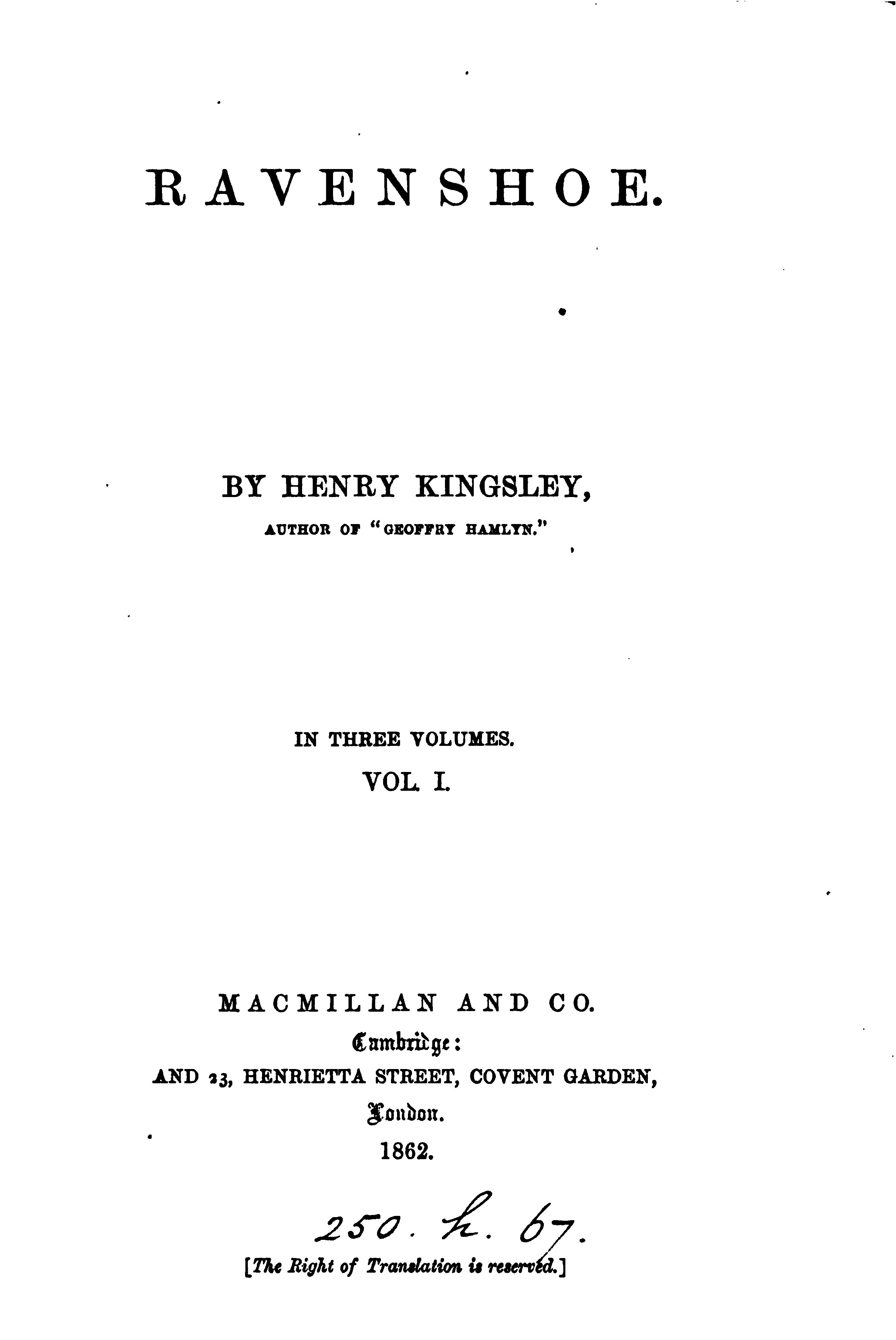
- Title page of the first edition
- Author: Henry Kingsley
- Language: English
- Published: 1862
- Publisher: Macmillan and Co. (London)
- Publication place: United Kingdom
- Media type: Print
- OCLC: 3652838
- Dewey Decimal: 823.943
- LC Class: PR4845 .K5
- Text: Ravenshoe at Internet Archive

Ravenshoe is a novel by English author Henry Kingsley, published in 1862. It has been noted for the complexity of its three-part plot, and for its description of the Charge of the Light Brigade, a failed military action during the Battle of Balaclava in the Crimean War.

== Overview ==
The story centres round Charles, who was swapped at birth and is really William. When many years later he learns of this fact, he becomes a groom under an assumed name, and, when his identity leaks out, enlists in the Army and goes to the Crimea, where he is one of the six hundred of the Light Brigade which made the famous charge.

== Plot ==
The "House of Ravenshoe" in Stonington, Ireland, is the scene of this novel; and the principal actors are the members of the noble family of Ravenshoe. The plot has three stages. Denzel Ravenshoe, a Roman Catholic, marries a Protestant wife. They have two sons, Cuthbert and Charles. Cuthbert is brought up as a Catholic and Charles as a Protestant. This is the cause of enmity on the part of Father Mackworth, a dark, sullen man, the priest of the family, who has friendly relations with Cuthbert alone. James Norton, Denzel’s groom, is on intimate terms with his master. He marries Norah, the maid of Lady Ravenshoe. Charles becomes a sunny, lovable man; Cuthbert, a reticent bookworm. They have as playmates William and Ellen, the children of Norah. Two women play an important part in the life of the hero, Charles,—Adelaide, very beautiful in form and figure, with little depth, and lovely Mary Corby, who, cast up by shipwreck, is adopted by Norah. Charles becomes engaged to Adelaide. The plot deepens. Father Mackworth proves that Charles is the true son of Norah and James Norton, the illegitimate brother of Denzel; and William, the groom foster-brother, is real heir of Ravenshoe. To add to the grief of Charles, Adelaide elopes with his cousin Lord Welter. Charles flees to London, tries grooming, and then joins the Hussars. Finally he is found in London by a college friend, Marston, with a raving fever upon him. After recovery, Charles returns to Ravenshoe. Father Mackworth again produces evidence that not James Norton, but Denzel is the illegitimate son, and Charles, after all, is true heir to Ravenshoe. The union of Charles and Mary then takes place.

== Reception ==
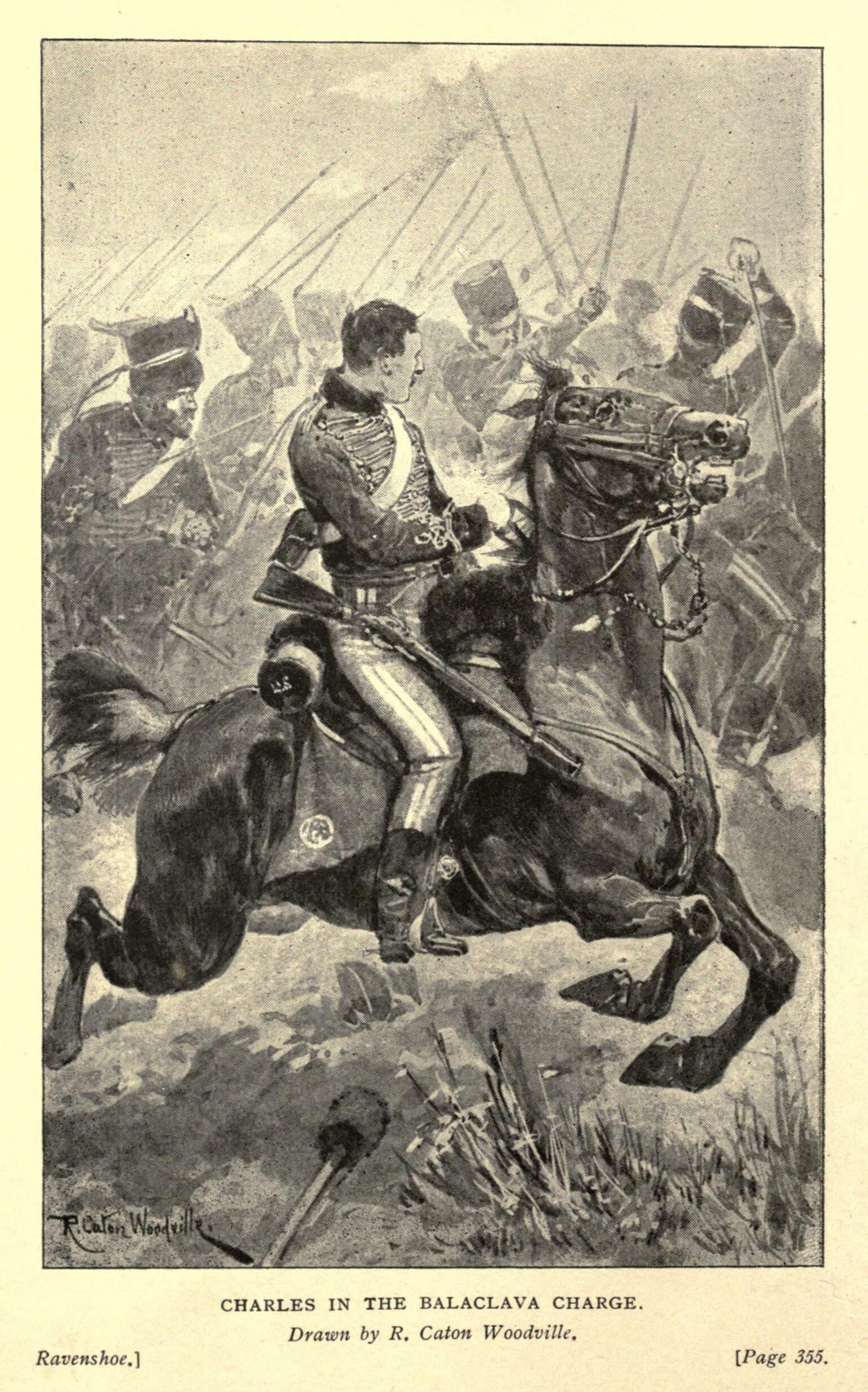
Frontispiece to a new edition, 1894, drawn by R. Caton Woodville

By 1906, many critics had hailed Ravenshoe as Henry Kingsley's masterpiece, while others characterised it as "typical of him at his best". Helen Rex Keller called the plot "remarkable for its complexity". Lewis Melville signalled out for praise a "delightfully humorous" account of the House of Ravenshoe at the opening of the book, and the passages dealing with the famous Charge of the Light Brigade: "His description of that fierce struggle is stirring, and the passage with which he concludes is beautiful."

Oh, but the sabres bit deep that autumn afternoon! There were women in Minsk, in Moglef, in Tohernigof, in Jitenier, in Polemva, whose husbands were Hussars—and women in Taganrog, in Tcherkask, in Aarepta, which lies under the pleasant slate mountains, whose husbands and sons were Cossacks—who were made widows that day. For that day's work there was weeping in reed-thatched hovels of the Don, and the mud-built shanties of the Dnieper. For the 17th Lancers, the Scots-Greys, the 1st Royals, and the 6th Enniskillens—"these terrible beef-fed islanders" (to use the words of the Northern Bee)—were upon them; and Volnyia and Hampshire, Renfrewshire and Grodno, Podolia and Fermanagh, were mixed together in one common ruin. Still, they say, the Princess Petrovitch, on certain days, leaves her carriage, and walks a mile through the snow barefoot, into Alexandroski, in memory of her light-haired handsome young son, whom Hornby slew at Balaclava. And I myself know the place where Lady Allerton makes her pilgrimage for those two merry boys of hers who lie out on the Crimean hill. Alas! not side by side. Up and down, in all weathers, along a certain gravel walk, where the chalk brook, having flooded the park with its dammed-up waters, comes foaming and spouting over a cascade, and hurries past the smooth-mown lawns of the pleasance. In the very place where she stood when the second letter came. And there, they say, she will walk at times, until her beauty and her strength are gone, and her limbs refuse to carry her.

The author himself regarded Ravenshoe with much affection: "Of all the ghosts of old friends which I have called up in this quaint trade, the writing of fiction, only two remain and never quit me. The others come and go, and I love them well enough; but the two who are with me always are the peaked-faced man Charles Ravenshoe, and the lame French girl Mathilde."

== Sources ==
- Birch, Dinah, ed. (2009). "Ravenshoe". In The Oxford Companion to English Literature. 7th ed. Oxford University Press. Retrieved 23 October 2022.
- Kingsley, Henry (1894). Ravenshoe. New ed. London: Ward, Lock and Bowden, Limited. pp. 350–356.

Attribution:

- Keller, Helen Rex (1917). "Ravenshoe". In The Reader's Digest of Books. The Library of the World's Best Literature. New York: The Macmillan Company. pp. 711–712.
- Melville, Lewis (1906). Victorian Novelists. London: Archibald Constable and Company, Limited. pp. 250–254.
