= George Kingsley =

English physician and traveller

- Born: George Henry Kingsley; 14 February 1826; Barnack, Northamptonshire, England
- Died: 5 February 1892 (aged 65); Cambridge
- Resting place: Highgate Cemetery
- Spouse: Mary Bailey (m. 1860; died 1892)
- Children: 2 (including Mary Kingsley)
- Relatives: Charlotte Chanter (sister); Charles Kingsley (brother); Henry Kingsley (brother)

George Henry Kingsley (14 February 1826 – 5 February 1892) was a medical doctor, traveller and writer. He was a brother of the clergyman and writer Charles Kingsley.

== Early life and career ==
Kingsley was the fourth of five children of the Reverend Charles Kingsley and his wife Mary; he was born at Barnack, Northamptonshire on 14 February 1826. Charles Kingsley and the novelist Henry Kingsley were his brothers, and the writer Charlotte Chanter was his sister. He was educated at King's College School, London, at the University of Edinburgh, where he graduated M.D. in 1846, and in Paris, where he was slightly wounded during the barricades of 1848. Later in 1848 his activity in combating the outbreak of cholera in England was commemorated by his brother Charles in the portrait of Tom Thurnall in Two Years Ago.

Kingsley completed his medical education in Heidelberg, and returned to England about 1850. He became the private physician to a succession of aristocratic patients; he adopted foreign travel as his method of treatment, and either in the capacity of medical adviser, or merely as travelling companion, he explored many countries of the world.

While acting as medical adviser to the Earl of Ellesmere's family, he had the partial care of the library at Bridgewater House, Westminster; he compiled a catalogue of Elizabethan dramas held there, and in 1865 he edited, from a manuscript preserved in the library, Francis Thynne's Animadversions uppon the Annotacions and Corrections of some Imperfections of Impressiones of Chaucer's Workes … reprinted in 1598.

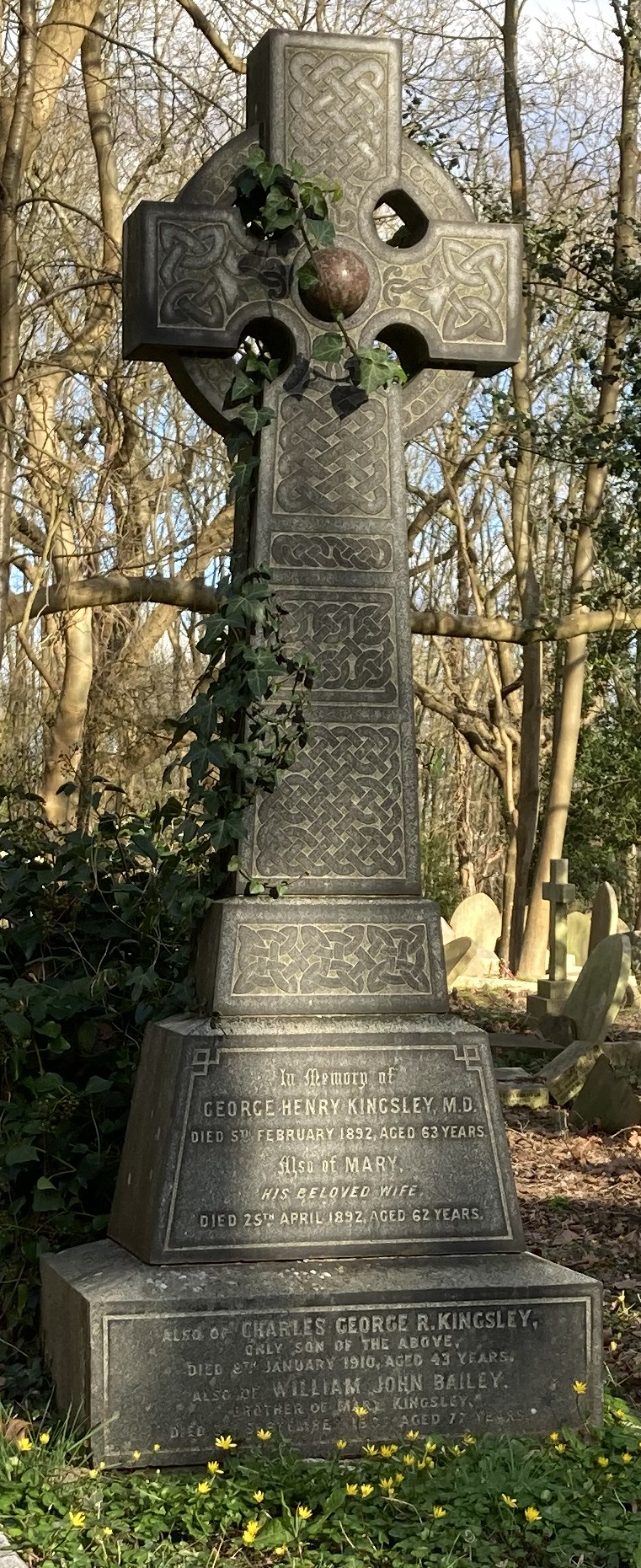
Family grave of George Kingsley in Highgate Cemetery (east side)

== Travels ==
In 1866 Kingsley accompanied Baroness Herbert of Lea and her children on a tour of Spain. Between 1867 and 1870 he travelled in Polynesia with Baroness Herbert's son, the Earl of Pembroke, and he recorded his experiences in South Sea Bubbles "by the Earl and the Doctor" (1872). This book of travel and adventure won great and instant success, reaching a fifth edition by 1873.

In the 1870s he travelled with Lord Dunraven on a tour of the US and Canada. Kingsley did much work as a naturalist, and made many contributions to The Field as "the Doctor". His later travels included Newfoundland, Japan, New Zealand and Australia.

== Family and later years ==
Kingsley married in 1860 Mary Bailey (died 25 April 1892), and they had a son, Charles George R. Kingsley, and a daughter, the writer and explorer Mary Kingsley. In 1879 he moved from Highgate in London to Bexleyheath, Kent, later moving to Cambridge. His genial manners and store of picturesque information rendered him popular in society.

He died on 5 February 1892, at his home in Cambridge, and was buried on 15 February on the east side of Highgate Cemetery. His wife Mary, only son Charles and brother-in-law William John Bailey are buried with him.

== Publications ==
Other publications are:

- Four Phases of Love. Translated from the German of Heyse (1857)
- A Gossip on a Sutherland Hillside (1861): a descriptive sketch of a stalking expedition in Sutherland, included by Francis Galton in his Vacation Tourists and Notes of Travel
- The New Templi Carmina (1863): A Collection of Church Music. Works of the Best European Composers, Published by S. T. Gordon, 538 Broadway, New York. Book located and verified in the library of Dr. Frank Hudson
