= Mary Slessor =

Scottish Presbyterian missionary (1848–1915)

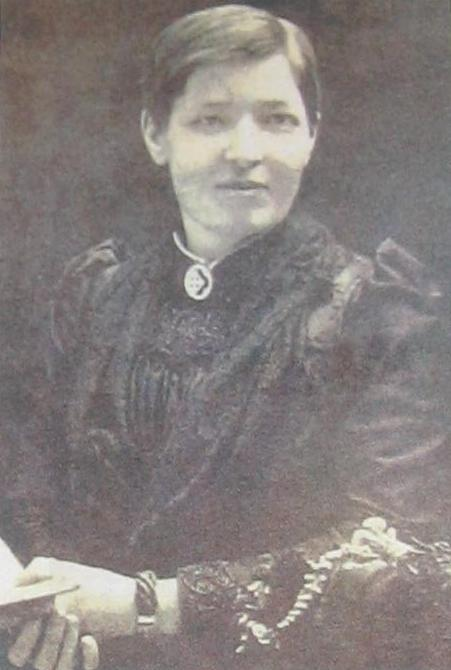
- Born: 2 December 1848; Aberdeen, Scotland
- Died: 13 January 1915 (aged 66); Use Ikot Oku, Calabar, Colony and Protectorate of Nigeria
- Known for: Christian missionary work in Africa, women's rights, and rescuing children from infanticide

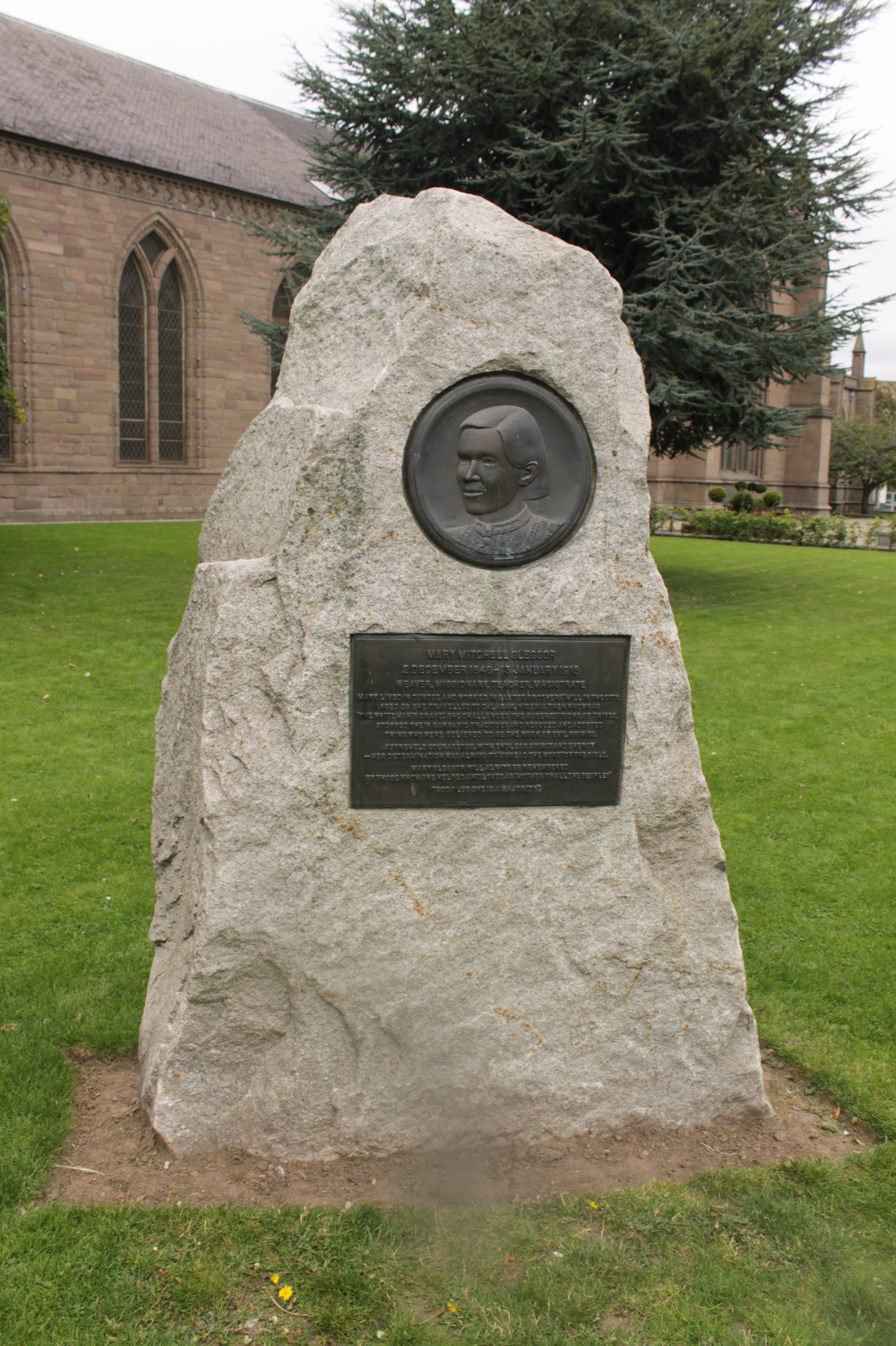
Monument to Mary Slessor, Steeple Church, Dundee

Mary Mitchell Slessor (2 December 1848 – 13 January 1915) was a Scottish Presbyterian missionary to Nigeria. Once in Nigeria, Slessor learned Efik, one of many local languages, then began teaching. Because of her understanding of the native language and her bold personality Slessor gained the trust and acceptance of the locals and was able to spread Christianity while promoting women's rights and protecting native children. She is most famous for her role in helping to stop the common practice of infanticide of twins in Okoyong, an area of Cross River State, Nigeria.

== Early life ==
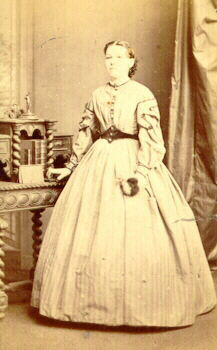
Mary Slessor

Mary Mitchell Slessor was born on 2 December 1848 in Gilcomston, Aberdeen, Scotland, to a poor working-class family who could not afford proper education. She was the second of seven children of Robert and Mary Slessor. Her father, originally from Buchan, was a shoemaker by trade. Her mother was born in Oldmeldrum, Aberdeenshire, and was a deeply religious woman. In 1859, the family moved to Dundee in search of work. Robert Slessor was an alcoholic and, unable to keep up shoemaking, took a job as a labourer in a mill. Her mother was a skilled weaver and went to work in the mills. At age 11, Mary began work as a "half-timer" in the Baxter Brothers' Mill, meaning she spent half of her day at a school provided by the mill owners and the other half working for the company.

The Slessors lived in the slums of Dundee. Her father and both brothers died of pneumonia, leaving behind only Mary, her mother, and two sisters. By age 14, Mary had become a skilled jute worker at the mill, working from 6 a.m. to 6 p.m. with just an hour for breakfast and lunch.

Her mother was a devout Presbyterian who read each issue of the Missionary Record, a monthly magazine published by the United Presbyterian Church (later the United Free Church of Scotland) to inform members of missionary activities and needs. Slessor developed an interest in religion, and when a mission was instituted in Quarry Pend (close by the Wishart Church), she wanted to teach. She began a mission at age 27 upon hearing that David Livingstone, the famous missionary and explorer, had died. She decided then that she wanted to follow in his footsteps.

== Missionary work ==
Slessor applied to the Foreign Mission Board of the United Presbyterian Church. After training in Edinburgh, she set sail on the SS Ethiopia on 5 August 1876 with her cousin Robert Mitchell Beedie, a missionary from New Deer in Buchan and arrived at her destination in West Africa just over a month later.

Slessor was assigned to the Calabar region in the land of the Efik people. She was warned that they believed in traditional West African religion and had superstitions about women giving birth to twins. Slessor lived in the missionary compound for three years, working in the missions in Old Town and Creek Town. She wanted to go deeper into Calabar but contracted malaria and was forced to return to Scotland to recover in 1879. After 16 months in Scotland, Slessor returned to Calabar, this time to a new assignment three miles farther into Calabar, in Old Town. Since Slessor assigned a large portion of her salary to support her mother and sisters in Scotland, she economised by eating the native food.

Mary Slessor is pictured with adopted children Jean, Alice, Maggie and May, in an image taken in Scotland.

Issues Slessor confronted as a young missionary included the lack of Western education, as well as widespread human sacrifice at the death of a village elder who it was believed required servants and retainers to accompany him into the next world. According to biographer W. P. Livingstone, when two deputies went out to inspect the mission in 1881–82, they were much impressed. They stated, "… she enjoys the unreserved friendship and confidence of the people and has much influence over them". This they attributed partly to the ease with which Slessor spoke the language.

In 1884 Slessor returned to Scotland for a health furlough. During the next three years, Slessor looked after her mother and sister (who had also fallen ill), and spoke at many churches, sharing stories from the Calabar area.

Slessor then returned to an area farther away from central Calabar, from the areas which had already eliminated the more heathen practices. She saved hundreds of twins out of the bush, where they had been left either to starve to death or to be eaten by animals. She helped heal the sick and stop the practice of determining guilt by making the suspects drink poison. As a missionary, she went to other tribes, spreading the word of Jesus Christ. During this third mission to Calabar, Slessor received news that her mother and sister had died. She was overcome with loneliness, writing, "There is no one to write and tell my stories and nonsense to." She had also found a sense of independence, writing, "Heaven is now nearer to me than Britain, and no one will worry about me if I go up country."

Slessor was a driving force behind the establishment of the Hope Waddell Training Institute in Calabar, which provided practical vocational training to Efiks. The superstitious threat against twins was also prominent in the Igbo town of Arochukwu in western Calabar..

== Among the Okoyong and Efik ==
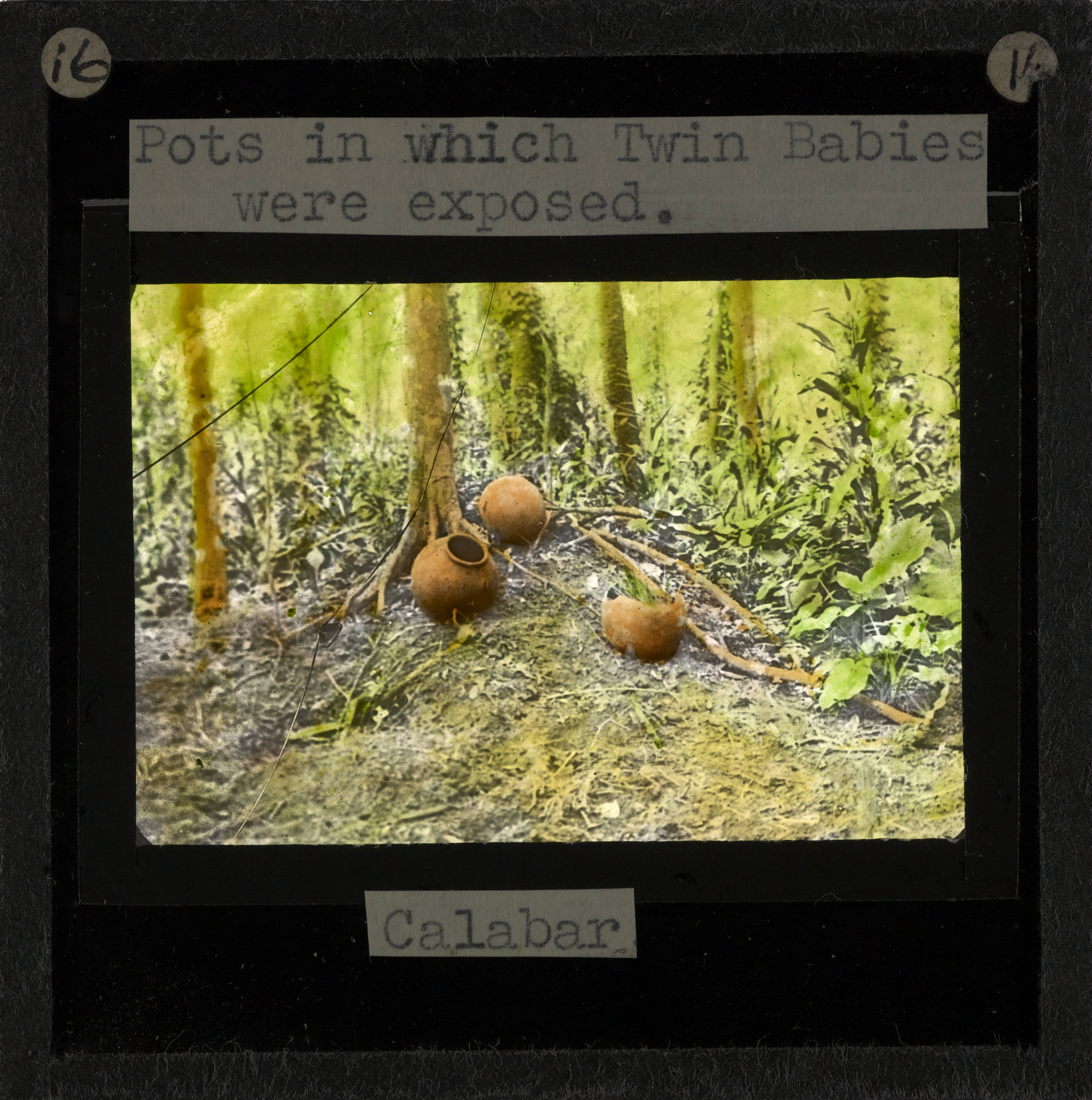
Pots in which twin babies were exposed to die (c. 1880)

In August 1888, Slessor travelled north to Okoyong, an area where male missionaries had been killed. She thought her teachings and the fact she was a woman would be less threatening to unreached tribes. For 15 years, Slessor lived with the Okoyong and the Efik people. She learned to speak the native Efik language, and made close personal friendships wherever she went, becoming known for her pragmatism and humour. Slessor lived a simple life in a traditional house with Efiks. Her insistence on lone stations often led her into conflict with the authorities and gained her a reputation for eccentricity. However, her exploits were heralded in Britain, and she became known as the "white queen of Okoyong". Slessor continued her focus on evangelism, settling disputes, encouraging trade, establishing social changes and introducing Western education.

It was the belief in the area that the birth of twins was considered a particularly evil curse. Natives feared that the father of one of the infants was a 'devil child', and that the mother had been guilty of a great sin. Unable to determine which twin was fathered by the evil spirit, the natives often abandoned both babies in clay pots to die. In most of Calabar the practice had been eliminated by the missionaries and King Eyo Honesty II. Slessor left the area of Calabar and moved further in to Okoyong. She adopted every child she found abandoned and sent out twins' missioners to find, protect and care for them at the mission house. Some mission compounds had numerous babies. Slessor once saved a pair of twins, a boy and a girl, but the boy did not survive. She took the girl as her daughter and called her Janie. She took Janie home to Scotland with her on at least one visit.

In 1892, Slessor became vice-consul in Okoyong, presiding over the native court. In 1905 she was named vice-president of Ikot Obong native court. In 1913, she was awarded the Order of St John. Slessor's health began to suffer in her later years, but she remained in Calabar.

== Death ==
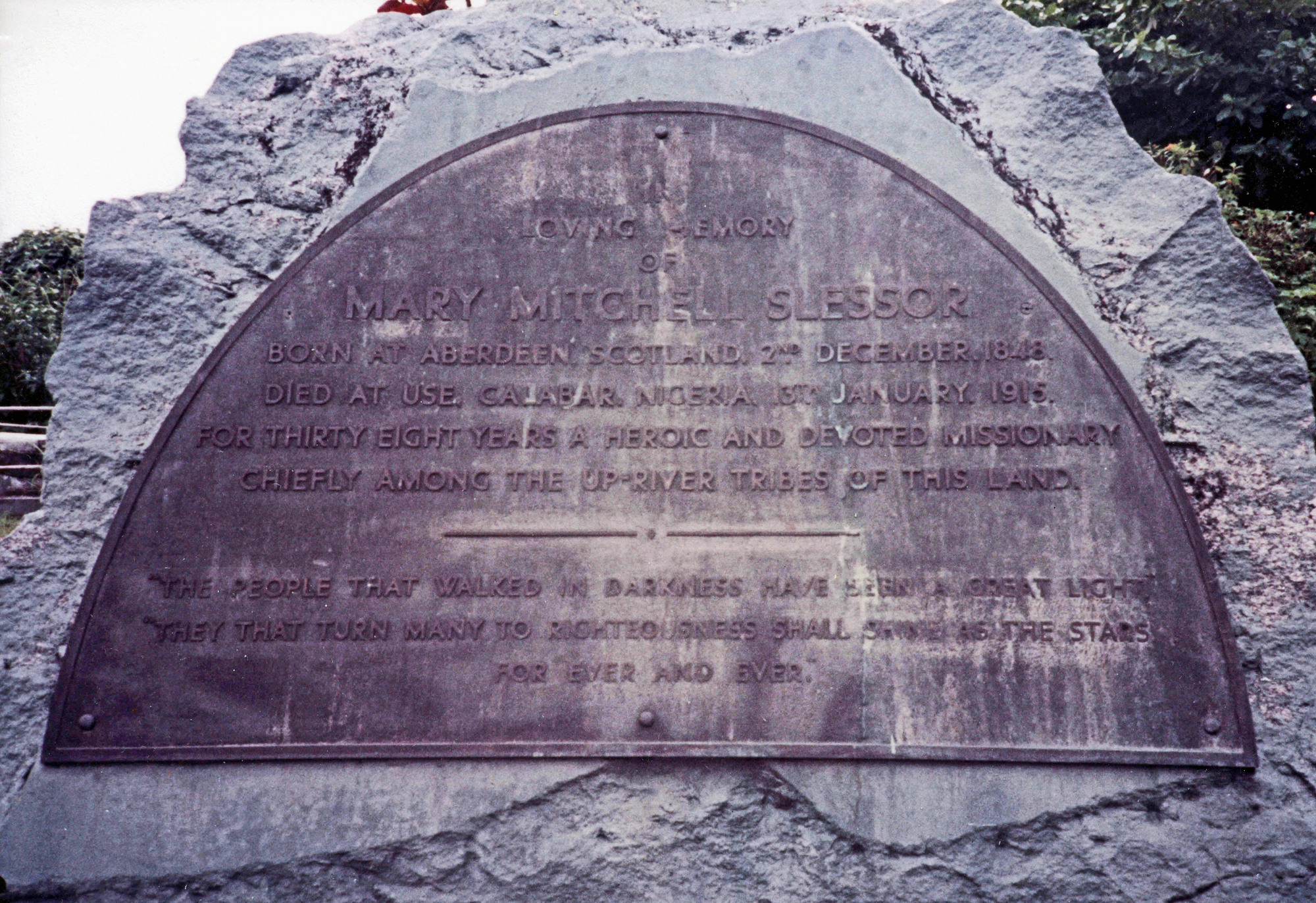
Memorial plaque on Mary Slessor's grave at Calabar, eastern Nigeria, in 1981

For the last four decades of her life, Slessor suffered intermittent fevers from the malaria she had contracted during her first station to Calabar. However, she downplayed the personal costs and never gave up her mission work to return permanently to Scotland. The fevers eventually weakened Slessor to the point she could no longer walk long distances in the rainforest but had to be pushed along in a handcart. In January 1915, while at her remote station near Use Ikot Oku, she suffered a particularly severe fever. Slessor died on 13 January 1915.

Her body was transported down the Cross River to Duke Town for the colonial equivalent of a state funeral. A Union Jack covered her coffin. Attendees included the provincial commissioner, along with other senior British officials in full uniform. Flags at government buildings were flown at half-mast. Nigeria's Governor-General Sir Frederick Lugard telegraphed his "deepest regrets" from Lagos and published a warm eulogy in The Nigeria Gazette.

A report on her death in The Southern Reporter of 21 January 1915 mentions a time she spent on furlough in Bowden, Roxburghshire, Scottish Borders. It states "She and her four adopted African children were a centre of great attraction and helped to deepen the interest of the whole community in the Foreign Mission work of the Church." It praises her strong force character, her unostentatious manner, and her zeal for the tribes around Calabar.

== Honours and legacy ==
Slessor's work in Okoyong earned her the Efik honorary title of Obongawan Okoyong (Queen of Okoyong). This title is still used commonly to refer to her in Calabar.

Several memorials in and around the Efik provinces of Calabar and Okoyong testify to the value placed on her work. Some of these include:

- a high school in Arochukwu
- Mary Slessor Road in Calabar
- Mary Slessor Roundabout
- Mary Slessor Street in Coventry
- Mary Slessor Church
- Statues of her (usually carrying twins) at various locations in Calabar

A female hostel in the University of Nigeria Nsukka is named Mary Slessor Hall in her honour. A girls' house, "Slessor House", was named after her in Achimota School, Ghana. In Scotland, a bust of Slessor is in the Hall of Heroes of the National Wallace Monument in Stirling. In Aberdeen a memorial used to stand in the city's Union Terrace Gardens prior to their redevelopment in 2024. In Dundee, a city park is named 'Slessor Gardens' in her honour. There are streets named after her in Glasgow, Dundee and Oldmeldrum in Scotland, and in Coventry in England.

Slessor was honoured on a 1997 banknote by Clydesdale Bank for the World Heritage Series and Famous Scots Series. She is featured on the back of the bank's £10 note, highlighting her work in Calabar. The note also features a map of Calabar, a lithographic vignette depicting her work with children, and a sailing ship emblem. Main-belt asteroid 4793 Slessor (1988 RR4) named to mark her centenary celebrations on 13 January 2015. In 1950, anthropologist Charles Partridge, a friend of Slessor when both were in Nigeria, donated letters from her, along with a recording of her voice, now The Slessor Collection at Dundee Central Library; he said of her: "She was a very remarkable woman. I look back on her friendship with reverence - one of the greatest honours that have befallen me."

She is remembered in the Church of England with a commemoration on 11 January.

== Gallery ==
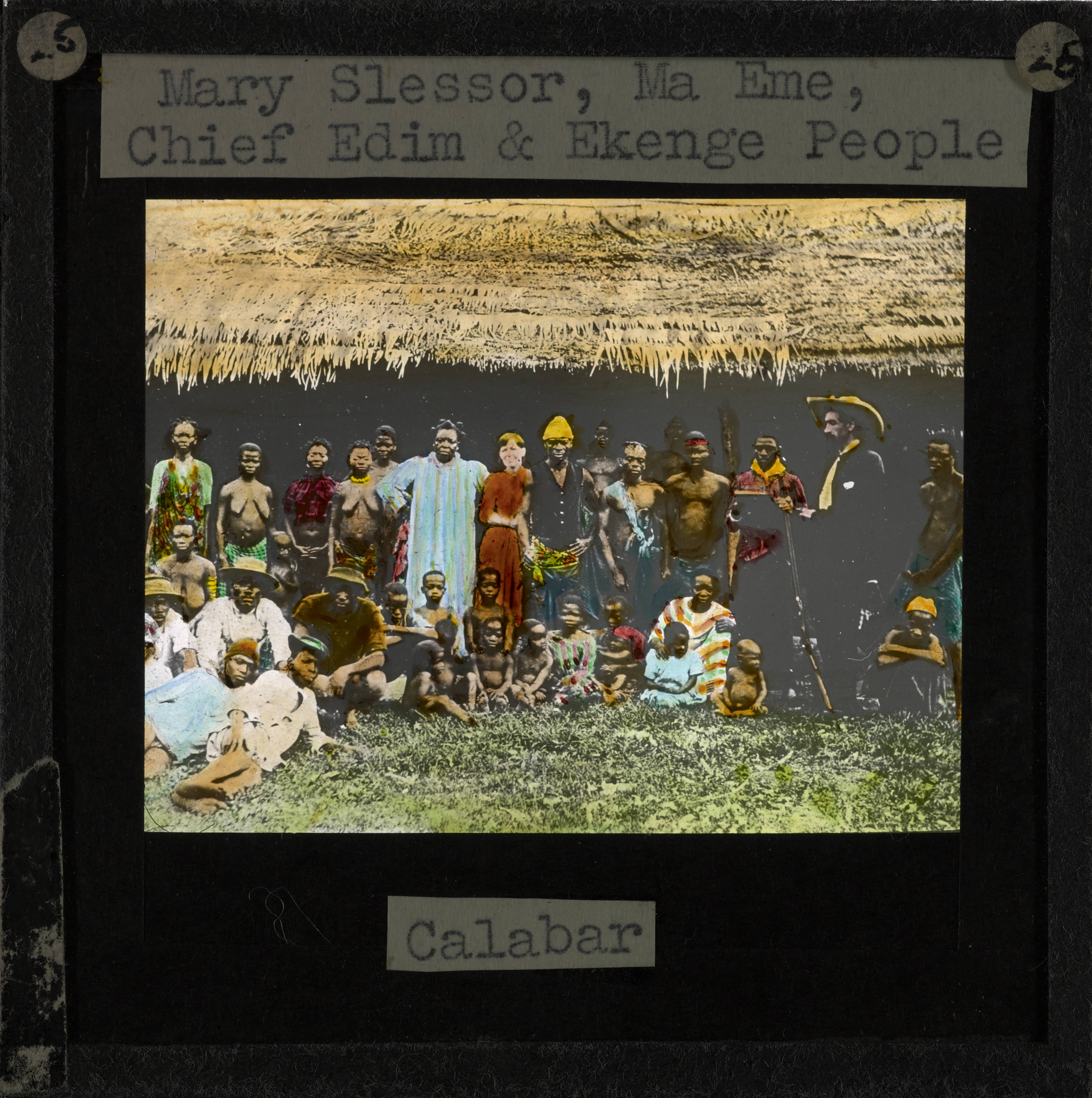
"Mary Slessor, Ma Eme, Chief Edim and Ekenge People", Calabar, late 19th century

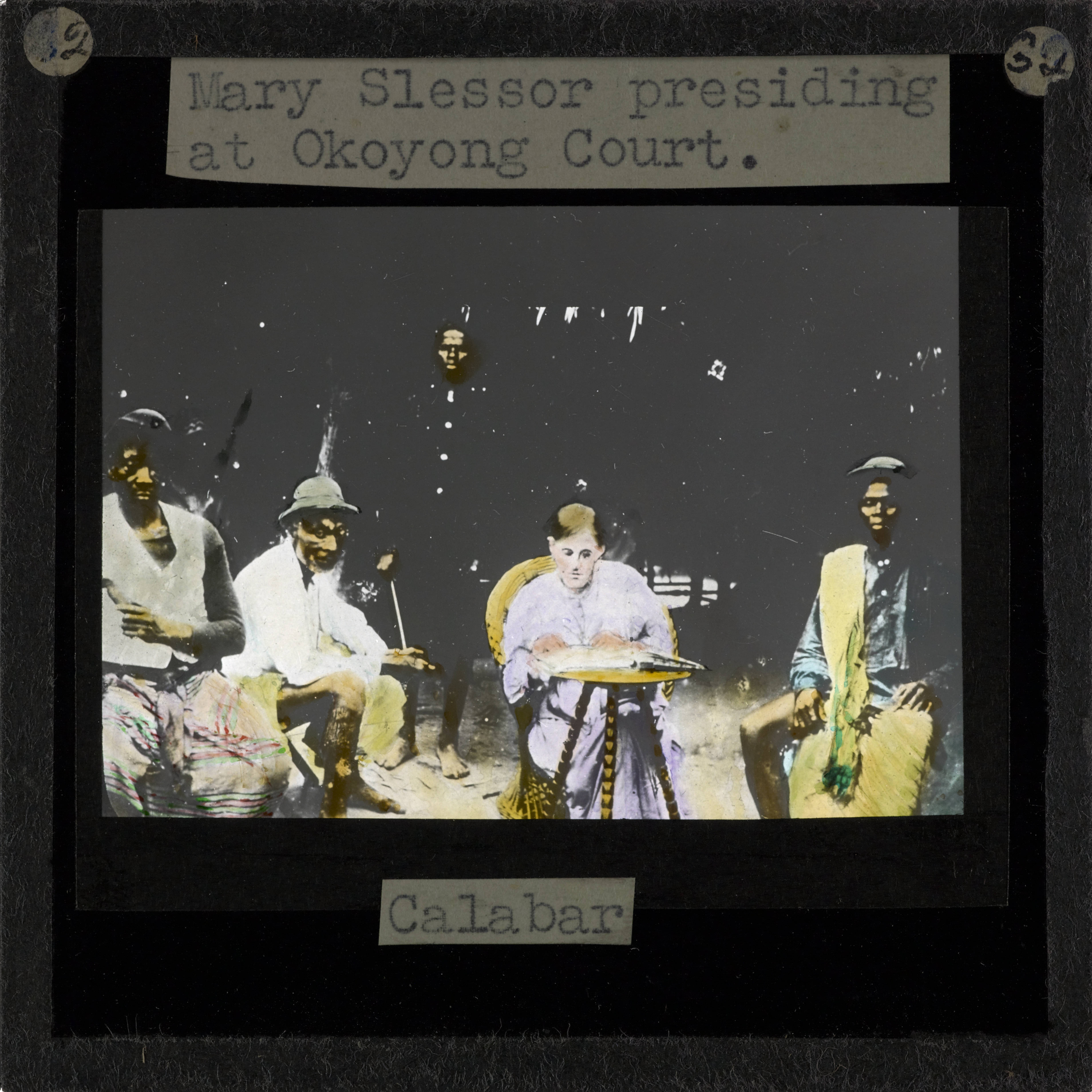
"Mary Slessor Presiding at Okoyong Court, Calabar", late 19th century

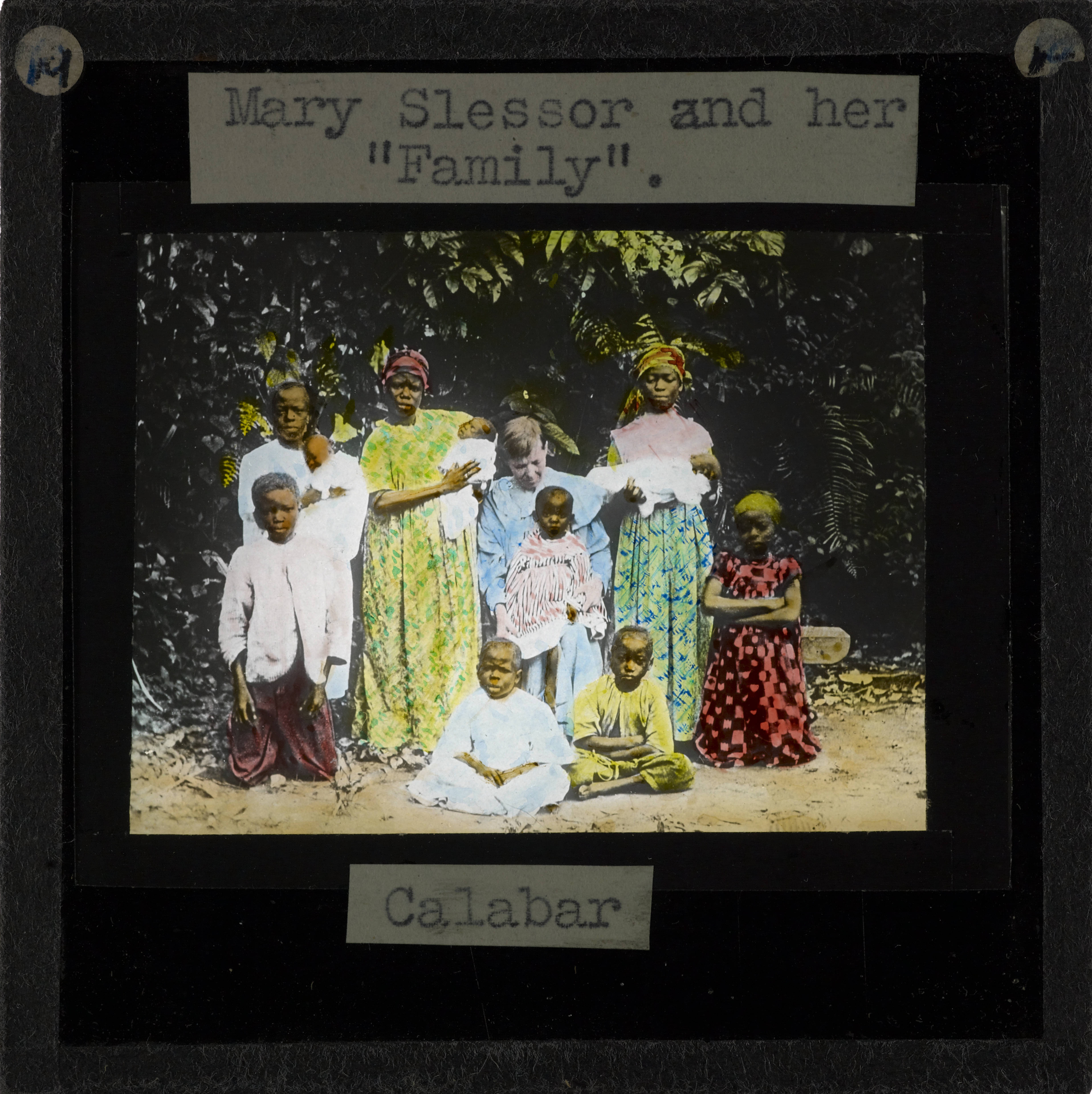
"Mary Slessor and her family", Calabar, late 19th century

== See also ==
- List of female adventurers
- People on Scottish banknotes
