= Killing of twins in Nigeria =

Cultural practice

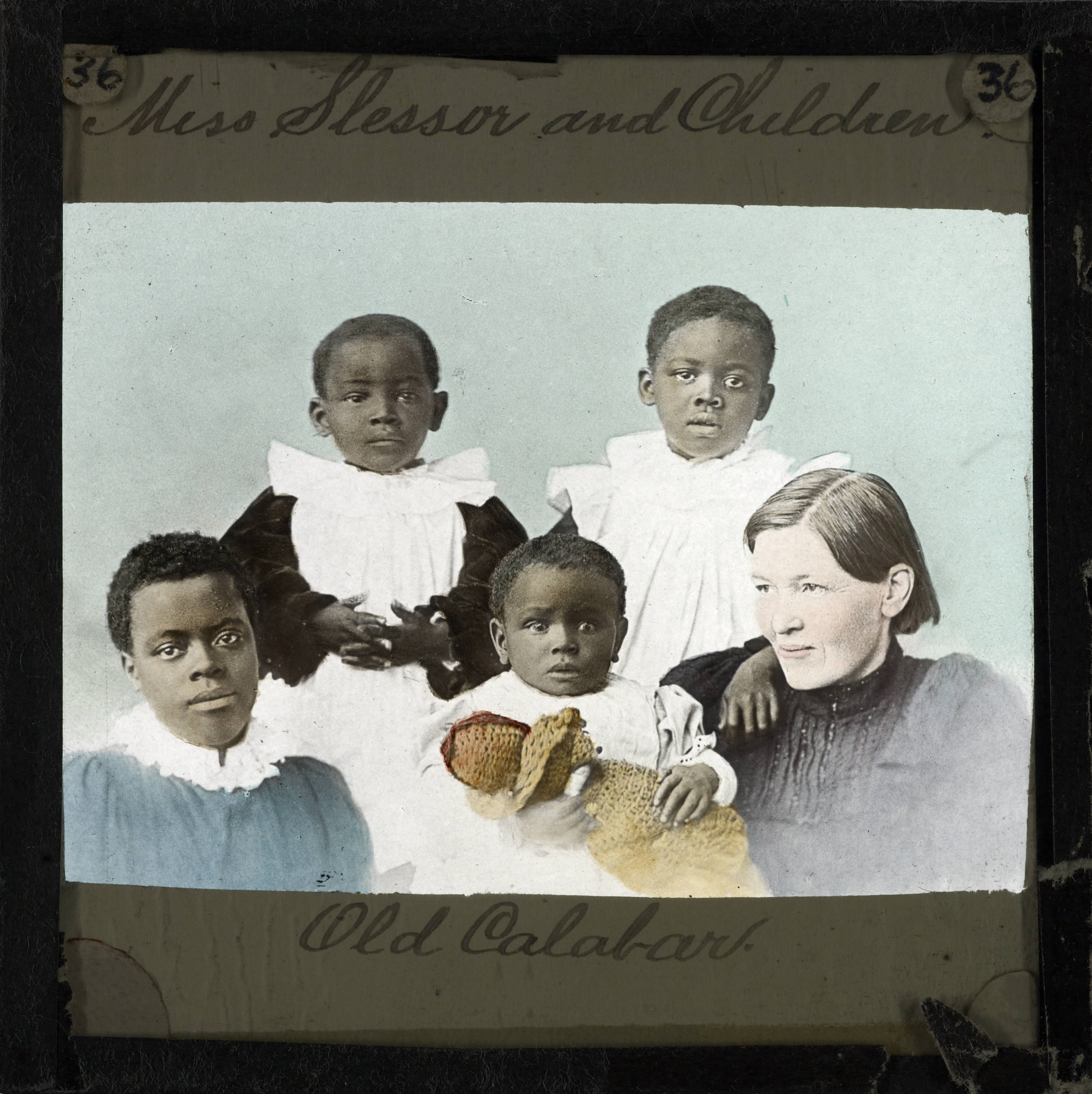
Mary Slessor and four children, Old Calabar in the late 19th century

The killing of twins was a cultural practice among some ethnic groups in Nigeria, predominantly among the Igbo and the Efik people. Giving birth to twins was considered a bad omen that could bring devastation or calamity upon society. Twin babies were believed not to be humans, and were seen as evil. Although twin killing continues in some remote areas, it is sometimes dismissed as a myth. In the 21st century, it is believed that killing of twins as a sacrifice still exists among those living in Nigeria's federal capital territory.

== Myths and beliefs about twins ==
The birth of twins was seen as an evil curse among the Igbo and Efik people. Natives feared that the father of one of the babies was an evil spirit and that the mother was guilty of a grievous sin. As a result, the Igbos especially often abandoned the twin babies in the "evil forests"; large uninhabited dense rainforests which were seldomly visited for fear of the unknown more than any other reason and metamorphosed over time to attain spiritual significance, particularly as a source of negative omens. It was considered a taboo to have twins. They were perceived as unlucky and mini gods, and it is believed that evil has befallen the community or family where they were born.

Unlike the several other tribes that practiced this, the Yoruba people saw twins to be of great importance. In the Yoruba language, twins are called "Ibeji" The Yoruba also believed that twins had supernatural powers that could increase their parents’ wealth and therefore treat them with honor. When one or both of the twins died, an Ibeji statue would be carved out in their memory. The parents would treat these statues as if they were living children by singing to them as well as feeding and caring for them. Parents that failed to take care of the Ibeji statues would suffer consequences such as poverty and illness. Even though Yoruba people eventually saw twins as of great importance there was still evidence of twin infanticide in various Yoruba communities. According to T. J. H. Chappel, the acceptance of twins across Yoruba land is likely more of a recent phenomenon.

"Most recent investigators have indicated that the Yoruba-speaking peoples of west Africa welcome twin-births and have a traditional reverence for twins to the extent that a cult is made of them. It is true that, nowadays, twin-births are generally accepted as a social fact throughout most of Yorubaland and twins treated, to some extent, as super-human beings. A number of earlier accounts, however, indicate that the contemporary cult of twins represents a reversal of the former practice of twin infanticide. The following references show that twins, and in some cases the mother as well, were destroyed throughout most of Yorubaland in former times and that until quite recently, at least in some parts, twin-births continued to be unwelcome."

== Places practiced ==
This practice was done in the South South, South Western and South Eastern parts of Nigeria. In the southeast, the core Igbo heartland, it was considered a taboo to give birth to twins. Mothers who gave birth to twins then were thought to have had intercourse with an evil spirit resulting in the birth of something unusual or unnatural. Twins were killed but were most likely abandoned in said forests and the mothers were shunned by their husbands. The killing of newborn twins was a popular practice among the Ibibio people however in the 19th century.

== Intervention by missionary Mary Slessor ==
In 1876, Mary Slessor, a Scottish missionary was assigned to the Efik territory in Calabar, Nigeria. She was 28 years old at the time of her appointment. She had a genuine interest in the rights and well-being of women and children, and worked towards educating local people about twin births. Slessor was passionate about reversing the local custom of twin-killing, and dispelling the twin taboo, and began adopting any abandoned baby to care for them at the Mission House. Within a short time, she adopted eight children as she continued her missionary work in more remote areas. She later succeeded in making a few converts who became Christians.

In 1892, she was appointed the vice-consul of the Okoyong territory by the British Consul-general, Major Claude MacDonald.

By 1915, twins and mothers of twins were purported to be fully integrated into their communities. In 1991, rumors of recent abuse prompted a survey to be carried out from January to June 1991 among the Efik, Ibibio, and Annang peoples to determine their attitude toward twins and their mothers. The majority of the women surveyed stated that they would be happy to have twins, and 8.9% of surveyed women considered twins taboo.

== See also ==
- Mary Slessor
