= Gabrielle Vallings =

Singer and novelist

Gabrielle Vallings (28 August 1886 – 1969) was a singer and novelist. She was the author Charles Kingsley's literary executor, and she completed the writer Lucas Malet's last novel after Malet's death.

== Biography ==
Gabrielle Francesca Lilian Mary Vallings was born in Hythe, Kent, England, one of nine children of James Frederic Vallings, vicar of Sopley, and Louisa Cadogan Chanter. She was a grand-niece of the novelist Charles Kingsley, who made her his literary executor, and a second cousin of his daughter Mary St Leger Kingsley, a writer better known by her pen name Lucas Malet.

Vallings was adopted by the much older Malet while still a teenager. It appears that Vallings may have been briefly engaged to Norman Sladden, a naval officer, in 1916, but there is no record of her ever marrying. Vallings and Malet lived together until Malet's death in 1931, traveling frequently to France. Malet encouraged Vallings to develop her creative abilities, first as a singer and then as a writer.

Vallings, a soprano, trained to be an opera singer, but it appears her career never took off as there are few records of public performances. She had begun performing by 1914, when a critic noticed her "pleasant soprano voice [and] fine feeling for musical expression" but advised further training. In 1919, she sang at a celebrity-studded pageant in honor of the centenary of Charles Kingsley's birth.

In 1916, Vallings published Bindweed, the first of her dozen novels, several of which had socialist themes. Bindweed, which the London Times called "a powerful first novel", centers on the travails of a young opera singer who does not know that she is of illegitimate birth. Her second novel, Tumult (1916) features a cast ranging from Australian sheep ranchers and French aristocrats to the Greek god Pan.

Vallings completed Malet's last novel, The Private Life of Mr. Justice Syme, after the author's death in 1931, and it was published in 1932.

== Selected books ==
- Bindweed (1916)
- Tumult (1917)
- The Whispering City (1922)
- Earth Fires: A Pastoral Tragedy (1926)
- Deepwater Farm (1934)
- Jude Penny (1934)
- The Silent Monk (1935)
- The Tramp of the Multitude: A Labour Triptych (1936)
- Jury Four (1938)
