= Charlotte Chanter =

British author (1828–1882)

Charlotte Chanter (née Kingsley; bapt. 17 October 1828 – 24 March 1882) was an English writer best known for a book that helped set off a Victorian fad for collecting ferns in Devon.

== Biography ==
Charlotte Kingsley was born in Barnack, Northamptonshire, to the Reverend Charles Kingsley and Mary Lucas Kingsley. Her older brothers Charles and Henry both became novelists, as did her niece, Lucas Malet. She spent her childhood in Clovelly, Devon, where her father was curate and then rector. She moved to London in 1836. Her husband, John Mills Chanter, became the vicar of Holy Trinity Church in Ilfracombe.

Chanter's 1856 book Ferny Combes was the first book to draw public attention to the great diversity of ferns to be found in Devon. Her book focused mainly on ferns discoverable within an easy distance of the coast. Like other botanizing authors of this period, she encouraged people to dig up rare ferns, contributing to the increasing rarity of certain Devon ferns. Her brother Charles coined the term pteridomania for this Victorian craze for ferns.

Chanter's 1861 novel, Over the Cliffs, had elements of both the gothic novel and the sensation novel, with a plot revolving around murder and an inheritance. Although it is said to have been well received in its day, it was panned by at least one critic.

== Selected books ==
- Ferny Combes: A Ramble After Ferns in the Glens and Valleys of Devonshire (1856)
- Over the Cliffs (1861)
