= Henry Kingsley =

English novelist (1830–1876)

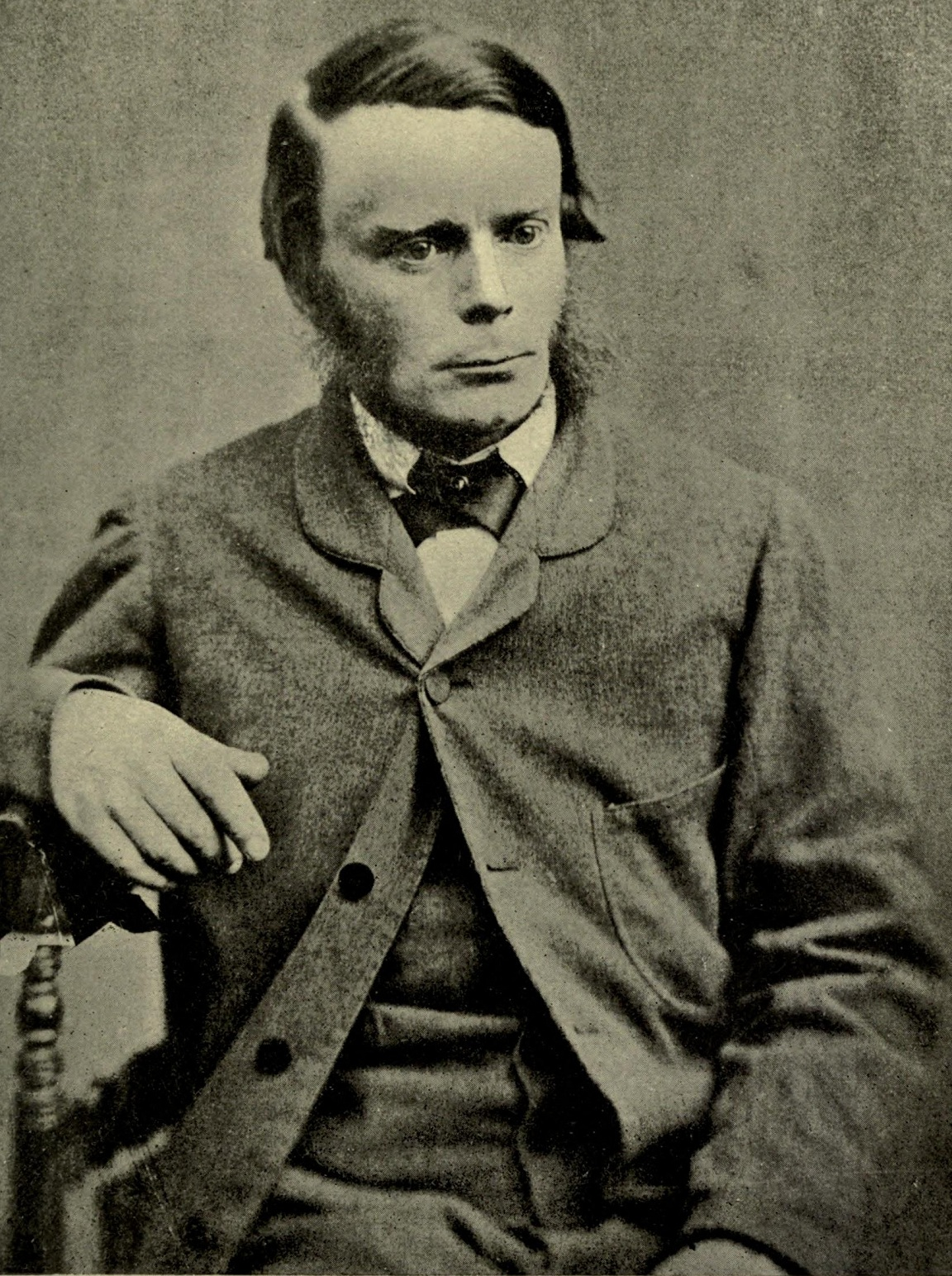
- Kingsley, c. 1870
- Born: 2 January 1830; Northamptonshire, England
- Died: 24 May 1876 (aged 46); Sussex, England

Signature
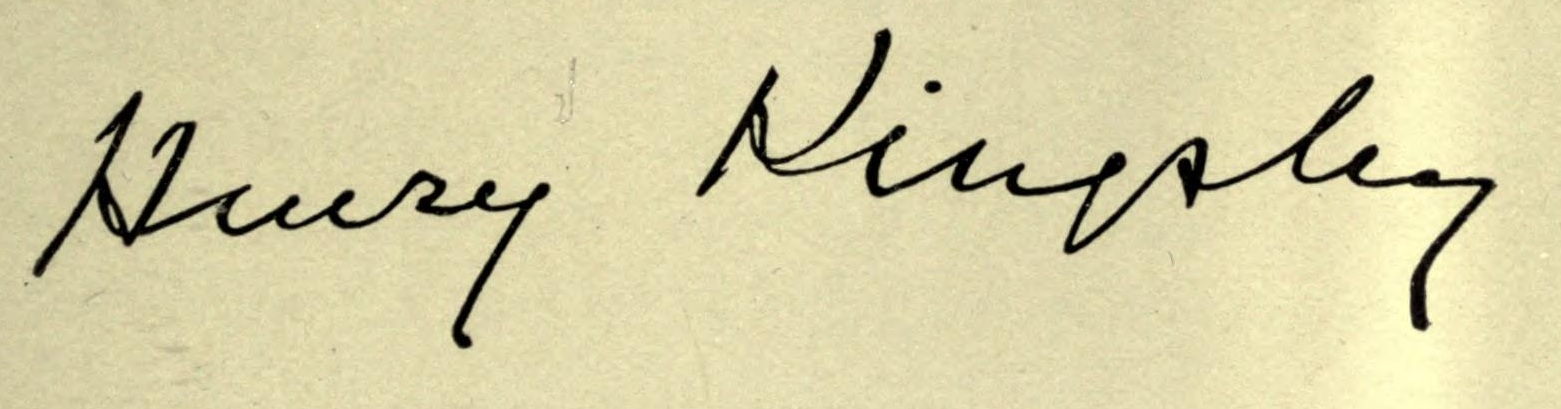

Henry Kingsley (2 January 1830 – 24 May 1876) was an English novelist, brother of the better-known Charles Kingsley. He was an early exponent of muscular Christianity in his 1859 novel The Recollections of Geoffry Hamlyn.

== Life ==
Kingsley was born at Barnack Rectory, Northamptonshire to Rev. Charles Kingsley the elder and Mary, née Lucas. There were several writers in the family besides Henry and Charles, including Mary Kingsley, an explorer and writer, Charlotte Kingsley Chanter, a botanical writer and novelist, and George Kingsley, a traveller and writer.

Kinglsey attended King's College School, King's College London, and Worcester College, Oxford, which he left without graduating. He emigrated to Australia and arrived in Melbourne in the Gauntlet in December 1853 with Henry Venables. He became involved in gold-digging, and later joined the mounted police.

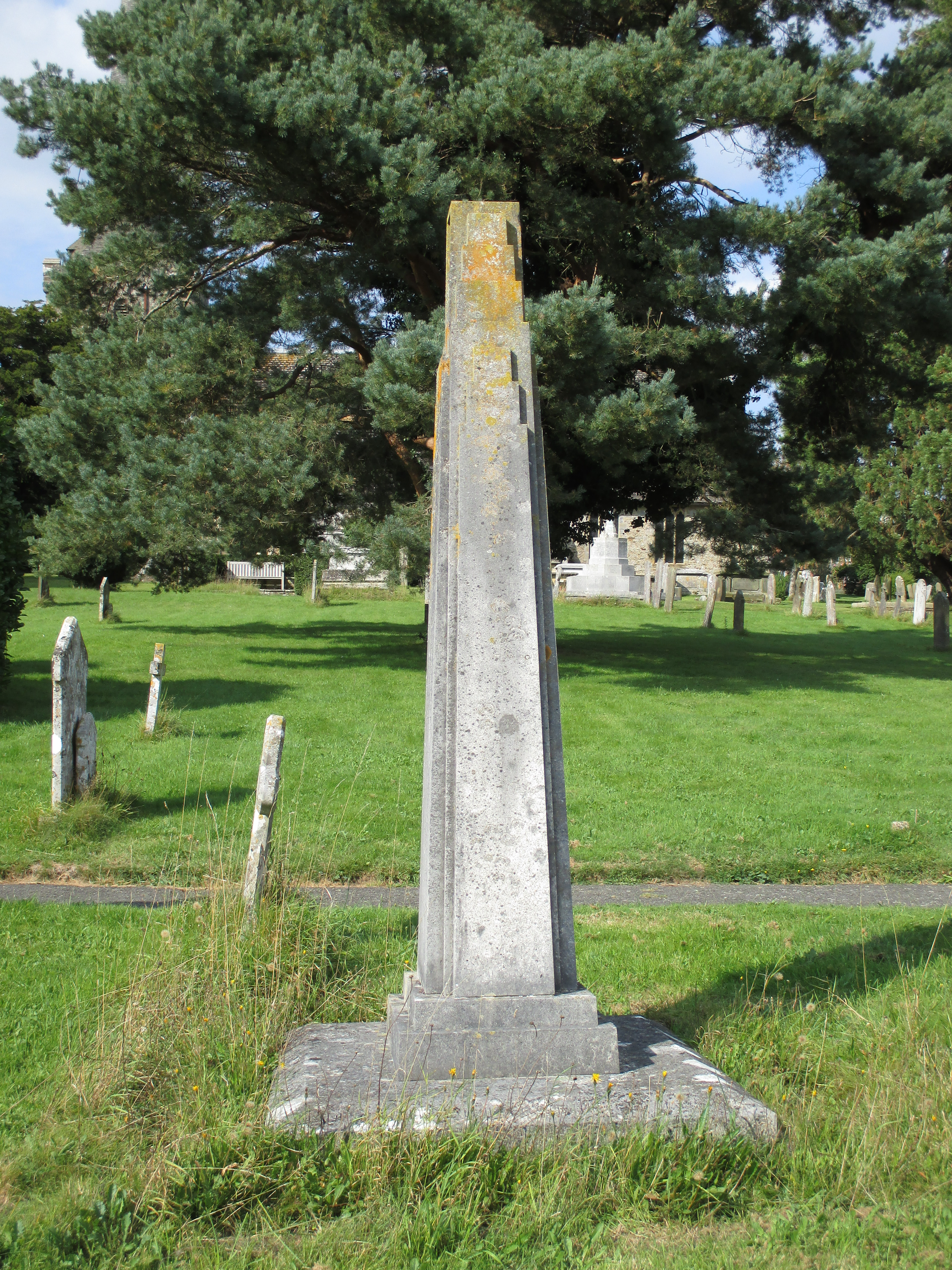
The obelisk raised over Kingsley's grave, Holy Trinity Church, Cuckfield.

On his return to the UK in 1857, Kingsley devoted himself to literature, and wrote several well-regarded novels, including Geoffry Hamlyn, set in Colebrooke, Devon, and Australia, which the late 19th-century English author George Gissing called "unliterary stuff", The Hillyars and the Burtons (1865), Ravenshoe (1861) and Austin Elliot (1863). Ravenshoe is generally seen as the best. Henry Kingsley married Sarah Maria Haselwood on 19 July 1864. In 1869, he moved to Edinburgh to edit the Daily Review, but soon gave this up and in 1870 became war correspondent for the paper in the Franco-German War.

Kingsley and his wife moved to Cuckfield, Sussex late in 1874, where Kingsley died of cancer of the tongue on 24 May 1876. Kingsley House at King's College School is named after him.

== Bibliography ==
- Leighton Court (1866)
- Mademoiselle Mathilde (1868)
- Tales of Old Travel Re-narrated (1869)
- Stretton (1869)
- The Boy in Grey (1871)
- Hetty and other Stories (1871)
- Old Margaret (1871)
- Hornby Mills and other Stories (1872)
- Valentine (1872)
- The Harveys (1872)
- Oakshott Castle (1873)
- Reginald Hetherege (1874)
- Number Seventeen (1875)
- The Grange Garden (1876)
- Fireside Studies (Essays) (1876)
- The Mystery of the Island (1877)
