= Efik literature =

Literature written in the Efik language

Efik literature (Efik: N̄wed ikọ Efịk) is literature spoken or written in the Efik language, particularly by Efik people or speakers of the Efik language. Traditional Efik literature can be classified as follows; Ase (commemorative poetry), Uto (epic poetry), Mbụk (consisting of myths, legends and historical stories), N̄ke (consisting of riddles, proverbs and tongue twisters) and Ikwọ (consisting of songs of various purposes such as religious purposes and mockery purposes). Other aspects of Efik literature include prose and drama (Mbre).

Before the arrival of the missionaries in 1846, much of what consisted of Efik literature was oral literature. By the late 1840s, Efik literature gradually transitioned into written form. The missionaries were instrumental in this transition. These Christian missionaries aided in the setting up of schools across Old Calabar. At these schools, the Efik were shown how to write in the Efik language using the latin alphabets. The earliest forms of Efik written literature were mainly of biblical genre and were developed by the early missionaries of the Church of Scotland mission. By the 1920s, Efik literature gradually transitioned into other written and non-biblical genres such as prose, drama and poetry. The period between the 1920s and 1970s saw an immense amount of growth in Efik literature.

At present, Efik literature is an important aspect of Efik language learning in schools within the lower Cross River region and is an integral part of the Efik written exams within the West African Examinations Council (WAEC) orbit. Students are recommended to study a range of Efik literary works to aid them in passing the exams. Among these literary works include Edikot N̄wed Mbuk series, Mutanda oyom Namondo, Ansa Udọ Enan̄, Sidibe and several others.

== Pre-missionary era ==
Prior to the arrival of the missionaries, what constituted Efik literature was mainly verbal forms of art. These verbal forms of art consisted of songs, litany of praises and story-telling dances. Efik songs had multiple purposes such as for worship, narrating of past events and mockery of crimes committed in the society. Songs were also associated with games, plays or secret societies. Societies such as Ekpri Akata would narrate ballads at Night that described the deeds of law-breakers in the society. By dawn, the community would arrest the law-breakers and punish them according to the severity of their crime. Efik dances such as Ekombi are also regarded as theatrical in performance as they reveal a tale of the deities, particularly, Ekpenyong and Ekanem. Epic poetry also known as Uto was an indigenous Efik art which was used for two major purposes such as the preservation of historical records and for the purposes of instruction or reenacting customary functions.

== Early era (1849-1929) ==
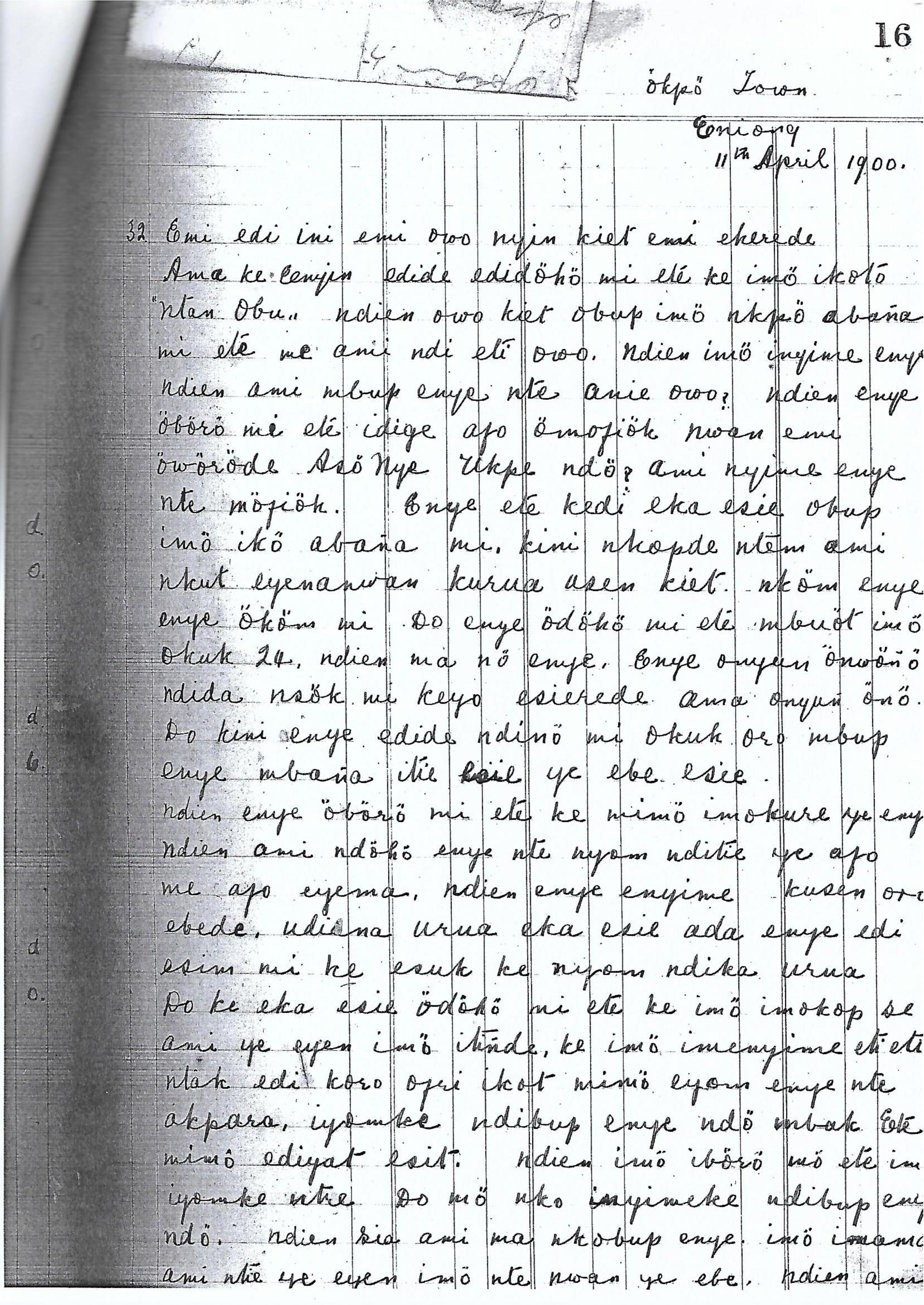
A diary entry from the year 1900 written in the Efik language.

The pioneers of early Efik written literature were the missionaries. The earliest missionaries departed from Liverpool on 6 January 1846 and set sail for Old Calabar. Among the first Christian missionaries to arrive Old Calabar were Rev. Hope M. Waddell; Mr. Samuel Edgereley, printer and catechist of the Jamaica mission; Mrs. Edgerley, wife of Samuel Edgerley; Andrew Chisholm, carpenter; Edward Miller, teacher; and an ex-slave boy George who later became a reverend. At their arrival on the 10th of April 1846, they made several attempts to understand the Efik language and transform it into writing. Two schools were set up, one at Creek Town and the other at Duke Town. Books for students were an urgent matter and this was resolved by Samuel Edgerley who introduced the first lithographic press. The first Christian mission was joined by several other missionaries amongst whom were Rev. Hugh Goldie who arrived in March 1847. The first Efik dictionary titled, A vocabulary of the Efik or old Calabar language: with prayers and lessons was written by Rev. Edgerley in 1849. A majority of other works that followed were mainly of Biblical genre. A few fictional stories were also introduced to students at Old Calabar and translated into the Efik language. Although religious books were quite popular in this era, a small number of quasi-literatures equally existed. Historical literature was often written in the Efik language by the Efik-speaking people. For example, the diarist Daniel Obiom Amaku records the founding of Okpo in Eniong Abatim in the Efik language. Letters of different sorts written in the Efik language were exchanged by the Efik in this early period.

=== Biblical Genre ===
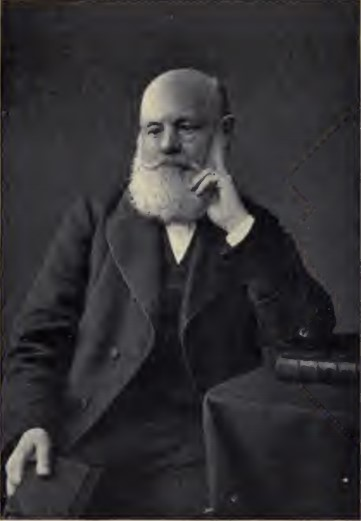
Rev. Hugh Goldie, Scottish missionary and author of several Efik texts

Christian religious denominations were instrumental in shaping the written literary foundation of the Efik language. The primary aim of the missionaries was to spread the Christian faith across Old Calabar and its surrounding communities. One of the first steps they took was to promote the literacy rate in Old Calabar. On the installation of the printing press at Old Calabar, a series of bible lessons were printed and made available for scholars and those who had learnt to read in English. Among the earliest Efik-written works published by the United church of scotland missionaries were

- Paul's epistle to the Hebrews (1860) - William Anderson
- Tiene Jesus (1860) - Alexander Robb
- The Proverbs of Solomon (1866) - William Anderson
- Nwed Mbume (1866)
- Psalms (1866) - Hugh Goldie
- The blind beggard by the wayside (1867) - William Anderson
- Mbuk Nkpo Emi Ekewetde Ke Obufa Testament (1852)
- History of Elijah
- History of Joseph
- Summary of Old Testament history

Among the denominations which paved the way for Efik literary development was the United Church of Scotland and the Catholic church. The Catholic church arrived old Calabar in 1903 on the invitation of Chief Essien Etim Offiong III. Among the earliest catholic texts written in the Efik language include:-

- Nwed mbume eke me Katolik (1908) - L. Lena
- Nwed ikwö eke Ufök Abasi me Katolik (1921) - J. Krafft

The early era of written Efik literature later produced a number of indigenous church hymn writers, notably among them was William Inyang Ndang who was sent to Scotland to be trained in religious music. Ndang organised and trained a number of choirs in churches at Calabar and produced a hymn book in this era, Iquo Itoro Edidem Zion (Hymns in praise of the king of Zion).

=== Non-Biblical ===
Although a lot of emphasis was placed on Biblical-related works in the early era of Efik literature, some non-Biblical genre still appeared in this era. The earliest known example of a written non-biblical piece can be traced to Rev Hugh Goldie's 1857 book, Principles of Efik Grammar. In this work, Goldie provides a written account of the creation of man and the world from the Efik perspective. It is believed that Non-biblical stories were also narrated in the Efik language to students by missionaries as Goldie. Among these stories include an Efik-version of Cinderella, Pied Pier and Alibaba. In this version, the fairy God-mother is replaced by Cinderella's stepmother whose ghost creates the items necessary for Cinderella to go to the ball. By the 1880s, a monthly paper in Efik, Unwana (light) was published by the mission press. The paper was liked by the literate public. A number of bards were also active during this era despite the fast spread of Christianity which was gradually having an adverse effect on saecular literature. Among notable bards of this era were Adiaha Etim Anwa, Uta Etim Asibong of Idua Asang, Atim Etayong, Okpok Ndem Ndem, Nne Eke Mkpananie and Etimanwan Etim Nsa.

== Second era (1929-1975) ==
The period between 1929 and 1975 was a golden age in Efik literary history. Although a number of written Efik works were released prior to 1929, Gerard points out that the government became instrumental in the literary growth of the Efik. In 1929, at the conference of the International institute of African Languages and Culture chaired by Professor William Welmers, it was agreed that the Efik language should be adopted as the only official and written indigenous language in the entire South-eastern region. In the same year, a meeting focused on the expansion of the Efik vocabulary was held at Old Calabar under the chairmanship of the Mr. E.M.Falk, the senior resident. Several recommendations were made with the intention of ensuring the standardization of the Efik orthography and development of new literature. Following the recommendation of the International institute of African Languages in union with the board of Education, Lagos, a new orthography was introduced. Progress was also being made by the catholic mission through Father Biechy who produced an Efik version of the Igbo catechism in 1929. Mr E. A. L. Gaskin, the inspector of schools in Nigeria was sponsored by the Nigerian government to undertake a course in phonetics at the University of London. On his return to Nigeria in 1930, he assembled a team of voluntary helpers consisting of Europeans, Efik and Ibibio people to begin work on the recommendations made by the 1929 conference on the Efik language. Gaskin aided in the establishment of the Efik Translation Bureau and was assisted by Revs J.K. Macgregor, E.E. Pritchard, Okon Efiong, J. Ballantyne, Father Meehan, Dr. Henshaw, Mr. J.W. Westgarth and several others. Gaskin also produced the work Twelve proverbs and one Folk-story from the Efik country and later resigned as the inspector of schools in 1932. Gaskin's position was taken by Robert Frederick G. Adams (R.F.G. Adams) in 1932. Members of the Efik translation bureau were instrumental in the publication of several Efik texts for schools. In 1933, the Bureau held a competition for best Efik literary work which was won by E.E. Nkana whose Mutanda Oyom Namondo came first prize. R.F.G. Adams joined the Efik translation bureau with the Igbo translation bureau on his assumption of office. Igbo and Efik were regarded as among the fastest-growing languages in southern Nigeria. The Nigerian Government was financially responsible for the publication of literary works particularly Nkana's Mutanda Oyom Namondo. The work of the Efik-Ibo translation bureau came to an abrupt end, but a dictionary was still being compiled by members of the defunct board and its first edition would later be published in 1939. The second era of Efik literature is particularly notable for the global recognition Efik literature attained. Many Efik writers were versatile in several literary genres but usually dominated particular genres or are remembered mainly for specific genres. For example, while E.N. Amaku is most popularly known for his contribution to Prose, he equally excelled in the area of poetry.

=== Prose ===
The tradition of narrating stories known as Nke is an age-old tradition among the Efik. Prior to the second era, the most common types of literary devices where short stories or fables. By the second half of the 1920s, the art of prose was gradually making an entrance into the Efik literary scene. Efik prose stood out from literature in the early era, it drew from cultural practices and traditional beliefs of the Efik people. Writers such as E. E. Nkana, E. N. Amaku and E. A. Edyang paved the way in this aspect of Efik literature.

==== Esien E. Nkana ====
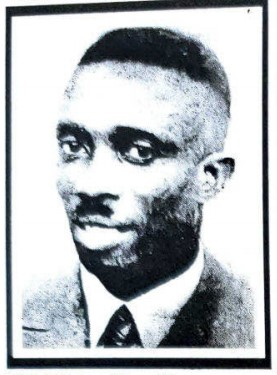
Esien-Ekpe E. Nkana, Author of the book, "Mutanda oyom Namondo"

Esien Ekpenyong Nkana was born into the Ambo house of Creek town. He undertook his formal education at Calabar and rose to become the headmaster of a school at Buea in Cameroon. Nkanga's greatest work was Mutanda oyom Namondo, a literary prose which emerged as one of the best entries in an Efik literary competition. This text was recommended by the advisory committee on Efik school literature and was approved by the department of Education for use in Schools. Mutanda oyom namondo narrates the story of Chief Mutanda who is on a quest to find his son, Namondo. The work brings to life the trado-religious beliefs of the Efik, depicting the influence of deities in the Efik society. Nkana's work has been re-published several times in two other languages apart from the Efik language. Due to its popularity, Mutanda Oyom Namondo was also converted to drama and has been staged in several parts of the world. Although this was Nkana's only Efik publication, it made an impact in the literary history of west Africa.

==== Ekpo Nta Amaku ====
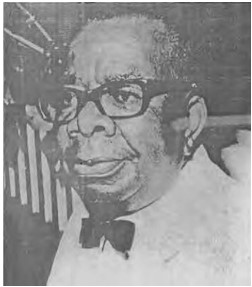
Ekpo Nta Amaku, Efik literary Author and Historian

Ekpo Nta Amaku was one of the major pioneers of modern Efik literature in the Efik goldern era. Born in 1898 to the family of Daniel Obiom Amaku of Okpo Town in Eniong Abatim, Amaku like many other young Efik had the privilege of formal education. Amaku's father was also a proficient writer whose diary is one of the best examples of non-biblical use of written Efik in the first era of Efik literary history. E.N. Amaku's literary career began in 1927. Among his earliest publications was Ufökuto Ikö Efik (1933) which contained several poetic stories and Kini kini, both of which were printed at Calabar. Amaku's works ranged from prose, poems, drama to short stories. His most popular work is the series Edikot Nwed mbuk which are used in nursey, primary and secondary schools. When the Efik translation bureau was resuscitated in 1945, Amaku contributed a number of pamphlets to the bureau's list of publications. According to Gerard, "Amaku remained the sole-standard bearer of Efik writing until 1952 when the first two plays- Unam öbön enyene kpa öbön (The royal meat must belong to the king) by Esien-Ekpe Okon and Sidibe by Ernest E. Edyang were printed in a single volume." E. N. Amaku's works also featured in international contests. In 1938, at the international institution of African languages literary competition, Amaku's prose titled, Abasi Ekpenyong, won first prize award. In the 21st century, Amaku's works still remain popular in schools and Efik language-learning institutions.

==== Ernest E. Edyang ====
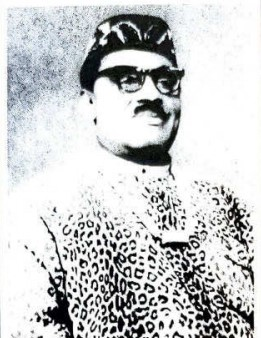
Chief Ernest E. Edyang

Ernest Etifit Edyang was from Ibeno, a community located in the present-day Akwa Ibom state. According to Aye, Edyang was "completely naturalized in Duke town". Edyang worked at Duke Town school and the Hope Waddell Training Institution. He was employed as a librarian at the Calabar Public Library. Edyang's works included The Bride price, The Emotan of Benin, Asibọn̄ Edem, Sidibe and several others. Of all his works, his most prominent within the Efik community are Asibọn̄ Edem and Sidibe. Sidibe is a reality based fiction. It is presented in the attitude of a serio comic drama. It thematically and synoptically mirrors, exemplifies and/or criticizes the various literary ironies, oddities and/or tragic paradoxes associated with some indigenous society's negative marriage decrees, customs, tradition and anti-social or cultural practices worldwide. The play features the triumph of fate over society's obnoxious, selfish and draconian policies that humanly or naturally dehumanize, limit or threaten humans' freedom of existence as well as widen the social discrimination gaps between rulers and the ruled, the nobles/royals and the commoners. The play further depicts the uncomfortable social gap between the rich and the poor. Sidibe was performed by the Calabar Cultural association at Ibadan in 1958. At the pan-African contests organised by an American University in 1963, Edyang's Sidibe won first prize for the Rosamond Gilder award. Asibọn̄ Edem, another notable work by Edyang, is based on social and political events which occurred at Old Calabar. It brings to life several myths of the Efik people particularly the belief in Akanga; a vow or promise made by an individual before a deity prior to his birth.

=== Drama ===
Drama became an important aspect of Efik literature in the second era. Like prose, much of Efik drama is drawn from historical events, traditional beliefs and cultural practices. Among pioneers of drama in Efik literature were Henry Efio'Okon Eyo, E. N. Amaku, E.E. Nkana. Efik drama has also received a lot of recognition in the international community. In 1970, at a literary contest held by Oxford University, Amaku's drama, Inyang Abasi Ndem, also won first prize award.

==== Henry Efio'Okon Eyo ====
Henry Eyo was one of the major dramatists of the second era. Among his earliest productions were Ekanem Ebito (1945); Adiaha Edem Ekpo Efiom (1946); and Eyamba V (1948). His drama Eyamba V centres on the life of King Eyamba V of Old Calabar and tries to reenact real-life events which occurred in the life of the king. The play had been reenacted several times in this era. After the visit of Queen Elizabeth II to Calabar in 1956, he wrote another play, Queen Elizabeth II albeit written in English. In another play, Uku M'ete Nyin (The Dignity of Our Fathers) written in 1958, he recounts several ancient Efik traditions. Eyo's uniqueness in Efik drama stems from his knowledge of indigenous customs and history. His drama some of which are drawn from Efik history, aim at satisfying the cravings of the Efik for knowledge of their ancient past. E. U. Aye describes Henry's position on prose and play as follows, "He does not believe that prose and play should be isolated from poetry but that one should be a necessary adjunct to the other."

=== Poetry ===
The art of Poetry which consisted of two types among the Efik i.e commemorative and epic poetry was transformed during the second era. Efik poems are usually made up of stanzas, with each stanza having four-lines. The written poetic style of the Efik is derived from the aboriginal style found in oral literature. Among the earliest poets in this era was E.N. Amaku whose poems include Ekwado, a collection of twelve short poems on everyday scenes and occurrences; Uwem do ke tinapa, based on the popular canned pilchards of the time; Kop! Enyọn̄ Asibọn̄ edem k'otop ikan̄, a poem on an episode which occurred among the Lebanese community in Calabar; and several other poems. Commemorative poetry became an important aspect of the coronation of Efik kings, chiefs and notable personalities in the society. Commemorative poetry aimed at praising a chosen personality by praising his exploits, reciting his ancient ancestry and declaring the exploits of his ancestors. Notable poets of this era were Elizabeth E. Archibong, Mbukpa E. Eyo, John I. Ikpeme, Efiom Efanga Ita and Ewa Efiom.

==== Elizabeth Eso Archibong ====
Born in 1900 to the Duke family of Old Calabar, Elizabeth Archibong was a broadcaster and a reputable poet who came into the limelight in the 1940s. Her poems were broadcast daily over the Nigerian Broadcasting Corporation. Her earliest poetical works were composed in the form of a conversation between Miss Esien Edet and herself. In this work, Miss Esien plays the part of a questionnaire. E.U. Aye describes her poetical style in the following words,

Mrs. Archibong's poetic style is simple and natural, and the amount of ornament added is only enough to recommend and render palatable the actual information conveyed. It is true didactic poetry. Yet on the other hand her poetry is not primarily intended to teach but to give pleasure. The artistic perfection of her workmanship is of the highest order, unique in its moral excellence, and rich in prudential maxims. She occasionally moves from the material to the abstract. Her poems are a manifestation of her strong personality: she is a devoted lover of her native soil: she takes an interest in her natural environment; she draws her philosophy from it and expresses her appreciation for its beauty and utility.

Elizabeth's poems have often touched on areas such as mythology, history and Efik settlements. In her poem Akpa Obio Canaan, she extols the beauty of the Calabar river and describes its value to the Efik people. Archibong recognises the importance of the river in Efik history as the passage through which commerce and western education gained entry into Old Calabar. When Nigeria became a republic in 1963, she released the poem, Republic and in the same year released Uduak Abasi (God's purpose) which she describes as irrevocable and which no man can alter.

==== Ewa Efiom ====
Ewa Efiom was another notable poet of this era. In his poem, Utom In̄wan̄, he recounts the old Efik passion for farming. Although the Efik are predominantly a fishing community, the poem expresses the old love for farming and its proceeds. The poem further expands into other aspects of agriculture such as poultry. A major feature of Efiom's poem is the deviation from four-line stanza's common among traditional Efik poetry to five-line stanza's. Efiom includes the names of several deities in his poem such as Anansa, Ukon Esuk and Esierebom or Sunko monko who are all considered the guardians of tillage.

==== Mbukpa E. Eyo ====
Mbukpa E. Eyo was another poet whose poem on Akpa Uyọk gained much attraction in Efik circles during this era. The poem is based on an old myth among the Efik of an Ndem priest known as Uyọk who lived for so long that he was regarded as obnoxious those whom he lived with. Mbukpa describes his jaw as so disfigured that it was only compared to that of a she-goat. The Efik clans confer on how to get rid of Uyọk. Ikoneto suggests selling him; Obutong disagrees and thinks it absurd that Uyọk would be worth any price. Ikọt Ukpa suggests Uyọk should be buried alive; Asikpo Ito refuses to partake in such a decision for fear of reprisal from the deity, Ukọn̄ Esụk. In the end, the suggestion of Efut Ikọt Ekpe is taken that he should be abandoned at the river bank at Nimba at low tide early in the morning. Tradition does not reveal if Uyọk is silently carried away or roughly bundled into the boat but when he realises what the Efik clans have done, he invokes the deities, Anansa, Ukọn̄ Esụk and Atakpọ Uruan, against his offenders to deny them the benefits of a ripe old age. The river where Uyọk is abandoned later became known as Akpa Uyọk (River Uyọk). The poem contains thirty-four stanzas with four lines in each stanza.

== Third era (1975-2000) ==
According to Duke, "there was a deliberate attempt by the South Eastern state government to marginalize the use of Efik language in spite of its long time existence as one of Nigerian Language subjects taught in schools and available in the West African School Certificate Examination." The threat to Efik was fought back through the establishment of associations aimed at preserving and promoting Efik language. Among these associations were the Institute of Efik Arts & Culture founded in 1971 and later on the Association for the Promotion of Efik Language Arts & Culture (APELAC). APELAC made great strides in preserving and promoting Efik culture in spite of the association's financial constraints. In the early years of this era, a committee aimed at reviewing and revisiting the Efik orthography was set up at the request of the council of vice-chancellors of Nigerian Universities. The introduction of the new orthography would mean a conversion of on-going Efik reading materials to the modern orthography. The present orthography was approved for use in schools by the Ministry of Education Cross River state on 1 September 1975. Books such as E.N. Amaku's Edikot Nwed mbuk series would be modified to accommodate the demands of the new orthography while newer texts emerged using this orthography. Among literary writers in the early years of this new era included Esien-Ekpe Edet Okon, Mary J. Edet, A.J. Udo-Ema, Etubom Thomas Efiom and Asuquo Otop.

=== Prose ===
==== Esien-Ekpe Edet Okon ====
Esien-Ekpe Okon's earliest literary work can be traced to the 1950s when he released the play titled, Unam öbön enyene kpa öbön. His most notable works were Uyi Efiọn̄ Esien (1976) and N̄kukunkpọyọriyọ (1985). Uyi Efiọn̄ Esien tells the story of a woman of noble birth described as proud, beautiful, industrious and wealthy. She is married to Akabom Ene, a man from a noble family in Creek Town. Akabom Ene passes away, leaving Uyi with an only son, Antigha Akabom Ene. Antigha Akabom is one of the most handsome men in the community. A contest between Creek Town and Obutong soon occurs, which Antigha takes part. The contest leaves Antigha bed-ridden for nearly an indefinite period. Uyi does everything she can to save her son, undergoing one ordeal to another to see if health can be acquired either with money or with another life. With all efforts to no avail, Uyi runs mad, losing her senses and is in a state of grief and pain. She mocks the missionaries at Creek town and ignores the British consul's threats. Another of Okon's works, N̄kukunkpọyọriyọ is a collection of historical and mythical stories of the Efik people specifically those of Eki extraction.

==== Thomas Efiom ====
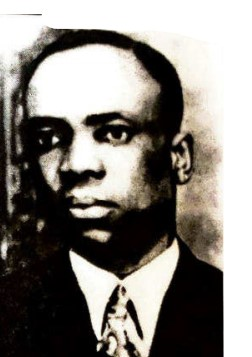
Etubom Thomas Efiom, MON

Thomas Efiom also known as Etubom Thomas Efiom was another major writer of this period. His work Ansa Udọ Enan̄ is used in schools across Calabar. The play centres around retribution/ the triumph of good over evil as it dramatically unfolded how an antagonist called Ansa Udọ Enan̄ suffered evil death for his crime against the state and the King's family from where the Prince emerged as the hero/lead protagonist in the play. As a melodrama, the play tells of a very wicked wizard named Ansa Udö Enan̄, who vindictively sent a ghost to kidnap and detain King Abasi Efiom's first daughter, Princess Ọkọhọ Abasi in the spirits land because the king forbade him against drunkenness. Fortunately, a hunter named N̄kpoto Abasi overheard when Ansa Udọ Enan̄ instructed the ghost to kidnap the Princess and reported it to the Kingdom who tried and found Ansa guilty as charged with an "evil death" penalty sentence. Ansa cleverly escaped from those who were mandated to execute his death and unfortunately, fell into a pit toilet and died, shamefully. Following the help of his Ndem mother, the King's first son, Abasi Effiom, despite suffered afflictions, stormed, freed and returned from the spirit land with his detained sister, Ököhö and Ansa's first daughter that was equally detained there. Thus, the play ends with joy as the kingdom rejoiced over Ansa's evil/shameful death and the freedom/safe return of the Princess and Ansa's first daughter from the spirit land.

=== Poetry ===
Although Efik poetry thrived in the second era of Efik literature, it gradually became relegated to special occasions. Among such occasions included community anniversaries, funeral of etuboms and prominent personalities, coronation events, chieftaincy-giving events and birthday celebrations. Over the decades, Efik poems become less mystical due to the loss of several Efik words. The absence of courses focused on Efik poetry in educational institutions has also contributed to the demystification of poems and gradually declining interest in the art. In spite of the difficulties faced by Efik poetry in the modern era, there have been a few poets in this era who have maintained the tradition of Efik poetry such as Atim E. Bassey, Peggy Nakanda, Chief Magnus Ekpenyong Oku and Etubom Ukorebi U. Asuquo. Some of these personalities have equally gained popularity from their works such as Atim Ekpo Bassey who wrote the poem, Ekpenyong Ekpenyon Odusu and also wrote the commemorative poem for Edidem Bassey Eyo Ephraim Adam III.

=== Other literary contributions ===
Outside the literary genres of prose, poetry and drama, several other contributions have been made to ensure the spread and growth of Efik literature. A major turning point in this era was the publication of the first Efik-English dictionary by an Efik indigene, Chief Efiong Ukpong Aye. Aye's dictionary was published in 1991 and later republished in 1999. Prior to Aye's Efik dictionary, several Efik-English and English-Efik dictionaries were published between 1849 and 1991. Aye's Efik-English dictionary brought to limelight several words which were not included in previous dictionaries and has been a great resource in Efik literary development. Mary J. Edet, another Efik literary author published an Efik language learning series which gained popularity in several schools across Calabar and its surrounding communities. Chief Mrs Grace Davis also published an Efik readers series titled "Koko" with volumes 1-5 and arithmetic for beginners titled "ETITI".

== Modern Era (2000-till date) ==
Since the beginning of the 21st century, the Efik language has faced several challenges which has led to its sharp decline as the leading language of the Cross River. A sense of patriotism to personal ethnic groups in the Cross River has gradually been growing. The Efik language has also had stiff competition with the English language which is slowly eroding the mother tongue of several Nigerian communities. Regardless of these difficulties, there have been a number of writers who have strived to ensure that Efik literature continues to expand. Among these writers include Engr. Ekpe Esien Ita, Chief Nkebem Nkebem, Philip Akoda.

=== Effiong Ukpong Aye ===
E. U. Aye was a renowned Efik historian who authored various historical works, such as “Old Calabar through the Centuries”, “Efik People”, and “A Learner’s Dictionary of the Efik Language”. His dictionary has been used in several institutions across the world and has contributed greatly to the study of Efik Language and Culture. He died in 2013.

=== Ekpe E. Ita ===
Engr Ekpe Esien Ita, an elder statesman was born in 1949 and attended the Hope Waddell Training Institution, Calabar. He has authored several books centred around History and the Efik Language, including “Cross River State @ 50 (1967-2017): the people and events that shaped it” and a series of books titled “Efik Proverbs”, which comprise 100 Efik proverbs and their respective interpretations.

=== Nkebem Nkebem ===
Chief Nkebem Nkebem Ebong is another notable Efik literary author who has made significant contributions to the advancement of modern Efik literature. Born in 1969, he grew up in Eniong Abatim, the home of E.N. Amaku. In 2014, Chief Nkebem Nkebem of Eniong Abatim in Odukpani published, Mbuk Nditọ Esịt Edịk which focuses on folktales from Eniong Abatim. Among other books published by Chief Nkebem include Edidemanwan, an Efik documentary; Efioekpo, a collection of essays on efik customs, traditions and history; Ebuk idiọk; Atakpa Ikọt Effiom and several others.
