= Timeline of Old Calabar history =

History of Old Calabar in modern day Nigeria

This is a timeline of Old Calabar history, comprising important historical events in the history of Old Calabar.

== 1668-1767 ==
| Year | Date | Event |
|---|---|---|
| 1720 | October | Pirates led by Captain Bartholomew Roberts attempted to obtain provisions at Old Calabar but the residents refused to trade with them. |

== 1767-1846 ==
| Year | Date | Event |
|---|---|---|
| 1820 | | Death of Chief Eyo Nsa of Creek Town. |
| 1834 | 14 October | Death of Great Duke Ephraim, Efiom Edem Efiom Okoho. |
| 1835 | | Eyo Honesty II crowned himself as king of Creek town. |
| 1842 | December | King Eyamba V and King Eyo Honesty II of Creek town respectively wrote to the British monarch to send Teachers, Missionaries and agricultural experts to Old Calabar to teach. |

== 1846-1902 ==
| Year | Date | Event |
|---|---|---|
| 1846 | | King Eyamba led an abortive punitive expedition against Umon. |
| 1846 | 6 May | Duke Town School, Old Calabar was opened with 20 pupils. |
| 1846 | 14 May | Death of King Eyamba V. |
| 1848 | | Kingship dispute erupted between Ntiero Offiong Okoho, Edem-Odo Duke Ephraim and Efio-Okoho Archibong Ekpo. |
| 1850 | | Ekpe law was proclaimed abolishing human sacrifices. |
| 1850 | | The presbyterian church, Creek town was built. |
| 1851 | January | The blood men organisation was formed to challenge immolation of slaves at funeral of noblemen and women. |
| 1851 | 28 February | Adam Duke alias 'King war' died. |
| 1851 | | Ekpo Edem alias 'Ironbar' died. |
| 1852 | 4 February | King Archibong I of Old Calabar died. |
| 1852 | | A great fire burnt King Eyo II's mansion and warehouse in Creek town. |
| 1852 | April | Edem-Odo alias 'Duke Ephraim V' was selected king but was only crowned later under the auspices of Sir John Beecroft in 1854. |
| 1853 | October | Essien Essien Ukpabio and Prince Eyọ Ita (later King Eyọ III) were baptised by Rev. Hugh Goldie. |
| 1855 | 19 January | Obutong was destroyed by Lt. I. W. B. Lyslanger, Acting Consul of H.M. Ship 'Antelope' due to funeral rites performed for the late king. |
| 1855 | 11 February | Ekpenyong Ekpenyong Ofiong Okoho (Mr. Young) died. |
| 1855 | 25 February | Duke town church was opened. |
| 1855 | 9 September | Creek town presbyterian church was opened. |
| 1856 | | The Court of Equity was formed for the security of Trade and settlement of trade disputes in Old Calabar. |

== Bibliography ==
- Duke, Orok Orok Effiom (2008), Great Calabar Chronicle: People, World Events and Dates, 1500-2007, Calabar: Clinprint International, ISBN 978-978-016-624-3
- Simmons, Donald C. (1968) [1st pub. 1956], "An Ethnographic Sketch of the Efik people", in Forde, Daryll (ed.), Efik Traders of Old Calabar, London: Dawsons of Pall Mall OCLC 67514086
- Talbot, Percy Amaury (1969) [1st pub. 1926], The People of Southern Nigeria: a sketch of their history, ethnology and languages, with an abstract of the 1921 census, vol. 1, London: Frank Cass & Co. Ltd. OCLC 716063900
- Simmons, Donald C. (1958). Analysis of the Reflection of Culture in Efik folktales (PhD). Yale University.
