= Eyo Honesty IV =

Obong of Creek Town

Obong of Creek Town
- Reign: 1862-1865
- Predecessor: Eyo Honesty III
- Successor: Eyo Honesty V

Obong Ebonko
- Predecessor: Eyo Nsa
- Successor: Eyo Honesty II (Note: Several years after the death of Eyo Nsa, Efiok Eyo (later known as Eyo IV), allowed his younger brother to become Obong of Creek town while he continued to be Ebonko. To make rulership easier for his younger brother, he passed on the stool of Ebonko to his younger brother and after the death of his younger brother, the stool went back to him)
- Died: 22 March 1865
Names
- Efiok Eyo Nsa
- House: Eyo Nsa House
- Father: Eyo Nsa

Eyo Honesty IV (né Efiok Eyo Nsa) popularly known as Father Tom was the ruler of Creek Town from 1862 until his death on 22 March 1865. Creek Town was part of the Efik city-states of the Old Calabar province in the Bight of Biafra. Born into the family of Chief Eyo Nsa, he was known at birth as Efiok. His father Eyo Nsa, alias Willy Eyo Honesty or Eyo Willy Honesty, was one of the prominent figures of the 18th century in Efik maritime history. Efiok was also the elder brother of King Eyo Honesty II.

== Early life ==
Not much is known about the early life of Eyo Honesty IV. Like many sons of Efik aristocrats, he would have been instructed in writing by Englishmen on the ships or in Duke town where his younger brother spent his youth. It was common knowledge that many sons of Efik traders in the 18th century, had visited England for Educational purposes and that schools had been setup in Calabar for the purpose of teaching children. On the death of Chief Eyo Nsa in 1820, Efiok Eyo had to take up the leadership of the Eyo ward in Creek town. He inherited his father's position in the Ekpe society as Ebonko, which was regarded as one of the most powerful positions in Ekpe at Calabar. Based on the principles of succession, Efiok was to become the obong of Creek Town but he chose his younger brother Eyo Eyo Nsa, who was wealthier and regarded as competent for the job. Latham asserts that despite Efiok's continued role as Ebonko, Eyo II had become the spokesperson for foreign affairs in Creek Town. As a result, he was able to directly negotiate with Europeans regarding commerce and trust, bypassing King Eyamba, who lacked the power to quell this challenge to his authority. Efiok supported the policies and laws placed by his brother such as the abolition of twin-killings and the fair treatment of twin mothers. It is also assumed that Efiok supported religious decisions made by Honesty II such as the abolition of Ekpenyong worship in Creek Town.

== Reign ==
After the death of King Eyo Honesty II in 1858, it was expected that his elder brother would be king but Eyo Ita, son of Eyo II was much preferred by the European traders. Eyo Ita also had the backing of the Ambo ward of Creek town who gave him their support because he was a grandson of Princess Inyang Esien Ekpe. Eyo Ita ruled for three years before his death in 1861. On the death of Eyo Ita in 1861, Efiok became the next Obong of Creek town and took up the name Eyo Honesty IV or Eyo IV. Despite Eyo IV's seniority and position as head of the Eyo Nsa house, the slaves would not accept him as their master and chose Eyo Okon, a slave and a close friend of the late Eyo Ita as their leader. Another hindrance in Eyo IV's reign was the refusal by the Ambo ward to recognise him as their leader. The Ambo ward believed one could not be the head of Creek town unless they were descended from any of the Ambo ancestors.

== Death ==
Eyo IV died on 22 March 1865 at Creek town.

== Bibliography ==
- Oku, Ekei Essien (1989), The Kings & Chiefs of Old Calabar (1785-1925), Calabar: Glad Tidings Press Ltd., ISBN 978-30541-0-4.
- Adams, John (1823), Sketches taken during ten voyages to Africa between the Years 1786 and 1800, London: Hurst Robinson and co.
- Nair, Kannan K. (1977). "King and Missionary in Efik politics, 1846-1858". Journal of African Studies. 4 (3): 243–280. OCLC 70803266.
- Imbua, David Lishilinimle (2013). "Robbing Others to Pay Mary Slessor: Unearthing the Authentic Heroes and Heroines of the Abolition of Twin-Killing in Calabar". African Economic History. 41: 139–158.
- Nair, Kannan K. (1972), Politics and Society in South Eastern Nigeria, 1841–1906: A Study of Power, Diplomacy and Commerce in Old Calabar, London: Frank Cass, ISBN 0-7146-2296-6
- Latham, A.J.H. (1973), Old Calabar (1600-1891): The Impact of the International Economy upon a Traditional Society, Oxford: Clarendon Press
- Duke, Orok Orok Effiom (2008), Great Calabar Chronicle: People, World Events and Dates, 1500-2007, Calabar: Clinprint International, ISBN 978-978-016-624-3
- Talbot, Percy Amaury (1969) [1st pub. 1926], The People of Southern Nigeria: a sketch of their history, ethnology and languages, with an abstract of the 1921 census, vol. 1, London: Frank Cass & Co. Ltd. OCLC 716063900
- Simmons, Donald C. (1968) [1st pub. 1956], "An Ethnographic Sketch of the Efik people", in Forde, Daryll (ed.), Efik Traders of Old Calabar, London: Dawsons of Pall Mall, OCLC 67514086
- Hart, A. Kalada (1964), Report of the Enquiry into the Dispute Over the Obongship of Calabar, Enugu: The Government Printer, OCLC 32857131.
