= Obong of Calabar =

Traditional ruler and custodian of the culture of the Efik people

The Obong of Calabar is the traditional ruler and custodian of the culture of the Efik people of Western Africa. The Obong is referred to as a natural ruler (because his kingdom predates the Nigerian state), treaty King (because he signed sovereign treaties with other world powers), grand patriarch of the Efik Kingdom and later bestowed with the additional title of defender of the Christian faith by a British monarch owing to the Obong's documented efforts in helping the spread of christianity in his domain. The Efik people are dispersed and settled in many parts of south eastern Nigeria and southwestern Cameroun but are mostly Centred in Calabar, capital of Cross River State. Calabar which was named by the Portuguese was locally known as Ata Akpa in local Efik language.

In modern times the Obong of Calabar is crowned twice, first traditionally at a sacred lodge known as efe asabo where different branches of Efik royal houses perform their esoteric roles during coronation and then in line with the Christian faith at the Duke Town Presbyterian church. The Obong's title defender of the Christian faith was given by previous kings of the Europeans during the colonial era. The crown, sword, orb and bible used during coronation are said to be gifts from Queen Victoria after a correspondence with a previous Obong, Previous Obong's had close relationships with the British colonial monarchy resulting at one time an Obong offered to marry Queen Victoria as one of his wives in order for both of them to rule over the black and white people. Their correspondence can be seen at the National Museum in Calabar.

The current Obong of Calabar is Edidem Ekpo Okon Abasi Otu V, He is the 78th monarch of the Efik people and has held the title since 2008. The Obong of Calabar is the current chancellor of Federal University of Agriculture, Abeokuta (FUNAAB).

== List of Obongs of the Efik Kingdom ==
- Eyamba V (1834-1847)
- Archibong I (1849-1852)
- Edem-Odo Edem Ekpo (1854-1858)
- Orok Edem-Odo (1880-1896)
- David James Henshaw V (1970-1973)
- Essien Ekpe Oku V (1973-1982)
- Bassey Eyo Ephraim Adam III (1982-1987)
- Adam Ephraim Adam I (1901-1906)
- Otu Ekpenyong Efa IX (1987-1989)
- Boco Ene Nkpang Cobham (1989-1999)
- Nta Elijah Henshaw (2001-2008)
- Ekpo Okon Abasi Otu V (2008-till date)
