= Ekpo Okon Abasi Otu V =

Obong of Calabar
- Reign: 11 July 2008 – present
- Predecessor: Nta Elijah Henshaw VI
- Born: 20 November 1949 (age 76); Calabar, Nigeria
- Spouse: Queen Ansa Ekpo Okon Abasi Otu
Names
- Ekpo Okon Abasi Otu
- House: Ukpong Mbo Otu
- Father: Okon Abasi Otu Ukpong Otu
- Mother: Ikwo Okokon Ansa
- Religion: christian

Ekpo Okon Abasi Otu V (Ukpong Otu Ukpong Mbo Otu Meseme Ukpong Ukpong Atai Ema Atai Iboku, born 20 November 1949) is the present Obong of Calabar and the 78th recognised monarch of the Efik People, he was crowned and officially recognised by the Government of Cross River State on 11 July 2008.

== Education ==
Prince Ekpo Okon completed his primary education at St. Patrick’s Convent and St. Mary’s Schools, obtaining his first school leaving certificate from the latter in 1963. He went on to receive his West African School Certificate from the renowned West African Peoples Institute (WAPI) in 1968, which was established by the late Professor Eyo Ita, the first Nigerian professor. At the age of 24, he earned a diploma in Telecommunications Engineering and was awarded the International Telecommunication Union's best student prize. The award was presented by the then Minister of Communications, General Murtala Muhammed, who later became the Nigerian Military Head of State.

== Journey to the throne ==
On the 11th of July, 2008, Ekpo Okon Abasi Otu was officially recognised as the new king by the Cross River State government and he was presented with a staff of office as Obong of Calabar by Senator Liyel Imoke who was the then State governor in a public ceremony held at the State's Cultural Centre Complex in Calabar. Finally, Ekpo Okon Abasi Otu V was presented before God in line with the tradition of Church Coronation suggested by the late Queen Victoria of Great Britain in 1878, at the Presbyterian Church of Nigeria, Duke Town Parish in December 2008. He was crowned by the late legendary Pastor Eyo Edet Okon of The Apostolic Church of Nigeria and admitted into the comity of world Christian Kings as the 78th recognized Monarch of the Efik Eburutu people.

== Controversies ==
This was contained in a declarative statement by the governor, through his Chief Press Secretary in November 2023, stating that the government recognised Ekpo Okon Abasi Otu V as the properly enthroned Obong of Calabar. The government further warned all interlopers, including a former Minister of Finance, Anthony Ani, to stop bickering as regards the throne.

== Personal life ==
Ekpo Okon is married to Princess Ansa (Veronica) Ekpo Okon Abasi Otu. They have seven children together.
