= Archibong I =

Obong of Calabar

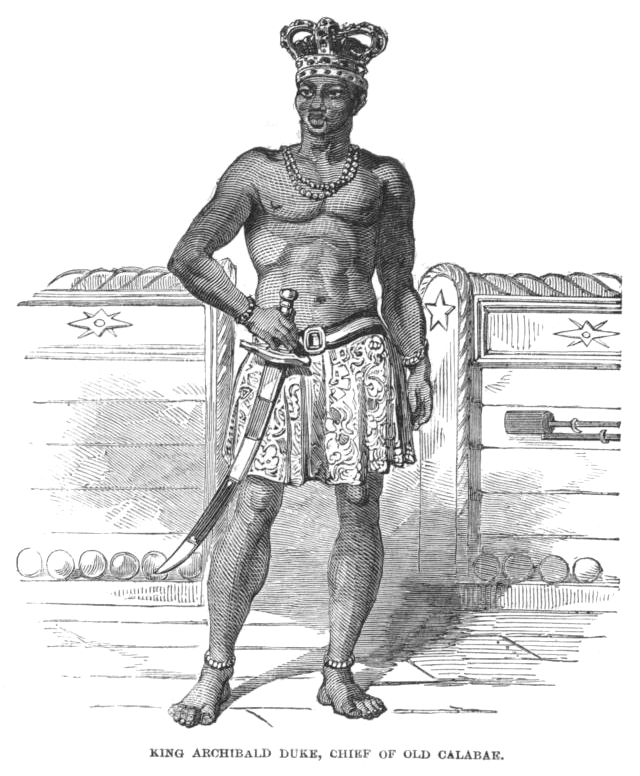

Obong of Calabar
- Reign: 1849 – 1852
- Coronation: May 28, 1849
- Predecessor: Eyamba V
- Successor: Edem-Odo Edem alias Duke Ephraim
- House: Asibong Ekpo House (Note: At this time, Asibong Ekpo house was a sub-house of great Duke House. The house later achieved its autonomy in 1886)
- Father: Asibong Ekpo
- Mother: Obuma

Archibong I (Efio-Okoho Asibong Ekpo Efiom Okoho Efiom Ekpo Efiom Ekpo) also known as Archibong Duke was the Obong of Calabar from 28 May 1849 to 4 February 1852. Born as Efio-Okoho, he was named after his Great Grandfather Efiom Okoho. His father was Asibong Ekpo and his mother was Obuma. Archibong is the anglicised form of the name Asibong.

== Selection for Kingship ==
After the death of Eyamba V on May 14, 1847, there was an interregnum of almost two years. A few months later, several persons declared their interest in filling the stool of the Obong of Calabar. Among the candidates were Ntiero Ekpenyong Ofiong Okoho (King Eyamba V's brother who was popularly known as Mr Young), Edem-Odo Edem Ekpo (Duke Ephraim), and Efio-Okoho Asibong Ekpo (Archibong Duke). According to Hope Waddell, it had been expected that King Eyo Honesty II would have been acknowledged King of all Calabar and therefore end the rivalries of the various towns. However, the old system of having two separate dominions was retained. Latham attests that Lieutenant Commander Selwyn was advised against the selection of King Eyo Honesty II as Obong of Calabar as wealth was his sole advantage. Although, Oku argues that though King Eyo Honesty II was the son of Chief Eyo Nsa, he was equally the son of Princess Inyang Esien Ekpe and was equally eligible via his maternal lineage. The desire to maintain status-quo may have been the preference of the British who were heavily involved in the Politics of Old Calabar at this time. So much was British involvement in the selection of the Obong that when it was suggested that King Eyo Honesty II be consulted on the most suitable choice for the Obongship of Calabar, the suggestion was dismissed by Lieutenant Commander Selwyn. Reverend Anderson gives the following account of Efio-Okoho's Selection stating:

After a good deal of deliberation it was considered that for his superior wealth, extensive trade and connection with the original family (Duke Ephraim's line) Archibong Duke is the proper successor to Eyamba and rightful king of Duke Town[...]All the shipmasters voted Archibong as king; Mr Edgerley and I, the only missionaries present, did not vote at all. From Mr Young’s age, ability, and influence, it was agreed that he be recognised as premier. The meeting was held in our school room; and Lieutenant Selwyn having got all the information he wanted, at his request I sent for Archibong and Mr Young. Both came attended by large retinues. None were allowed to enter the schoolroom but the two chiefs[...] After a little talk, Mr Young gave up all claims to the Kingship and accepted the premiership[...]

While Efio-Okoho held the office of Obong of Calabar, Ntiero Ekpenyong succeeded Eyamba V as the sixth Iyamba in the Ekpe Efik Iboku. Furthermore, Ntiero held an office similar to Prime Minister of state during King Archibong's reign. Although, the two men never agreed with regard to policy and held contradicting views over political and social issues. After the election of Archibong I as the Obong of Calabar, he (Archibong) visited the Teaser where he was received with a royal salute of twenty-one guns.

== Reign ==
According to Aye, it is difficult to assess Archibong I's rule due to the brevity of his reign. Indeed, King Archibong's reign was a short one, having only reigned for four years. Archibong I was described as "Young, Inexperienced and rash". Archibong I was not very skilled at settling disputes. He would often apply the mosaic law of an eye for an eye or a tooth for a tooth in a bid to settle a dispute swiftly.

Hope Waddell documents a scenario describing Archibong's style of settling disputes,

Mr Anderson found two men fighting with big sticks in the mission ground and brought them to him. One of them, who had got a broken head and was covered with blood was heard as complainant; and when he had done, Archibong would hear no more, but at once settled the business. "He broke your head," said he "and why did not you break his back ? Be off !" They were off in a moment. Turning to the missionary, he said, "That be Calabar Fashion. When one man hurt tother, tother must hurt him back worse; and if a third man put in his mouth, shoot him."

The mosaic law was one of many customs similar to the Hebrews which was noticed by Rev. Hope Waddell.

Consul Hutchinson describes Archibong I stating,

[...]the king was one of the most extraordinary specimens of sable humanity I ever met. He could neither read nor write the English language, but spoke it in a very imperfect gabble; and, go to his house whenever you would, he was nearly always in that condition in which he might be expected to agree with the sentiment of Sancho Panza, "Blessings on the man who first invented sleep."

Hope Waddell is said to have written of him stating, "Kingship sat very easily of him".

== Death ==
King Archibong I died on 4 February 1852. On the death of King Archibong I, succession disputes arose and several people were accused of having a hand in his death. King Archibong's mother known as Obuma accused several persons of having a hand in her son's death and forced them to take the dreaded Esere bean nut. Several persons died due to the ordeal. Obuma further demanded that the prospective candidates of the Obongship stool undergo the ordeal. The entire ordeal was halted when Mr Young insisted that Obuma must equally undergo the ordeal. Obuma refused to undergo the ordeal and threatened to blow up Duke town with six kegs of gunpowder if anyone forced her to undergo the ordeal.

== Ancestry ==
Ancestors of Archibong I

5. Efiom Okoho
7. Efiom Ekpo
6. Okoho Efiom
4. Ekpo Efiom
2. Asibong Ekpo
1. Archibong I
3. Obuma

== Bibliography ==
- Oku, Ekei Essien (1989), The Kings & Chiefs of Old Calabar (1785-1925), Calabar: Glad Tidings Press, ISBN 978-30541-0-4.
- Marwick, William (1897), William and Louis Anderson: A Record of their Life and Work in Jamaica and Old Calabar, Edinburgh: Andrew Elliot, 17 Princes street.
- Hart, A. Kalada (1964), Report of the Enquiry into the Dispute Over the Obongship of Calabar, Enugu: The Government Printer OCLC 32857131.
- Duke, Orok Orok Effiom (2008), Great Calabar Chronicle: People, World Events and Dates, 1500-2007, Calabar: Clinprint International, ISBN 978-978-016-624-3.
- Waddell, Hope Masterton (1863), Twenty-Nine Years in the West Indies and Central Africa, London: Nelson & Sons OCLC 862147545.
- Nair, Kannan K. (1972), Politics and Society in South Eastern Nigeria, 1841–1906: A Study of Power, Diplomacy and Commerce in Old Calabar, London: Frank Cass, ISBN 0-7146-2296-6.
- Hutchinson, Thomas J. (1858), Impressions of West Africa, London: Longman, Brown, Green, Longmans & Roberts OCLC 1046641528.
- Latham, A.J.H. (1973), Old Calabar (1600-1891): The Impact of the International Economy upon a Traditional Society, Oxford: Clarendon Press.
- Aye, Efiong U. (1967), Old Calabar through the Centuries, Calabar: Hope Waddell Press OCLC 476222042.
- Jeffreys, M.D.W. (1935), Old Calabar and notes on the Ibibio Language, Calabar: H.W.T.I. press
