= Eniong Abatim =

Town in Cross Rivers, Nigeria

- Community
- Eniong Abatim
- Location in Nigeria
- Country: Nigeria
- State: Cross River
- LGA: Odukpani
- Time zone: UTC+1 (WAT)

Eniong Abatim (Efik: Eniọñ Abatịm) is a community located in the present-day Odukpani Local Government Area of Cross River state of Nigeria. The people speak the Efik language.

== Etymology ==
In several pre-colonial documents, Eniong Abatim was known as 'Enyong'. Although some documents such as Edward Bold's The Merchant's and Mariner's African Guide (1822), spell it as "Aniung". In Rev. Hope Waddell's book, Twenty-Nine Years in the West Indies and Central Africa (1863), it is spelt "Iniong"; and in J.B. King's expeditionary accounts in 1841, it is spelt "Innieong". The modern and appropriate spelling in the Efik language which is spoken by the Eniong is Eniọñ. Eniọñ is translated as 'the clever ones' and comes from the root verb 'niọñ', to know.

== Geography ==
To the north, it shares borders with Abia State, while to the west it is bordered by Akwa Ibom State. Its northeastern boundary adjoins Biase Local Government Area, and to the south, it is bordered by the Cross River.

== History ==
During the Atlantic slave trade, Eniong Abatim was a major supplier of slaves and oil.
