= Ekei Essien Oku =

Nigerian librarian, historian and writer (1924–2004)

- Born: 22 January 1924; Calabar
- Died: 16 October 2004 (aged 80)
- Education: Queen's College, Lagos and North Western Polytechnic
- Occupation: Chartered librarian
- Known for: writing Nigerian history
- Spouse: Chief Essien Oku 1956
- Children: one son, two daughters

Ekei Essien Oku (22 January 1924 – 16 October 2004) was a Nigerian librarian, historian, and writer. She was one of the first chartered librarians in Nigeria and the first woman to be a Chief Librarian in Nigeria. She has published her research into the history of Nigeria based on the account of missionaries who recorded dates on the formation of towns in the 17th century.

== Life ==
Oku was born in Calabar in January 1924. She was educated in Nigeria, including Queen's College, Lagos. She first worked as a teacher before she went to work as a librarian and she was sent to London to study at the North Western Polytechnic (now part of the University of North London). She returned to Nigeria where she became the first woman from Nigeria to become a chartered librarian in 1953. This was just two years after the first man, Kalu Chima Okorie, in 1951. She was the first woman chief librarian in Nigeria in 1964. and she held that position in Calabar and in Lagos.

Oku researched and wrote, "The Kings and Chiefs of Old Calabar (1785–1925)". The book was published in 1989. She studied the records taken by missionaries including the time of the slave revolt and she believed that the slaves supported their masters. Although the slaves wanted freedom once their masters were killed, they were keen to find justice or revenge for their masters' killers.

Oku was profiled in 2000 by the BBC in a half-hour study of her life and work "African Perspective". She died on 16 October 2004, at the age of 80.
