= Eyo Honesty II =

Obong of Creek Town

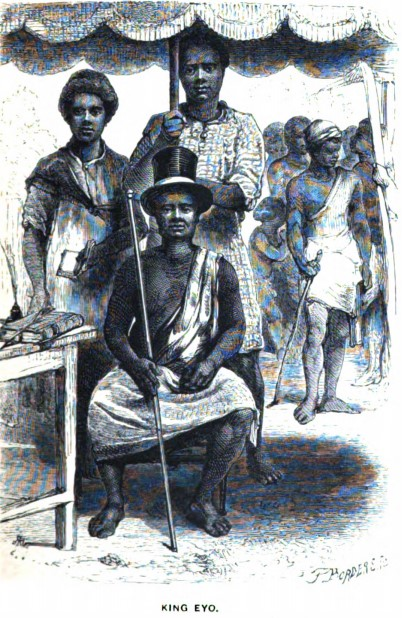

Obong of Creek Town
- Reign: 1835-1858
- Predecessor: Ekpenyong Nsa
- Successor: Eyo Honesty III

Obong Ebonko
- Predecessor: Efiok Eyo Nsa
- Successor: Eyo Honesty III
- Died: 3 December 1858
- Issue: Eyo Honesty III
Names
- Eyo Eyo Nsa
- House: Eyo II House
- Father: Eyo Nsa
- Mother: Inyang Esien Ekpe

Eyo Honesty II (né Eyo Eyo Nsa; c. 1788–1858) was the ruler of Creek Town from 1835 until his death on 3 December 1858. Creek Town was part of the Efik city-states of the Old Calabar province in the Bight of Biafra. Eyo was born into the family of Eyo Nsa and Inyang Esien Ekpe. His father Eyo Nsa, alias Willy Eyo Honesty or Eyo Willy Honesty, was one of the prominent figures of the 18th century in Efik maritime history. His mother, Princess Inyang Esien Ekpe, was the daughter of Esien Ekpe Oku (alias Iyamba I).

King Eyo Honesty's reign saw changes to the religious life of Creek Town and Old Calabar. He is credited as having aided in the invitation of the Christian missionaries to the Old Calabar region, which further aided in the establishment of Christianity across the Cross River region. Eyo was also instrumental in the abolition of practices such as the killing of twins and human sacrifices. On his death, he was succeeded by his son Eyo Eyo Ita, who became King Eyo Honesty III.

== Early life ==
Born as "Eyo Eyo Nsa", he was named after his father Eyo Nsa. Although his exact date of birth is unknown, Eyo was cited to have been born in 1788 by an epitaph located on a tower of the Creek Town Presbyterian Church. However, Oku argues that the period in which Eyo's mother's hand was offered in marriage to his father was prior to 1767 when the Obutong massacre occurred. Her hypothesis is based on the circumstances surrounding the union of Eyo Nsa and Inyang Esien Ekpe. According to tradition, Chief Eyo Nsa won the fair hand of Princess Inyang Esien Ekpe after decapitating the pirate, Akpa Akpakpan Uko of Mbiakong. In his youth, Eyo worked as a cabin boy under English captains and had accompanied them during the era of the triangular trade. It was during this time that he learned to speak and write the English language. He also learned the ways of the slave trade and how to do business which would benefit him as a ruler later on in life. After his father died in 1820, his family fell upon hard times and Eyo found himself in the employment of his father's rival, Efiom Edem (Alias Great Duke Ephraim). Working for Great Duke Ephraim in Duke Town, allowed him to improve his English and trade skills while establishing himself. Narrating his early beginnings, Eyo had informed Rev. Hope Waddell,

When young I was nobody, for I was poor; and it was long before I set up as a gentleman. I put my mind to my trade and worked; at first a little, and then more. What profit i made I put down. When ships come I trade with their money, and when they go away I trade with my own... And now pass every man (in wealth) in all Calabar.

According to Magnus Adam-Duke, Eyo became conditor (founder) of his ward in 1834, after the death of Great Duke Ephraim. This was one of the first steps he undertook to liberate the late Duke's hold on Creek Town. Goldie documents that Eyo made attempts to reconcile the warring factions in his father's household. One of the ways he is said to have done this states, "He went out into the public street, and lifting a handful of sand, he scattered it, proclaiming that thus he cast all strifes to the wind, and called upon all who had retired to the country districts to return and rebuild. Another tradition upholds that due to the curses inflicted on the land by the Ndem during his father's reign, barrenness was rife in the town. Thus, Eyo Eyo Nsa purged the town of this curse by performing the following ritual: "He killed cows and left them at every corner of the town for vultures to feed upon. As would be expected, thousands of these birds bore down on the carcasses and from then on there was a rich "Harvest of Babies"." Eyo's actions were based on the Efik belief that the vulture is the harbinger of good fortune.

== Kingship ==
The death of Eyo Nsa left a leadership vacuum in Creek Town. Eyo Nsa was one of the legendary figures that aided in the strengthening of Creek Town's economic power in the lower Cross River. Chief Eyo Nsa was succeeded by Ekpenyong Nsa, the younger brother of Eyo Nsa. Ekpenyong Nsa was described as "a rash, proud and headstrong man" who squandered the family's wealth. After the death of Ekpenyong Nsa, it was decided that a new king should be installed. Although Eyo Eyo Nsa's elder brother Tom Eyo was the head of his father's ward, Tom chose to concede the position of head of Creek Town to Eyo. Tom's decision was based on the fact that Eyo Eyo Nsa was the most qualified man to rule the town by virtue of his wealth, experience, contacts, business knowledge and literacy. Eyo Eyo Nsa was crowned in around 1835 and took up the name "Eyo Honesty II". Rev. Hope Waddell gave an account of the events that took place after his coronation stating,

He proclaimed a feast, invited the country to be his guests and for two weeks entertained all who came, by daily feasts and shows. At last he took his seat, crowned in the marketplace, surrounded by his famiLy, friends and armed bands, addressed the assembly and was proclaimed rightful King.

The proclamation of a new king at Creek Town is said to have displeased King Eyamba V, who did not like the idea of the presence of two kings in the region. Eyamba V sent emissaries to inform them of his displeasure. Hope Waddell records Eyo's response:

...From his residence to the town-house; he had the streets laid with hundreds of boxes of brass and copper rods, "current money of the merchants" worth each about £5 sterling. On these, he walked without putting foot to ground and told the messengers what his march had proved that he had money enough to be king and needed no leave from Eyamba.

King Eyamba V carried on with his refusal to acknowledge Eyo as king for a while and forbade captains within the area from saluting Eyo when he visited their ships. Anyone who refused Eyamba's decree was fined. On the other hand, King Eyo refused to be disrespected and would not trade with anyone who withheld his honours. King Eyo's trade is said to have been the most important in the country, therefore it was difficult to heed the commands of Eyamba V. The last straw was when Eyamba threatened to "Catch and Chain" Eyo. On hearing of King Eyamba's threat, Eyo discreetly prepared his naval forces and sailed unannounced and arrived unexpectedly to Duke Town. He instructed his team to not attack until he had given a signal. With a few bodyguards he walked to Eyamba's house. King Eyamba was thrilled by Eyo's visit but his countenance changed when Eyo informed him that he had come to give Eyamba the opportunity of chaining him. King Eyamba was surprised and tried to explain that it was a joke and encouraged Eyo to drink with him. King Eyo refused his request and departed to his ship, sailing to Creek Town and leaving Duke Town, Eyamba and his people confused and surprised at his audacity.

== Reign ==
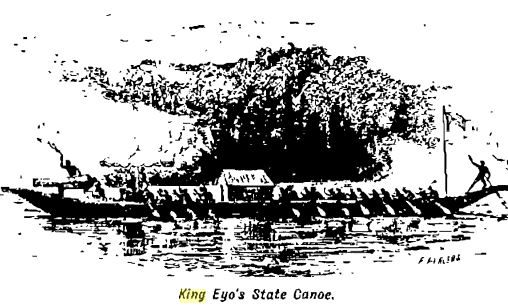
"King Eyo's State Canoe". According to Hope Waddell in the mid 19th century, King Eyo possessed a fleet of trade canoes armed with fixed and swivel cannons. The King's canoe had a mounted large calibre gun at the front, as the canoe and water absorbed the recoil when it fired.

The period from 1807 to 1840 marked a turning point in the Economic history of Old Calabar. Although the slave trade was abolished in 1807, the exportation of slaves from old Calabar was still on-going until 1840. There was also an increase in other exports such as oil, barwood, due to the decreasing popularity of slave acquisition. Creek Town like many other towns of the old Calabar region had played its role in the exportation of slaves to the new world. Thus, when Eyo II became ruler of Creek Town, he carried on the tradition of his father and grandfather. In 1840, Commander Raymond paid a visit to King Eyo II and King Eyamba V with the anti-slave trade treaties which Nair states were willingly signed by both kings. King Eyo II and Eyamba V realising the change in the economic tides of the region sent letters to the British requesting for teachers and missionaries to Old Calabar to establish schools and teach the people, commerce and Christianity. Their requests were heeded and the first missionaries arrived Old Calabar in April 1846. Thus, Eyo's reign marked the beginning of a new era in the history of the lower Cross River region.

=== Political life ===
Old Calabar was divided into a small number of towns which were all under the authority of the Ekpe society. The title of the vice-chairman of the fraternity was known as Ebonko. This office was held by Eyo II's father, who inherited it on the death of Esien Ekpe Oku. Eyo Nsa's inheritance of the grade was as a result of his marriage to Eyo's mother who was the daughter of Esien Ekpe Oku. Eyo II equally came to inherit the office held by his father. Eyo also appended the Okpoho grade to the list of Ekpe grades. Eyo II's position within the Ekpe society made him a powerful force within Old Calabar. Through his position as Obong Ebonko, he was able to enforce laws within his territory. Thus, without Eyo's position in the Ekpe society, it would have been difficult to enforce treaties that pushed for the abolition of funeral sacrifices, twin killings, witch trials and other practices.

Eyo II sought a peaceful approach towards handling interethnic affairs except there was no other option but to go to war. An example of Eyo's handling of neighbouring affairs within the Cross River was his improvement of Old Calabar and Umon relations. Umon is an island situated in the middle of the Cross River. During the pre-colonial era, it was difficult for people to freely transport goods along the Cross River without paying fees to the ethnicities located along the Cross River. Eyamba V had attempted to bully the Umon people to obedience severally but the people were resilient and would not give in to any form of intimidation. Eyo II chose to settle matters with the Umon people amicably by first, sending out a peace mission to Umon. According to Hope Waddell,

About sixty canoes followed Eyo and his Chiefs to Bosun. Most of them had each a large gun, mounted on a strong frame in the bows, and a little deck house in the middle for its owner gaily painted with ensign in the stern. Eyo led the way himself in a six oared gig rowed not by slaves but by young gentlemen of the best families in the land. Some of his canoes which followed were very large, sixty or seventy feet long and five or six broad, paddled by thirty men and carrying also bands of armed men. They had large guns both bow and stern and were ballasted with cannon balls.

When asked if the people of Umon would not feel alarmed by the presence of armed forces in the area, Eyo II pointed out that the palm fronds which surrounded the Ekpe canoe signified that they came in peace. Eyo negotiated with the chiefs of Umon and they collectively came to an agreement that Creek Town would pay an annual dash to certain chiefs at Umon to ensure trade along the area, with the people of Creek Town being undisturbed thereafter. Eyo's influence was felt in neighbouring communities within Old Calabar. Although he refrained from dabbling in the activities of other towns, he did not refuse to come to their aid when they required his wisdom. Such was the case when Duke Town was in anarchy after the death of King Archibong I. The missionaries appealed to King Eyo to come over to Duke Town and aid in the restoration of order to the town. King Eyo responded that he could not interfere in the affairs of Duke Town until their own headmen requested his presence. King Eyo eventually visited Duke Town. According to Hope Waddell,

The same day that Eyo went to Duke Town, the missionaries also assembled there for united prayer, on behalf both of the country and the mission; and when he landed they went to meet and salute him. The sight which presented itself was an uncommon and impressive one. At one side of the market-place sat King Eyo under his grand umbrella, guarded by a moderately numerous, but very select band of armed men. He had brought only his usual retinue of three canoes following his boat; but they were filled with picked people... The situation was critical. A rash word or act might have made open war in the town before night. To restore order it needed a self-command and tact equal to the boldness with which Eyo had presented himself with a small guard in the face of that armed multitude. He accomplished that object, however; and before night those wild hordes had retired to the plantations, all parties having sworn mbiam, that no more persons should die, in any way, for the late king.

Reverend Anderson noted that Eyo had performed the feat of restoring peace and order to Duke Town with great skill as had he not done so, the crisis would have escalated even with Eyo's presence. This event further heightened the respect the people of Duke Town and other towns had for Eyo. Another incident that is testimony to Eyo's influence across the lower Cross River was his mediating of a crisis at Mbiabo Ikot Offiong. When the community of Ikot Offiong was placed under an Ekpe ban, they sought the assistance of Eyo II to intercede on their behalf. Eyo's intervention averted a war that would have occurred between the combined forces of Ikoneto and Duke Town.

=== Domestic affairs and Family Life ===
King Eyo like many other wealthy men of Old Calabar owned a prefabricated wooden two-storey building which was shipped from Liverpool. Such houses were owned by wealthy men together with the Calabar-styled native houses. Eyo's pre-fabricated building was described as, "of wood, with a front verandah, two storeys high, and outside stairs, crowded with good furniture of all kinds,-tables, side-board, sofas, chairs, chests of drawers, clocks and all going, barrel-organ, chinaware, pictures, chandeliers and mirrors of all shapes and sizes". Eyo also owned a residential quarters specifically designed for his wives. The residential quarters is described by Rev. Hope Waddell as,"...nine court-yards surrounded by some low-thatched buildings each opening into the other... The walls of the buildings were tastefully painted in beautiful native patterns with native pigments, and the King's wives were the artists". Eyo received guests in his storey-building while the residential quarters was inhabited by his wives and domestic servants. He equally kept trading goods at his residential quarters.

Although not much is known about Eyo's marital life, many texts prove that he had several wives. The wives of many Efik kings were often left to do as they please as long as they obeyed the laws of the land. Eyo II believed in the laws of the land but was never quick to wholeheartedly accept laws which he regarded as "Fool things". On one occasion, one of Eyo's wives (the mother of his two sons) left for her father's home town in the Ibibio country and is said to have had an affair with one of the chiefs of the town. On learning of this incidence, King Eyo kept the matter secret and secretly had his wife's mate and the "go-between" brought to Creek Town where they were drowned in the river. His wife was spared for her children's sake but she was banished to the King's plantations for life. Another incident occurred in 1851 involving Ima, another of King Eyo's wives. Ima secretly left the residential quarters and into the streets to quarrel with a girl who had provoked her. She was spotted and heard by the King. Eyo ordered that the yard gates be closed and that she should never be allowed entry into the quarters. No one came to Ima's aid except the missionaries i.e. Mrs Waddell and Miss Miller who were friends with the King's wives. Mrs Waddell pleaded with King Eyo for days until Eyo forgave Ima but had her banished from his home.

King Eyo II had many children. Some of his children included Ansa, Eyo (who later became Eyo Honesty III), Inyang, Ako, Esien, Amayo, Ekpenyong. Ansa was his eldest daughter also known as the Adiaha and Eyo was his eldest son also known as the Akpan. Hope Waddell describes Ansa as, "being nearly blind, had been greatly indulged, and grew up proud and headstrong". Ansa is said to have been an ardent believer in native customs. She shared the same mother with Eyo, the son of Eyo II. Inyang, the second daughter of Eyo was described as "an imperious woman". Like Ansa, Inyang was an ardent believer of native customs. Ako, the third daughter of Eyo was described as self-willed and showed promise as an academic. By 1850, Ako was regarded as the cleverest student of her age and in some aspects had a mind like her father. Amayo, another of Eyo's daughters was described as "Pretty lively". Ekpenyong, another of Eyo's sons is said to have been,"careless... always averse to school and was full of excuses for it".

== Foreign Relations ==
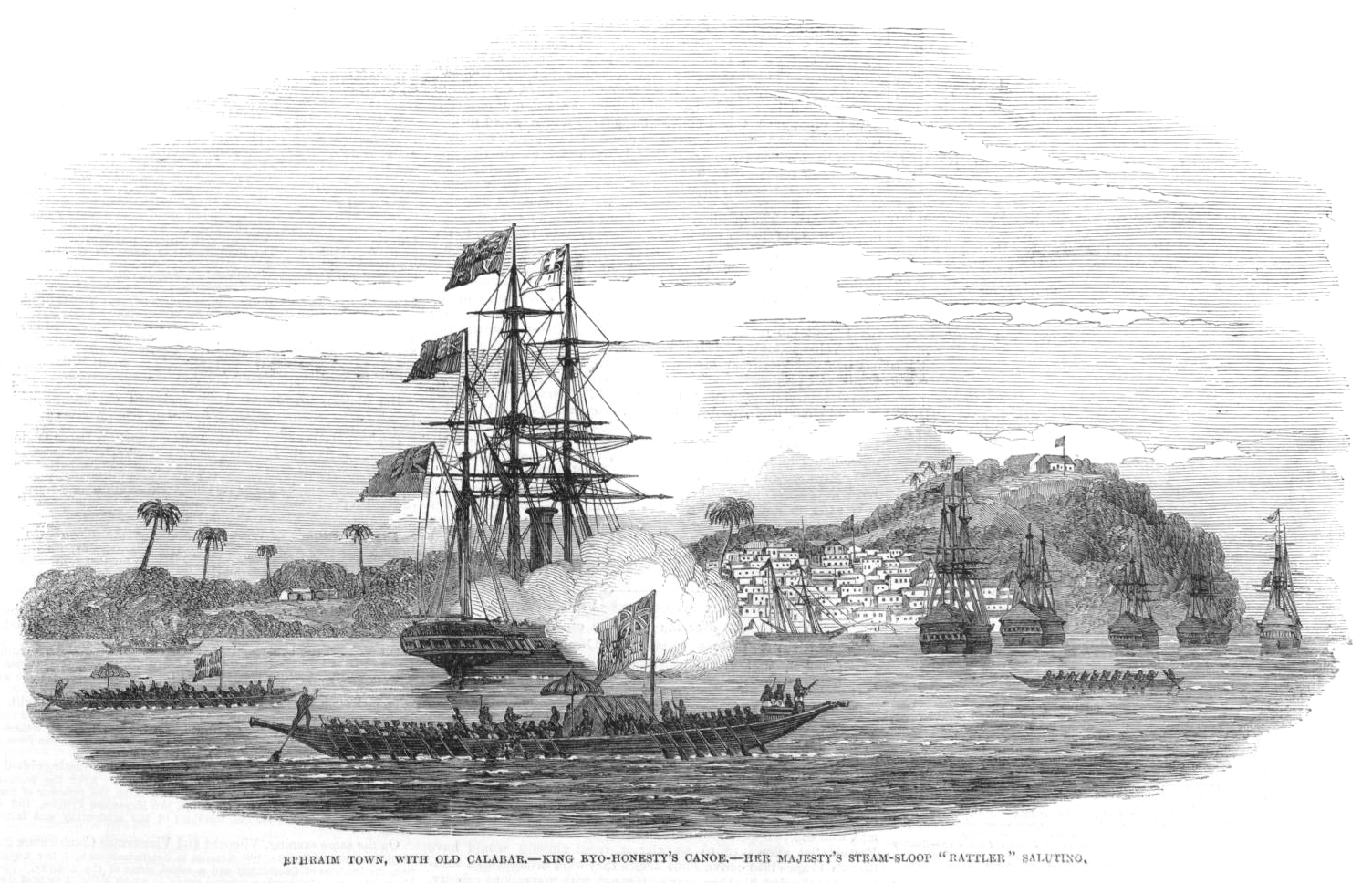
King Eyo's canoe with HMS Rattler saluting in background

King Eyo II's father Eyo Nsa was renowned for his honesty among foreign traders, which was why he was nicknamed "Honesty", a name which is now a family name at Creek Town. During the time of Eyo Nsa, the people of Creek town were regarded as "the best and most indefatigable traders". Eyo II was equally an honest man and was particularly known for his approach towards conflict resolution and peaceful negotiations. Eyo's methods towards conflict resolution can be seen in various accounts of his interactions with several foreigners who traded with him.

=== Trade with Supercargoes ===
Foreign traders from Europe who traded at the lower Cross River were termed the "Supercargoes". These traders came from different nations such as France, the Netherlands, Portugal and England. Eyo had experience in the trade and with foreign traders since his youth. Eyo's attitude varied towards different European nationals. With the English, Eyo was more trusting and once revealed that the Efik and the English had been friends long before the time of his father and grandfather. The system of trade practiced during the triangular trade era was known as the "trust system". This system involved the offering of goods by European traders to African merchants of good reputation who would then use the goods to purchase a specified quota of slaves or other items. Items exported by the Efik traders would include ivory, redwood, palm oil etc. Sometimes the Efik merchants did not make payments for the goods they received on trust which would be a termed a breach of trust. On occasions where Efik merchants had breached trust, it was not uncommon for European merchants to harass the Efik traders and visit them in their homes. On one occasion, King Eyo had chartered a whole ship known as "The Olinda" with the intention of shipping oil directly to Britain. On learning of Eyo's plans, Consul Hutchinson summoned King Eyo reminding him that he owed trust of 400 tons of oil, an equivalent of £18,000 and could not allow him to ship oil directly to Britain unless he had settled his debts.

=== Relations with the French ===
The French had traded in the Bight of Biafra region for a long time. French presence in the lower Cross River region grew around the middle of the 19th century. According to Nair, in 1830, John Beecroft complained that British merchants were hopelessly outnumbered by the French slave trading vessels. The increasing presence of the French whom the Efik traders did not trust was one of the reasons the Efik chiefs persistently requested that the British establish a stronger presence in the region. Although several European nations had signed the anti-slave treaties, the French were not part of the agreement. In 1843, the French gun boat La Vigie had threatened to blow up Old Calabar if the Efik did not supply them with slaves. The Efik rulers vehemently refused because they had signed the anti-slavery treaties with the British in 1841. In 1847, two French war steamers arrived Old Calabar and paid a visit to King Eyo. When they arrived Old Calabar, they sent word to Eyo informing him that they would be paying him a visit with the aim of signing a treaty with him for the suppression of human sacrifices. The French were already aware that the British had a long history of inter-relations with the Efik and already had an established presence in Old Calabar. The intention of the French was to place Old Calabar under French imperialism. Prior to the arrival of the French in King Eyo's home, Eyo had hoisted a British flag over his home. Eyo skillfully tackled the French and made them know that Calabar was for the English. According to Aye,

King Eyo did not trust the French whose commodore wanted to use him for his imperial design: they wanted him to visit their ships under French colours and would also have to hoist the French ensign at his house because they could not salute him under English colours. And had King Eyo yielded to the French pressure as they demanded, it would have reflected unfavourably on the English-French relationship.

=== Relations with the Sierra Leoneans ===
Another group of foreigners that settled in Old Calabar during the reign of Eyo II were the Sierra Leoneans. The Sierra Leoneans arrived Old Calabar as traders in the early 1850s together with some independent European traders that arrived separately. These Sierra Leoneans were mainly ex-slaves from America who had returned to Sierra Leone as free men and later emigrated to several parts of West Africa such as Abeokuta, Lagos and Accra. While some towns such as Bonny were hostile to the idea of foreigners settling in their communities, Eyo II welcomed them saying, "Let them come, I will be glad to see them and give them land. I will look on them as white men because they have learnt white men fashion. Let them come and teach my people. Nobody will trouble them". With the assistance of the Church of Scotland Mission, several Sierra Leoneans emigrated to Old Calabar. The Sierra Leonean traders sought to break the monopoly held by the Liverpool traders together with other foreign vessels. They believed in economic liberalism and free trade. For a short period, the Sierra Leoneans worked together with Efik traders to break the monopoly of the Liverpool traders by carrying out trade agreements outside existing agreements. For instance, King Eyo II was secretly selling oil to a Sierra Leonean trader known as Peter Nicoll. This transaction came to the notice of other European traders, who were enraged. In November 1855, sixteen puncheons of Oil owned by Peter Nicoll were confiscated by Captain Cuthbertson. According to Nair,

The explanation given by Cuthbertson was that he could not recover an outstanding debt owed him by Creek Town if Nicoll was not held hostage. Nicoll disavowed any association he had with Creek Town's debt, stated that he was a 'British subject' and had the same rights to trade in any part of the world as any British supercargo. In appealing for redress from the acting consul, Lynslager, Nicoll pointed out that the seizure represented a breach of all the laws of commercial honour and honesty and a violation of his privileges as a British subject. Cuthbertson and the other supercargoes, who were ruthlessly determined to deal firmly with the new competitors, claimed that they had been 'perfectly unable' to obtain their trust from the Efik. They argued that in disposing of his oil to others through Nicoll, Eyo had not only delayed the supply of oil to European vessels but had also shipped it in casks lent by supercargoes to the Efik for their own oil.

The acting consul Lynslager was more sympathetic towards the supercargoes and believed the people of Creek Town were insolent, believing themselves to be safe from any hostile actions due to their town being high up the river. Lynslager visited Creek Town in H.M.S Minx, a Man-of-War possibly with the intention of intimidating the people. He assembled all the chiefs of Creek Town, accusing them of abusing the trust system and demanding an explanation. Eyo stated that he had supplied Nicoll with oil because Nicoll had equally supplied him with guns, clothes, brass rods, iron bars as well as comey. Lynslager reiterated the arguments made by the supercargoes that the vessels awaiting trust had first claim to goods and were incurring heavy expenses by their prolonged stay. Lynslager further stated that Eyo had no right to ship oil directly to England until his trust had been liquidated. Due to the tensions that had risen and the acting consul's reaction towards Eyo's actions, Eyo chose to sign a document legalizing the withholding of one of his countrymen for another Creek Town man who was indebted.

== Missionary involvement ==
With the abolishment of the slave trade in 1807, the economic climate of Old Calabar was threatened. The kings and chiefs of Old Calabar informed by the global events, wrote several letters to the British requesting for teachers and missionaries to visit Old Calabar to teach commerce and religion to the people. In 1846, the first missionaries of the Church of Scotland mission arrived. The missionaries were settled in properly at Duke Town and Creek Town. King Eyo, who realised the need for reforms, aided the missionaries in abolishing several practices which he regarded as barbaric. Upon their arrival Eyo was cited saying, "Now I am sure God will love and bless me, for I am very glad you come with this book." Eyo's respect for the missionaries ultimately resulted in law changes over his domain. Such reforms included the elimination of human sacrifice, the allowance of widows and twins to return to Creek Town, the elimination of "Ekpenyong" - the household idol of the region, and the ending of Sunday markets. In addition to altering laws, Eyo also translated the church services put on by the missionaries, mainly Rev. Waddell. Eyo maintained his agency by collaborating with the Europeans who encountered his kingdom and left a reputation that is best stated in Religion in Calabar by Rosalind I.J. Hackett, "The Efik, epitomized by King Eyo Honesty, showed the capacity to adapt internally, to 'modernize' without becoming 'westernized' or 'Christianized'".

== Later years and Death ==
By the last decade of King Eyo's reign, British involvement in several aspects of Efik socio-cultural life was evident. Although King Eyo was happy with some of the changes that had taken place within old Calabar during the stay of the British missionaries, he protested their interference in matters of the state. King Eyo died on 3 December 1858. Although he is termed as a "Christian King", King Eyo never converted to Christianity and adhered to customs which he believed were unharmful to Christian doctrine.

== Legacy ==
King Eyo is particularly known for his efforts in abolishing practices such as the killing of twins; human sacrifices; and the immolation of slaves upon the death of a dignitary. He is also credited as having invited the missionaries to Old Calabar who were responsible for several religious reforms in Old Calabar society. Within the Ekpe society of Old Calabar, King Eyo is regarded as the founder of the brass grade.

== See also ==
- Hugh Crow

== Bibliography ==
- Oku, Ekei Essien (1989), The Kings & Chiefs of Old Calabar (1785-1925), Calabar: Glad Tidings Press Ltd., ISBN 978-30541-0-4.
- Kingsley, Mary (1899), West African Studies, London: Macmillan & Co. Ltd. OCLC 2652672
- Crow, Hugh (1830), Memoirs of the late Captain Hugh Crow of Liverpool, London; Liverpool: Longman, Rees, Orme, Brown and Green: And G. and J. Robinson OCLC 1048815431
- Hackett, Rosalind I. J. (1989), Religion in Calabar: The religious life and history of a Nigerian town, Berlin: Mouton de Gruyter OCLC 470747014
- Hart, A. Kalada (1964), Report of the Enquiry into the Dispute Over the Obongship of Calabar, Enugu: The Government Printer OCLC 32857131
- Bold, Edward (1823) [1819], Merchant's and Mariner's African Guide: containing an accurate description of the coast, bays, harbours and adjacent islands of West Africa, Salem: Cushing & Appleton OCLC 28711857
- Waddell, Hope Masterton (1863), Twenty-Nine Years in the West Indies and Central Africa, London: Nelson & Sons OCLC 862147545.
- Nair, Kannan K. (1977). "King and Missionary in Efik politics, 1846-1858". Journal of African Studies. 4 (3): 243–280. OCLC 70803266
- Marwick, William (1897), William and Louis Anderson: A Record of their Life and Work in Jamaica and Old Calabar, Edinburgh: Andrew Elliot, 17 Princes street
- Goldie, Hugh (1894), Memoirs of King Eyo Honesty VII of Old Calabar, Old Calabar: United Presbyterian Mission Press
- Aye, Efiong U. (2009), King Eyo Honesty II, Calabar, ISBN 978-978-8073-44-4
- Hutchinson, Thomas J. (1858), Impressions of West Africa, London: Longman, Brown, Green, Longmans & Roberts OCLC 1046641528
- Nair, Kannan K. (1972), Politics and Society in South Eastern Nigeria, 1841–1906: A Study of Power, Diplomacy and Commerce in Old Calabar, London: Frank Cass, ISBN 0-7146-2296-6
- Aye, Efiong U. (1967), Old Calabar through the centuries, Calabar: Hope Waddell Press OCLC 476222042
- Latham, A.J.H. (1973), Old Calabar (1600-1891): The Impact of the International Economy upon a Traditional Society, Oxford: Clarendon Press
- Imbua, David Lishilinimle (2013). "Robbing Others to Pay Mary Slessor: Unearthing the Authentic Heroes and Heroines of the Abolition of Twin-Killing in Calabar". African Economic History. 41: 139–158.
- Church Missionary Society (1853). "Fernando Po and the Adjacent Region". The Church Missionary Intelligencer. IV. London.
- Duke, Orok Orok Effiom (2008), Great Calabar Chronicle: People, World Events and Dates, 1500-2007, Calabar: Clinprint International, ISBN 978-978-016-624-3
- Talbot, Percy Amaury (1969) [1st pub. 1926], The People of Southern Nigeria: a sketch of their history, ethnology and languages, with an abstract of the 1921 census, vol. 1, London: Frank Cass & Co. Ltd. OCLC 716063900
- Simmons, Donald C. (1968) [1st pub. 1956], "An Ethnographic Sketch of the Efik people", in Forde, Daryll (ed.), Efik Traders of Old Calabar, London: Dawsons of Pall Mall OCLC 67514086
- Dike, Kenneth O. (1962) [1st pub. 1956], Trade and Politics in the Niger Delta 1830 - 1885, Oxford: Clarendon Press OCLC 1203412128
