= Eyamba V =

Obong of Old Calabar

Obong of Calabar
- Reign: 1834-1847
- Predecessor: Efiom Edem Efiom Okoho
- Successor: Archibong I

Iyamba V
- Predecessor: Efiom Edem (Great Duke Ephraim)
- Successor: Ntiero Ekpenyong
- Wife: Nkwa Oboko
- Issue: Efiom Edem, Iyamba VII; James Eyamba V, Iyamba X; Efiom J. Eyamba, Iyamba XI
Names
- Edem Ekpenyong Offiong Okoho
- House: Eyamba House
- Father: Ekpenyong Offiong Okoho
- Mother: Edim Ekpenyong

Eyamba V (Edem Ekpenyong Offiong Okoho Efiom Ekpo Efiom Ekpo, popularly known to Europeans by the trade name Johnny Young and referred to by the Efik people as Iyamba V) (Note: The word "Iyamba" is used in reference to the Ekpe title while the word "Eyamba" is used as a personal name. Eyamba V is said to have been the first person to use the title of "Iyamba" as a personal name) was the Obong of Old Calabar and the fifth Iyamba of Ekpe Efik Iboku. His father was Ekpenyong Offiong Okoho also known as Eyamba III. His mother was Edim Ekpenyong Ekpe Oku, a daughter of Ekpenyong Ekpe Oku also known as Eyamba II.

== Succession as Iyamba V ==
Paternally and maternally, Edem Ekpenyong as he was known at birth, came from a line of Iyamba title holders. His father was Iyamba III. He was a grandson of Iyamba II and a grand-nephew to Essien Ekpe Oku who was Iyamba I. The fourth Iyamba came from the Duke Ephraim line. To consolidate their power, some Mbọñ of Calabar would obtain the Iyamba title to acquire traditional and political authority. (Note: Mbong translates to "Kings" or "Chiefs" in the Efik language. Its singular form would be Obong) The acquisition of this title would enhance the authority of the elected Obong and would expedite their role as rulers. Although Edem Ekpenyong was maternally and paternally from a family of Iyamba title-holders, he still spent a lot of money in securing the eternal ownership of the Iyamba title for his family. This action was similar to the actions of his great uncle Esien Ekpe (Iyamba I) who purchased the five lower Ekpe grades for his children and those yet unborn. Edem Ekpenyong obtained the title of Eyamba by paying an entire town for it. As a result, the Eyamba house was allowed to retain the title perpetually. Thereafter, Edem Ekpenyong chose to bear the name "Eyamba V". According to Hope Waddell, Eyamba's power was consolidated after the acquisition of the Iyamba title.

== Selection for Kingship ==
Although not much is known regarding the details of his selection as the Obong of Old Calabar, Hope Waddell regarded Eyamba as 'a usurper... and by bribery and flattery gained the support of other chiefs and carried the election.' Although Hope Waddell was not present at the time of Edem Ekpenyong's election, He may have obtained the information regarding Eyamba's ascension to the throne from Eyamba's detractors, some of whom he was unpopular with due to trade disagreements and those of whom lost the struggle for kingship with him. Nair postulates that Eyamba may have been regarded as a usurper due to his elimination of people whom he regarded as potential threats to the longevity of his rule.

== Reign ==
=== Eyamba V and the Missionaries ===
The abolition of the slave trade led to destabilization of commerce among the trading Chiefs and the supercargoes. Attempts were made to abandon the old practice of the slave trade and transition to other commercial ventures. Eyamba who was worried about the repercussions of the abolishment of the slave trade expressed his aspirations for Old Calabar to Commander Raymond. In a letter dated December 4, 1842, Eyamba stated:

'Now we settle treaty for not sell slave, I must tell you something, I want your, Queen to do for we. Now we can't sell slaves again we must have too much man for country, and want something for make work and trade, and if we could get seed for cotton and coffee we could make trade. Plenty sugar cane live here and if some man must come for teach book proper, and make all men saby God like white man, and then we go on for same fashion. We thank you too much for what thing you come do for keep thing right. Long time we no look Man-of-War as Blount promise and one Frenchman come make plenty palaver for slave when we can't get them. You been do very proper for we, and now we want to keep proper mouth. I hope some Man-of-War come sometime with proper captain all same you look out and and help we keep word when French Man-of-War come. What I want for dollar side is a fine coat and sword all same I tell you and the rest in copper rods. I hope Queen Victoria and young prince will live long time and we get good friend. Also I want bomb and shell.

The request for artillery showed Eyamba to be a military leader but the appeal for technocrats to aid in the establishment of Coffee and Sugar industries was ignored as the triangular trade was still being carried out discreetly. Oku postulates that the establishment of coffee and sugar industries would have seriously affected the imports from Liverpool as not much sugar or coffee would have been required from there. Prior to the arrival of the missionaries at Calabar, Presbyterian missionaries evangelized to the former slaves in the West Indies. Newly Converted Christians in Jamaica were desirous of propagating the Christian gospel to Africa. Their desire was made known to the Scottish mission who deliberated on the matter. British traders gave accounts of the Calabar people's desire for Education and formal proposals were sent to King Eyamba V and the chiefs of Duke Town. Prior to the middle of 1843, negotiations were nearly completed and after a meeting with Eyamba and other chiefs, it was decided that land would be offered to the missionaries between Duke Town and Henshaw Town. An undertaking was made by King Eyamba V and other Chiefs to show their commitment towards missionary establishment in Old Calabar. The missionaries finally left for Calabar in 1846. There were six missionaries in the pioneering team which included Rev. Hope M. Waddell (Leader), Mr & Mrs Samuel Edgerly (Catechist & Printer), Mr Andrew Chisholm, Mr Edward Miller (Teacher), George (An Ex-Slave Boy). At the time of the arrival of the missionaries, King Eyamba V was already an old Man. When they arrived, they first met King Eyo Honesty who was delivering oil to one of his ships. They met King Eyamba V the following day who remarked "I look long time for you. Glad you come now for live here. Look about and choose what place you like for make house. The whole country belongs to me for six days journey all round." Being a highly competitive king, Eyamba V was displeased when he learnt that two mission houses were to be established in Calabar, one at Creek Town and one in Duke Town. He saw no reason why there should be two mission houses and appealed to Beecroft who responded saying,

"You call it strange thing and what of that. We see new things every day. And nothing can be more new and strange than to see white lady live in any of your towns and teach your children. Never fear, no harm will come..."

Eyamba V guaranteed the missionaries of his protection and promised to forgive slaves whom the missionaries would intercede for and promised not to harm such slaves unless they commit serious crimes "as in England". Eyamba's reference to England reveals that he was knowledgeable in international affairs and is further confirmed during Captain Beecroft's visit to Calabar where he informs Becroft that he is aware of the developments taking place in the triangular trade.

=== Eyamba V and the Supercargoes ===
Eyamba did not have a great reputation among foreign merchants. He was known to break trade agreements which was common among some trading chiefs of his time. Hope Waddell described an incident where a Captain of the ship "May" detained Eyamba V when he invited him for breakfast on board the ship. The reason for his detainment was that he was owing the ship "thirty-five puncheons" or about twenty-five tons of Palm Oil and was exceedingly late for a payment. Although Eyamba V saw the need to work with foreign traders like his ancestors had done, he was wary of their excessive exploits. His concerns were revealed when he was apprehensive of a British vessel exploring up the Cross River in 1841.

=== Eyamba V and the Iron Palace ===
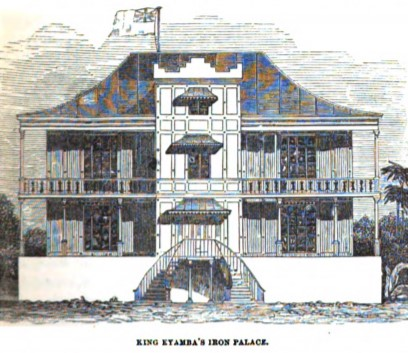
Edem Ekpenyong's Iron Palace

One of the most notable Architectural feats of Southern Nigeria in the 19th century, Eyamba's iron palace was a two stories building framed of wood and roofed with galvanized iron plates. At the time the Iron palace was built, Iron houses were not in vogue across Europe. The Iron Palace was built by William Laycock on the request of Eyamba V. Regarding the History of the building, it was stated that,

"Sometime ago, a handsome house of wood was sent out from this port, for the use of a rival prince on the same coast, which, when erected, became, like the British constitution, the envy of surrounding nations, and the admiration of the (African) world. On this, King Eyambo determined to be vulli secuudus in the accommodation of his royal self and his three hundred and twenty wives (for his majesty equals King Solomon himself, both in his zeal for building and in his love of the fair sex), and resolved to have a palace built, superior not only to the wooden house, hut to any thing overseen on the coast of Africa.

The Iron Palace was demolished during the reign of King Archibong II who claimed that he had a dream where he saw Eyamba V in the "ghostland" without a shelter and that he requested that his palace be sent to him there.

=== Eyamba V and Queen Victoria ===
Eyamba carried out an extended correspondence with Queen Victoria. During it, the Queen tried to convince Eyamba to end the slave trade amongst the Efiks and offered her protection in exchange. In response, Eyamba suggested that since he could only accept the protection of a woman if they were married to each other, he could marry her as a prelude to the abolition.

Although Victoria is said to have tactfully ignored the marriage offer, a misunderstanding led to the gifts that she sent with her next letter being interpreted in Calabar as an acceptance of it. This in turn caused the myth to grow up amongst the Efiks that Queen Victoria was the wife of King Eyamba V, a myth that is maintained in their oral traditions today.

During the subsequent reign of her descendant and successor Queen Elizabeth II, the myth was used as a reason to honour her cousin Prince Michael of Kent with a title in the Nigerian chieftaincy system by the reigning Obong of Calabar, Edidem Ekpo Okon Abasi Otu V.

Barbara Etim James, an obong-awan of the Efiks who hosted Prince Michael during his installation, was quoted as saying:

During Prince Michael's visit, at every opportunity, they (the Efiks) reminded him that he was their in-law. Even at the ceremony, they told that story again. Prince Michael was delighted to hear (of) the historical ties between the Efik and British royalty and was honoured to be deepening those ties with his Efik chieftaincy.

== Death ==
On the death of Eyamba in 1847, the pandemonium that broke through Old Calabar was great. It was the custom of the Efik people to bury members of the royal family with slaves. In cases where the person who died was male, he would be buried with some of his wives and slaves. Rev Hope Waddell gives the details of Eyamba's death stating,

For the King's interment, a great pit was dug, wide and deep inside a house and at one side of it, a chamber was excavated, in which were placed two sofas, On these the body was laid dressed in its ornaments, and a crown on its head. Then his umbrella, sword, snuff box bearers, and other personal attendants were suddenly killed, and thrown in with the insignia of their offices; and living virgins also, it was said, according to old custom. Great quantities of food and trade goods, and coppers were added; after which the pit was filled, and the ground trampled and beaten that no trace of the grave might remain. Lest they should be violated whether through revenge or cupidity, such precautions are always used to conceal the graves of the nobles.

Thirty of Eyamba's wives were killed the first day. For some, it was an honour to be "Called" to join the king in the afterlife. Several pleas were made by the missionaries but all with little effect. Some of the executioners misled them with false promises while some Chiefs rebuked the missionaries saying that "...white people had no right to interfere with black men's fashions. The School at Duke Town was shut for several weeks and Chiefs refused to send their children to school to keep them from harm.

== Ancestry ==
Ancestors of Eyamba V

4. Offiong Okoho
8. Efiom Ekpo
6. Okoho Efiom
2. Ekpenyong Offiong
1. Eyamba V Edem Ekpenyong
9. Oku Atai
7. Ekpe Oku
5. Ekpenyong Ekpe
3. Edim Ekpenyong

== Bibliography ==
- Oku, Ekei Essien (1989), The Kings & Chiefs of Old Calabar (1785-1925), Calabar: Glad Tidings Press Ltd., ISBN 978-30541-0-4.
- Hart, A. Kalada (1964), Report of the Enquiry into the Dispute Over the Obongship of Calabar, Enugu: The Government Printer OCLC 32857131.
- Waddell, Hope Masterton (1863), Twenty-Nine Years in the West Indies and Central Africa, London: Nelson & Sons OCLC 862147545.
- Duke, Orok Orok Effiom (2008), Great Calabar Chronicle: People, World Events and Dates, 1500-2007, Calabar: Clinprint International, ISBN 978-978-016-624-3.
- Nair, Kannan K. (1972), Politics and Society in South Eastern Nigeria, 1841–1906: A Study of Power, Diplomacy and Commerce in Old Calabar, London: Frank Cass, ISBN 0-7146-2296-6.
- Aye, Efiong U. (1967), Old Calabar through the centuries, Calabar: Hope Waddell Press OCLC 476222042.
- Latham, A.J.H. (1973), Old Calabar (1600-1891): The Impact of the International Economy upon a Traditional Society, Oxford: Clarendon Press.
- "Iron Houses. Rebuilding of Pointe-a-pitre". The Builder. 1. 1842.
- Captain Becroft and J.B. King (1844). "Details of Explorations of the Old Calabar River, in 1841 and 1842". The Journal of the Royal Geographical Society. 14: 260–283. ISSN 0266-6235.
