= Duke Town =

Town in Cross River, Nigeria

Duke Town Atakpa
- City state
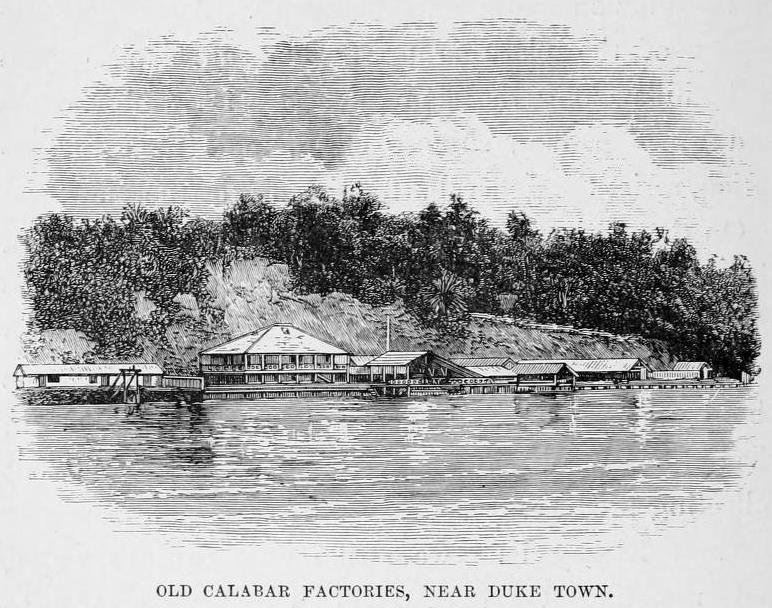
- Picture of Old Calabar Factories from HM Stanley's book "The Congo and the founding of its free state; a story of work and exploration (1885)"

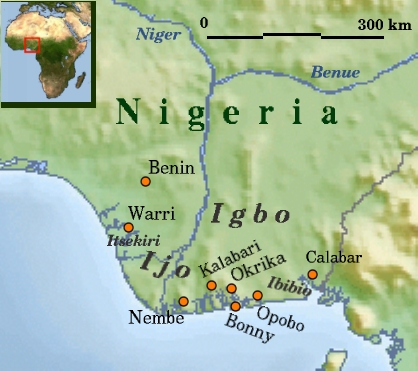
- Southern states, including Calabar
- Coordinates: 4°57′N 8°19′E

Duke Town, originally known as Atakpa, is an Efik city-state that flourished in the 19th century in what is now southern Nigeria. The City State extended from Calabar to Bakassi in the east and Biase to Oron in the west. Although it is now absorbed into Nigeria, traditional rulers of the state are still recognized. The state occupied what is now the modern city of Calabar.

== Origins and society ==
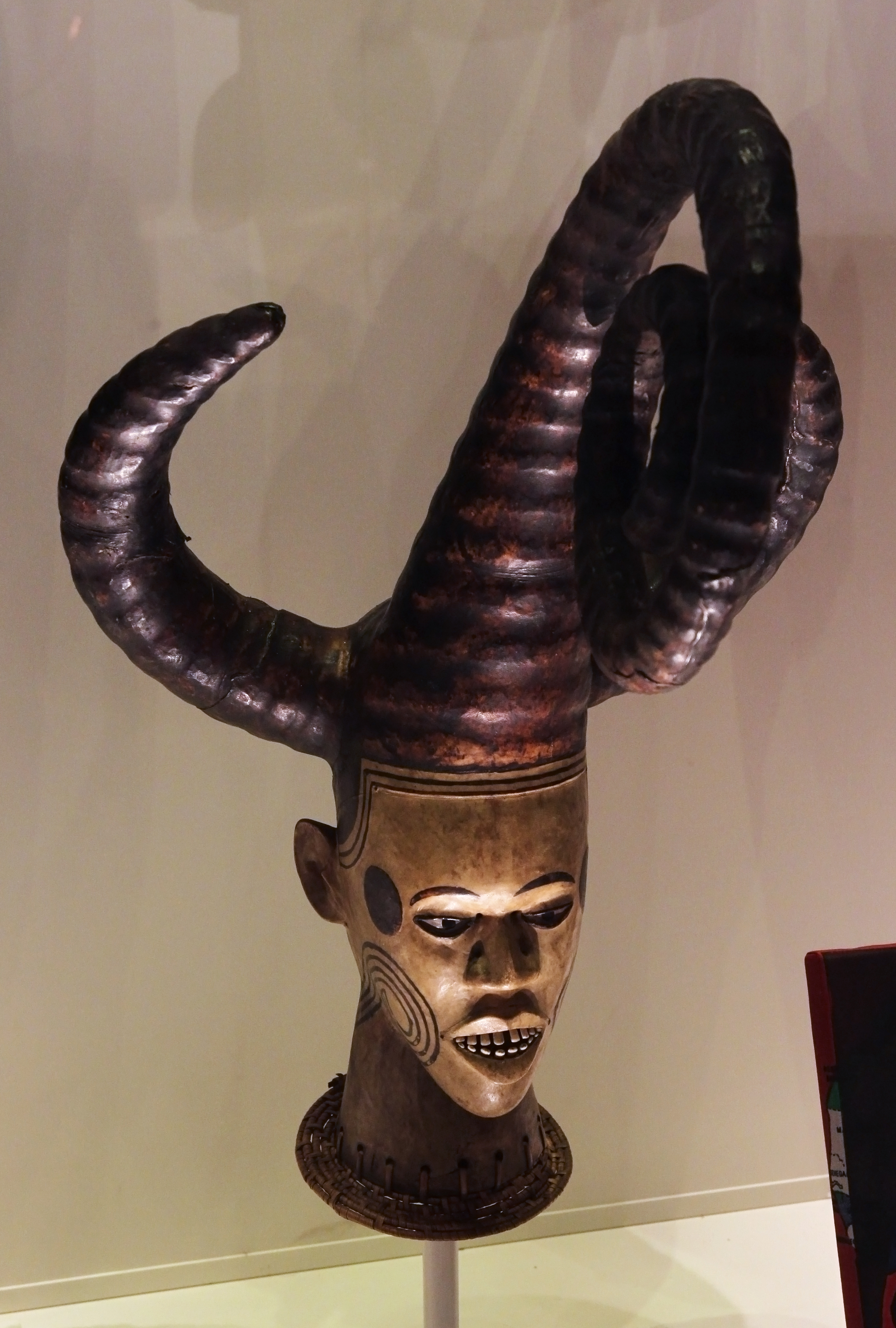
Skin covered head dress from the related Ekoi people.

The Efik speak a language that is a subgroup of the Niger–Congo language group. They had become a power on the coast of the Bight of Biafra by the early 18th century, by which time the Duke and Eyamba families were their leaders. They were settled in large, fortified villages along the waterways, in a loose federation with no paramount ruler, living by fishing and farming. The largest settlements were Ikot Itunko, Obutong and Iboku Atapka. In the 19th century, the British renamed these as Creek Town, Old Town and Duke Town.

== Religion ==
The traditional Efik religion considers that Abasi created the universe. One tradition says that Abasi's wife Atai persuaded him to let two of their children, a daughter and son, settle on the earth. They were not allowed to breed, but disobeyed this injunction and became the ancestors of the Efik people. Another version says that Abasi created two people, and did not allow them to breed. When they disobeyed this order, in punishment, Abasi let loose death on the earth.

The religion places importance on paying tribute to the village ancestors, particularly those who achieved high rank, since they can affect the fortunes of the living for good or bad. The earth deity Ala is appeased through the Ogbom ceremony, which makes children plentiful and increases the harvest.

Some Efik belong to the Ekpe secret society. They made detailed wood carvings, masks, and accouterments that are considered complex works of art. Efik sacred ceremonies include drumming and music as important elements.

== Slave trade ==
The coast in this region was named "Calabar" by the Portuguese explorer Diogo Cao. His reason for choosing this name is unknown, since it was not used by the Efik people. The city of Akwa Akpa was founded by Efik families who had left Creek Town, further up the Calabar river, settling on the east bank in a position where they were able to dominate the slave trade with European vessels that anchored in the river. They soon became the most powerful people in the region. Dukes Town is believed to have been founded in about 1650 according to historians Ekei Essien Oku and Efiong U. Aye. Akwa Akpa, also known as Duke Town to the British, became a center of the Atlantic slave trade, where slaves were exchanged for European goods.

Igbo people formed the majority of enslaved Africans which were sold as slaves from Calabar, despite forming a minority among the ethnic groups in the region. From 1725 until 1750, roughly 17,000 enslaved Africans were sold from Calabar to European slave traders; from 1772 to 1775, the number soared to over 62,000. In 1767, six British slave ships arrived in Calabar during a period when Duke Town and Old Town were in the midst of a feud. The leaders of Duke Town made a secret arrangement with the slave traders whereby the leaders of Old Town would be invited onboard their ships to settle the dispute; guarantees of their safety were made. When the leaders of Old Town came aboard the ships, they were seized, with some being kept as slaves while others were handed over to the leaders of Duke Town, who ordered their execution.

== Later history ==
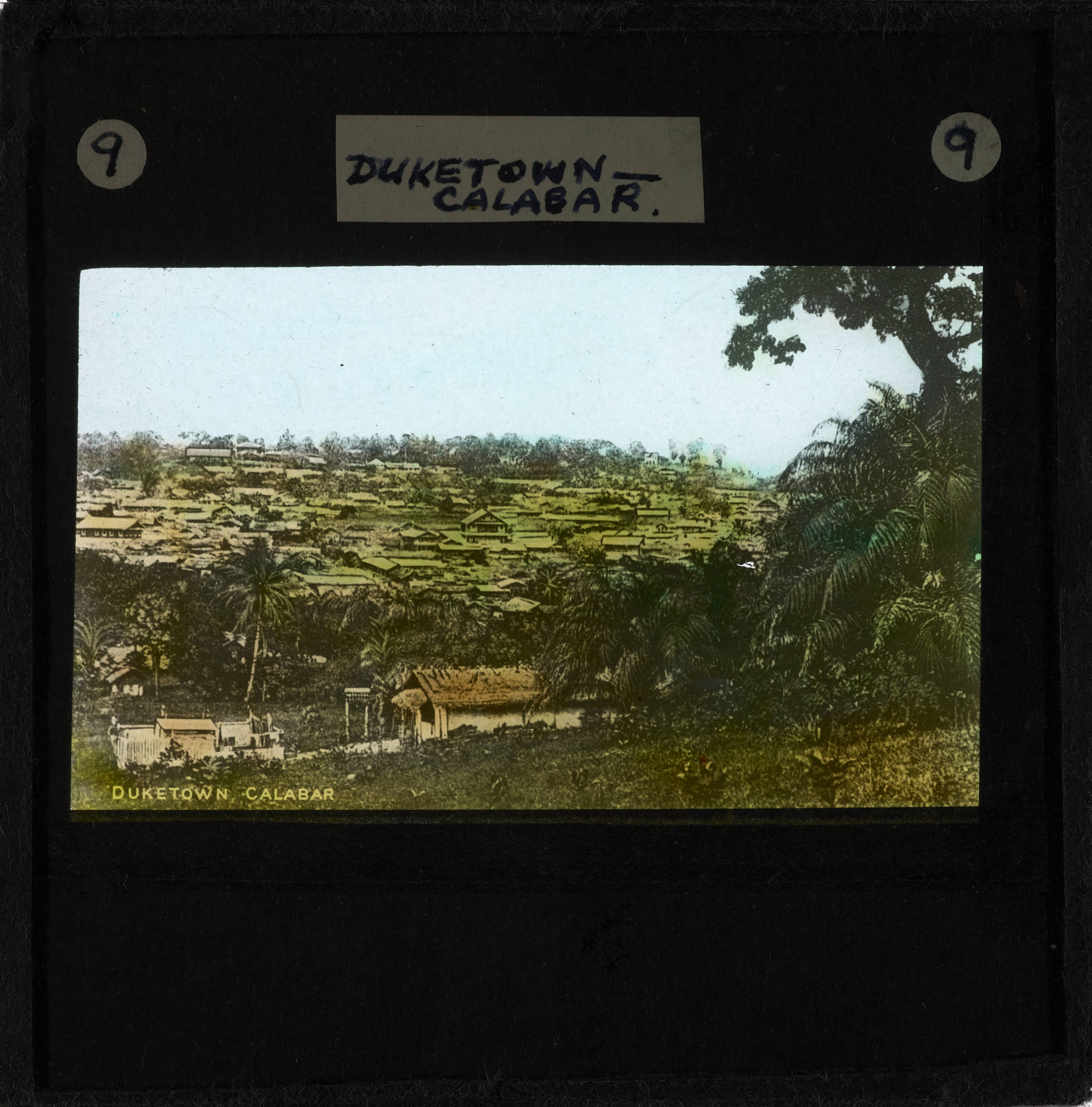
"Duketown Calabar", late 19th century

The British outlawed their involvement in the slave trade in 1807, though slave traders from other European nations, such as Spain, continued to buy slaves at Calabar until 1841. In that year, King Eyamba V of Duke Town and King Eyo of Creek Town signed a treaty agreeing to stop their involvement in the slave trade. With the suppression of the slave trade, palm oil and palm kernels became the main exports.

In 1846 a Christian mission was established by the United Presbyterian Church between Duke Town and Henshaw town, with the support of King Eyo. The mission was headed by Rev. Hope Masterton Waddell with support from Hugh Goldie, who wrote an account of Calabar in his 1890 book Calabar and its Mission. That year the chiefs requested British protection for Calabar, but the reply from Lord Palmerston, received in 1848, was that it was not necessary or advisable to grant the request. The British said they would treat the people of Calabar favorably if they would give up their practice of human sacrifice. At the time, it was common for wives and slaves of an important man to be sacrificed upon his death.

On the death of King Eyamba in 1847, it was proposed that King Eyo become sole ruler, which the British favored. However, Duke Town's leaders did not agree, and selected Archibong Duke as the new king. In 1850, both kings agreed to suppress human sacrifice.

British influence continued to grow, as did acceptance of Christianity. The chiefs of Akwa Akpa placed themselves under British protection in 1884. King Archibong III of Calabar Kingdom was crowned in 1878 with a regalia sent directly by Queen Victoria of the United Kingdom.

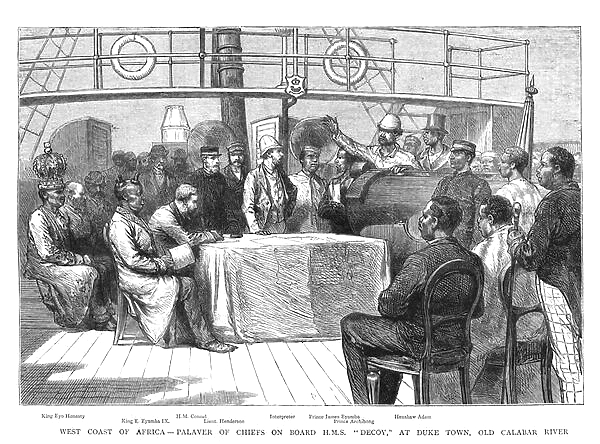
Palaver of Chiefs on board HMS Decoy, at Duke Town, Old Calabar River - The Graphic 1880

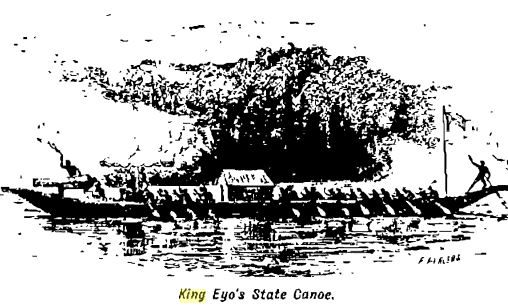
Illustration from Calabar and Its Mission (1890) by Hugh Goldie

From 1884 until 1906 Old Calabar was the headquarters of the Niger Coast Protectorate, after which Lagos became the main center. Now called Calabar, the city remained an important port shipping ivory, timber, beeswax, and palm produce until 1916, when the railway terminus was opened at Port Harcourt, 145 km to the west.

== Independent rulers ==
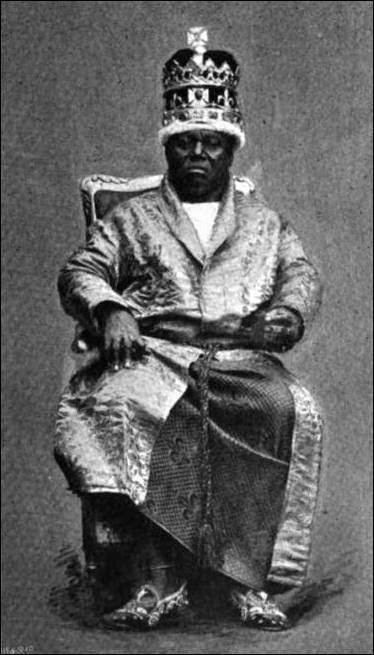
King Duke IX of Calabar in Full Dress (published 1895).

Rulers of the city state, and successors in the traditional state, were:

- Ekpenyong Offiong Okoho (1786–1805)
- Ekpenyong Effiom Okoho Eyamba III (1805–1814)
- Effiom Edem Ekpo Effiom I Eyamba IV (1814–1834)
- Edem Ekpenyong Offiong Okoho Eyamba V (1834–1847)
- Efio-Okoho Asibong Ekpo (May 1849 - February 1852)
- Ededem Effiom II (April 1852 - August 1858)
- Eyo Asibong II (March 1859 - August 1872)
- Edem Asibong III Eyamba VIII (1872 - May 1879)
- Orok Edem-Odo Eyamba IX (1880–1896)

== Later Obongs ==
In 1903 the British made an agreement with the Efik Kings that they would no longer use title of King (Edidem), but instead as titular rulers would have the title Obong of Calabar.

- Obong Edem Effiom Edem (January 1901 - July 1906)
- Obong Adam Ephraim Duke X
- Obong Asibong IV
- Obong Asibong V (1956 -)

== Efik rulers ==
In December 1970 it was agreed that a single ruler should represent the Efik people, rather than two (one for Creek Town and one for Duke Town), with the ruler alternated between the two communities.

- Edidem David James Henshaw V (1970–1973)
- Edidem Esien Ekpe Oku V (1973–1980)
- Edidem Bassey Eyo Ephraim Adam III (1982–1986)
- Edidem Otu Ekpenyong Effa IX (1987–1989)
- Edidem Boco Ene Mkpang Cobham V (1989–1999)
- (vacant 1999 - 2001)
- Edidem Nta Elijah Henshaw (2001–2004)
- Edidem Ekpo Okon Abasi Otu (2008 - till date)

== See also ==
- Efik people
- Efik mythology
- Ekpe
- Timeline of Old Calabar history
- Eniong Abatim

== Bibliography ==
- Aye, Efiong U. (1967), Old Calabar through the centuries, Calabar: Hope Waddell Press OCLC 476222042
- Latham, A.J.H. (1973), Old Calabar (1600-1891): The Impact of the International Economy upon a Traditional Society, Oxford: Clarendon Press
- Simmons, Donald C. (1968) [1st pub. 1956], "An Ethnographic Sketch of the Efik people", in Forde, Daryll (ed.), Efik Traders of Old Calabar, London: Dawsons of Pall Mall OCLC 67514086
- Sparks, Randy J. (2004), The Two Princes of Calabar: An Eighteenth-century Atlantic Odyssey, Harvard University Press, ISBN 0-674-01312-3
- Goldie, Hugh (1890), Calabar and its Mission, Edinburgh: Oliphant, Anderson & Ferrier
