= Hope Masterton Waddell =

Irish pharmatocs missionary

Reverend Hope Masterton Waddell
- Born: 14 November 1804; Monaghan, Ireland
- Died: 18 April 1895 (aged 90); Dublin, Ireland
- Occupation: Church of Scotland medical missionary
- Known for: missionary in Jamaica and Nigeria
- Spouse: Jessie Simpson

Reverend Hope Masterton Waddell (14 November 1804 – 18 April 1895) was an Irish medical missionary in Jamaica and Calabar, Nigeria. The Hope Waddell Training Institution is named after him.

== Early life and training ==
Waddell was born in Monaghan, Ireland on 14 November 1804 to Susan Hope and the son of Alexander Waddell both members of the Presbyterian Church of Ireland. He expressed an early interest in joining the ministry however was discouraged in doing so due to a speech impediment. At the age of 17 he apprenticed with a druggist before leaving, in 1822, to study for the church. He was accepted as a candidate for the missionary in 1825 by the Scottish Missionary Society and in 1827 entered the United Secession Hall.

== Missionary work in Jamaica ==
Following Waddell's ordainment in 1829, he married Jessie Simpson and together they embarked on a mission to Jamaica with the Church of Scotland Mission. Here he worked with the enslaved population of Cornwall until 1831, when the Baptist War slave revolt broke out. Many blamed the revolt on the Christian and Baptist missions due to giving the slaves ideas about equality and freedom. Waddell gives an account of this in Twenty-nine years in the West Indies and Central Africa: a review of missionery work and adventure. 1829-1858. He remained in Jamaica until 1834, when owing to his wife's illness the couple left Jamaica.

== Missionary work in Nigeria ==
He subsequently gained Church of Scotland Mission approval for a mission in Nigeria in 1845, and he arrived in the village of Old Calabar in 1846 accompanied by former members of his congregation who wished to “carry the gospel to their native land". In 1847 he moved the mission to Creek Town and worked educating the local population, teaching them English and converting them to Christianity. He made attempts to stop the practice of infanticide in the area, building a settlement for twins and their mothers so as to isolate them from the rest of the population, and allowing them to live. In addition, he managed to procure various agreements to abolish human sacrifice in the surrounding area. He also worked to limit the spread of what was most likely yellow fever in the villages, through use of calomel. While in Nigeria he learned Efik and built a relationship with King Eyo Honesty II, the ruler of the area at the time.

Following a leave of absence in 1853, the relationship between Waddell and his colleagues at the mission began to become strained, a possible cause for his eventual retirement from the mission in 1858, officially due to illness.

== Death and legacy ==
Following his return from Nigeria, Waddell established a missionary congregation and eventually retired to his home in Dublin. Days before Waddell's death on April 18, 1895, a school was founded in Duke Town, Nigeria and named the Hope Waddell Institute (later known as the Hope Waddell Training Institution) in honour of his work. It continues to run to this day and has produced many Nigerian politicians.
