= Akan calendar =

Calendar used by the Akan people, a Kwa group of West Africa

Today (at UTC+00)
- Saturday, 14 November 2026
- Akan: Nwonamemene
Other calendars
Armenian	27 Trē 1476
Aztec	Tlacaxipehualiztli 3, 10 Cōzcacuāuhtli
Babylonian	3 Arakhsamna, 2337 SE
Balinese pawukon	Luang, Pepet, Beteng, Laba, Keliwon, Aryang, Saniscara of Landep, Brahma, Jangur, Raja
Bengali	29 Kartik, BS 1433
Chinese	Yang Water Dragon・Root Mansion; Fire Horse Year, Month 10, Day 6 (Lidong, 8 days until Xiaoxue)
Common Era	14 November 2026 CE
Coptic	5 Hathor, AM 1743
Egyptian	2 Pharmuthi, 2775 NE
Ethiopian	5 H̱edār, 2019 Amätä Məhrät
French Republican	Décade III, Tridi de Brumaire de l'Année 235 de la République
Gregorian	14 November, AD 2026
Hebrew	4 Kislev, AM 5787
Hindu	Pūrvāṣāḍha・Dhṛti; Solar: 28 Kārtika, 1948 SE; Lunisolar: Pañcamī, Śukla pakṣa of Kārtika, 2083 VE; Rāudra・5127 KY・1,872,893
Icelandic	Laugardagur, 22 Gormánuður 2026
Islamic	3 Jumada al-thani, AH 1448 (using tabular method)
ISO week date	2026-W46-6
Japanese	6 Kannazuki, Reiwa 8 (Rittō, 8 days until Shōsetsu)
Julian	1 November, AD 2026 (AM 7535)
Julian day	2461359
Korean	6 Dwaejidal, 4359 DE
Maya	13.0.14.1.16; 9 Ceh, 10 Cib
Roman	Kalendis Novembribus, MMDCCLXXIX AUC
Solar Hijri	23 Aban, SH 1405
Tibetan	5 smin drug, me pho rta 2153 or 1772 or 1000

The Akan people (a Kwa group of West Africa) appear to have used a traditional system of timekeeping based on a six-day week (known as nnanson "seven-days" via inclusive counting). The Gregorian seven-day week is known as nnawɔtwe (eight-days). The combination of these two systems resulted in periods of 40 days, known as adaduanan (meaning "forty days").

== Nnanson ==
The composition or construction of the Adaduanan cycle appears to be based on an older six-day week. The six-day week is referred to as Nnanson (literally seven-days) and reflects the lack of zero in the numbering systems; the last day and the first day are both included when counting the days of a week.

Day	Translation
Fo	guilty verdict (passing sentence); judgement day
Bemim	Not guilty verdict (passing sentence); judgement day
Nwuna	Sleep (death) day; funerals day; covered day
Nkyi	Behind (hate-taboo) day; destroyed day.
Kuro	Town (ie political) day; royal day
Kwa	For nothing ('just like that', free, unrestrained) day, servant day
Mono	Fresh (starting) day

== Nnawɔtwe ==
The seven-day week is referred to as Nnawɔtwe (literally eight days). Like Nnanson the last day and the first day are both included when counting the days of a week.

English	Day	Translation
Monday	Ɛdwoada	Quiet (peace) day; calm.
Tuesday	Ɛbenada	Birthday of ocean; heat, boiling, cooking.
Wednesday	Wukuada	Birthday of Spider (reverse or mortal version of God)
Thursday	Yawuada	Birthday of Earth (a woman); power.
Friday	Efiada	Fertility (in some Fante States, birthday of Earth).
Saturday	Memeneda	Birthday of Supreme or Sky God (a man); respected, ancient
Sunday	Kwasiada	Under Day (awiase= under the sun); universe, everything.

== Adaduanan ==
When the six-day week is counted side-by-side with the seven-day week it takes a total of 42 days to reach all combinations. The result of these combinations is shown below; the four dabɔne are in italics:

	Week 1	Week 2	Week 3	Week 4	Week 5	Week 6
Day 1	Fo-Dwo	Nwuna-Dwo	Nkyi-Dwo	Kuru-Dwo	Kwa-Dwo	Mono-Dwo
Day 2	Nwuna-Bena	Nkyi-Bena	Kuru-Bena	Kwa-Bena	Mono-Bena	Fo-Bena
Day 3	Nkyi-Wukuo	Kuru-Wukuo	Kwa-Wukuo	Mono-Wukuo	Fo-Wukuo	Nwuna-Wukuo
Day 4	Kuru-Ya	Kwa-Ya	Mono-Ya	Fo-Ya	Nwuna-Ya	Nkyi-Ya
Day 5	Kwa-Afi	Mono-Afi	Fo-Fi	Nwuna-Afi	Nkyi-Afi	Kuru-Afi
Day 6	Mono-Mene	Fo-Mene	Nwuna-Mene	Nkyi-Mene	Kuru-Mene	Kwa-Mene
Day 7	Fo-Kwasi	Nwuna-Kwasi	Nkyi-Kwasi	Kuru-Kwasi	Kwa-Kwasi	Mono-Kwasi

The 42-day cycle shown here, as recorded in Kwahu, is the same recorded for the Brong (i.e., Bono Techiman) a state northwest of the Asante.

== Dabɔne ==
Within the Adaduanan cycle are found four special days collectively called dabɔne (bɔne, evil); Fɔdwo, Awukudae, Fofi and Akwasidae.

The 42-day cycle may be thought to begin on Fɔdwo and the other three dabɔne follow in nine-day intervals; Awukudae on the tenth day, Fofi on the nineteenth day, and Akwasidae on the twenty-eighth day. It takes a further 14 days to complete the Adaduanan.

When Kurow (from kurow, town) of the six-day week coincides with a Wednesday of the seven-day week (on Kurow-Wukuo), or with a Sunday of the seven-day week (on Kurow-Kwasi), the two dabɔne most closely related to stool rites, Awukudae and Akwasidae (Wuko-Adae and Kwasi-Adae) are celebrated.

These two 'bad' days, related to death, are called adae (perhaps deriving from da, sleep, dae, slept or died or dream and eye, well [sic], implying that the ancestors should lie comfortably in their death), and are closely associated with politico-ritual symbols of gerontocracy sanctified or sanctioned by ancestor veneration.

No funerals may be held and no news of death may reach the ears of a chief (the living shrine of his ancestors) while libations of alcohol and offerings of food are made to the blackened stools (the permanent physical shrines of those ancestors) on an adae.

When Fo of the six-day week coincides with a Monday or Friday, the two dabɔne most closely related to tutelary spirits, Fɔdwo and Fofi, are celebrated. They are closely associated with medico-religious symbols or purification and the intervention of anthropomorphic spirits inhabiting natural objects such as rivers and caves.

The Asante sent messengers to Brong (i.e., Techiman) when in doubt about when to hold any festival, for the Brong were 'keepers of the King's calendar.'

These four 'holidays' are not complete vacations from all labour. No farming may be carried out on any dabɔne but work per se is not banned. Hunting and gathering are usually permitted and the people may go to their farms to carry home firewood or food reaped the previous day, so long as no weeding of farms is done. Often communal labour is performed on those dabɔne which are not filled with ritual and ceremonial activities.

== God Days ==
Apart from the four standard dabɔne, some gods may celebrate other days of the cycle, for example, the god Burukung, who was the senior god of the Guan on the Kwawu Afram Plains, and now the chief of the Kwawu abosom (tutelary spirits), since the sixteenth century Akan take-over of Kwawu (the principal shrine being a large, striking inselberg on the northern slopes of the Kwawu escarpment), celebrates the principal rites on Kwadwo (the Monday following Akwasidae).

The cult of Akonnedi, god of Late (Larteh) in Akwapim, which has branches in Kwawu, observes its most frequent public rites on Nkyi-Mene or Memenada Dapaa (the day prior to Akwasidae).

Various other gods in Kwawu are honoured on various other days in the 42-day cycle.

== Solar Year ==
The Adaduanan (This means 40 days, and 40 x 9 = 360, and the 9th Akwasidae is celebrated as Odwira, being the end of the past year and the beginning of the new year. Because Akwasidae must be on Sunday the 365 days occurs after the Odwira) do not precisely comprise the annual calendar, because nine cycles total 378 days instead of 365 1/4. Eight cycles yield only 336 days. Annually celebrated rites of the different Akan groups, such as the first yam eating festival, Odwira (ablution) or Afahye (public festival), are therefore celebrated each year on different days of the year. The priests of the various gods, in consultation with the various gods and ancestors, determine which Adaduanan cycle to choose for the annual rites, usually depending upon the ripening of the crops. Any series of annual rites is observed on the same days of the Adaduanan each year, although not on the same days of the year as reckoned by the Gregorian calendar.

== Months ==
The various Adaduanan cycles within the year are given a number of appellations, which are not the same from place to place, and of course never quite the same from year to year, since there are fewer than nine and more than eight cycles in any one year. OpƐpon (OpƐ, harmatan, dry season; pon, supreme) for example, more or less corresponds to the Adaduanan which appears about January–February in the middle of the dry season. Every three years or so, one of the nine named Adaduanan is omitted from the year because of the extra thirteen days gained when observing nine cycles a year. The names of the Adaduanan are therefore flexible and vary over time and cline.

Today some of the names for the Adaduanan cycles have been arbitrarily applied to the Gregorian calendar of twelve months by some Akan scholars, although there is no traditional basis for such a translation. For example, Opepon is now used for the Akan word for January even though in the traditional Akan calendar there is no concept exactly corresponding to the Roman month of January (Janus the god facing the past and future). The beginning and end of each Akan year tends to be the various yam festivals celebrated around August or September.

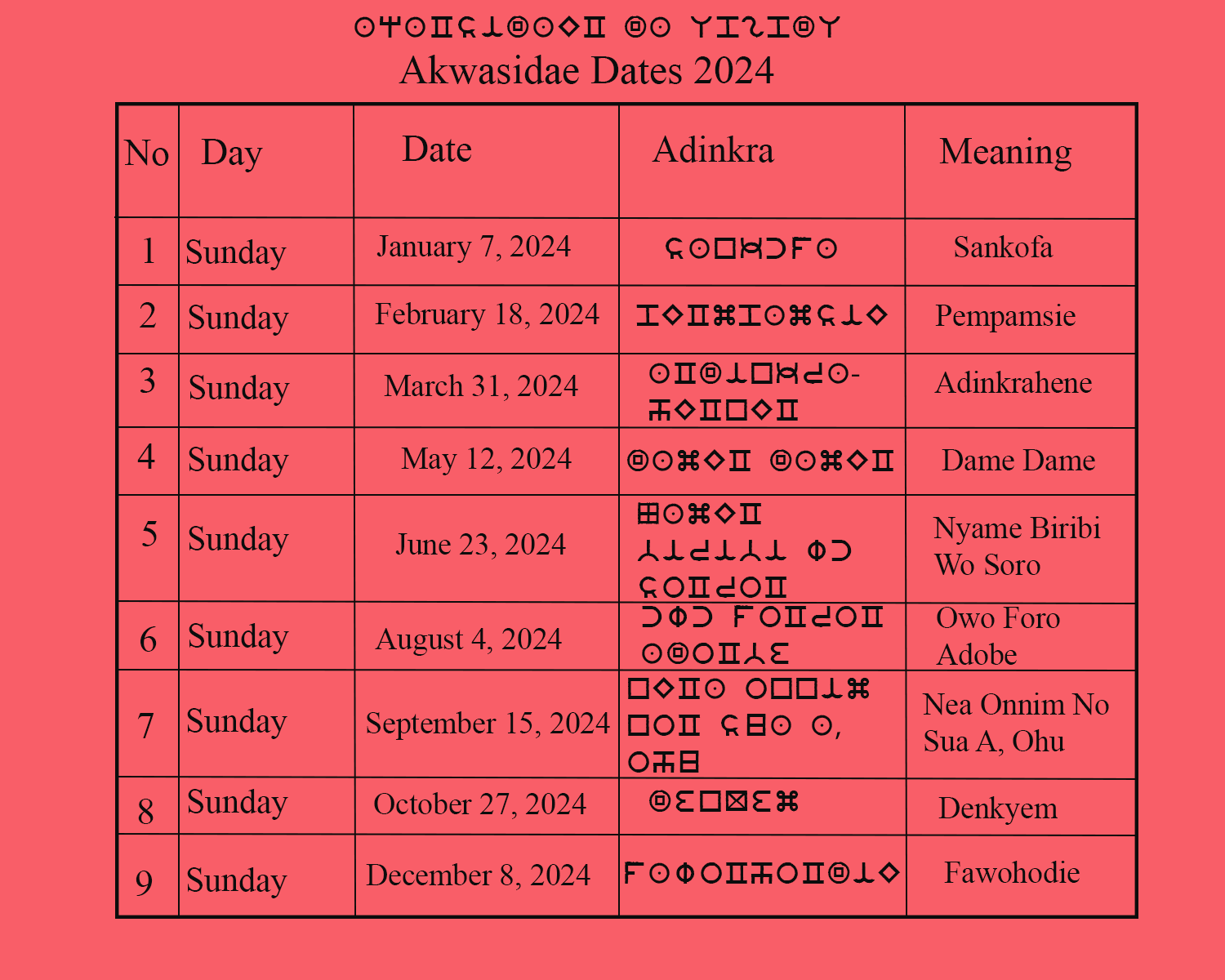
Akwasidae Calendar for year 2024

== Lunar Month ==
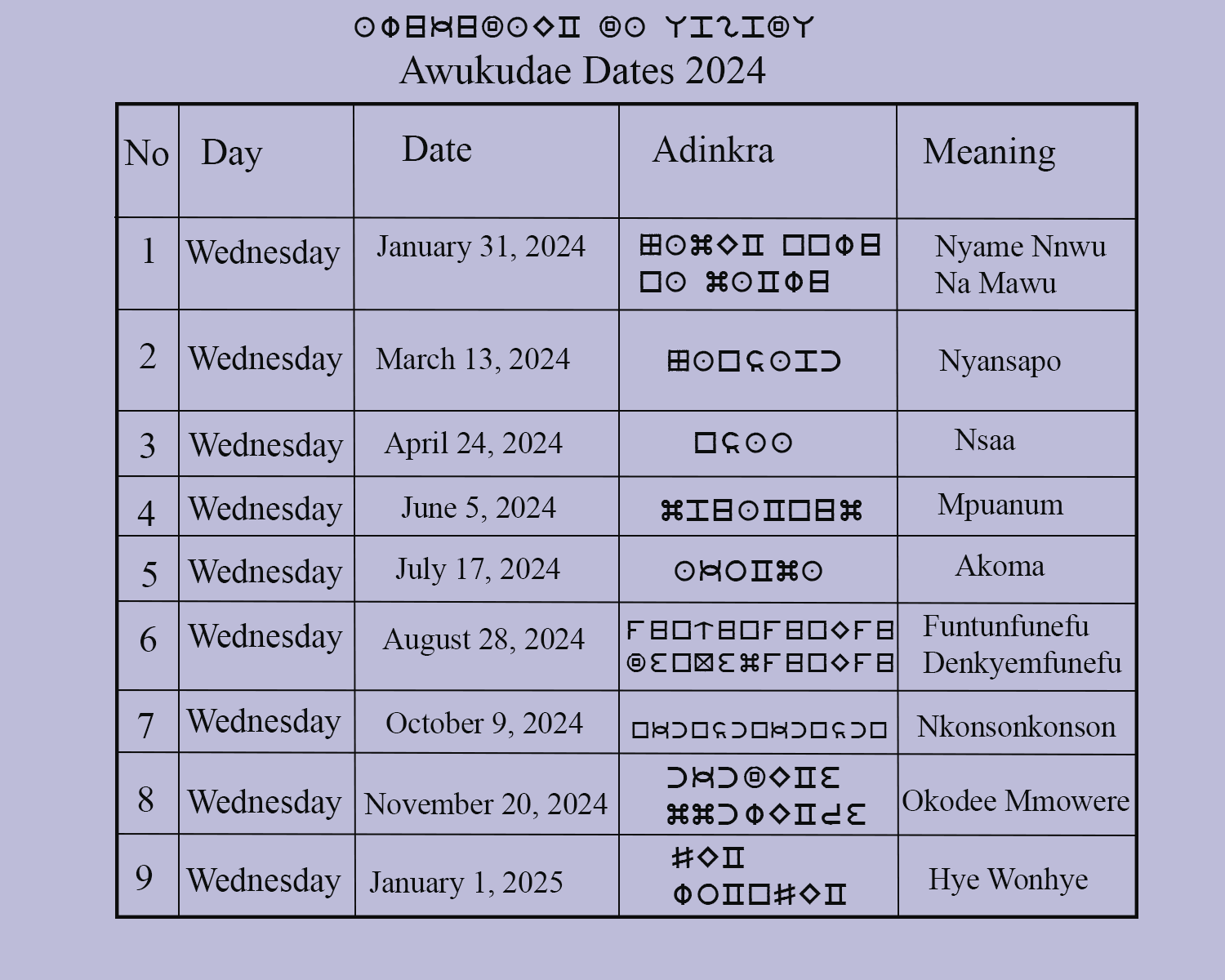
Awukudae Calendar for year 2024

The lunar cycle and 28-day month are not carefully observed, except by the coastal Akan who are interested in tides as they affect fishing. Still, the month is known as bosome. It consists of 28 days rather than the 30 or 31 days of the Gregorian calendar. Three bosome make two Adaduanan. Since the arrival of Swiss missionaries from Basel in the early nineteenth century, Christian Akan scholars have tended to 'Akanize' the Roman calendar rather than observe, analyse and explain the Akan calendar based on Adaduanan.

== Gregorian Calendar ==
It is quite easy to calculate the Akan calendar from the Gregorian calendar once a few keys are known. Understandably there is no equivalent in English to the six-day week. The seven-day week of the English and Akan calendars are, however, equivalent, with the suffix -da (day) added to the names of the days in the above list (Sunday is Kwasida, Saturday is Memenada, and so on). Every second year or so Easter occurs on an Akwasidae. In 1978, there are nine Akwasidae, celebrated on 8 January, 19 February, 2 March, 14 May, 25 June, 30 July, 6 August, 17 September, 29 October and 10 December, that is every sixth Sunday. The first four dabɔne of 1978 were Akwasidae (8 January), Fodwo (23 January), Awukudae (1 February), and Fofi (10 February). Other dabɔne may be calculated infinitely from these by adding or subtracting six-week intervals.

The synthesis of a six-day week and a seven-day week, forming the 42-day Adaduanan cycle may be added to numerous other items of evidence to support a theory of the origins and development of Akan culture which suggests that it is based on cultural diffusion and a compromise of observances having diverse origins.

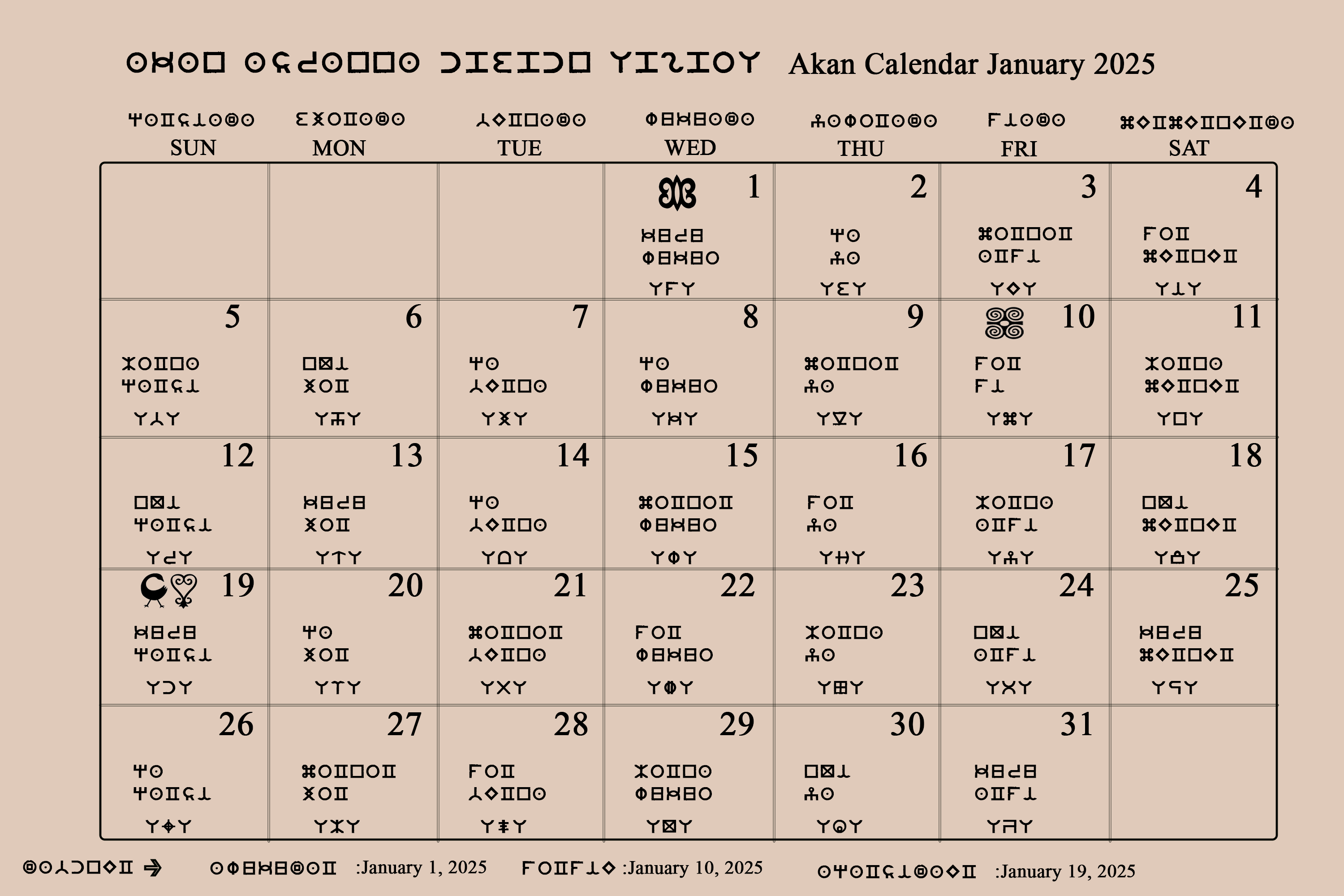
Asranna Opepon 2025 Akan Calendar for January 2025 with Adinkra Alphabet

== Additional References ==
- Boahen, K. Adu 1966 'The origins of the Akan,' Ghana Notes and Queries 9:3-10.
- Busia, K. A. 1951 The Position of the Chief in the Modern Political System of Ashanti. Gold Coast Government, reprinted for Oxford University Press by Cass, London.
- Fortes, M. 1963 'The Submerged Descent Line in Ashanti,' in I. Shapira (ed.) Studies in Kinship and Marriage. Royal Anthropological Institute, London
- 1963 'Ethnological Notes on the Distribution of Guan Languages,' Journal of African Languages 2(3).
- 1966 'The Akan and the North,' Ghana Notes and Queries 9: 18-24.
- 1968 'The Myth of a State.' Journal of Modern African Studies 6(4): 461-73.
- 1963 'A Medieval Trade Route from the Niger to the Gulf of Guinea, Journal of African History 3(2).
- McCall, Daniel. 2008. African weeks. In Hot Pursuit of Language in Prehistory, John Bengston (ed.), 25-36. Amsterdam: John Benjamins.

== Special Acknowledgement ==
- Bartle, Philip F.W. (January 1978). "Forty Days; The AkanCalendar". Africa: Journal of the International African Institute. 48 (1). Edinburgh University Press: 80–84. doi:10.2307/1158712. JSTOR 1158712. S2CID 143751434.

== See also ==
- Igbo calendar
- Yoruba calendar
- Efik calendar
