= NNE =

NNE may mean:

- north-northeast, a compass direction
- Newspapers of New England, Inc., a privately owned newspaper publisher
- the ISO 639-3 code for the Ngandjera dialect of the Ovambo language
- NNE A/S (Novo Nordisk Engineering), a subsidiary of pharmaceutical company Novo

Nne may mean:

- Nne, a two-part composition by Miles Davis on his album Dark Magus
- The Efik name for a grandmother
