= Philip Akoda =

Nigerian author, lexicographer and entrepreneur

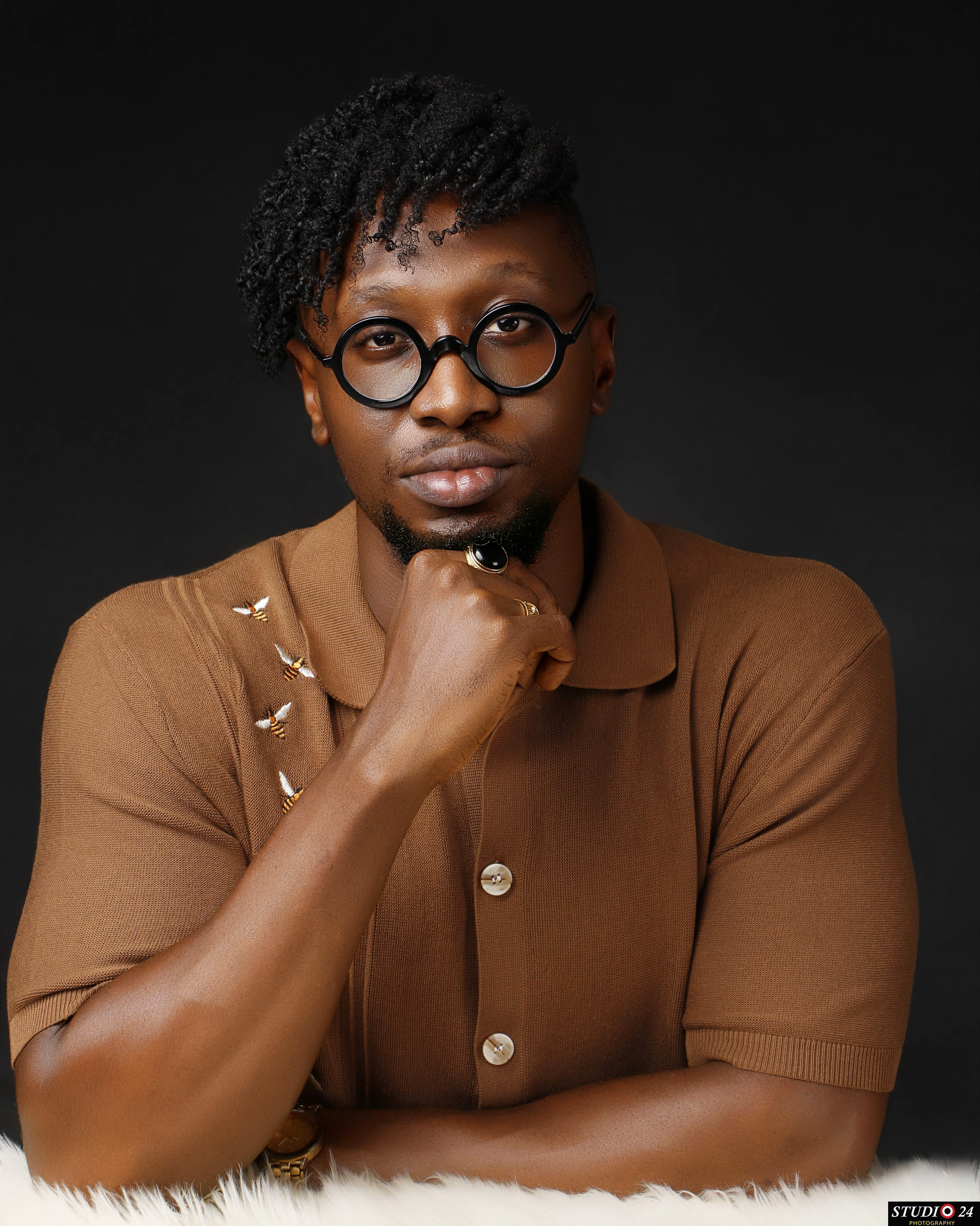
- Born: Philip Akoda; 1 May 1996 (age 30); Calabar, Nigeria
- Education: University of Essex; University of Derby (BS)
- Occupations: Author, lexicographer, entrepreneur
- Notable work: Ìṣura Ọ̀rọ̀ Yorùbá: A Comprehensive Yorùbá Thesaurus (2025)
- Title: Founder & CEO of Nkanda (formerly The AFLANG Project)
- Website: nkanda.com

Philip "Tete" Akoda (born 1 May 1996) is a Nigerian author, lexicographer, and entrepreneur. He has written several literary and reference works relating to African languages, including publications on the Efik language and a descriptive thesaurus of the Yorùbá language. He is the founder and chief executive officer of Nkanda, an educational technology startup focused on the digital documentation and preservation of African languages and cultures. Through Nkanda, Akoda has developed mobile language-learning and dictionary applications, including the first Efik language learning app on Google Play, as well as a bilingual Efik–English dictionary containing over 14,000 entries.

== Biography ==
Philip was born in Calabar, Nigeria, in May 1996. He is a great-grandson of Edidem Bassey Eyo Ephraim Adam III. He holds a Bachelor of Science degree (first class honours) in Business and Management from the University of Derby (2024). Before his studies at the University of Derby, Philip had previously attended the University of Essex during this time, he founded the AFLANG project (later known as Nkanda) and developed the first Efik Language Learning App. Due to the novel mobile app, Philip was invited to the UK House of Parliament to speak at the Black History Month event.

== Literary works ==
As an author, Philip has published several literary works which have greatly contributed to Efik literature including Learn Efik 1-2 which were his earliest literary works. Due to his knowledge on Efik history, Philip also co-authored Groundwork of Eniong Abatim History (1670-2020) with his mother, Prof Winifred Eyoanwan Akoda. Groundwork of Eniong Abatim History (1670-2020) focuses on the history of Eniong Abatim, an Efik-speaking community in the lower Cross River region of Nigeria. In 2022, Philip published A 21st Century Efik pocket Dictionary: Efik - English, English - Efik. Philip's publications have been adopted in several schools across Calabar, Nigeria. Beyond the Cross River region, Philip authored Ìṣura Ọ̀rọ̀ Yorùbá: A Comprehensive Yorùbá Thesaurus, a descriptive thesaurus focused on the Yorùbá language and its semantic structure. The work has been cited in discussions on African lexicography and digital language preservation.

== Digital contributions ==
Outside the literary space, Philip has championed several digital projects aimed at preserving and promoting African Languages and Cultures. Through Nkanda, he has published language learning applications for African Languages such as Ndebele, Oromo and Fante. One of Philip's most major contributions to the digital space was the Tete Efik Dictionary App. The Tete Efik Dictionary App is an Efik-English/English-Efik mobile dictionary app. Named after Philip whose Efik name is Tete, the app boasts of over 4,000 Efik words and 10,000 English words. It greatly stands out in the digital space due to the intricate details contained in the app some of which include phonemic transcription, definitions, sentence examples, synonyms, antonyms, history & etymology and audio pronunciations. In addition to the Tete Efik Dictionary App, Philip also spearheaded the development of the Yoruba Dictionary App. Released in 2024, the Yoruba Dictionary app contains extensive lexical data, including definitions, phonemic transcriptions, synonyms, antonyms, hypernyms, and hyponyms, along with audio pronunciations from native speakers. The app includes dialectal variations from over 12 Yoruba dialects, making it one of the most comprehensive digital resources for the Yoruba language. In 2025, Nkanda was awarded the imminent research grant to build its unified multilingual dictionary platform which will host Efik, Yoruba and Hausa Languages on debut.

== Awards & Recognition ==
- 2025 - Imminent Innovation Grant in Language Technology (Nkanda, Under Philip's leadership).
- 2025 - Association of Language Companies in Africa (ALCA) Outstanding Contribution to African Languages Award.
- 2024 - Mastercard Foundation FAST Program for Startups (Nkanda, Under Philip's leadership).

== Publications ==
- Ìṣura Ọ̀rọ̀ Yorùbá: A Comprehensive Yorùbá Thesaurus (2025), ISBN 978-978-918-912-0.
- A 21st Century Efik Pocket Dictionary: Efik–English, English–Efik (2022), ISBN 978-978-790-020-8.
- Groundwork of Eniong Abatim History (1670–2020) (2021), ISBN 978-978-940-886-3.
- Learn Efik Vol. 1 (2021), ISBN 978-978-918-680-8.
- Learn Efik Vol. 2 (2021), ISBN 978-978-918-681-5.

== Bibliography ==
- "Efik Language and Culture in the Twenty-first Century", Negroid Haven, March 14, 2023
- Akoda, Winifred E. (2022). "From Analogue to Digital: Using Digital Technology to Preserve and Promote Efik Language, Culture and History in the 21st Century" (PDF). Bassey Andah Journal. 15: 38–48.
- Andem, Ruth (April 1, 2023), "Celebrating the anniversary of the first Efik language mobile dictionary app", Paradise News, archived from the original on 1 April 2023
- "Tete Efik Dictionary App".
- "Meet Philip Akoda, Nigerian lexicographer championing Yorùbá language preservation through technology". vanguardngr.com. 2024-12-29.
- ""Learn Efik 1 and 2" by Philip Akoda". 11 July 2021.
- "Public Presentation of the Book: Groundwork of Eniong Abatim History", Scribd, Calabar: The Government Printer, 2021
- "Story behind the 1st Efik language learning app on google play, written by 20 year old Philip Akoda from Calabar". 25 February 2017.
- "Role Model Of The Week, 20 Year Old Philip Akoda- Developer Of 1st Efik Language Learning App On Google Play". 20 February 2017.
- Chaparadza, Alvine (19 October 2018). "You Can Easily Learn To Speak And Write In Ndebele With This New App". Techzim.
- "Our Youngest Ever Speaker At Our Black History Event, House Of Parliament, 22 Year Old Philip Akoda, Prepared To Take Centre Stage This Friday The 27th". 21 October 2017.
- "Imminent Research Grants – Projects Awarded". Imminent - The Translated's Research Center.
- MultiLingual Staff. "Translated Awards $100,000 in Imminent Research Grants to Pioneering Projects in Language AI". multilingual.com.
- Akoda, Philip (January 2026). "Nkanda: Preserving Africa's Languages in the Digital Age". ITI Bulletin. Institute of Translation and Interpreting. p. 9.
- MultiLingual Staff. "ALCA 2025: Africa's Role in the Global Language Services Industry". multilingual.com.
- Adeyemi, Olalere (2026). "A Review of Ìṣura Ọ̀rọ̀ Yorùbá - A Comprehensive Yorùbá Thesaurus" (PDF). Yoruba Studies Review. 11: 271–274.
