= Efik people =

Ethnic group in West Africa

Efik
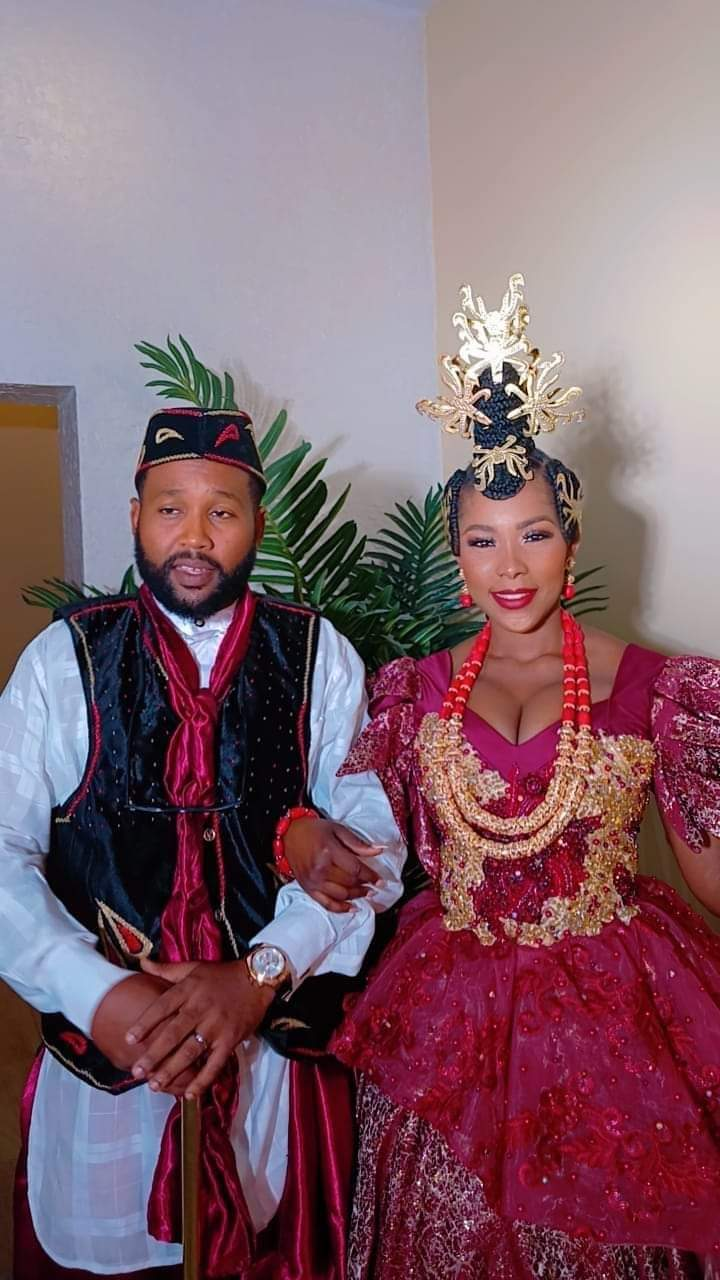
- An Efik couple

Total population
- 786,700

Regions with significant populations
- Nigeria, Cameroon
- Nigeria: 763,000
- Cameroon: 19,000
- United States: 15600

Languages
- Efik, English, French

Religion
- Christianity, Efik religion

Related ethnic groups
- Ibibio, Annang, Akamkpa, Eket, Ejagham (or Ekoi), Bahumono, Oron, Biase, Uruan, Igbo, Bamileke.

The Efik, also known as the Akwa Akpa people, are an ethnic group located primarily in southern Nigeria, and western Cameroon. They are related to the Akwa Ibom or Ibom people of Akwa Ibom State. Within Nigeria, the Efik can be found in the present-day Cross River State and Akwa Ibom State. The Efik speak the Efik language which is a member of the Benue–Congo subfamily of the Niger-Congo language group. The Efik refer to themselves as Efik Eburutu, Ifa Ibom, Eburutu and Iboku.

The bulk of the Efiks can be found in Calabar and the southern part of Cross River State. Prior to 1905, Old Calabar was a term used to describe the Efik settlements of Duke Town, Creek Town, Old town, Cobham town, Henshaw town, Adiabo and Mbiabo (consisting of Mbiabo edere, Mbiabo Ikot Offiong and Mbiabo Ikoneto). The Efik have also been referred to as "Calabar people" in historical literature. The term "Calabar people" was particularly popular prior to the nineteenth century and was synonymous with the Efik.

Efik society consists of various clans which were originally known as "Esien Efik itiaba" (Seven clans of Efik) and later known in the 21st century as "Esien Efik Duopeba" (Twelve clans of Efik). The original seven clans are scattered between Cross River state and consist of Iboku (Duke town, Henshaw town, Creek town and Cobham town), Obutong, Ito, Adiabo, Mbiabo (Mbiabo Edere, Mbiabo Ikot Offiong, Mbiabo Ikoneto), Enwang, Usukakpa and Abayen. The last three clans had greatly dwindled in number and many of their members are believed to have integrated into other Efik clans. Ibonda (an Efut clan) has sometimes been appended to Adiabo as one of the seven Efik clans. Other clans such as Biakpan, Utuma and Umon communities in Biase have shared Efik ancestry although they have not been historically part of the Efik Eburutu and therefore do not take part in the Esien Efik itiaba. Biakpan is also appended to the Obutong clan. The bulk of the Enwang and Usukakpa are located in the present-day Akwa Ibom state.

Modern Efik society is a melting pot of people of diverse origin. Due to the rise of Calabar as a commercial centre since the 18th century, Efik settlements experienced a high rate of inward migration consisting of Sierra Leoneans, Lebanese, Cameroonians, Jamaicans and several other communities. Children of Efik maternal descent are still regarded as Efik and have contributed to the development of the Efik society. Due to the volume of cultural exchange, many other ethnic groups have often been regarded as being one with the Efik such as Kiong and Efut.

The Efik were noted for their involvement in the slave trade where they acted as slave traders and middlemen between the inland slave traders and the Europeans. After the decline of the slave trade, the Efik transitioned into the business of exporting palm oil from the Cross river. Other trading items sold by the Efik included rubber, ivory, barwood and redwood. Throughout the centuries, Efik traders traded with the Portuguese, Dutch, English and French.

== Etymology ==
The name "Efik" translates to "Oppressors" and is derived from the Efik verb root "Fik" (English: Oppress). The first letter of the word is correctly written as "Ẹ" and denotes plurality. Several theories have been propounded on the origin of the word. One theory propounded by Okon and Nkpanam Ekereke asserts that the term "Efuk" was a word of defiance and an expression used by the Ibibio man when in a fit of rage. Ekereke and Ekereke further assert that the word was later changed to "Efik". This theory appears to be isolated as other Ibibio writers do not narrate that such terms were used by the Ibibio. Another theory which is narrated by Forde and Jones states that the name "Efik" translates to "Tyrants" or "He who oppresses" and was the name of which the Efik called themselves after they had settled at Creek town.

== Origin ==
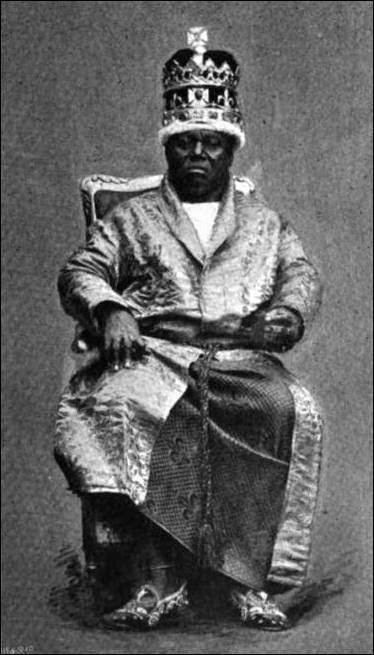
King Duke of Calabar, 1895.

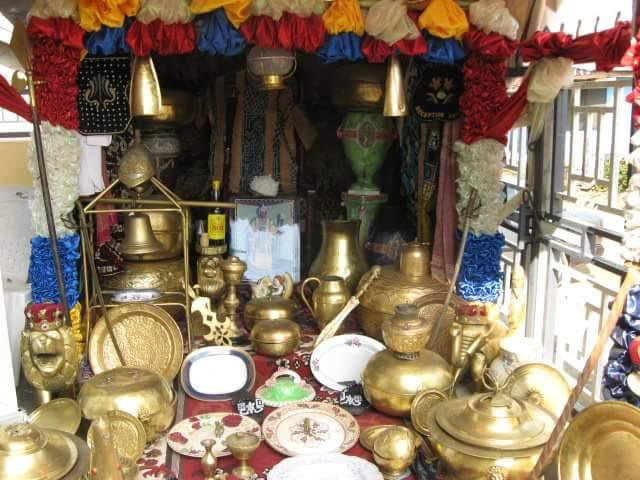
Mourning house of a deceased chief (An Efik custom)

=== Ancient origin ===
The predominant paternal haplogroup among the Efik is E1b1a1-M2. The ancestors of the Efik originally came from Northeast Africa and moved around the Green Sahara. The gradual movement of the Proto Efik to the Cross River Region may have been associated with the expansion of Sahel agriculture in the African Neolithic period, following the desiccation of the Sahara in c. 3500 BCE.

=== Igbo origin theory ===
The earliest proponent of the Igbo origin was William Baikie who stated in his 1856 publication, "All the coast dialects from One to Old Kalabar, are, either directly or indirectly, connected with Igbo, which later Dr Latham informs me is certainly related to the Kafir class". Baikie said Ibibio are traced to the Igbo. James Beale Horton made a similar assertion in 1868 where he asserted that all the communities of the Niger-delta are traced to the Igbo. Some oral accounts by early Efik men also support the Igbo origin of the Efik. One of such accounts was given at a court case by Prince Bassey Duke in 1917 where he stated, "The Efiks were originally Ibo descendants. They came from Mbiak Creek in Ibibio country." References to the Igbo origin of the Efik were also made at the Hart's enquiry into the Obongship dispute where Etubom Efiom Obo Effanga asserted that the term "Iboku" meant quarrelsome Igbos.

=== Ibibio origin theory ===
The Ibibio origin of the Efik is one of the most popular among scholars. Proponents of this theory range from missionaries, explorers, colonial anthropologists and later historians. While some explorers describe the Efik as travellers who passed through the Ibibio country, others assert that the Efik are of Ibibio stock. Among the earliest proponents of the Ibibio origin theory was Consul Hutchinson who stated in 1858, "The present inhabitants of Duke town, Old town and Creek town are descendants of the Egbo shary or Ibibio tribe up the Cross River." Colonial anthropologist M.D.W. Jeffreys said, "There is reason to believe that a considerable portion of a small Ibibio clan called Ebrutu or Eburutu was the earliest stock of the Efik; for, when the missionaries settled in 1846 at Old Calabar amongst these people for the first time, it was found that they called themselves not Efik but Ebrutu or Eburutu Efik." Jeffreys's assertion regarding Eburutu being a single Ibibio clan is proven false by earlier definitions of Eburutu by Rev. Hugh Goldie. Goldie describes Eburutu as a country that consists of various ethnic groups. This is further proven by Talbot who proves that other ethnicities appended the name "Eburutu" or "Oburutu" to their ethnic names.

== Akwa Akpa ==
Akwa Akpa was the original name of Calabar prior to the colonial time. This original name cements the original origin of the Efik people and their ancestral connection with the Akwa Ibom people, the Ibibio people.

=== Oriental origin theory ===
The Oriental original is most popular among indigenous Efik historians such as E.U. Aye and Eyo Okon Akak. This theory asserts that the Efik migrated from Palestine or somewhere close to Palestine. The main proponents of what is described as "Palestinean origin" is Eyo Okon Akak who wrote the book, "The Palestine origin of the Efik". Prior to Akak, the theory was proposed at the Hart's enquiry by Chief Offiong Abasi Ntiero Effiwatt and Etubom Ededem Ekpenyong Oku.

== History ==
=== Pre-Trans Atlantic slave trade era ===
Prior to the inception of the transatlantic slave trade, the Efik had undertaken a series of migrations before they reached the coasts of Old Calabar. Several oral accounts have been narrated on the Efik earlier migrations. The earliest accounts are narrated in the second half of the 19th century by explorers and missionaries. The most popular migration account within the Nigerian space asserts that the Efik people lived at Ibom in present-day Arochukwu and migrated from Ibom to Uruan.

==== Uruan ====
Oral tradition has it that the Efik arrived in Uruan in four groups i.e. Iboku, Enwang, Usukakpa and Abayen. At Uruan, they were ruled by a number of priest-kings Ndidem. Aye provides the following names among these priest-kings, including Ema Atai Iboku, Ekpe Atai Iboku, Ukpong Atai Iboku.

There are various theories as to why the Efik left Uruan. One was that the two peoples had separate religious customs and the Efik refused to worship the Uruan deity Atakpor Uruan Inyang. Etubom Ededem Ekpenyong Oku narrated this theory at the Hart's enquiry ? (1964) but it has been criticised by Uruan writers such as Dominic Essien.

Essien notes that Atakpor Uruan Inyang is one of the Efik deities. He also says that the Uruan had a saying, "Ke Ndem Efik Iboku, Atakpor ke Ekuk", which can be interpreted as "Where there is the Efik deity, there is also Atakpor Uruan to share with it." He says further that in some Efik trado-religious songs, Atakpor Uruan is greatly extolled. Etubom Ededem Ekpenyong Oku asserts that the Uruan accused the Efik of wizardry and of being responsible for the frequent seizure of their children by crocodiles. Oku adds that the Uruan were averse to the Efik custom of burying strangers with their dead and did not share in this practice carried out by the Efik. Another theory says that an Efik woman known as Abasi and an Uruan woman disagreed, leading their people in separate ways. Abasi is said to have borrowed an axe from an Uruan woman and had broken the axe. When the Uruan woman realised the damage, she insisted that the axe should be repaired. When the husband of the Uruan woman learnt of the issue, he wanted to fight the Efik. Abasi's husband insisted that the problem should be resolved by the chiefs. Abasi was angered by the Uruan woman and cursed the Uruan people, who started to punish her for her insubordination. The Efik came to her defence and the dispute escalated. Legend has it that this was the last straw that led to the Uruan-Efik war (known in Efik as Ekọñ Abasi-Anwan). The Efik subsequently left the Uruan country.

==== Ikpa Ene and Ndodoghi ====
On leaving the Uruan country, the Efik migrated to Ikpa Ene. It is nicknamed Akani Obio Efik (or English: Old Efik island). Ikpa Ene was a virgin island on the banks of the Cross river. The island is believed to be named after a fisherman from Mbiabo known as Ene Ankot.

According to Aye, "Ikpa Ene could not carry the bulk of Iboku population;, Ndodoghi had to accommodate what spilt over, and the two settlements, still under one rule, were separated by the left branch of the river which became their "inland sea". After the Efik had settled at Ikpa Ene, a party of men from Uruan arrived there. The men were wet and complained of hunger and fatigue. Having pity on these men, the Efik gave them food and showed them hospitality. At night when everyone had gone to sleep, the men from Uruan rose up and began to slaughter their hosts. When the Efik realised what was going on, they rose and fought back.

A captured invader confessed that they were set to retrieve royal emblems which they believed the Efik had taken with them when they left Uruan. The items believed to have been taken include Ikpaya (woven raffia robe), Akata (throne) and Ayang (Broom). Oku attests that it was the attack on the Efik that made them decide to leave Ikpa Ene, as they realised they were still too close to their enemies. Aye argues that the Efik could not have taken the royal emblem of the Uruan people as they would have already had their own royal emblem.

The Uruan invasion at Ikpa Ene is believed to be the origin of the Efik saying, "Ama okut Ibibio, ku nọ enye ikañ, Idem amasat Ibibio eyewot owo"(or English: When you see Ibibio do not give him fire(to warm himself), when he is dry he will kill you). When many of the Efik had left for Ndodoghi, a series of unfortunate events occurred. The Efik bard Adiaha Etim Anua recites in her 1910 ballad that "Mkpana Ndodoghi Edik. Ema Atai Ema Atai, Edidem, Biop sai." (Multiple Deaths at Ndodoghi creek, Ema Atai Ema Atai, Priest-king, lost his sight in death).

At Ndodoghi, the Efik priest-king Ema Atai Ema Atai died and was succeeded by his son Eyo Ema Atai Ema Atai Iboku. It is believed that many of the Abayen clan had died from crocodile attacks at Ndodoghi. Talbot asserts that a great cotton tree had fallen down on many of the Abayen and in their pride of numbers, they believed they could hold the cotton tree. The outcome of the fall of the tree led to several deaths in their clan. Due to the number of unfortunate incidents at Ikpa Ene and Ndodoghi, the Efik sought to leave these islands.

There are said to have been at least three mass migration from Ndodoghi. One account narrates that the Mbiabo group left first, settling in their present location while the Iboku, Enwang and other clans were still at Ndodoghi. The Adiabo group is believed to have left to their present location after the Mbiabo exodus. The largest group moved to Creek town from Ndodoghi, led by the priest-king Eyo Ema Atai.

==== Creek Town ====
It is uncertain what year the Efik arrived at Creek Town. Several periods have been estimated by foreign scholars and indigenous historians. Aye dates the arrival of the Efik in Creek Town to the fourteenth century. Latham hypothesizes that the Efik may have arrived before the middle of the seventeenth century. K.K. Nair dates the arrival of the Efik towards the end of the seventeenth century or the beginning of the eighteenth century.

Stephen D. Behrendt and Eric J. Graham revealed in a 2003 publication that, by the time the first documented European sailing vessel arrived in 1625, the Efik had already settled at Creek Town and Old Town.

There are different versions of the arrival of the Efik at Creek Town. According to Simmons, "Most Informants maintain that the first people to Inhabit Creek Town were Efut fishermen from the southern Cameroons." Simmons assertion, which he made in his 1958 dissertation, is repeated in similar form at the Hart's enquiry in 1964 by chiefs such as Chief Efiom Obo Effanga of Obutong. Other narratives at the Hart's enquiry do not mention he Efut.

In his 2000 work, Aye does not mention the Efut as being the primary occupants. There does seem to be consensus that the Efik arrived at Creek Town led by Edidem Eyo Ema Atai, together with Oku Atai Atai Ema Atai, Ukpong Atai Atai Ema Atai, Adim Atai Atai Ema Atai, Efiom Ekpo Efiom Ekpo and several others. Eyo Ema's people occupied Otung in the south of Creek Town, Adim Atai and Ukpong Atai occupied the east, and Efiom Ekpo's family occupied the Adakuko in the west. Internal dissensions and population expansion led to the movement of several families from Creek Town to Obutong, Atakpa, Nsidung and Ekoretonko.

=== 16th century ===
==== Founding of Obutong (Old town) ====
It is uncertain when Obutong was founded but most Efik scholars hypothesize that it was founded in the 16th century during a conflict that emerged with their Biakpan and Umon brothers who were further pushed away from Obutong to present-day Biase . Several accounts have been given on the migration of the Efiks from Creek town to Obutong shortly after this Biakpan conflict. One theory asserts that Ukpong Atai Atai Ema Atai, Adim Atai Atai Ema Atai and other co-founders ruled Obutong after one of Eyo Ema's people was killed during a wrestling match with Ukpong Atai at Creek town. On their exit from Obutong, they are believed to have sought the permission of Oku Atai to use the Ntinya. At the time of their exit from Creek town, the reigning monarch of Creek town was their half brother Oku Atai Atai Ema Atai. On the founding of Obutong, Colonial anthropologist M.D.W. Jeffreys states that a disruption among the Okobo around the town of Ekeya in the Eket district led to the founding of Obutong. Jeffreys theory is unpopular with a large majority of the Efik. Another theory narrated by Chief Efiom Obo Effanga of Obutong asserts that Antia Ekot Otong founded Obutong. Antia Ekot Otong is regarded as one of the descendants of the patriarch Otong Ama Ide.

=== 17th century ===
==== Founding of Atakpa (Duke town) ====
By the seventeenth century, more Efik settlements had been founded. Although Duke town is believed to have been occupied since the 15th century by the Enwang, it was not until the 17th century that the Efiom Ekpo families moved in large waves to the site. Prior to the arrival of the Efiom Ekpo group, oral tradition has it that when some Efik migrated to Creek town from Ndodoghi, The Enwang did not join them but migrated to the present site of Duke town. The Enwang are believed to have ruled Atakpa for a number of years. Their king on the eastern Calabar coast was known as Ating Anua Efiom. Several events at Creek town later led to a wave of migration from Creek town to Duke town.

At Creek town, the Efik ruler was Efiom Ekpo Efiom Ekpo, who had a number of children including Nsa Efiom, Edem Efiom, Okoho Efiom and Odo Efiom. Okoho Efiom bore twins, whose paternal parentage have often been debated. Due to the traditional custom of killing twins, considered to be unlucky, Edem Efiom is said to have aided Okoho Efiom in escaping from Creek town to go to Nsutana.

Nsutana was an where twins were traditionally abandoned to die. Okoho Efiom bore the twins at Nsutana and raised them for years. When the twins were older, they went to the opposite end of the island to Duke town. The Enwang people who were fishing at Duke town saw the twins approaching and fled in terror, saying "Mbiomo oduk ine"(English: A curse has befallen our fishing sites).

The Enwang people moved to the present site of Henshaw town.

== Efik and the Ibibio People ==
The Efik and the Ibibio people are from the same ancestors and share the same language (with little variation of dialect and names. They are homogeneous people of the Coastal South East of Niger Delta as well as Coastal South Esat of South South Geopolitical Region.

=== Trade ===
Efik traders played a major role during the era of the Transatlantic slave trade. The Efik acted as the middlemen between Europeans and the inland slave traders. Although Behrendt and Graham reveal that Calabar had been a major trading port since the first half of the seventeenth century, Efik historians such as Aye assert that the Efik had been trading with the Europeans since the last quarter of the 15th century. Aye uses Adiaha Etim Anwa's ballad as one of the basis for his hypothesis. The earliest list of Efik traders is provided in Jean Barbot's manuscript, which was later printed in 1732. Barbot documents that, between 1698 and 1699, payments for provisions were made at Calabar to the following chiefs: Duke Aphrom, King Robin, Mettinon, King Ebrero, King John, King Oyo, William King Agbisherea, Robin King Agbisherea, and Old King Robin. It was common for Efik traders to take up trading names during the period of the transatlantic slave trade.

The Efik often anglicised their names to gain the trust of European traders. Names such as Okon became Hogan, Orok became Duke, Akabom became Cobham, Ene became Henry, Asibong became Archibong. The name "Agbisherea" (also known as Egbosherry) appended in the names of the two kings listed by Barbot, was the name of the country, on the coast of which they traded from. Aphrom was a corruption of Ephraim, which was an anglicised form of the Efik name Efiom.

Some of the kings have been identified in the past by Etubom Ukorebi Ukorebi Asuquo in Aye's Efik people. According to Asuquo,

Asibong Eso of Obutong was Old King Robin; Ekpenyong Efa of Adiabo was King John; Ani Eniang Nkot of Mbiabo Ikoneto was Robin King Agbisherea; Oku Ukpong Eton Ani of Mbiabo Ikot Offiong was William King Agbisherea; while Ukorebi Neneng Esien Ndem Ndem of Obomitiat Ikoneto was King Ebrero

Originally, the Efik obtained slaves by going to war with other communities or creating confusion in other communities and capturing slaves in raids. In the latter case, villagers would be kidnapped and sent to Calabar, where they were sold.

A testimony by Isaac Parker, a ship-keeper who lived at Duke town in 1765 for 5 months, talked about this. According to Parker,

When there, Dick Ebro' asking him to go to war with him, he complied, and accordingly having sitted out and armed the canoes, they went up the river, lying under the bushes in the day when they came near a village; and at night flying up to the village, and taking hold of everyone they could see. These they handcuffed, brought down to the canoes, and so proceeded up the river, till they got to the amount of 45, with whom they returned to New town, where sending to the captains of the shipping, they divided them among the ships.

By the 18th and 19th centuries, the Efik strategy for filling the international demand for slaves was via obtaining slaves from inland slave traders, such as Eniong, Ndokki and Arochukwu.

=== 18th century ===
==== Western education ====
Prior to the arrival of the missionaries in 1846, many Efik traders were fluent in English and a number of African and European languages. Efik traders could speak, write and read the English language. Many families sent their children to European captains to teach them English and the processes involved in the international trade. The earliest documented letter to an English captain from a chief of Old Calabar was written in 1770. The diary of Antera Duke, an Efik, is the only surviving record from an African slave-trading house. Antera Duke also known as Ntiero Edem Efiom was an Efik trader whose diary reveals several daily activities in Old Calabar between 1785 and 1788

==== Ekpe society ====
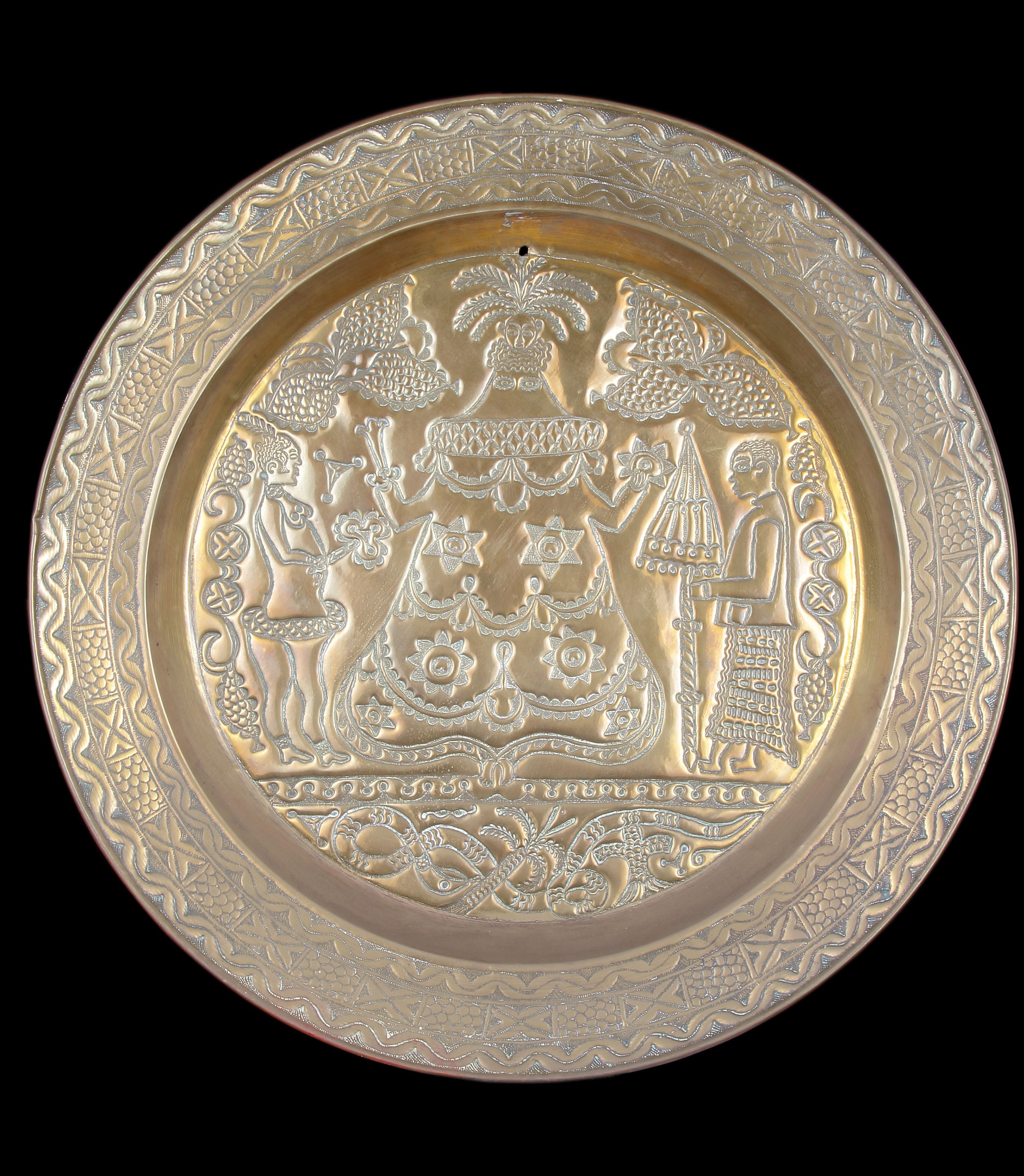
Brass plate depicting an Ekpe spirit

Law and order in Efik society was maintained via a number of secret societies. Some of the oldest of these societies were Nyana Nyaku and Nsibidi. The Ekpe society is estimated by most foreign scholars to have been introduced into Old Calabar in the 18th century. Ekpe is first mentioned in the historical literature of Old Calabar in the 1770s. According to Rev. Hope Waddell in 1863,

Foreign commerce soon brought Calabar affairs into such a state, that the want of a bond of union among the different families, and of a supreme authority to enforce peace and order between equals and rivals, became apparent; and the Egbo institution was adopted. It was found in operation among a tribe down the coast towards Cameroons, but was improved and extended in its new field of operations.

=== 1841–1892 ===
The year 1841 marked the official signing of papers by Efik kings to stop the exportation of slaves from Old Calabar. These papers were signed by the reigning monarchs of Creek town and Duke town who were Eyo Honesty II and Eyamba V. King Eyamba and King Eyo had written letters to the British requesting that they bring in teachers to teach them trade and commerce and missionaries to aid them to know more about God. The first missionaries arrived in 1846. Among these missionaries were Rev. Hope Waddell, Samuel Edgerley and four others. These missionaries together with King Eyo Honesty II brought several changes to Old Calabar society. Laws were passed to halt several practices regarded as unchristian. Among these laws were the Abolition of twin-killings, abolition of the esere bean ordeal, abolition of human sacrifices and several other practices.

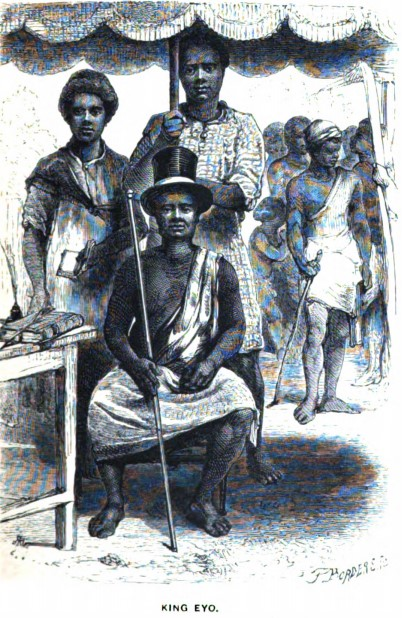
King Eyo Honesty II, Ruler of Creek town

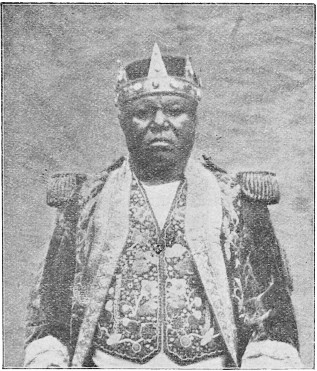
Duke Ephraim IX of Old Calabar

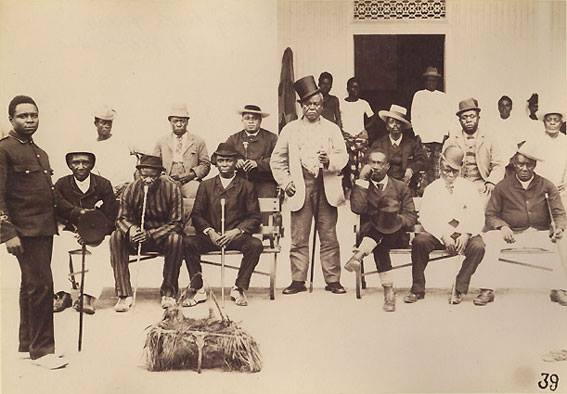
Kings and Chiefs of Old Calabar (1890)

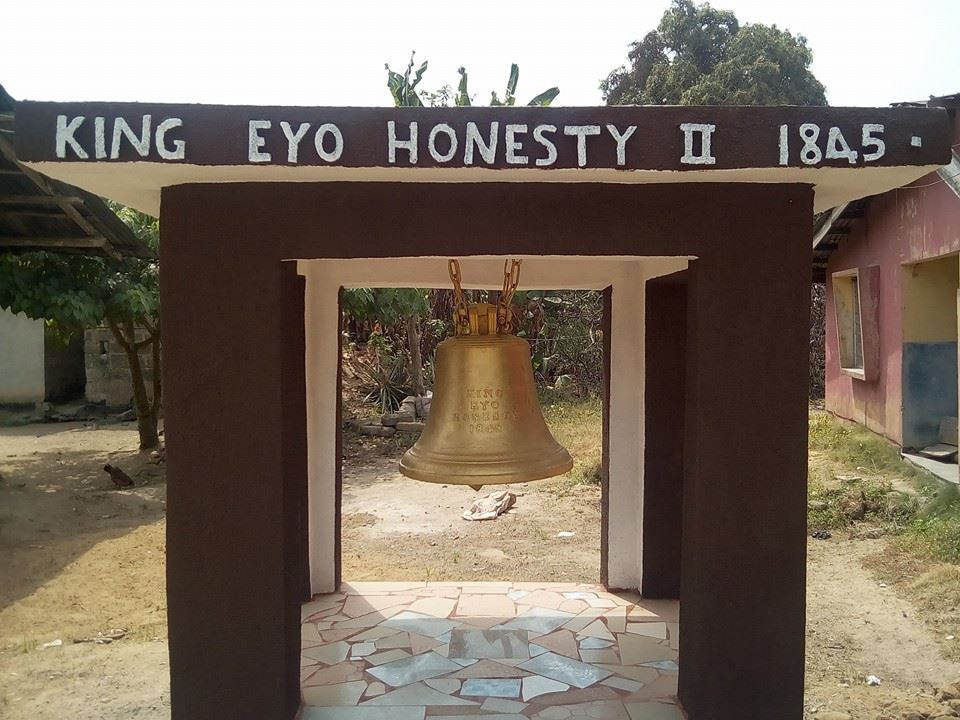
Bell of King Eyo Honesty II at Creek Town

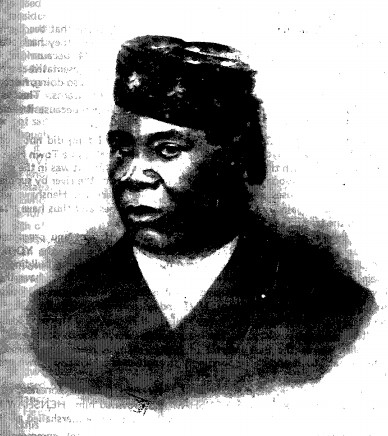
Ekeng ita (also known as James Henshaw), Obong of Henshaw Town (c.a 1875)

==== Missionary arrival ====
As the slave trade was declining due to the strong global campaign against it, the effects on slave trading ports along the African coast was greatly experienced. At Old Calabar, traders had slowly started transitioning completely into the lucrative palm oil trade. Due to the fall in global demand for slaves and several other factors, the kings and chiefs of Old Calabar wrote to the British requesting that they send teachers and missionaries to Old Calabar to establish industries and introduce the religion of the white man to them. One of such letters written by King Eyamba V and the chiefs of Old Calabar states:

Now we settle treaty for not sell slave, I must tell you something, I want your Queen to do for we. Now we can't sell slaves again we must have too much man for country; and want something for make work and trade, and if we could get seed for cotton and coffee we could make trade. Plenty sugar cane lives here and if some man must come for teach book proper, and make all men saby God like white man, and then we go on for same fashion. We thank you too much for what thing you come do for keep thing right. Long time we no look Man-of-War as Blount promise one Frenchman come make plenty palaver for slave when we can't get them. You been do very proper for we, and now we want to keep proper mouth. I hope some Man-of-War come sometime with proper captain all same you look out and help we keep word when French Man-of-War come. What I want for dollar side is a fine coat and sword all same I tell you and the rest in copper rods. I hope Queen Victoria and young prince will live long time and we get good friend. Also, I want bomb and shell.

I am your best friend King Eyamba V

King of all blackman

Letters were also sent by King Eyo Honesty II to introduce missionaries and technocrats into the country with emphasis on the latter. These letters were heeded to and in April 1846, the first missionaries arrived Old Calabar.

==== Bombing of Obutong ====
The destruction of Obutong occurred in 1854. On the death of Chief Willy Tom Robins, a number of rituals were performed. A number of people were hanged, shot and buried with the late chief according to the custom. These atrocities angered the missionaries and European captains alike. The breach of agreement to halt such practices was punished by blowing Ekpe on Obutong and forbidding funeral rites of the chief until the murderers were brought to justice. The missionaries respected the native law but the European Captains acted rashly and desired that an example be set on Obutong. The Captains wrote the acting consul who was stationed at Fernando Po. They insisted that Obutong be completely destroyed. Although the missionaries and rulers of Creek town and Duke town protested, their protests fell on deaf ears. Cannons were shot at the town and every house was levelled to the ground. It took several years before the town was rebuilt.

== Language ==
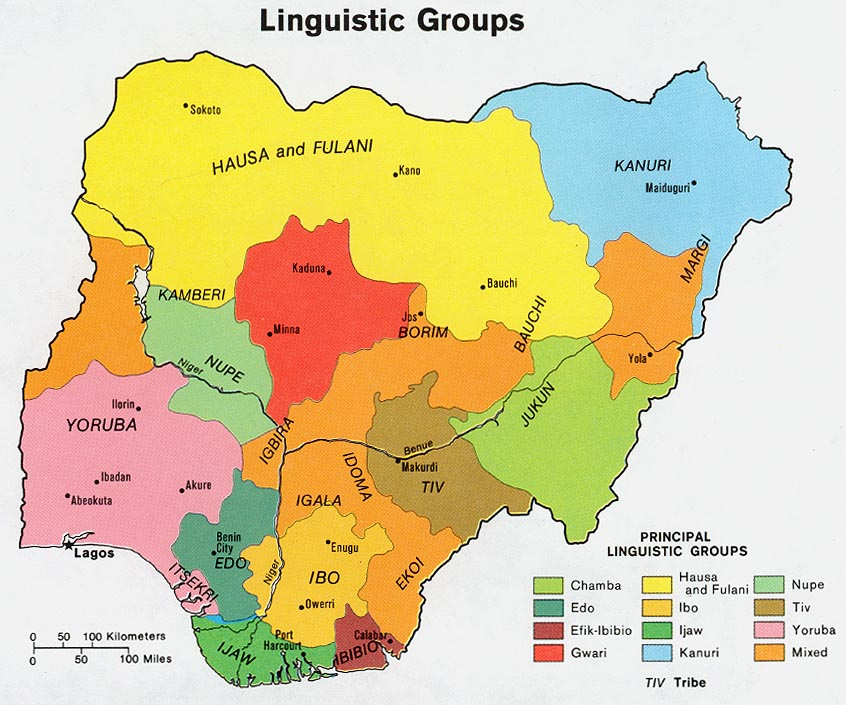
Ethno-linguistic groups in Nigeria. Efik-Ibibio in burgundy at bottom.

The Efik people speak the Efik language, which is a Benue–Congo language of the Cross River family. Due to the peregrinations of Efik traders across the lower Cross River region, The Efik language was regarded as the language of commerce in the Cross River region. The Efik language also borrows words from other ethnic groups such as Balondo, Oron, Efut, Okoyong, Efiat and Ekoi (Qua). The Efik language was also spoken in several communities in Western Cameroon. As of 1877, Alexander Ross reported that thirteen towns in the Cameroon region speak Efik and had an aggregate population of about 22,000. Communities within the greater Calabar area such as Efut, Kiong, Qua, Biakpan, Umon and many other communities around Biase and Akamkpa also speak and understand the Efik language. Due to the support of the missionaries, the Efik language became the language of religion. During the colonial era, The Efik language was the only language taught in schools in many parts of the present-day Cross River and Akwa Ibom state.

== Demographics ==
The language spread of Efik in the United States according to U.S. Census 2000

Efik populations are found in the following regions:

- Cross River State, Nigeria
- Akwa Ibom State, Nigeria
- Bioko, Equatorial Guinea
- Western Cameroon

== Culture ==
=== Secret societies ===
Secret societies aided in the maintaining of law and order at Old Calabar. Among these secret societies were Ekpe, Obon, and Nsibidi.

==== Ekpe ====
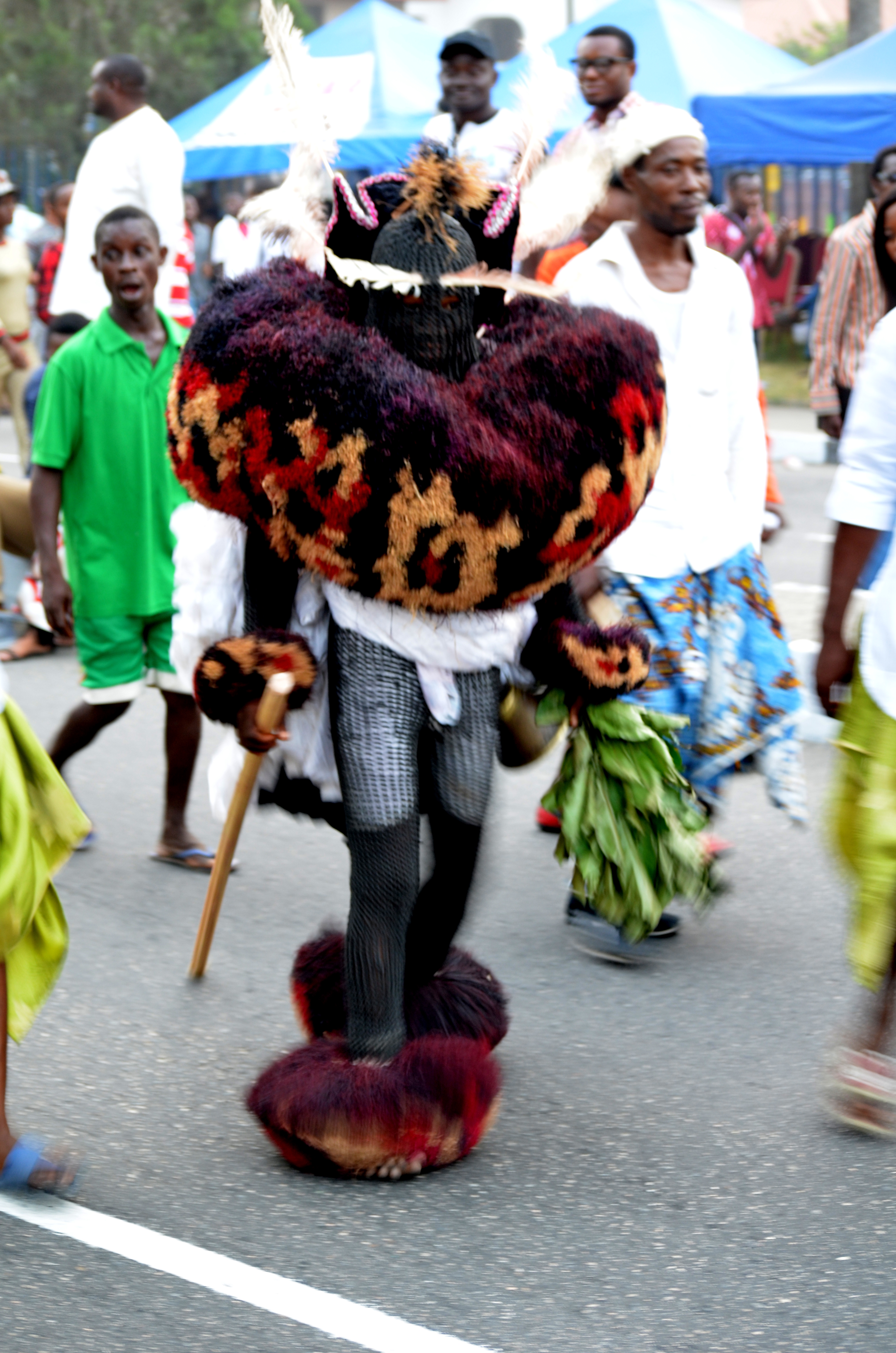
Ekpe Masquerade

The Ekpe society may be regarded as one of the most important institutions among the Efik people. The society is believed to have been introduced in Calabar from Usahadet.

On the appending of the Ekpe institution to its list of secret societies, the Ekpe society was reformed and adapted to suit the needs of the Efik people. Ekpe translates to 'Leopard' in the Efik language and is believed to be a spirit that resides in the forest. The Ekpe spirit cannot be seen by the uninitiated and is represented by Idem Iquo, a masquerade dressed in Esịk, a multi-coloured costume decorated with other traditional accoutrements.

The society is divided into five main grades such as Nkanda, Oku akama, Nyamkpe, Okpoho and Ebonko. Each grade has a chieftain or an Obong. According to E.U. Aye,

Originally Ekpe Fraternity was for religious purposes, but as the Calabar community became complicated owing to the new wealth which the early trade with Europeans brought, it was quickly adapted to fulfil other economic and civil functions. It proved to be the source of supreme authority in all Efik towns, and its institutions provided, in the past, the highest court whose verdicts transcended all else. Ekpe could take life and could give it; it could condemn a whole town to a heavy fine and was promptly paid; it could punish offenders and could forgive; even kings and Obongs could never escape Ekpe laws and edicts.

Due to the Obutong massacre of 1765 and several other incidents, the Ekpe society of Old Calabar was transformed into the Abakuá cult in Cuba, the Bonkó cult in Bioko, and the Abakuya dance in mainland Equatorial Guinea.

=== Cuisine ===
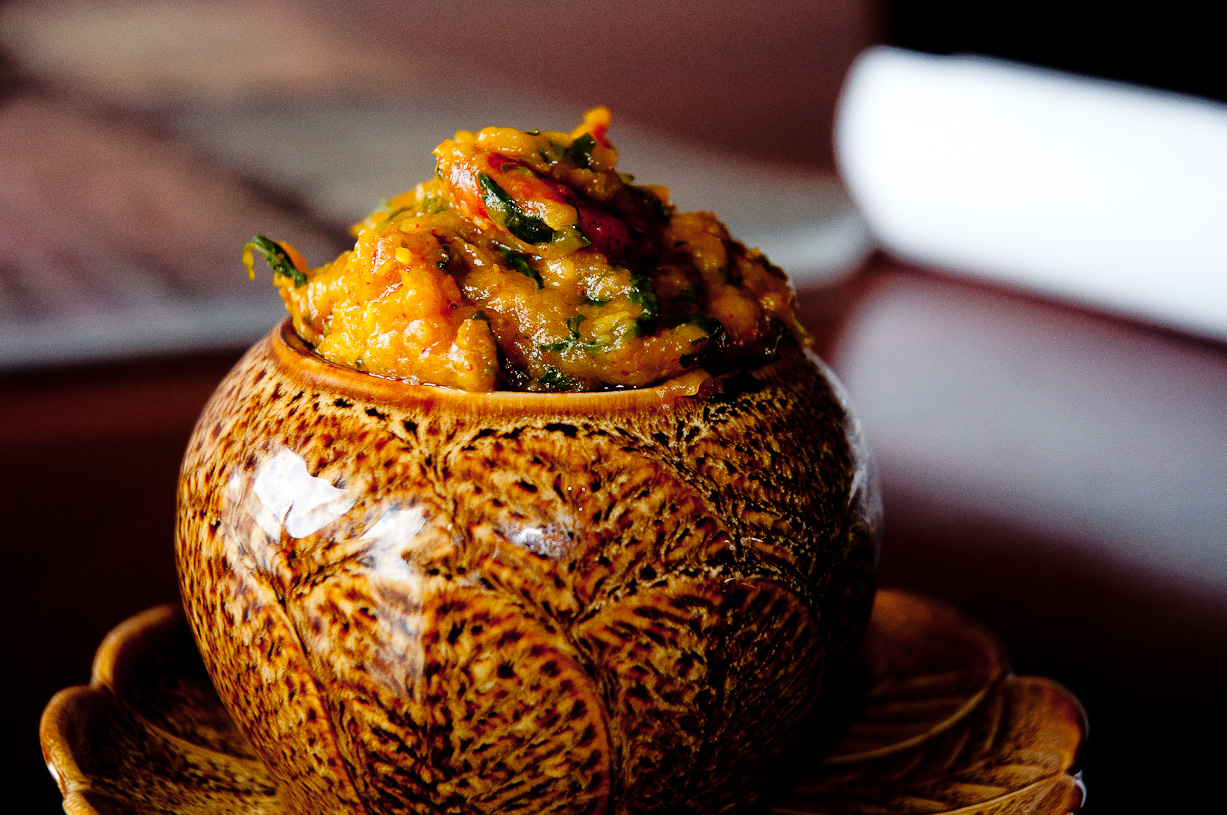
Ekpang nkukwo

The Efik people are well known for a diverse number of cuisines. Among these cuisines include Ekpang nkukwo, Edikang Ikong, Afia efere, Anyan Ekpang, Afang soup and several others. Originally, items such as onions (Oyim mbakara) was rare in Efik meals. Large amounts of pepper was also uncommon in Efik cuisines. Prior to the introduction of industrialised cubic-shaped seasonings such as maggi and Knorr, Crayfish was used to make meals spicier. Some meals have been mentioned often in the 19th century historical literature of Old Calabar. Among these included Yams, Fufu and an unidentified type of black soup frequently mentioned in 19th century Old Calabar literature. Several meals were composed of yam such as Usuñ abia, Iwụk abia, Afia abia, Ọsọbọ abia, Edifrai abia and Ọfọp abia. Meals such as Iwewe were fed to children and old people with no teeth or fragile teeth. Iwewe is a type of boiled yam mashed with a small amount of palm oil and stirred with a spoon. Iwewe is also regarded as a sacrificial meal often prepared for the Efik deities. Meat and fish are the major sources of protein in Efik cuisines. Animals such as goats, chicken and dogs are consumed in Efik cuisine. Cow meat was also consumed but the Efik native cow was rarely eaten or milked by the Efik. The Efik native cow (English: Enañ Efịk) was regarded with some amount of reverence and was mainly killed on rare occasions such as the festival for the installation of a new priest king. The Efik also manufacture a number of beverages such as Mmịn Efik (Palm wine), Ufọfọp (Native gin), Lemon grass tea (Nnyannyaña), Mmịn Eyop (Eyop wine). Palm wine is acquired by making an incision on the palm tree, a process known as "tapping". After the tapping process, the wine is left to ferment for five hours. Alcoholic content may be increased via adding the red bark of Edat (Sacoglottis gabonensis) to the wine. Ufọfọp (native gin) is distilled from palm wine and is sometimes mixed with the bark of Edat to increase the alcoholic content.

=== Clothing and adornment ===
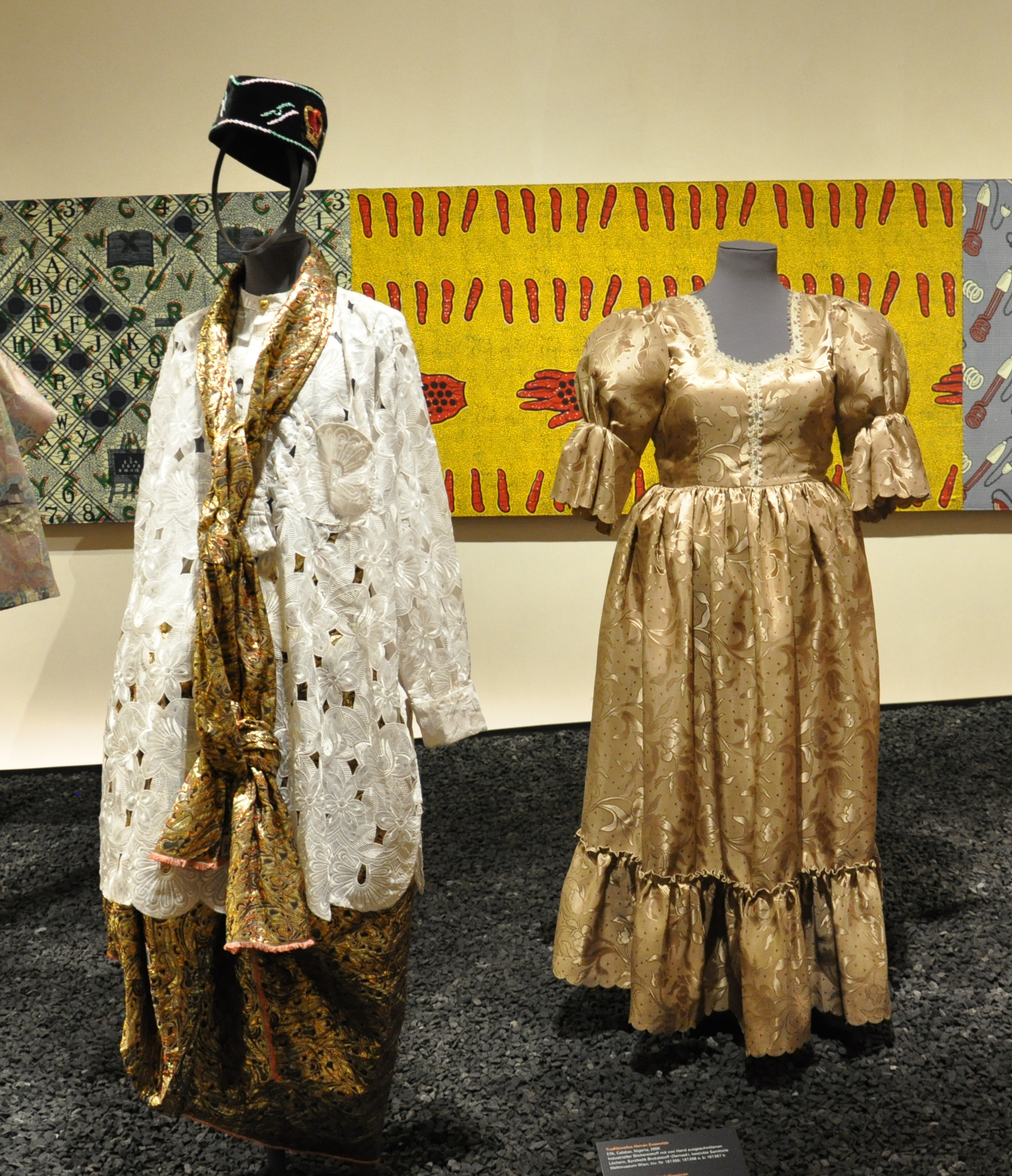
Traditional Efik male and female attire

Prior to the introduction of European-styled clothing, the Efik wore loin clothes made of Raffia (Efik: Ndam). The fibre of the leaf-stalk of a palm was made into a thread and woven to make clothes and bags. Raffia palm clothing (Efik: Ọfọñ Ndam) could also be exported from other communities especially when a community made the best raffia clothing. Ikpaya a royal type of gown also made from raffia. Ikpaya is now worn by an Obong-elect during the traditional coronation ceremony. Women wore a number of brass rings on their legs and arms. Ivory bracelets (Efik: Mme) were worn by wealthy women. With the inception of the transatlantic slave trade, a number of foreign clothes were introduced into Efik society. Oral tradition holds that a type of clothing known as "Itu ita" was the earliest fabric imported into Old Calabar. This material is believed to have been imported by the Portuguese (Oboriki). The Portuguese are said to have arrived in masted ships. The name Itu ita translates to three manatees and is named because the masts of the ship resembled the manatee (Itu). Some other clothing introduced into the market include smit, brutanya, isadọhọ and nkisi. The missionaries who arrived in 1846 contributed to the changes in women's attire in Efik society. Several types of English dresses were introduced to Efik women such as the Victorian dresses known in Efik as Ọnyọnyọ. Over the years, the Victorian dress has been modified and given what is regarded as a dignified African look. In modern-day Efik society, Ọnyọnyọ is worn on various occasions such as weddings and traditional events. The dress is often worn with ornaments such as necklaces and earrings made of coral beads. During weddings, the bride wears at least two different Ọnyọnyọ. The traditional attire for men usually consists of a white long-sleeved shirt, a long broad soft neckerchief or scarf of costly material (Efik: Ọkpọmkpọm) and a wrapper tied around the waist (Efik: Usobo).

== List of notable Efik and people of Efik descent ==
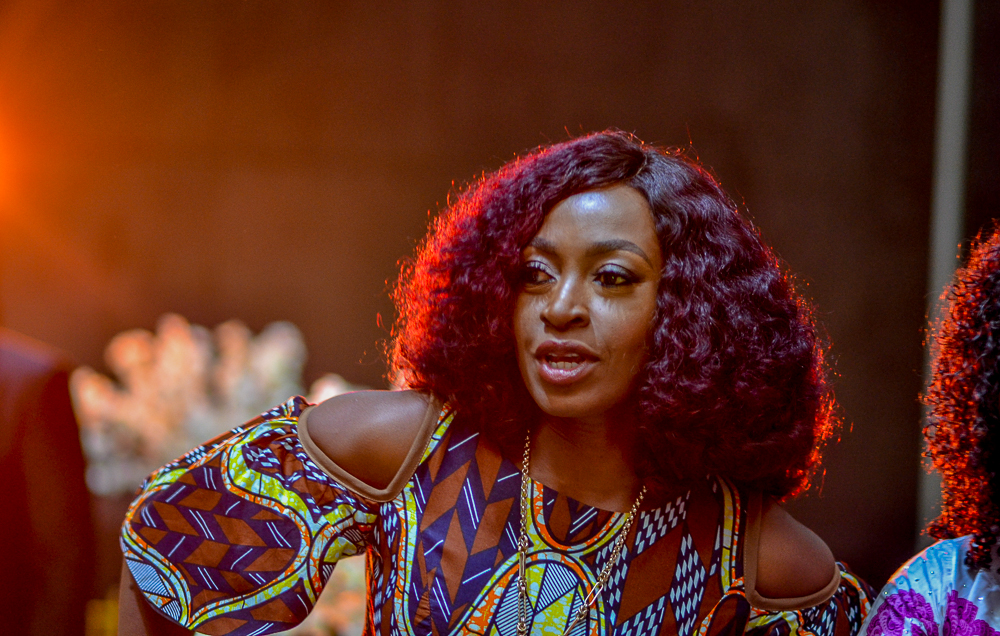
Kate Henshaw at Lawrence Onochie 50th birthday09 04 40 659000

=== Business and economics ===
- Affiong Williams, Nigerian entrepreneur.
- Abasi Ene-Obong, Nigerian biomedical scientist and entrepreneur.
- Philip Akoda, Nigerian author, lexicographer and entrepreneur.

=== Arts and media ===
- Kate Henshaw, Nigerian actress.
- Daniel Etim Effiong, Nigerian Nollywood actor and film director.

=== Politics, military and resistance ===
- Donald Duke, former governor of Cross River State
- Dan Archibong, former military governor of Cross River State
- Gershom Bassey, senator of the 8th and 9th National Assembly in Nigeria.
- Bassey Eyo Ephraim Adam III, former Obong of Calabar (1982-1986)
- Ekpo Okon Abasi Otu V, current Obong of Calabar (2008–present)
- Bassey Otu, current governor of Cross River State.
- Nkoyo Toyo, lawyer, development activist, and politician.
- Asuquo Ekpenyong, Nigerian politician and Financial analyst.

=== Sports ===
- Hogan Bassey, Nigerian-British Boxer.

== See also ==
- Efik religion
- Efik mythology
- Efik literature
- Efik calendar
- Efik name
- Nsibidi
- Ekpe
- Calabar
- Duke Town
- Creek Town

== Bibliography ==
- Kingsley, Mary (1899), West African Studies, London: Macmillan & Co. Ltd. OCLC 2652672
- Cotton, J.C. (1905). "The People of Old Calabar". Journal of the Royal African Society. 4 (15): 302–306. JSTOR 714561.
- Robertson, G.A. (1819), Notes on Africa, London: Sherwood, Neely and Jones, Paternoster Row OCLC 7957153
- Jeffreys, M.D.W. (1935), Old Calabar and notes on the Ibibio Language, Calabar: H.W.T.I. press
- Aye, Efiong U. (1967), Old Calabar through the centuries, Calabar: Hope Waddell Press OCLC 476222042
- Simmons, Donald C. (1958). Analysis of the Reflection of Culture in Efik folktales (PhD). Yale University.
- Mcfarlan, Donald (1957) [1st pub. 1946], Calabar, Edinburgh: Thomas Nelson and Sons Ltd.
- "Souvenir programme of the Coronation of Edidem Boco Ene Mkpang Cobham V", Scribd, Calabar: Glad tidings press ltd., 1990.
- Essien, Dominic (1993), Uruan people in Nigerian history, Uyo: Modern business press Ltd., ISBN 9782676217
- Aye, Efiong U. (2009), King Eyo Honesty II, Calabar, ISBN 978-978-8073-44-4
- Horton, James A.B. (1868), West African Countries and Peoples, London: W.J. Johnson, 121, Fleet street
- Williams, Gomer (1897), History of the Liverpool Privateers and Letters of Marque: with an Account of the Liverpool Slave Trade, London: William Heinemann; Edward Howell Church Street OCLC 557806739
- Simmons, Donald C. (1968) [1st pub. 1956], "An Ethnographic Sketch of the Efik people", in Forde, Daryll (ed.), Efik Traders of Old Calabar, London: Dawsons of Pall Mall OCLC 67514086
- Etifit, Edet Solomon (1979). Aspects of the Pre-Colonial History of Enwang in Oron Local Government Area (BA). University of Nigeria, Nsukka.
- Oku, Ekei Essien (1989), The Kings & Chiefs of Old Calabar (1785–1925), Calabar: Glad Tidings Press Ltd., ISBN 978-30541-0-4
- Goldie, Hugh (1862), Dictionary of the Efik Language, in two parts. I-Efik and English. II-English and Efik, Glassgow: Dunn and Wright
- Faraclas, Nicholas (1986). "Cross river as a model for the evolution of Benue-Congo nominal class/concord systems" (PDF). Studies in African Linguistics. 17 (1): 39–54. doi:10.32473/sal.v17i1.107495. S2CID 126381408. Archived from the original (PDF) on 26 March 2023.
- Ross, Alexander (1877). "Old Calabar". United Presbyterian Missionary Record. Edinburgh: William Oliphant. OCLC 5527608
- Watt, James (1903). "Notes on the Old Calabar district of Southern Nigeria". Royal Anthropological Institute of Great Britain and Ireland. 3: 103–105.
- Amaku, Ekpo Nta (1953), Edikot Ŋwed Mbuk, vol. 2, London: Thomas Nelson and Sons OCLC 990437200
- Aye, Efiong U. (2000), The Efik people, Calabar: Glad tidings press ltd., ISBN 978-30541-3-9
- Aye, Efiong U. (1991), A learner's dictionary of the Efik Language, Volume 1, Ibadan: Evans Brothers Ltd, ISBN 9781675276
- Baikie, William Baikie (1856), Narrative of an Exploring Voyage up the Rivers Kwora and Binue (Commonly known as the Niger and Tsadda) in 1854, London: John Murray, Albermale Street
- Forde, Daryll; Jones, G.I. (1957) [1st pub. 1950], The Ibo and Ibibio-speaking Peoples of South-Eastern Nigeria, London: International African Institute
- Ekereke, Okon; Ekereke, Mkpanam (1957), Historical sketches of Ibiaku Uruan, Lagos: The Ife-Olu Printing works
- Hart, A. Kalada (1964), Report of the Enquiry into the Dispute Over the Obongship of Calabar, Enugu: The Government Printer OCLC 32857131
- Williams, Gomer (1897), History of the Liverpool Privateers and Letters of Marque: with an Account of the Liverpool Slave Trade, London: William Heinemann; Edward Howell Church Street OCLC 557806739
- Great Britain. Parliament. Committee of the whole house, Abridgement of the minutes of the evidence,: taken before a Committee of the Whole House, to whom it was referred to consider of the slave-trade, 1789–1790, London OCLC 23603103
- Behrendt, Stephen D.; Graham, Eric J. (2003). "African Merchants, Notables and the Slave Trade at Old Calabar, 1720: Evidence from the National Archives of Scotland". History in Africa. 30: 37–61. doi:10.1017/S0361541300003132. JSTOR 3172081. S2CID 161919280.
- Latham, A.J.H. (1973), Old Calabar (1600–1891): The Impact of the International Economy upon a Traditional Society, Oxford: Clarendon Press, ISBN 978-0-19-821687-2
- Nair, Kannan K. (1972), Politics and Society in South Eastern Nigeria, 1841–1906: A Study of Power, Diplomacy and Commerce in Old Calabar, London: Frank Cass, ISBN 0-7146-2296-6
- Okon, Esien-Ekpe E. (1985), N̄kukun̄kpọyọriyọ, Ibadan: Evans bros., ISBN 9781674911 OCLC 21071129
- Talbot, Percy Amaury (1912), In the Shadow of the Bush, New York: George H. Doran Co.
- Waddell, Hope Masterton (1863), Twenty-Nine Years in the West Indies and Central Africa, London: Nelson & Sons OCLC 862147545
- Simmons, Donald C. (1958). Analysis of the Reflection of Culture in Efik folktales (PhD). Yale University.
- Hutchinson, Thomas J. (1858), Impressions of West Africa, London: Longman, Brown, Green, Longmans & Roberts OCLC 1046641528
