= Efik calendar =

Traditional calendar of the Efik people

The Efik calendar (Efik: Ñwed ọfiọñ Efịk) is the traditional calendar system of the Efik people located in present-day Nigeria. The calendar consisted of 8 days in a week (urua). Each day was dedicated to a god or goddess greatly revered in the Efik religion. It also consisted of festivals many of which were indefinite. Definite festivals were assigned on specific periods during the year while indefinite festivals or ceremonies occurred due to certain social or political circumstances.

== Days of the week ==
The names of the eight day week in the traditional Efik calendar include:-

- Akwa ederi
- Akwa eyibio
- Akwa ikwọ
- Akwa ọfiọñ
- Ekpri ederi
- Ekpri eyibio
- Ekpri ikwọ
- Ekpri ọfiọñ

Donald C. Simmons, an anthropologist who undertook several studies on the Efik society asserts that the presence of the adjectives, Akwa "big" and Ekpri "small" suggests that the Efik may have once possessed a four-day week. Each Efik day was of great importance in the religious life of the Efik. On Akwa ederi which was also known as Usen Ibet, day of rest, the Efik did not work but spent the day resting and feasting. Europeans also nicknamed Akwa ederi as "Calabar Sunday". The 8-day week had an adverse effect on the routine of European traders who often visited Old Calabar. Savage attests that the day was also dedicated to Eka ndem, the mother of Ndem. The Christian Sunday came to be known as Ederi due to the Christian prohibition of work on Sunday. It was common for families, houses and towns to have their separate deities. These communal deities were worshipped on Akwa eyibio. Akwa eyibio was originally known as Akwa ibibio but was later changed in 1967 by Chief Efiong Ukpong Aye. The use of Akwa ibibio has since become redundant. Akwa ikwọ was set aside for the display of the Ekpe masquerade (Idem Ekpe). On this day, women and non-Ekpe initiates were allowed to watch Ekpe displays. The last day of the Efik week was Akwa ọfiọñ. According to Savage, The national deity and patron of Nsibidi, Ekpenyong Obio Ndem was also worshipped on Akwa eyibio. Akwa ọfiọñ was also a day dedicated to grand Ekpe or Nyamkpe. On this day, slaves, women and non-Ekpe initiates were not allowed to watch the Ekpe display. Anyone who was prohibited from watching this display would usually not leave the door of their house open and would go through a bush path away from the ceremonies if they needed to undertake an errand.

== Festivals ==
The timing of Festivals in Efik society was mainly indefinite. Definite festivals occurred at particular periods in the year at Old Calabar. Among such festivals were Ndọk and Usukabia. Ndọk was a biennial purification ceremony that occurred sometime between November and December. Usukabia was the ceremony of first partaking of new yams in the year. The festival occurred at the beginning of the harvest season. Environmental factors were the main determinant for the setting of the time and day of these festivals. Indefinite ceremonies included Victory in war celebrations; purification carried out after war or illness; the coronation of an Edidem; the funeral rites of an edidem.

== See also ==
Ekpe

== Bibliography ==
- Savage, Olayinka Margaret (1985). The Efik Political System: The Effervescence of Traditional Offices (PhD). University of Manchester.
- Aye, Efiong U. (1967), Old Calabar through the centuries, Calabar: Hope Waddell Press OCLC 476222042
- Simmons, Donald C. (1958). Analysis of the Reflection of Culture in Efik folktales (PhD). Yale University.
- Amaku, Ekpo Nta (1948), Edikot Ŋwed Mbuk 1, London: Thomas Nelson and Sons OCLC 990437200
- Waddell, Hope Masterton (1863), Twenty-Nine Years in the West Indies and Central Africa, London: Nelson & Sons OCLC 862147545
- Aye, Efiong U. (1991), A learner's dictionary of the Efik Language, Volume 1, Ibadan: Evans Brothers Ltd, ISBN 9781675276
- Cotton, J.C. (1905). "The People of Old Calabar". Journal of the Royal African Society. 4 (15): 302–306. JSTOR 714561.
