= Efik name =

Indigenous names of the Efik people

Efik names are names borne by the Efik people of Southern Nigeria and Western Cameroon. The naming system of the Efik is unique and differs from contemporary African names in several ways. The word for name in Efik is Enyiñ and the act of assigning a name to a child is Usio enyiñ.

Like many cultures, the naming of an Efik child takes place at a naming ceremony. Unlike many Nigerian names, most Efik names do not possess literal meanings but store information about a child. Such information may include the circumstances of the child's birth, the day or time the child was born and the family the child comes from. The lack of literal meaning in many Efik names is because the practice of assigning literal sentences as names to children was rare. In modern times, The most common practice among the Efik is to assign a child the name of an ancestor or a parent. Every Efik child has at least four different names which include birth names (enyiñ emana), given names (ata enyiñ/usio enyiñ), nicknames (udori enyiñ or nditik enyiñ) and honorific or pet names (enyiñ uko or enyiñ akparawa). So important was the act of naming a child that every individual in the average Efik family or house was expected to be able to recite their seven ancestral names in an exercise known as Utịñ emana, (Declaration of Ancestry).

== Birth name ==
Birth names known in Efik as Enyiñ Emana are assigned according to the circumstances surrounding the birth of the individual. Originally, birth names were used alongside real names but over the centuries, birth names have also been used as real names. Birth names can depict the day an individual was born. The Efik originally had an 8-day week system. Among the days of the Efik week include, Akwa Ikwọ, Akwa Ederi, Akwa Eyibio, Akwa Ọfiọñ, Ekpri Ikwọ, Ekpri Ederi, Ekpri Eyibio and Ekpri Ọfiọñ.

Days of the week	Name (Male)	Name (Female)
Akwa Ikwọ	Asukwọ	Ikwọ
Ekpri Ikwọ	Asukwọ	Ikwọ
Akwa Ederi	Edet	Arit
Ekpri Ederi	Edet	Arit
Akwa Eyibio	Etim	Atim
Ekpri Eyibio	Etim	Atim
Akwa Ọfiọñ	Efiọñ	Afiọñ
Ekpri Ọfiọñ	Efiọñ	Afiọñ

Week-day names are also common in other West African ethnic groups such as the Akan, Hausa, Igbo and several others. Children may also be assigned names according to the time of the day of which they were born. For example, a male child born at night is named Okon and a female child born at night is named Nko or Nkoyo. Mensah attests that sometimes the name Okonanwan is assigned to a child born as Night. Birth names were used to recall the period that events occurred in a family. Birth-names can also depict the position of a child in a family. However, names which depict the position of a child are never regarded as real names or used in formal settings among the Efik. These formal settings include school enrollment or any other public records. These names are also never expected to be mentioned when the exercise known as Utịñ Emana was carried out. Among these names include:

Rank	Male	Female
1st born child	Akpan	Adiaha
2nd born child	Udọ	Udunwan
3rd born child	Udọudọ	Udunwanudunwan

== Real name ==
Real names in Efik are known as Ata enyịñ or Usio enyịñ. These names are often ancestral names and can be used to identify true Efik indigenes. Although the most popular custom is to assign a child the name of a person in his family tree, real names were originally influenced by factors such as the natural environment and traditional religion.

=== Names influenced by Natural Environment ===
The Efik people were primarily fishermen and as such, their daily activities mainly revolved around water bodies. Water bodies such as rivers, streams, and seas were sometimes instrumental in the naming of a child. Among such names included Inyañ, Idim, Esuk and Eme.

=== Names influenced by Efik Trado-Religion and beliefs ===
The Efik traditional religion and beliefs are also factors which play a role in the Efik naming system. Names of deities were assigned to children for numerous reasons. Among these deities included Abasi, Ekpenyong, Ekanem, Anansa, Anantigha and several others. It was believed that these deities watched over those who bore these names and ensured no harm came to them. The name Ndem which translates of Marine deities was originally assigned to children who were born via the intercession of the parents to the Ndem. Names such as Nyoñ reflect the belief in reincarnation among the Efik. Originally, A mother whose child dies names her next child Nyoñ as it is believed the new child is a reincarnation of the former. Several factors were influential in the assigning of names of animals to Children. One of such factors is the belief in Ukpọñ Ikọt (Bush soul). Although it is very easy to assume the child's name possesses a simple literal interpretation, qualities admired in certain animals was one of the reasons the name of the animal was assigned to the child. For example, the Efik cow (Enañ Efịk) is considered a sacred animal among the Efik and symbolises purity. This species of cows, known as the friesian pygmy cows, are very rare and are rarely milked their cows or eaten. Children were sometimes named after great creatures such as Ekpe (Lion), Anwa (Cat), Omon (Gorilla), Eso (Water chevrotain), Enang (Cow) and Usari (Kingfisher).

Animal	English	Efik name
Ekpe	Lion	Ekpe
Añwa	Cat	Anwa
Ọmọn	Gorilla	Omon
Esọ	Water chevrotain	Esọ
Usari	Kingfisher	Asari
Fiom	Crocodile	Efiom
Enang	Cow	Enañ

Children were also assigned the names of heavenly bodies. Among these heavenly bodies include Orok Abasi (Moon ring), Eyo (Sun rays), Anwa Obo (Jupiter), Offiong (Moon), Ntan-nta ọffiọñ (Stars).

Heavenly body	English	Efik name
Ọrọk Abasi	Moon ring	Ọrọk
Eyo	Sunshine	Eyo
Anwa obo	Jupiter	Obo
Ọffiọñ	Moon	Offiong
Ntan-nta Ọffiọñ	Star	Ntan (Antan) or Nta

==== Philosophy ====
The average Nigerian indigenous name is a combination of words of gratitude, reverence, praise and belief in a supreme being or a traditional deity. The name of the supreme being in many Nigerian Languages would include Oluwa, Olisa, Aondoo, Chukwu, Osa/Osanobua etc The outcome of the different names of God in the various ethnicities together with a string of words give rise to names such as: Adeosun - Crown of Osun; Anuoluwapo - God mercies are abundant; Tamarapreye - God's gift; Osayoghoghówemwén - God has endowed me with joy; Kamdilichukwu - Let me live for God; Onyedikachukwu - Who is like God etc. In some cases, the average Nigerian name may reference other deities such as Osimiri, Ala, Kamalu etc. Despite the pantheon of deities found in the traditional religion of various Nigerian ethnicities, they do not assign the names of deities to children. One rarely hears a Nigerian of non-Efik descent bear names such as Olokun, Ogun, Osun, Ala, Ikenga, Amadioha, Oto, Egbesu etc. In the case of the Efik, several names infer a personal relationship with the supreme being or deities and skip the protocol found in the average Nigerian name. The Efik who worship Abasi and in former times, a pantheon of deities such as Ekpenyọñ, Ekanem, Obo Iwomen, Anansa, Ewa Okon, Eka Asari, have never had a problem assigning the names of deities to children. An Efik child bears Abasi, the name of the supreme being. Efik children also bear names of deities or sacred objects of reverence e.g Ekpenyọñ, Ekanem, Inyañ, Adịm, Ndem, Ibitam and Inima. This has been the case for centuries. Among the Efik of Iboku, the early ancestors bore names with spiritual symbolism i.e Oku (Priest), Ukpong (Soul), Adim (derived from Ibiadịm, the Ndem wand).

=== Names influenced via kinship and blood ties ===
Names can also be introduced into a family via marriage. Parents may wish to assign the name of the child's maternal grandmother who may be non-Efik to the child. Such intermarriages have given rise to several new names in a family tree. A notable example is the Efik name Umo which is common among the people of Duke town. The name Umo was introduced among the Duke town families through the union between Ekpo Efiom Okoho and Umo Efembe Umo Eren (An Uruan princess). Originally, the name Umo was given to children born when a family relative is undergoing their coming of age ceremony (Inam).

=== Names recognising notable figures ===
It was not uncommon for children to be named after notable Efik figures. Some of these notable figures include Eyoma (derived from Eyọ Ema - the Edidem of the Efik), Edem-Ekpenyong - the 5th Iyamba of Ekpe Efik Iboku, Esien Ekpe - the first Iyamba of Ekpe Efik Iboku, Eneyọ (derived from Ene Eyọ - a son of Eyọ Ema Atai) and Efiom Okoho - One of the patriarchs of Duke town. The latter was the name of King Archibong I, a direct descendant of Efiom Okoho.

== Honorific names ==
Honorific names also known as Enyiñ uko are names given to people by friends and mates in recognition of a person's character or prowess. These names are regarded as a mark of respect and sometimes describe the status of the bearer in society. Examples of such names include:

- Owot uko - Full version: Owot uko atua usen nnanenyin (He that kills the brave cries at the visit of adversity).
- Ọkpọ ọsọñ - Full version:Ọkpọ ọsọñ akan ukwak (The bone that is stronger than an iron).
- Eto nkukim - Full version: Eto nkukim inuen isọrọke (Birds don't perch on trees with spikes).
- Ikọ ọsọñ - Full version: Ikọ ọsọñ, okpoho onuk (No matter the seriousness of the case, money can solve it).
- Akañkañ - Full version: Eñwan ọsọñ ekot ikpamfum, ọsọñ akaha ekot akañkañ (When the battle is hard, they summon ikpamfum, if harder, they summon akañkañ).
- Ukemeke aka - Full version: Ukemeke aka, ka ise! (You don't have the capacity to perform a task but you want to go and fail trying it!).
- Oyom ñkpa - Full version: Oyom ñkpa otuk enañ isim (He that wants to die touches the tail of a cow).
- Ebibene - Full version: Ebibene ọsọñ, enañ eberi edem (If the wall is strong, the cow leans on it).
- Eto akan eto - The tree stronger than a tree.
- Ikpamfum - Full version: Eñwan ọsọñ ekot ikpamfum (When the battle is hard, they summon ikpamfum).
- Itiaba - The number seven which is regarded as a formidable number.
- Ofum ọsọñ - Lit. Strong wind.
- Isim ayara Ekpe - Lit. The tail of the male leopard.
- Ekikak - The industry.
- Otia etiti

== Pet names ==
Pet names also known as Enyiñ akparawa are usually given to a youthful person whose attributes are considered intriguing. These names communicate the bearers personal attributes and natural abilities. Such names may describe attributes such as a person's talent at singing, enormous wealth, fashion sense and beauty. Examples include:

- Ñkoñ - Full version: Ñkoñ enem uyo nkan ekọmọ (The gong that has a more beautiful sound than the drum).
- Ntokon - Full version: Ntokon eye iso ndiọk edu (The pepper that looks physically appealing but can be hot-tempered).
- Ekpri abiabon - Full version: Ekpri abiabon ekim akwa ọfọñ (The little needle that sews a big dress).
- Ifọt itaha - Full version: Ifọt itaha eyen-eka ọsọñ mbañ (Witches cannot attack a sibling of the outspoken).
- Ekebe - Full version: Ekebe okpo owo eye ke mbana (The coffin that carries the corpse can look appealing if well decorated).
- Efiom Efiom enyene ñkpọ - Full version: Efiom Efiom enyene ñkpö, owo efen inyeneke ñkpö nte Efiom enyenede (It is only Efiom that has great wealth, no other person's wealth can measure to his).
- Inem ñkpọ - Full version: Inem ñkpö oduñ usuñ uyom (A delightful thing is not easily accessible).
- Ikọñ eye k'enyọñ - Full version: Iköñ eye k'enyöñ, esim isöñ akabade ndek ("The leaf is beautiful when still on the tree but when it falls on the ground, it turns to dirt).

== Nicknames ==
Nicknames also known as Udori Enyịñ or Nditịk Enyịñ are names given to the bearer by loved ones and close family relatives. These are names of endearment which may also communicate the circumstances of the bearer's birth or their position in the family. These names are never used in formal settings. Among these nicknames include:

- Adiaha-Akpan - This is given to the first daughter of a father who is the first son among his siblings.
- Akpakpan - This is given to the first son of a father who is also the first son among his siblings.
- Akpan-udọ - This is given to the first son of a father who is the second son among his siblings.
- Adiaha-udọ - This is given to the first daughter of father who is the second son among his siblings.
- Akpan-adiaha - This is given to the first son of a mother who is the first daughter in among her siblings.
- Akpan-odunwan - This is given to the first son of a mother who is the second daughter.
- Koko-ete - This is given to a male child who bears the same name with the father.
- Koko-eka/Koko-mma - This is given to a female child who bears the same name with her mother.
- Koko-nne - This is given to a female child who bears her grandmother's name.

Other nicknames which reflect endearment and respect in the family include:

- Ufan-ete - Father's friend
- Ufan-eka - Mother's friend
- Etinyịn - Our father (reserved for male children)
- Ekanyịn - Our mother (reserved for female children)
- Etete - Paternal grandfather
- Etema - Maternal grandfather
- Eka-ete - Paternal grandfather
- Eka-eka - Maternal grandmother
- Etebọñ - Father of a king (reserved from female children)
- Ekabọñ /Mmabọñ - Mother of a king (reserved for female children)
- Etekamba - Big father (reserved from female children)
- Mmakamba - Big mother -
- Nne/Nne-nne/Ete-nne - Grandmother/Great grandmother/Grandmother's father usually given respectively to a son or daughter in memory of their grandparents.

There are also nicknames derived from the child's real name. Some of these include:

- Akpama or Eskọr from Asukwọ
- Ayib from Efiom
- Ebak from Otu
- Eddy from Edet
- Ika from Akabom
- Eka-Ekpo or Nkee from Nkese
- Eti from Etim
- Efi from Efiong
- Iyam from Eyamba
- Nkim from Effanga
- Nneneñ from Ekanem
- Odusu for Ekpenyong.

== Double barrel names and numbers ==
When children were named after certain ancestors whom they are descended from, it was common to show the repetition of the name in the person's ancestry using a number or Double-barrelled name. A child who was the third person to answer the name Bassey in his family tree would be called, "Ita Bassey". ita is the efik translation of three. The number "Inang" may also be found in some names to depict that the child is the fourth person to answer a name. When the child is the second person to answer a name, the number "Iba" (two) is not used but rather, the structure of the name changes. Some examples include.

- Okokon - Given to a child who is the second in his ancestry to bear the name, Okon.
- Etetim - Given to a child who is the second in his ancestry to bear the name, Etim.
- Ededem - Given to a child who is the second in his ancestry to bear the name, Edem.
- Efefiom - Given to a child who is the second in his ancestry to bear the name, Efiom.
- Efefiong - Given to a child who is the second in his ancestry to bear the name, Efiong.
- Eyeyo - Given to a child who is the second in his ancestry to bear the name, Eyo.
- Ededet - Given to a child who is the second in his ancestry to bear the name, Edet.
- Essessien/Esesien - Given to a child who is the second in his ancestry to bear the name, Esien or Essien.

The primary name from which the new compound names are generated, is usually the name of the father of a child. For example, the information which reflects in the name of a child with the name Okokon Okon shows that the child is Okokon, the son of Okon. These compound names are not applicable to all Efik names but are only applicable to a few. In cases where such compound structure does not exist for a name, the name is simply repeated. For example, a child whose father's name is otu and who is the second in his ancestry to bear the name would be called Otu Otu. The same would be applicable to names such as Itam, Ekpenyong, Ukorebi which would be as follows:- Itam Itam, Ekpenyong Ekpenyong, Ukorebi Ukorebi.

== Gender-Specific names ==
Most Efik names are unisex. However, it is common for names specific to men to be adapted for women as well. Efik names for men can often be adapted for women by introducing the suffix -Añwan. A father with the name Eyọ may choose to give his child the name Eyoañwan to show the strong bond between father and daughter. Other examples include

Male name	female variant
Essien	Essienañwan
Abasi	Abasi-Añwan
Ekpenyọñ	Ekpenyọñañwan
Ene	Eneañwan
Efiom	Efioañwan
Edem	Edemañwan
Ekpo	Ekpoañwan
Asibọñ	Asibọñañwan

== External influences ==
=== Anglicization of names ===
During the era of the triangular trade, a practice of taking up western styled names became common among the Efik. Certain Efik names were anglicised. Among these include:

Efik name	English name
Nsa	Henshaw
Efiom	Ephraim
Edem	Adam
Akabom	Cobham
Asibọñ	Archibong
Etim	Tom
Ọkọhọ	Ọkọr
Otu	Otto
Abasi	Bassey
Ndem	Andem
Ene	Henry
Oboko	Boco
Ekpenyọñ	Young

=== Christian influence of Efik names ===
Although many Efik took up trading names during the era of the slave trade, they did not bear these trading names from birth. Many of such trading names were Christian names while some were of European origin. The bearing of western-styled names and christian names as personal birth names arose a number of years after the infiltration of Christianity in Efik society. On being baptised into the christian faith, many Efik assumed christian names. As a result, a number of typical name combinations can be found such as Elijah Henshaw, William Duke, Emmanuel Archibong. Similar cases can also be found among islamic-practicing Efik where names such as Suleiman, Adamu and Mohammed may be found.

== List of Efik Names ==
List of Efik names

#	Efik name		#	Efik name		#	Efik name
1	Atai		51	Osukpọng		101	Ani
2	Ema		52	Oboyo		102	Eniang
3	Ekpe		53	Atu		103	Edak
4	Odo		54	Aya		104	Ene
5	Efiom		55	Nta		105	Mkpang
6	Ekpo		56	Efa		106	Asibọng
7	Ukpọng		57	Otu		107	Iya
8	Inyang		58	Ọkọhọ		108	Oboko
9	Oku		59	Ekpenyọng		109	Eke	Ekei
10	Adim		60	Erete		110	Ankọt	Nkọt
11	Abia		61	Asari		111	Ansa
12	Abasi		62	Mba		112	Esọ
13	Ọsọ		63	Edem		113	Esien	Esin
14	Umọ		64	Nkese		114	Akabom
15	Ekpa		65	Uta		115	Antan	Ntan
16	Amaku		66	Ewa		116	Asandia
17	Amayọ		67	Ekeng		117	Uyi
18	Asa		68	Ikpeme		118	Aye
19	Ibọk		69	Enang		119	Etọn
20	Asanaya		70	Uduak		120	Ntiero
21	Ukorebi		71	Adoka		121	Aruk
22	Efanga		72	Ambo		122	Eyibio
23	Eburu		73	Ate		123	Obo
24	Amika		74	Obori		124	Abọk
25	Nda	Anda	75	Okpoto		125	Ekanem
26	Asama		76	Ama		126	Obuma
27	Ibitam		77	Tete		127	Esekun
28	Inima		78	Awo		128	Mesembe
29	Asiya		79	Ebi		129	Enọ
30	Mbusa		80	Mbika		130	Abatim
31	Ekpiken		81	Awa		131	Minika
32	Edung		82	Abo		132	Nyok
33	Akwa		83	Onoyom		133	Anyando
34	Inọk		84	Asido		134	Anwatim
35	Nkọrọ		85	Ndaw		135	Ena
36	Awiri		86	Anwakang		136	Anwanda
37	Mbọkwọ		87	Uyi		137	Uyu
38	Utọng		88	Utang		138	Esemin
39	Esu		89	Ating	Anating	139	Efiọk
40	Ntekim		90	Amboni		140	Aduna
41	Anwafiọng		91	Ebita		141	Ebiti
42	Mbang		92	Nya		142	Abin
43	Ukwọ		93	Ankọi		143	Owen
44	Amukwa		94	Ọyọ		144	Esọhọ
45	Itam		95	Ana		145	Idang
46	Etia		96	Idem		146	Nyomo
47	Ndiyo		97	Atimba		147	Ebetim
48	Antai		98	Ukpa		148	Iwatt
49	Onono		99	Edisua		149	Awatt
50	Ayira		100	Mbọnki		150	Anyin

== Bibliography ==
- Jeffreys, M.D.W. (1935), Old Calabar and notes on the Ibibio Language, Calabar: H.W.T.I. press
- Mensah, Eyo (2021). "The Englishisation of personal names in Nigeria: What Englishisation of Efik and Ibibio personal names suggests about English in Nigeria". English Today: 1–13. doi:10.1017/S026607842100016X. S2CID 235827982.
- Mensah, Eyo (2015). "Personal names in language contact situations: A case of Cross River State, Southeastern Nigeria". Acta Academica. 2 (47): 102–138.
- Amaku, Ekpo Nta (1948), Edikot Ŋwed Mbuk 1, London: Thomas Nelson and Sons OCLC 990437200
- Simmons, Donald C. (1960). "Sexual life, Marriage and Childhood among the Efik". Journal of the International African Institute. 30 (2): 153–165. doi:10.2307/1157710. JSTOR 1157710. S2CID 144037920.
- Nair, Kannan K. (1972), Politics and Society in South Eastern Nigeria, 1841–1906: A Study of Power, Diplomacy and Commerce in Old Calabar, London: Frank Cass, ISBN 0-7146-2296-6
- Simmons, Donald C. (1958). Analysis of the Reflection of Culture in Efik folktales (PhD). Yale University.
- Akak, Eyo Okon (1982), Efiks of Old Calabar: Culture and Superstitions, vol. III, Calabar: Akak & Sons OCLC 773255520
- Duke, Orok Orok Effiom (2018), A Great Prince among Eminent Princes of Calabar, Calabar: Alpha Graphix Printing Press, ISBN 978-978-051-806-6
- Goldie, Hugh (1862), Dictionary of the Efik Language, in two parts. I-Efik and English. II-English and Efik, Glassgow: Dunn and Wright
