= Efik religion =

Traditional religion of the Efik people of Nigeria

The Efik religion is based on the traditional beliefs of the Efik people of southern Nigeria. The traditional religious beliefs of the Efik are not systemised into a logical orthodoxy but consists of diverse conceptions such as worship of the supreme God, ancestral veneration, cleansing rituals and funeral rites.

Religion for the Efik consisted of showing respect for God by avoiding sins such as adultery, murder, theft, false witness, and work on the day sacred to God. In addition, it included respect for ancestors and supernatural powers. The Efik people believe in a supreme being known as Abasi or Abasi Ibom. Other variations of the name Abasi may also be found across the lower Cross River region such as Obase, Ovase and Obassi Nsi. Apart from the belief in a supreme being, the Efik also believe in water spirits or deities known as Ndem which are believed to mainly reside in the water. The singular of Ndem is Idem but Ndem may be worshipped as a single deity or a host of deities.

== Worship of Abasi ==
The Efik people believe in one God known as Abasi who is believed to dwell in the sky and is the source of life and death. Abasi is also known as Abasi Ibom where the appended word "Ibom" signifies greatness. Writers such as James Walker and Rev. Hugh Goldie attest that the word "Ibom" is only ever applied to two objects i.e. the Sea (Inyañ) and Abasi. During the pre-Christian days of the Efik society, Worship of Abasi took place on Akwa Ederi which was one of the days of the week. According to Simmons, "No washing of clothes, marketing, fishing, hunting, or drumming was permitted on Akwa ederi, the day of the eight-day week sacred to God, People remained inside the house and rested, or feasted and visited friends* Efik never commenced a war or fought a battle on "Calabar Sunday" as the day was known to early European traders." Abasi was worshipped in front of Isu Abasi which is described as, "a little mud hut has an altar in the middle of the yard in which plates, bones, etc, are placed."

== Ndem worship ==
The Efik affirm a strong belief in Ndem which are believed to rule various territories in old Calabar. Ndem is believed to reside in various water bodies such as streams, creeks and rivers. The belief in water deities is mainly as a result of the geographical location of the Efik in subsaharan Africa. According to Aye,

Prior to the advent of Christianity in Old Calabar in the nineteenth century the Efik people were polytheists by religion, that is to say, they worshipped several gods and goddesses to whom they offered periodic animal and human sacrifices. For instance, Creek Town had worshipped Akpa Uyɔk; Old Town, Anansa Ikọt Obutong; Cobham Town, Iboku Anwan; Henshaw Town, Esiet Ebom Nsidung or Suŋku Moŋko: but these were by no means all, and individual families and Houses had their patron gods and goddesses.

The college of deities were collectively known as Ndem Efik (Efik: Ndem Efịk)). Ndem Efik is believed to reward its adherents with wealth, children and good fortune. Children who were born as result of consultation with Ndem Efik are known as Nditọ Ndem and are often given the name "Ndem". According to Akak, "Women who become spiritualits with deep knowledge in the mystery of spiritualism are also known as "Iban Ndem,"women of the deity. Men who fall within this category are known as Iren Ndem and both male and female worshippers of the Deity are "Mbon Ndem," people of the Deity." The various Ndem often have priests and priestesses who sacrifice to them. Ndem Priests and Priestesses are known as Awa Ndem. The chief priest or priestess is known as Oku Ndem. Among the Efik of Iboku, Ndem worship is often associated with the Eyọ Ema clan which includes Otung in Creek Town and Cobham town.

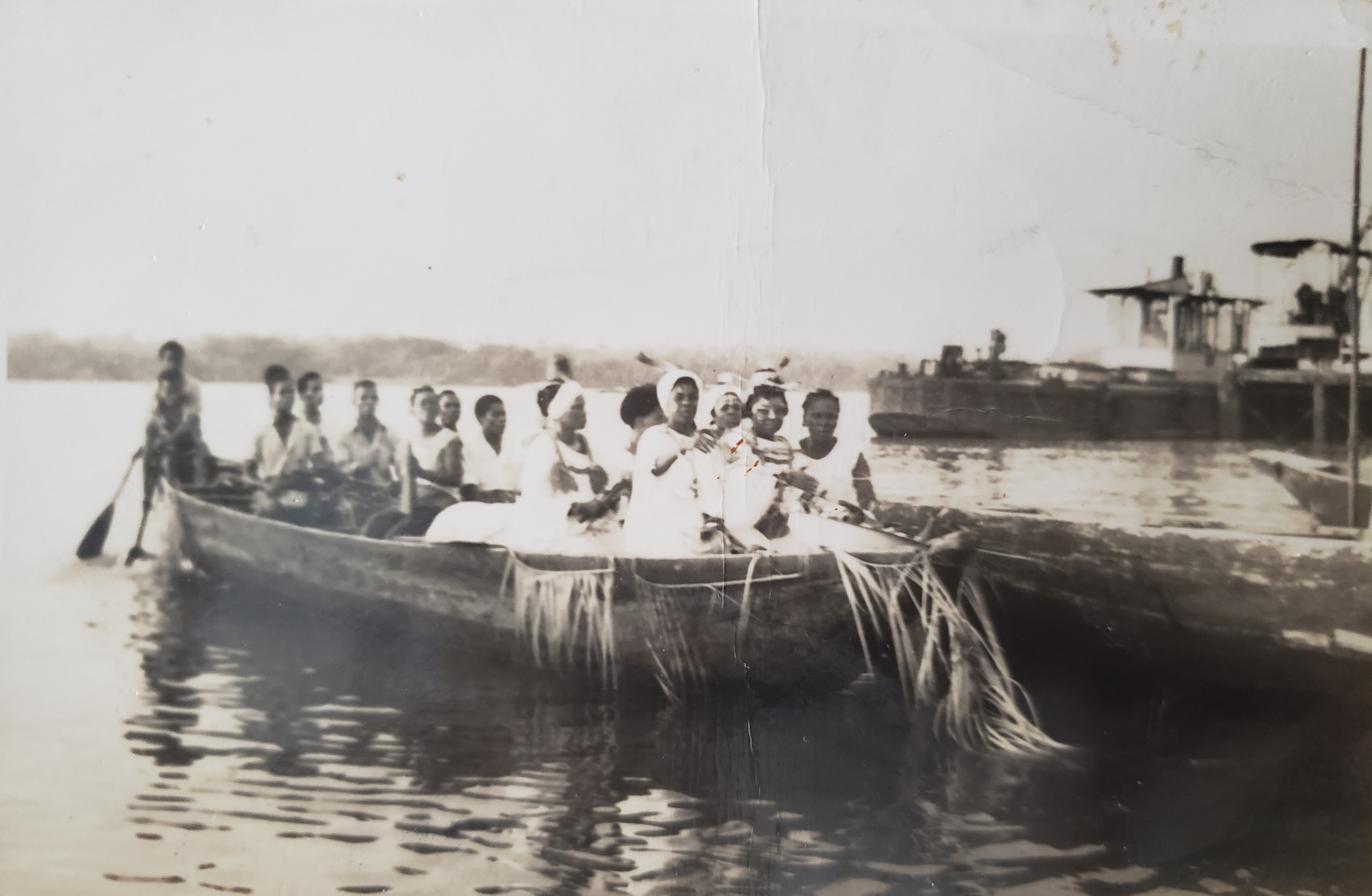
Iban Ndem

A place where prayer and offerings are made to Ndem is known as Iso Ndem. Iso Ndem is believed to be an area where a deity is supposed to dwell. Such an area may exist on land, forest or water. Offerings or sacrifices to Ndem are usually made in a specially woven basket known as (Efik: Ekete). Contents of the basket usually include oil palm fruit, an oil palm kernel, pieces of plantain, pieces of mashed yam, and a species of small croaker. The various Ndem have unique objects which complement offerings made to them. According to Savage, "For Anansa Ikot Obutong a pipe must be included in the sacrifice, for Afia añwan (fair lady) there must be a piece of white cloth." A sacrifice to Asari Anyando included a goat, chicken, eggs, wine and white, yellow and red chalk. Other sacrificial items included Eggs, white fowl, white goats, cows, tortoises. During the pre-colonial era, Human sacrifices were sometimes made to the Ndem but this practice gradually declined with the entry of the Christian missionaries.

== Festivals and Ceremonies ==
In the Efik traditional religion, it was believed that unless the land is purified, misfortune will descend on the people. Thus, the Efik employed several cleansing rituals to appease their Ancestors and bring blessings on the land. In some cases where a person feared misfortune surrounded his home or wished to bring God's blessings on his home, some symbolic acts would be carried out to purify his home and attract God's blessings on his family.

=== Ndọk ===
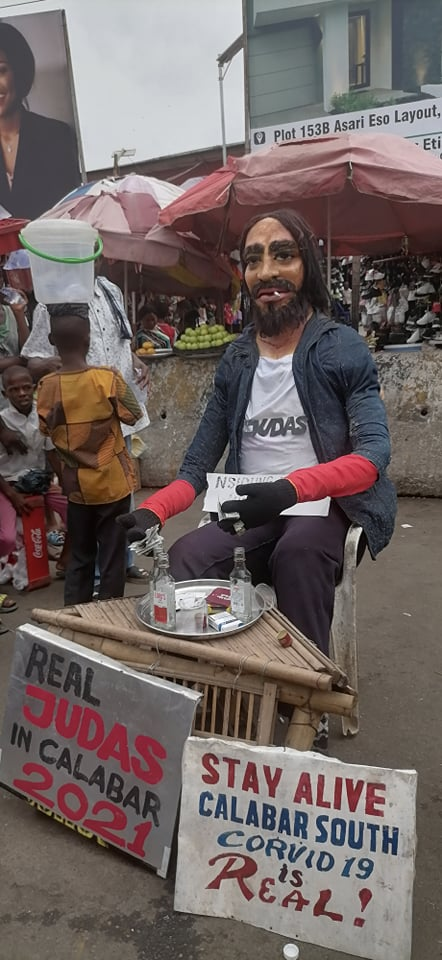
In Calabar, people make caricatures of Judas and flog the caricatures on Good Friday at noon

Ndọk was a biennial purgation festival which was held around December. The purpose of the festival was to drive away evil spirits from the Efik country. Prior to the day of the festival, rude images known as Nabikim were set up before the doors of several houses. Nabikim were created in the image of animals such as Cows, Elephants, Tigers, Alligators and other animals. These caricatures were constructed with sticks and grass-covered with cloth. Consul Hutchinson describes them stating,

These figures are made of sticks and bamboo matting; being moulded into different shapes. Some of them have an attempt at body, with legs and arms, to resemble the human form. Imaginative artists sometimes furnish these specimens with an old straw hat, a pipe in the mouth, and a stick fastened to the end of the arm, as if they were prepared to undertake a journey. Many of the figures are supposed to resemble four-footed animals; some crocodiles; and other birds.

The evil spirits are expected to inhabit the Nabikim prior to the festival. On the Night of the festival, a lot of Noise is made. Cannons are fired, drums are beaten, bells are rung. The noise was expected to frighten the devil and evil spirits with the intention of chasing them out of town. By morning, the Nabikim were thrown away into the river. According to Hope Waddell, "There were sometimes real outbursts of grief on these occasions; on the remembrance of departed relatives, thus finally expelled heart-breaking passionate bewailings." The Ndọk festival later metamorphosed into a celebration of the New Year's Eve Ubin Usua but the Nabikim is not made for this celebration. Nabikim effigies are made for mbre judas (Judas play) which holds on Good Friday. On Good Friday, young people put these Nabikim effigies on the streets and at noon, they begin to beat the effigies with sticks, shouting "Judas killed Christ".

=== Ankọ Ebekpa ===
This was a cleansing ritual usually performed after War to avert catastrophe. This ritual was performed by the Ankọ society which was composed of men. The ritual was performed due to the amount of blood spilt and different war medicines (Efik: Ibọk Ekọñ) utilised such as Ibọk ata, Ukpup and Itop. Witchcraft prevention charms were also employed such as Okpata, Nyom-Itim and Ekpinọn. War medicines were regarded as polluting the spiritual energy of the land. The cleansing exercise was therefore done to counteract their effects on the land. The dance was performed at mid-night. During the performance, non-members of the society were to remain indoors.

The ritual was also used to cleanse the town should death occur through Mbiam. In a situation where a person dies from dropsy, tuberculosis or elephantiasis, the burial of the person is supervised by the Ankọ society and the corpse is rolled in a mat and buried at midnight. If a mother died during pregnancy or childbirth without the fetus removed, the society would equally supervise her burial. After the burial, the society would return to the community with its ceremonial items to the compound of the deceased where they would beat drums, sing and carry the cleansing instruments into all the rooms. They would equally sprinkle protective medicine in all the rooms after cutting a hole in the roof of the house to serve as an exit for evil things. Any food or water in the home of a person during the ritual is disposed and thrown away. The Efik believe the ritual to be so powerful that should a non-initiate watch the ritual take place, they would sicken and die. As a result, a father initiates his young son into the society to prevent any danger.

=== Ekpa ===
This is a private and mysterious dance performed only by elderly women before the Obong's coronation ceremony. The purpose of the dance was to cleanse the society of evil, diseases and ensure peace and fertility. It is performed in the nude at night away from prying eyes. The performance solely by older women stems from the old belief that elderly women who were past menopause were considered asexual in Efik traditional society.

== Religious Practices ==
=== Libation ===
Among the Efik, every social function of great moment anywhere on the territory of a particular people, calls for the offering to and supplication of the ancestors. The function could be a wedding coming of age, naming ceremony, celebration of any sort of one's elevation, a welcome or send-off ceremony and so on. It could also be a function at the village, town, governmental, school, club, society or even Church level. It is the duty of the oldest man in the gathering and he must be dressed in the traditional attire of the Efik, which is a loincloth wrapped around the hips flowing to the ground, with a shirt on top. Were the said man to be dressed otherwise, he would have to indigenize that attire by sticking out a piece of cloth or handkerchief in front of the trousers. This would make up for the loincloth. The drink used in the past to pour libation was the Palm wine (Efik: Mmịn Efịk).

=== Prayers ===
Prayers are often made to God, Ancestors or Supernatural powers. Richard Burton likened the method of prayer used by the Efik as being similar to that of the Pharisees. Although prayers may sometimes be addressed to magical powers such as Ibọk and Mbiam, the Efik normally cajole persuade or argue rather than pray to them. A person may pray by himself or as a speaker in a group. When a group prays, one person says the prayer while the others remain silent. Prayers often go along with the pouring of libation or with the making of a sacrifice such as the killing of a goat or a chicken.

=== Sacrifices ===
Sacrifice is an important aspect of Efik religious beliefs. Examples of sacrifice include food, animal sacrifice and human sacrifice. The latter became obsolete with the entry of the Christian missionaries, the 1878 treaty abolishing human sacrifices and the promulgation of laws by the Ekpe society. Apart from other types of sacrifices, Ndem may be offered special types of food as a sacrifice. One of such special meals was Iwewe. Iwewe consists of boiled yam mashed with a small amount of palm oil and stirred with a spoon. Animals such as goats, chicken, cows and rams may be killed and offered as a sacrifice. White animals are especially valued during sacrifice such as white goats, white chicken, white cow. Human sacrifices were common but were not so frequent. The Efik of Iboku formerly sacrificed an Albino girl on Parrot Island to the deity Udom inyañ when a need arose. According to Consul Hutchinson,

A curious superstition is connected with Parrot Island and is observed with religious punctuality by the natives of Old Kalabar, on the occasion of need arising for its performance. Whenever a scarcity of European trading ships exists, or is apprehended, the Duke town authorities are accustomed to take an Albino child of their own race and offer it up as a sacrifice at Parrot Island, to the God of the white man. This they do because the island is in view of the sea,..over which the God of the nations that sent them articles of European manufacture is supposed to preside, The last sacrifice of this kind was made within the past year; and every one must regret that the increasing trade of the country, together with the teachings of the missionaries and supercargoes, has not put an end to this brutality.

== Priesthood ==
Ndem had several adherents loyal to them and equally had priests responsible for sacrificing to them. The chief priest who sits above the college of priests is known as the Edidem. The Edidem was in charge of Ndem Efik (College of Efik deities). The stool of the Edidem originally wielded a combination of priestly and political power and was the prerogative of the descendants of Atai Iboku. The last king to have wielded such power was Eyọ Ema who lived around the 15th century. While the Efik of Iboku lived at Creek Town, Eyọ Ema handed over the political duties of the stool to Efiom Ekpo and took up the priestly duties thereby becoming solely the Oku Ndem Efik (Priest of the college of Efik deities). When the Efik clans separated and moved to their various settlements, the Oku Ndem Efik was still regarded in several texts as "King Calabar" or "King of Calabar". Prior to the abolition of slavery, The Efik greeted the Edidem with the salutation "Etia ke isọñ" while persons of slave descent would place "the side of the index fingers in juxtaposition, and bowing humbly as evidence of obeisance." The Oku Ndem Efik would offer up a weekly sacrifice to the Ndem which may consist of goats, fowls and tortoises. When famine was impending or there was a dearth of ships at Old Calabar, the Chief priest would send out word on the need to make sacrifices to change their fortune for the better. According to Hackett, "The priesthood had lost much of its influence by 1805 although it still retained a judicial role as late as the 1850s". By 1970, there was a revitalisation of the stool of the Edidem with the 1971 Udoh's report.

== Funeral ceremonies ==
Since the earliest period of Efik settlement in Calabar and up to the mid-nineteenth century, The Efik were renowned for their elaborate funeral ceremonies. The Efik believed that when a great man or woman dies, they should not go alone into the afterlife. Thus, nobles and kings were buried along with their personal objects as well as with their slaves and wives. Rev. Hope Waddell who quotes an "aged old man" states, "If you have no one with you,” said an aged gentleman to a young one, who heard the word of God, “if you have no one with you when you die, Ekpo country will say, what poor slave is that coming now; he has not one boy to carry his snuff-box." Items which were often buried alongside a Noble or a king included crowns, swords, brass pans, copper rods, umbrellas, sofas, mug, jugs, pots, plates, knives and forks, spoons, soap and several other ornaments. Walker attested that he had seen as much as £100 worth of goods kept in the grave of a chief. In rare instances, houses have been burnt because it was believed a king required a shelter to inhabit in the afterlife. The Iron Palace of Eyamba V was destroyed during the reign of King Archibong II because King Archibong claimed that he dreamt of King Eyamba V in the "ghostland" without a shelter and that King Eyamba had requested for his palace to be sent to him.

=== Death of a free-born in Old Calabar ===
People who were regarded as sons and daughters of the soil were entitled to a befitting burial while those of slave status had their corpses thrown into the bush. On the death of a free-born man or woman, there was pandemonium in the community. People left the town, schools were shut, parents refused to send their children to school because of the pre-eminent danger. Members of the family of the deceased would go into several houses and taking with them anyone they could lay hold of to the beach or the burial area where the victims would be slaughtered and thrown into the tomb of the noble or king. Hope Waddell gives an account on the death of King Eyamba V in May 1847:

For the king's interment a great pit was dug, wide and deep, inside a house, and at one side of it a chamber was excavated, in which were placed two sofas. On these the body was laid, dressed in its ornaments, and a crown on its head. Then his umbrella, sword, and snuff-box bearers, and other personal attendants, were suddenly killed, and thrown in with the insignia of their offices; and living virgins also, it was said, according to old custom. Great quantities of food, and trade goods, and coppers, were added; after which the pit was filled, and the ground trampled and beaten hard, that no trace of the grave might remain. Lest they should be violated, whether through revenge or cupidity, such precautions are always used to conceal the graves of the nobles.

Women of nobility and from royal families were also given such grand funeral ceremonies. Hope Waddell states that, "at the burial of a great woman lately, a man had been killed and thrown into her grave, and her two waiting-maids buried alive beside the corpse."

=== Death of a suspected witch ===
People who died while undergoing witch ordeals had their corpses thrown into the bush. Anyone who was suspected of witchcraft was never given what was regarded as an ordinary burial due to the belief in reincarnation. The eyes of suspected witches and wizards were equally removed from their sockets. A black cloth was tied around the head to shield the eyeless sockets. A perforated clay pot known as eso ntibe which is used for drying shrimps was placed over the head of the deceased and the corpse was thrown into the bush. Sometimes, the corpse of the deceased may be burned after the removal of the eyes. This was done to prevent the deceased individual from being exhumed.

== Decline of the Efik religion ==
With the arrival of the missionaries on April 10, 1846, the Efik people would experience several changes in their religious life. Several religious practices and superstitions eroded with the efforts of the missionaries and some Chiefs and Kings of Old Calabar. The signing of treaties with the British further aided in the stamping out of practices that were regarded as non-Christian. The 1851 treaty aided in the abolition of human sacrifices. On 21 January 1856, another treaty was signed at Obutong for the abolition of the poison ordeal. This treaty did not achieve its aim and on 6 September 1878, another treaty was signed confirming the abolition of human sacrifices; murder of twin babies and abolition of the poison ordeal. Christian beliefs also reduced the number of Ndem Adherents and may have contributed to the decline of the practice of Libation.

== See also ==
- Efik mythology

== Bibliography ==
- Akak, Eyo Okon (1982), Efiks of Old Calabar: Culture and Superstitions, vol. III, Calabar: Akak & Sons OCLC 773255520
- Kingsley, Mary (1899), West African Studies, London: Macmillan & Co. Ltd. OCLC 2652672
- Hackett, Rosalind I. J. (1989), Religion in Calabar: The religious life and history of a Nigerian town, Berlin: Mouton de Gruyter OCLC 470747014
- Walker, James Broom (1877). "Notes on the Politics, Religion, and Commerce of Old Calabar". The Journal of the Anthropological Institute of Great Britain and Ireland. 6: 119–24. doi:10.2307/2841125. JSTOR 2841125.
- Savage, Olayinka Margaret (1985). The Efik Political System: The Effervescence of Traditional Offices (PhD). University of Manchester.
- Jeffreys, Mervyn David Waldegrave (1966). "Witchcraft in the Calabar Province". African Studies. 25 (2): 95–100. doi:10.1080/00020186608707234.
- Daniell, W.F. (1848). "On the Natives of Old Callebar, West Coast of Africa". Journal of the Ethnological Society of London. 1: 210–227. doi:10.2307/3014087. JSTOR 3014087.
- Nair, Kannan K. (1972), Politics and Society in South Eastern Nigeria, 1841–1906: A Study of Power, Diplomacy and Commerce in Old Calabar, London: Frank Cass, ISBN 0-7146-2296-6
- Amaku, Ekpo Nta (1948), Edikot Ŋwed Mbuk 1, London: Thomas Nelson and Sons OCLC 990437200
- Aye, Efiong U. (1991), A learner's dictionary of the Efik Language, Volume 1, Ibadan: Evans Brothers Ltd, ISBN 9781675276
- Burton, Richard (1865), Wit and Wisdom from West Africa, London: Tinsley Brothers OCLC 4651217
- Hutchinson, Thomas J. (1858), Impressions of West Africa, London: Longman, Brown, Green, Longmans & Roberts OCLC 1046641528
- Goldie, Hugh (1862), Dictionary of the Efik Language, in two parts. I-Efik and English. II-English and Efik, Glassgow: Dunn and Wright
- Goldie, Hugh (1886), Dictionary of the Efik Language (Addenda), Edinburgh: United presbyterian college buildings OCLC 77580674
- Goldie, Hugh (1890), Calabar and its Mission, Edinburgh: Oliphant, Anderson & Ferrier.
- Aye, Efiong U. (1991), A learner's dictionary of the Efik Language, vol. I, Ibadan: Evans Brothers Ltd, ISBN 9781675276
- Simmons, Donald C. (1968) [1st pub. 1956], "An Ethnographic Sketch of the Efik people", in Forde, Daryll (ed.), Efik Traders of Old Calabar, London: Dawsons of Pall Mall OCLC 67514086
- Waddell, Hope Masterton (1863), Twenty-Nine Years in the West Indies and Central Africa, London: Nelson & Sons OCLC 862147545
- Simmons, Donald C. (1958). Analysis of the Reflection of Culture in Efik folktales (PhD). Yale University.
- Talbot, Percy Amaury (1923), Life in Southern Nigeria; the magic, beliefs, and customs of the Ibibio tribe, London: Macmillan and Co. OCLC 1687947
- Udoh, E. A. (1971), Report of Enquiry into the Obong of Calabar Dispute Vol.1, Calabar: The Government Printer
- Latham, A.J.H. (1973), Old Calabar (1600-1891): The Impact of the International Economy upon a Traditional Society, Oxford: Clarendon Press, ISBN 978-0-19-821687-2.
- Offiong, Michael Ukpong (1993). The ancestral cult of the Efik and the veneration of saints (Thesis). Pontificia Facultas theologica et Pontificium Institutum spiritualitatis Teresianum, Rome. OCLC 1203523445
- Aye, Efiong U. (1967), Old Calabar through the centuries, Calabar: Hope Waddell Press OCLC 476222042
