= Eyo Ephraim Adam =

Head of Etim Efiom House of Old Calabar

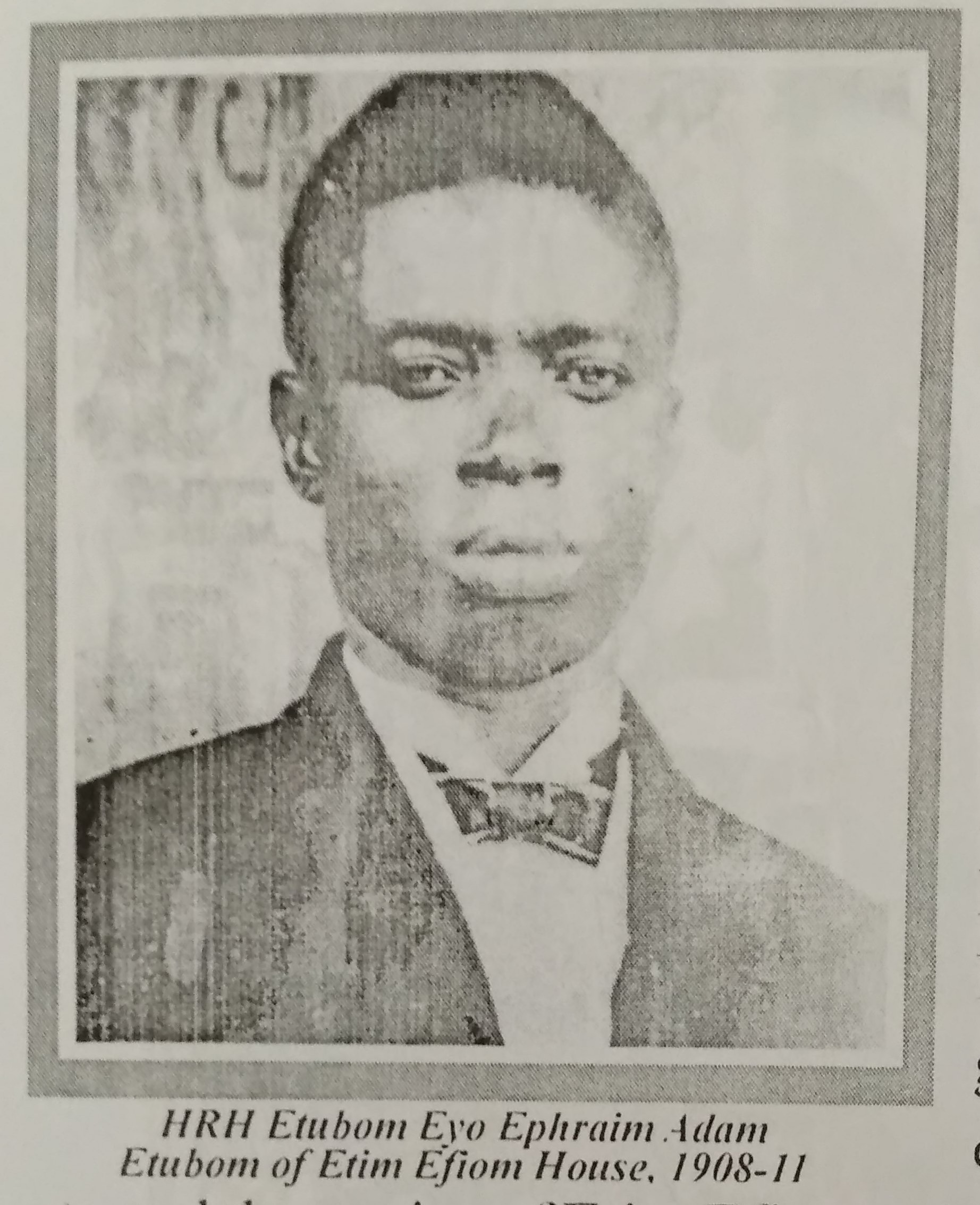
Etubom Eyo Ephraim Adam

Eyo Ephraim Adam (ca. 1849 – 1911) was the head of Etim Efiom royal house of Old Calabar from 1908 until his death on September 28, 1911. His father Ephraim Adam was the founder of the Tete household in Etim Efiom House. His mother Enang Otuk Oyom was equally from Etim Efiom House. He is credited to have aided in the spread of christianity in Akpabuyo, Nigeria.

== Independence of Etim Efiom Royal House ==
On the death of Obong Adam Ephraim Adam I in 1906, Eyo Ephraim assumed the position of family head of Etim Efiom sub-House of great Duke House. At this time, Etim Efiom was a sub-house of Duke House. Thus, the late Obong Adam Ephraim Adam I assumed leadership of Duke House albeit having paternal descent from Etim Efiom. Eyo contested for the role of Etubom of Duke House. The only other candidate who emerged in the contest was Adam Ephraim Duke the family-head of Efiong Essien/Okon Idem sub-house of the larger Duke House. With the full backing and support of members of the Duke Ephraim lineage; Adam Ephraim Duke succeeded as Etubom of great Duke House in 1906. This was one of the motivating factors for the move to liberate Etim Efiom house from Duke House. Prior to this period, Etim Efiom House originally known as Tom Ephraim House was established in 1790 and was later placed under regency in 1834 by Duke Ephraim. Thus, Eyo Ephraim together with Oyo-Ita and Eneyo houses sought their liberation from Duke House. Unlike the warring route taken by some kind of houses to assert their independence from Duke House, the fight for the independence of Etim Efiom house was taken to court. Unfortunately, Eyo Ephraim did not live to see the house being liberated as he died in 1911 leaving his fight for independence to his younger sibling, Ekpo Ephraim Adam. Etim Efiom House became autonomous on 11 April 1913.

== Legacy ==
The abolishment of the slave trade by the British did not mean that slaves residing in the West African region would be automatically liberated. Slave dealings were still ongoing in several parts of the new protectorate until the early 20th century. On 1 January 1902, the new protectorate government made the decision to abolish slave dealings in all parts of the protectorate. This was one of the first steps to the watering down of the slave institution in Old Calabar and its dependencies. On the abolition of slave dealings, The new administration had to deal with the imminent problem of shortage of labour as slaves made up the workforce in Old Calabar. A new labour policy had to be created with the aim of retaining slaves to provide labour facilities while reconciling the administration's previous stance on slave dealings with unmitigated forms of slavery. According to Nair, "The result was a compromise: gradual abolition of domestic slavery, and the retention of the traditional house system in such a way that the position of slaves was ameliorated. High Commissioner Moor felt that the only way in which slaves could be prevented from running away from the houses was to improve the conditions of slaves within them". In spite of the new policies which aimed to make the status of the slave less burdensome, slaves in the plantations were still prevented from gaining access to the benefits of Missionary presences and Formal Education. According to E. U. Aye, "The missionary made no effort to introduce Christianity into the plantations because he was not allowed to do so by Efik rulers who suspected the Christian dogma as a disruptive influence among the lower orders against the existing Ekpe plutocracy." Through the intervention of Eyo Ephraim Adam, Christianity was introduced into Akpabuyo. The foundation was first laid at Ikot Uba where Eyo introduced the Presbyterian Church and then at Ikot Nakanda. Through his efforts in spreading the Christian faith, the missionaries received a large number of Christian adherents. The Christian religion permeated through villages such as Esuk Mba, Ifondo, Nkakat Ikot Akiriba, Ikot Eneyo, Akwa Obio Inwang Nsidung, Ikot Mbakara, Ekpene Tete and several other villages.

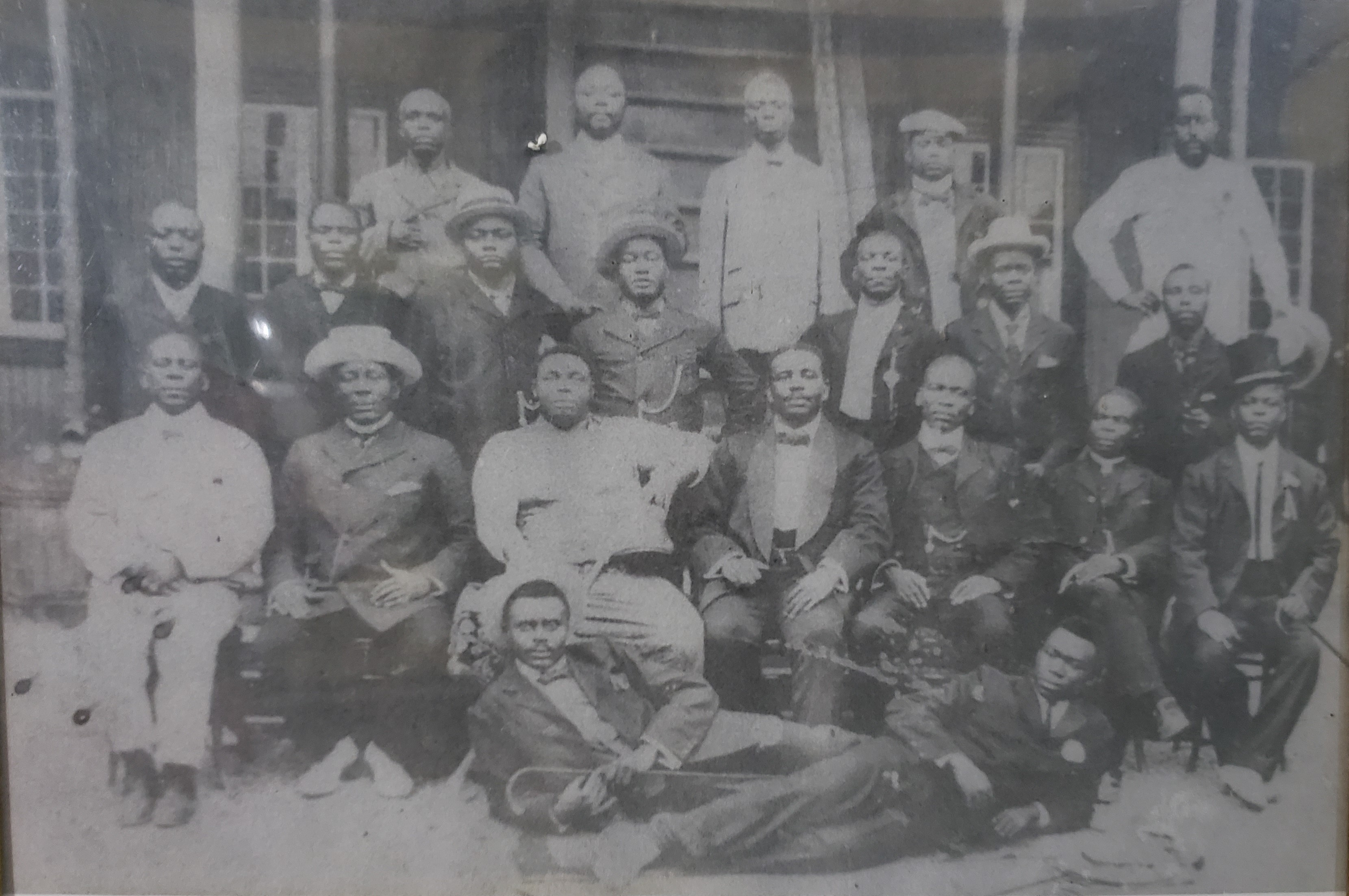
Members of the Old Calabar Judicial Council (1902–1906). Standing back row : Edet Efiong Otu, Esien Ekpe Hogan-Bassey, Eyo Ephraim Adam, Offiong Ekpenyong Eyo II, Okon Efio Efana. Standing second row : Ekei Ephraim Adam, Enian Esien, Efa Etim Efa, Umo Ephraim Adam, Ekpenyong Nkana, Ekeng Efana, Harold Duke Henshaw. Sitting : Asuquo Ekpenyong Oku, Ani Eniang Offiong, Bassey Duke Ephraim, Daniel Henshaw, Asuquo Ekpenyong Nsa, Rev Itam Itam Okpo, Efiong Ekpenyong Oku. Foreground: George Duke Henshaw, Ekpenyong Ekpenyong Eyo II.

Etubom Eyo was a politically active member of the Efik society. He was president of the Efik National Society in 1905 and was also a member of the Old Calabar judicial council from 1902 together with his brothers Ekei Ephraim Adam and Umo Ephraim Adam. Other members of the Old Calabar Judicial included Prince Bassey Duke Ephraim, Ani Eniang Offiong, George Duke Henshaw, Esien Ekpe Hogan-Bassey and several others. Within the Ekpe society of Old Calabar, Etubom Eyo held the title of Obong Mboko. His Children included, Edidem Bassey Eyo Ephraim Adam III, Eyo Eyo Ephraim Adam, Utong Eyo Ephraim Adam and several others.
