= Bassey Eyo Ephraim Adam III =

Edidem Efik Eburutu

Bassey Adam III
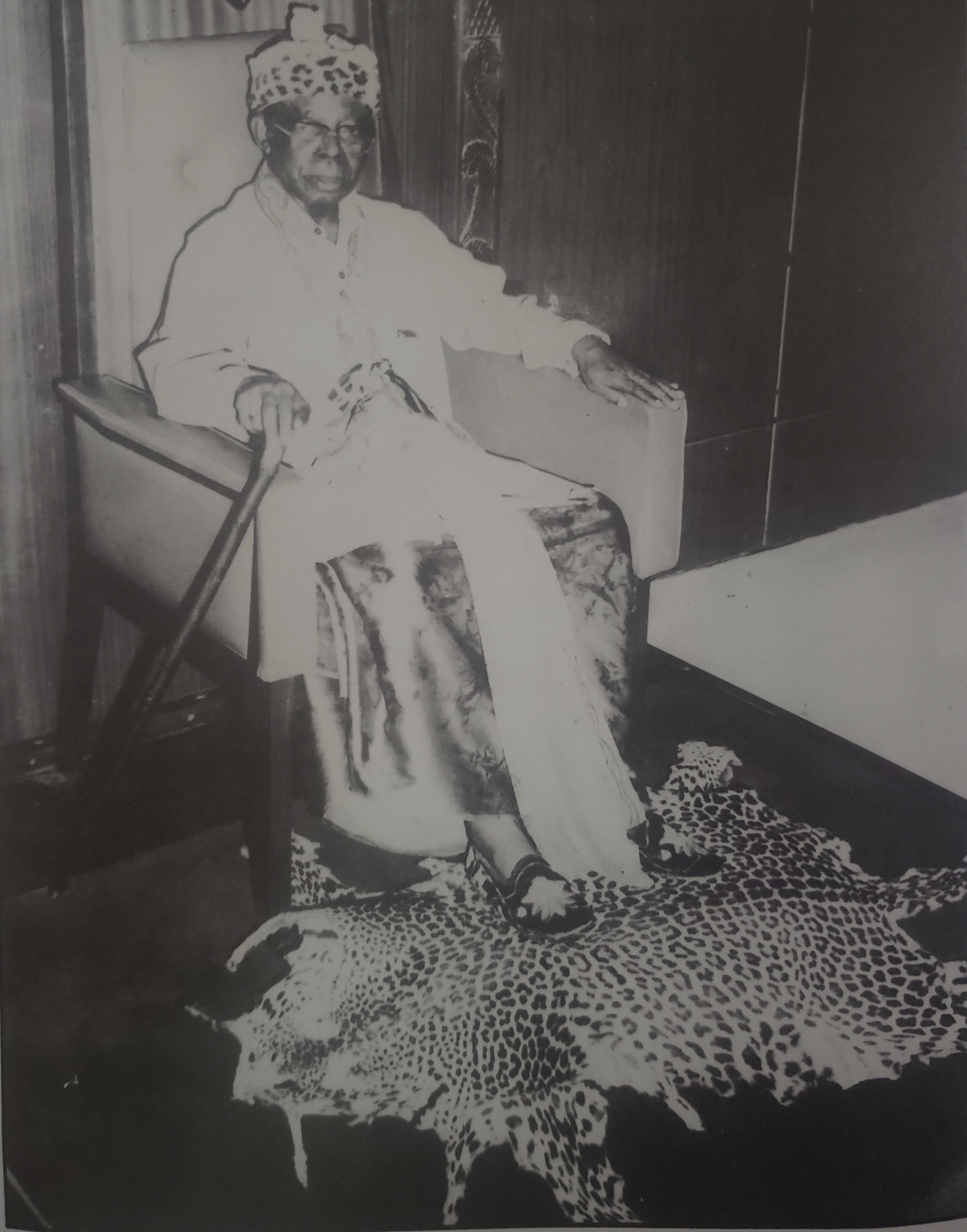

Obong of Calabar
- Reign: 1982–1986
- Coronation: 27 November 1982
- Predecessor: Esien Ekpe Oku V
- Successor: Otu Ekpenyong Effa IX

Etubom of Etim Efiom
- Reign: 1979–1982
- Spouses: Winifred Omotunde St. Matthew-Daniels (divorced); Alice Ekei Efiong Duke (married)
- House: Etim Efiom
- Father: Eyo Ephraim Adam

Bassey Adam III (Abasi Eyo Efiom Ededem Edak Edem Etim Efiom Okoho Efiom Ekpo Efiom Ekpo; 25 December 1904 – 14 December 1986) was the Obong of Calabar and the Edidem of the Efik kingdom from 27 November 1982 until his death on 14 December 1986. Bassey was born in Calabar, during the reign of his Uncle Obong Adam Ephraim Adam as the Obong of Old Calabar and its dependencies. His father was Etubom Eyo Ephraim Adam (Eyo Efiom Ededem), the second son of Ephraim Adam (Alias Tete) of Etim Efiom royal house of Old Calabar. His mother was Princess Eyoanwan Eyo Edem of Duke royal house of Old Calabar.

== Early life ==
He was born on 25 December 1904 and named Bassey Eyo Ephraim Adam. His father Eyo Ephraim Adam was from Etim Efiom royal house of Old Calabar and was also a one-time head of the House from 1906 to 1911. His mother Eyoanwan Eyo Edem was the Granddaughter of Edem Ekpo, one of the patriarchs of the Duke royal house. Eyoanwan Eyo Edem was maternally of Efut Nobility. Her mother Inima Okon was from Odionka Ebuka royal house in Efut Abua, Calabar. Bassey's paternal Grandfather was Ephraim Adam, the founder of the Tete household. Edidem Bassey Adam III was paternally and maternally of noble birth.

Some of his siblings included Eyo Eyo Ephraim Adam, Umo Eyo Ephraim Adam, Utong Ekong (Nee Eyo Ephraim Adam) and several others.

== Education ==
Bassey attended the Church of Scotland Mission School, Ikot Efio Enang at Akpabuyo and later transferred to the Duke Town school. At the Duke Town primary school, he undertook and successfully passed the Preliminary Cambridge examination in 1922. In 1923, he proceeded to the Normal College at Hope Waddell Training Institution and from 1924 to 1925, he attended King's College, Lagos, where he completed his secondary education and later sat for and passed the London University Matriculation Examination. Between 1926 and 1930, Bassey received his professional education in the following institutions i.e., Grammar School, Freetown, Sierra Leone; Engineering School, Public Works Department, Lagos; Electrical School, Public Works Department, Lagos and Bournemouth School of Engineering, United Kingdom. This long period of training resulted in his obtaining the Diploma of the institute of Service Engineers in Kent as an Associate member.

== Calabar Ogoja Rivers (COR) State Movement ==
The History of the Agitation of the Calabar-Ogoja-Rivers state in the Eastern region of Nigeria would be incomplete without the mention of Bassey who was living at Jos, Plateau State at the time. Bassey's residence at Jos was a meeting ground mostly for people from the Old Calabar Province, although he was not discriminatory towards other ethnicities. When Bassey was informed of his people's desire for the creation of the COR state, he readily embraced the idea which he propagated across Northern Nigeria. Bassey's advantage over many during the period of the agitation was his familiarity with many important personalities across Northern Nigeria. Bassey who was a reputable Electrical Engineer had executed several electrical and building contracts across Northern Nigeria which endeared him to many notable figures in the North. He readily planted branches of the movement in various towns in the North and together with men such as Chief Usoro of Ibiono, caused financial contributions to be made into the coffers of the movement in the state.

== Enthronement as a Traditional Ruler ==
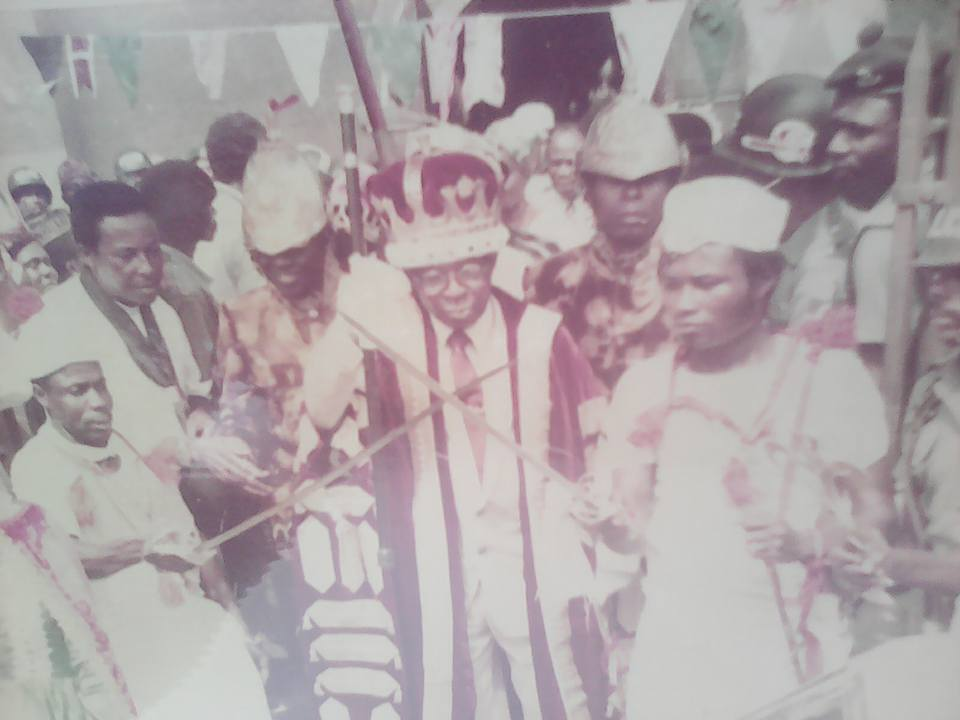
Coronation of Edidem Bassey Eyo Ephraim Adam III on 27 November 1982

The personal attributes of Bassey led to his selection as the best choice for the office of the Etubom of Etim Efiom House. Bassey succeeded Etubom Umo Eyo Ephraim Adam as the Etubom of Etim Efiom house in 1979 and was inducted into the Etubom's Traditional Council by Edidem Esien Ekpe Oku V. On 14 January 1982, Edidem Esien Ekpe Oku had passed on. This led to the search for a worthy candidate for the stool of the Obong of Calabar. The contenders of the throne were Etubom Cobham Eneyo Boco who was Etubom Bassey's maternal first cousin. After a tightly contested battle, Etubom Bassey was selected on the 8 November 1982 as the preferred candidate and proclaimed Obong-Elect on 9 November 1982. He was crowned at the Duke Town Presbyterian Church on 27 November 1982.

== State Tours ==
The military takeover of Nigeria's administration in 1984 saw the birth of the War Against Indiscipline (WAI). It was brought home to everyone that indiscipline had many faces and when Colonel Daniel Archibong assumed the office of Governor of Cross River State and directed that all Paramount Rulers should educate their subjects on WAI "gospel" which was 'Cleanliness and performance of such Civic duties as payment of taxes and rates'. Again when Colonel Archibong observed on assumption of office that there was great need for unity among all the ethnic components of the Cross River State, he also added another campaign to WAI. This time, it was "War Against Disunity". A statewide tour of all the seventeen Local Government Areas was organised and all the paramount rulers together visited each of the LGA's. At that time, Edidem Adam had trouble with his vision and could not accompany them. After his recovery, another man would not perhaps have bothered to resume the tours but he immediately started his own round of tours to Ikom, Obubra and Obudu. Ogoja was left out because the Paramount Ruler for that are was ill and in the hospital at the time. Edidem Adam also undertook official trips outside Cross River State. He went to Enugu to witness the inaugural ceremony of the Anambra State Council of Chiefs and to Owerri to witness the inauguration of the Imo State Council of Chiefs. His second visit to Owerri was as a guest of the Imo State University of Science and Technology on the occasion of the launching of the University's Development Fund. On that occasion, he made an endowment of ₦500.00 to the best student in Electrical Engineering in the University. Two other trips to the eastern part of Nigeria took him to Nsukka to witness the 1986 convocation ceremony and silver jubilee celebration of the University of Nigeria and to Onitsha to visit his lifelong friend, Mr. Justice U. Agbakoba.

== Ancestry ==
Ancestors of Bassey Eyo Ephraim Adam III

8. Edem Edak
29. Etim Efiom Okoho Efiom Ekpo
23. Edem Etim
30. Arit Ekpo
15. Edak Edem
4. Efiom Ededem (Alias Tete)
16. Efiom Ikot Okpo
9. Ekei Efiom
2. Eyo Efiom Ededem
24. Esu Ana
17. Etieya Esu
10. Otuk Etieya
18. Oyom
5. Enang Otuk Oyom
1. Bassey Eyo Ephraim Adam
25. Efiom Okoho
31. Okoho Efiom
19. Ekpo Efiom
11. Edem Ekpo
26. Efembe Umo
20. Umo Efembe
6. Eyo Edem
12. Ansa Inyang
21. Inyang Efiom
27. Efiom Nsa
3. Eyoanwan Eyo Edem
28. Eta Odionka
22. Ambo Eta
13. Okon Ambo
7. Inima
14. Uyu Asuquo

== Bibliography ==
- "Souvenir programme of the Coronation Service of his Royal Highness Edidem Bassey Eyo Ephraim Adam III", Scribd, Calabar: The Government Printer, 1982.
- "Programme of the Memorial Service of HRH Edidem Bassey Eyo Ephraim Adam III: Late Obong of Calabar and Paramount Ruler of the Efiks", Scribd, Calabar: Cross River State Newspaper Corporation, 1986.
- Duke, Orok Orok Effiom (2006), Three Famous Kings of Calabar, their lives and times(1908-1961), Calabar: Clear Lines Publications, ISBN 978-38524-3-4.
- Latham, A.J.H. (1973), Old Calabar (1600-1891): The Impact of the International Economy upon a Traditional Society, Oxford: Clarendon Press.
- Hart, A. Kalada (1964), Report of the Enquiry into the Dispute Over the Obongship of Calabar, Enugu: The Government Printer OCLC 32857131.
- Duke, Orok Orok Effiom (2008), Great Calabar Chronicle: People, World Events and Dates, 1500-2007, Calabar: Clinprint International, ISBN 978-016-624-6.
- Bassey, Andrew (1984), A People's Struggles for Survival, Calabar: Associate Publishers and Consultants Ltd., ISBN 978-978-971-978-5.
- Duke, Orok Orok Efiom (2015), 20th Century Famous Kings and Eminent Persons of Calabar, Calabar: Excel Publishers, ISBN 978-051-036-2 OCLC 1084506344.
