= Alexander Ross (missionary) =

Scottish missionary and explorer

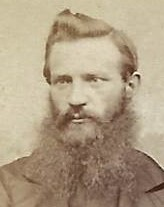
- Born: 31 October 1838; Urquhart and Logie Wester, Scotland
- Died: 6 May 1884 (aged 45); Old Calabar, West Africa (today Akwa Akpa)
- Known for: Dispute with fellow missionary, William Anderson, and exploration of the Cross River State area in Nigeria and Rio del Rey estuary in Cameroon
- Spouse: Jane Innes (m. 1874)
- Children: 2

Alexander Ross (31 October 1838 – 6 May 1884) was a Scottish missionary with the United Presbyterian Church (Scotland) in Duke Town, Old Calabar, West Africa along with other notable missionaries including William Anderson, Hugh Goldie, and Mary Slessor. Making two separate expeditions in 1877 and 1878, Ross was the first white man to venture south of Old Calabar to the palm-oil town of Odobo. He discovered the Falls of Komè ('Düben' falls]) on the River Meme and recorded details of the places, customs and languages of Efut. In 1881 the Mission was torn apart by a schism between Ross and Anderson that was to be a crucial link in the chain of events which led to the annexation by Britain of the territory from Calabar to the Niger.

== Early life ==
Ross was born on 31 October 1838 at Braefindon in the parish of Urquhart and Logie Wester, Ross and Cromarty, Scotland. He was the second of twelve children born to Ranald Ross, a carpenter, and his wife, Janet (née Ellison). By the age of twelve, Ross was employed as a farm servant in the nearby parish of Kiltearn and, ten years later, in 1861, he was a coachman for Allan Maclean, Chieftain of the Clan Maclean, at Dochgarroch near Inverness.

From boyhood, it had been Ross's desire to become a missionary abroad. During his formative years, it is likely that he would have attended Ferintosh Free Church, close to the natural amphitheater of the Ferintosh Burn where thousands of people came from across the Highlands to hear the Rev. John MacDonald preach with "superstitious fear and awe".

By 1864, Ross was a member of the United Presbyterian Church (Scotland), at Queen Street, Inverness and expressed his desire to attend college as a Gaelic student. He enrolled as a student at the Divinity Hall, Edinburgh in 1867 and began preaching at Baligrundle Church, Lismore in April 1868. Remaining there for seven and a half years, first as a missionary student, then as a licenciate and lastly as an ordained minister, he was loosed in October 1875 "amidst expressions of unabated affection" to fulfil his ambition of becoming a missionary and, within two months, was appointed to Duke Town, Old Calabar, West Africa.

== Missionary Work and Expeditions ==
Ross, and his wife and child, sailed from Glasgow via Liverpool for Old Calabar at the end of October 1875. On arrival, he was associated with the senior pastor, Rev. William Anderson.

The Calabar mission was established in 1846 by Hope Masterton Waddell, a Scottish Missionary Society missionary. He was joined by William Anderson in 1849, who remained prominent at the station until 1891, and by Hugh Goldie who became the mission's leading Efik language scholar and translator. Although small in numbers, the mission had an influence dis-proportionate to its size and was successful in obtaining the abolition of some of the barbaric customs of Calabar such as the murder of twin babies and the poison-bean (Physostigma venenosum) ordeal.

Ross set-about learning the Efik language and deputised for Anderson who returned to Scotland on furlough shortly after Ross' arrival. During the next twenty months he built a new school house, removed the Ikunetu mission-house to Duke Town, and secured funds to renovate the church. On 11 September 1876, Ross was the first person to greet Mary Slessor on her arrival at the anchorage of Old Calabar.

=== Expeditions ===
Early in 1877, Ross embarked on the first of two major expeditions to Efut country and was the first white person to venture southeast from Old Calabar. Leaving on 30 January, he was accompanied on the boat trip by fellow missionary, Mrs Sutherland, and Prince James Eyamba, one of the leading chiefs and an elder in the church, with whom he had developed good relations. They were guided by Yellow Duke, a major palm-oil trader who had connections with the Archibong family and a base at Odobo The expedition travelled south from Duke Town on the Calabar River, entered the Qua River estuary, and passed through three long creeks, before crossing the Rio del Rey to reach the palm-oil town of Odobo, which was only re-discovered in 1885 by Swedish traders Georg Waldau and Knut Knutson. Ross continued north to Ekpri Okunde, and then twenty miles south-east to discover the Falls of Komè, later named in 1887 by Waldau as the 'Düben' falls on the River Meme.

A year later, departing on 3 December, Ross followed the same route, arriving at an unknown lake in south west Cameroon. Without knowledge of his predecessors, Comber and Thomson, who had discovered the lake some months earlier as Lake Rickards (today Lake Barombi Koto), Ross named it Lake Paton in honour of a keen missionary family in the church.

On both expeditions, Ross recorded detailed descriptions of the customs of Efut, including the structure of their society, the use of idols, and the rituals held at birth and death. He also documented the various tongues spoken in over sixty eight towns and identified nine dialects of the Cameroons language, exclusive of the Efik language.

Of his journeys to Efut, Ross said,

If exploration is the precursor of civilization and Christianity, I trust that by visiting Efut I have done something to hasten the dawn of a better day for that benighted country.

During 1878, Ross made a shorter trip north from Duke Town, largely on foot, and was the first European to visit the class of natives known as the Blood-Men. Accompanied by Captain James Broom Walker F.R.G.S, the resident trade manager who had stayed in Old Calabar for many years and explored various parts of the country, Ross met the newly elected king of the blood-men, Assay Eyo, with whom he became very friendly and who later visited him at Duke Town. Ross was saddened to find that the custom of killing for the dead using the poison-bean ordeal was still secretly practised in some places in Calabar, in spite of an agreement between the Chiefs and British Consul to prohibit the tradition.

Returning to Scotland on furlough in 1879, Ross addressed several public meetings across Scotland to help promote the work of missionaries abroad. His talk on 26 February 1880, at the St. Andrews U.P. Church in Ceres, Fife, about "how the gospel had won its way in these distant and benighted lands in the face of prejudice, ignorance and opposition", was told in "graphic and vigorous language and listened to with rapt attention".

== Dispute ==
Between 1879 and 1881, growing tensions between Ross and Anderson developed into a schism involving the United Presbyterian Church, the British government, and local rulers within Old Calabar. Anderson, now an ageing figure, had seen many changes during his tenure at the mission and recognised that the pace of progress was, necessarily, slow. On the other hand, Ross was young and energetic and impatient to see further improvements to the humanitarian conditions within Old Calabar.

The barbarous activities of the Ekpe runners were of particular concern to Ross. These were masked young men, who enforced the laws of the Efik society through terror and subjugation, often involving the killing of women, children and slaves. While on furlough in Scotland in 1879, he sent a petition to the Foreign Secretary of the British government requesting intervention by the British Consul. The letter described some of the activities of the Ekpe runners including one incident involving a pregnant women who had been flogged to death causing her to give birth, and another case of a woman killed by having her neck broken. The petition was signed by Prince James Eyamba certifying the details of both events. Such accusations against the Ekpe runners caused a reaction amongst the trading agents in Duke Town, some of whom were members of Ekpe and concerned about any potential disruption to the flow of goods should the British Consul impose new laws. They also sent a letter to the Foreign Secretary pointing out that all the accusations made by Ross against Ekpe were untrue. Meanwhile, the Foreign Mission Board of the United Presbyterian Church received a petition from the Regent (King Archibong III of Calabar) and eleven other Calabar chiefs asking that Ross not return to the country, because his attempts at social reform were high-handed and his command of Efik was imperfect. When asked to comment, Ross described the signatories as "murderous tyrants and oppressors whom he used to denounce for their wickedness and who trembled before him when he reasoned of righteousness, temperance and judgement to come". Anderson, too, was infuriated by Ross's actions and was plotting against him with letters to the Foreign Mission Board saying that Eyamba and company should be ignored.

The situation became further complicated when, in 1879, King Archibong III died. The three obvious candidates for his succession were Prince Duke, Prince Archibong, and Prince James Eyamba. Anderson supported Prince Duke, as did the trading agents, and Ross threw his energies into supporting Prince James Embaya in the hope that a Christian king would advance the cause of Christianity and humanitarian reform. In March 1880, and avoiding the traditional process of election involving the poison-bean ordeal, Acting Consul Easton crowned Prince Duke as King Duke Eyamba IX. Considerable discontent followed and Consul Hewett asked the Chiefs to meet to elect a king of their own choice.

When Ross returned to Calabar in 1881, the antagonism between himself and Anderson came to a head and the Foreign Mission Committee dispatched a deputation to investigate the situation on the ground in December that year. On Christmas Day, the deputation censored some acts of Anderson but found against Ross and requested him to leave Calabar and return home. He declined the invitation and tendered his resignation from the Ministry and immediately, supported by Prince James Embaya, set up his own independent mission taking with him five teachers and a substantial part of the congregation.

Ross's secession, together with support from the Eyamba and the Henshaw families, only further exacerbated the political problem in Calabar. The rivalry between candidates for the succession of the crown continued and Prince Archibong, free from the trammels of any European support, pursued a policy of violence. In August 1882, Prince Duke was elected by the chiefs and crowned, once again, by the Consul but this re-affirmation only guaranteed that Calabar's difficulties would continue. Preferring British rule to the rule of King Duke, and to avoid all out war, Prince James Eyamba sent many letters to the Foreign Office during 1883 pressing for annexation by the British government as the only remedy. On 24 July 1884 the British Consul signed a treaty of 'favour and protection' with King Duke and, afterwards, with all the Chiefs along the Niger Coast. Two months previously, on 6 May 1884, Ross died although he would clearly have been delighted with the outcome of the situation.

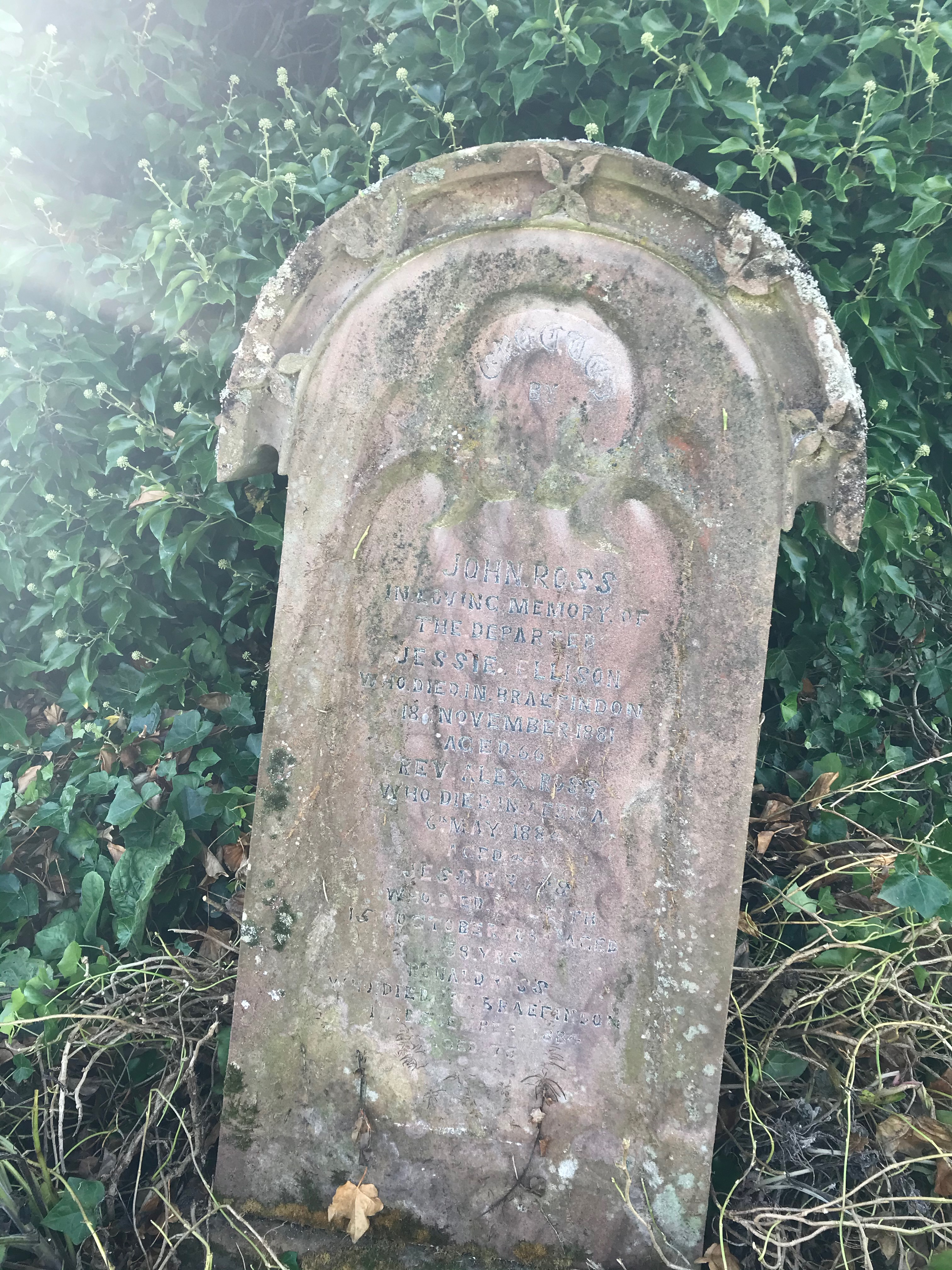
Gravestone with inscription for Alex Ross, Old Urquhart Graveyard, Conon Bridge, Ross and Cromarty, Scotland

After his death, it was expected that many from the congregation of the 'Alexander Ross Mission' would return to the United Presbyterian Church, but they did not, and Mrs Ross found a successor from the Grattan Guinness Institute in London to perpetuate the work of the schism. The mission continued to flourish for several years and, in 1903, additional funds were sought for a larger church building. Details on its eventual fate are scarce but it seems that it was taken over by the Apostolic Church after some association with the Primitive Methodists and the Qua Iboe Mission.

== Death ==
Ross died at Duke Town on 6 May 1884 from dysentery after a few days illness and was laid to rest, with Mrs. Ross's consent, in the mission burying ground. Inscribed on a family gravestone at Urquhart Old Churchyard at Conon Bridge, Ross and Cromarty, Scotland is the dedication: REV. ALEX ROSS WHO DIED IN AFRICA 6TH MAY 1884 AGED 44.

== Family ==
At the age of 34, on 21 August 1874 at 22 Rutland Square, Edinburgh, Ross married Jane Innes who was the second eldest surviving daughter of William Innes, Union Bank of Scotland. Their first son, Ranald Alexander Ross, was born on 18 June 1875 at the U.P. Manse in Lismore. Five years later while on furlough, Mrs. Ross gave birth, prematurely, to their second child, William Innes Whitson Ross on 13 June 1880 in Edinburgh. William died one year later, in July 1881, not long after the family had returned to Duke Town. After the death of her husband in 1884, Mrs. Ross died of fever on 21 April 1890 at Duke Town.
