= Orok Edem-Odo =

Obong of Calabar

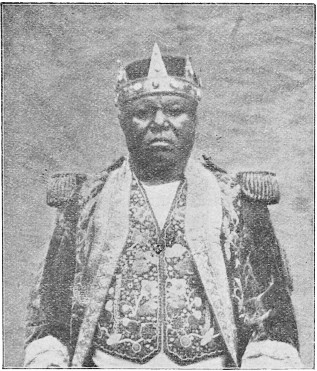

Obong of Calabar
- Reign: 1880 – 1896
- Coronation: April 17, 1880
- Predecessor: Archibong III
- Successor: Adam Ephraim Adam I

Iyamba IX
- Predecessor: Efiom John Eyamba
- Successor: James Eyamba
- Wives: Ibok Efefiong Essien; Andem Oko Abasi
- House: Duke House
- Father: Edem-Odo Edem Ekpo
- Mother: Ekanem Ama

Orok Edem-Odo (Orok Edem-Odo Edem Ekpo Efiom Okoho Efiom Ekpo Efiom Ekpo) also known as Eyamba IX or King Duke IX was the Obong of Calabar from 17 April 1880 to 21 November 1896. His father Edem-Odo Edem Ekpo was the Obong of Calabar from 1854 to 1858. His mother was Ekanem Ama from the Eta Odionka family of Efut Abua, Calabar.

== Selection for kingship ==
After the death of King Archibong III in 1879, there was a fierce contest over his successor. Three candidates showed interest in the stool of the Obong of Calabar. The candidates included Prince James Eyamba, son of Eyamba V and who later became Eyamba X; Prince Asibong Edem, son of Archibong III and Prince Orok Edem-Odo, son of Edem-Odo Edem Ekpo. The abolishment of several customs insidiously used in the past to eliminate potential candidates to the stool of the Obong, made the matter more complex. All three candidates came from notable families. The presentation of a candidate from the Archibong family of the Duke Ward signified internal dissension within the Duke House. In a bid to swiftly solve the leadership crisis, Acting Consul Easton crowned Orok Edem-Odo as the Obong of Calabar on 15 March 1880. The crowning of Obong Edem-Odo only aggravated the Chiefs of Old Calabar who were displeased with the foisting of a king on the people against their wishes. The case was reopened, giving time for Prince James Eyamba and Prince Asibong to organise their campaign.

At this time, foreign missionaries took interest in the kingship tussles of Calabar. Two leading missionaries i.e., Reverend William Anderson and Reverend Ross played important roles in the contest. These missionaries had different views regarding who should be the next Obong of Calabar with Reverend Anderson supporting Prince Duke and Reverend Ross supporting Prince Eyamba. Rev. Anderson who had lived in Calabar longer than Reverend Ross believed Prince Orok Edem-Odo albeit a traditionalist was a better option to Prince James Eyamba. He believed the election of a king from an impoverished Eyamba Ward would be a mistake. On the other hand, Rev. Ross choice of candidacy was due to his belief that the next monarch would advance the cause of Christianity and stamp out non-Christian practices. Rev. Ross rebuked Rev. Anderson for what he termed his 'support of cruel and unconverted chiefs and his general toleration of barbarous custom.' The antagonism between both ministers had reached a peak that an independent enquiry was set-up by the Scottish mission to investigate the cause of their quarrel. The result was that Rev. Anderson was reproached and Rev. Ross was instructed to go home. Rev. Ross refused to return home and resigned from the Scottish Mission in 1881.

Prince James believed that by wooing the British, he would receive support for his claim to the throne. Thus, he wrote severally to the British stressing his active Christian life as a justification for his elevation which he believed differentiated him from Prince Orok Edem-Odo. Meanwhile, Prince Asibong Edem chose a more violent course of action, executing those who were not in support of his candidacy. Prince Asibong's violent activities nearly precipitated war with the wards concerned. In August 1882, Consul Edward H. Hewett summoned the Chiefs of Calabar to elect a king and regardless of their previous reservations, Prince Orok Edem-Odo was chosen and crowned on 8 August.

== Reign ==
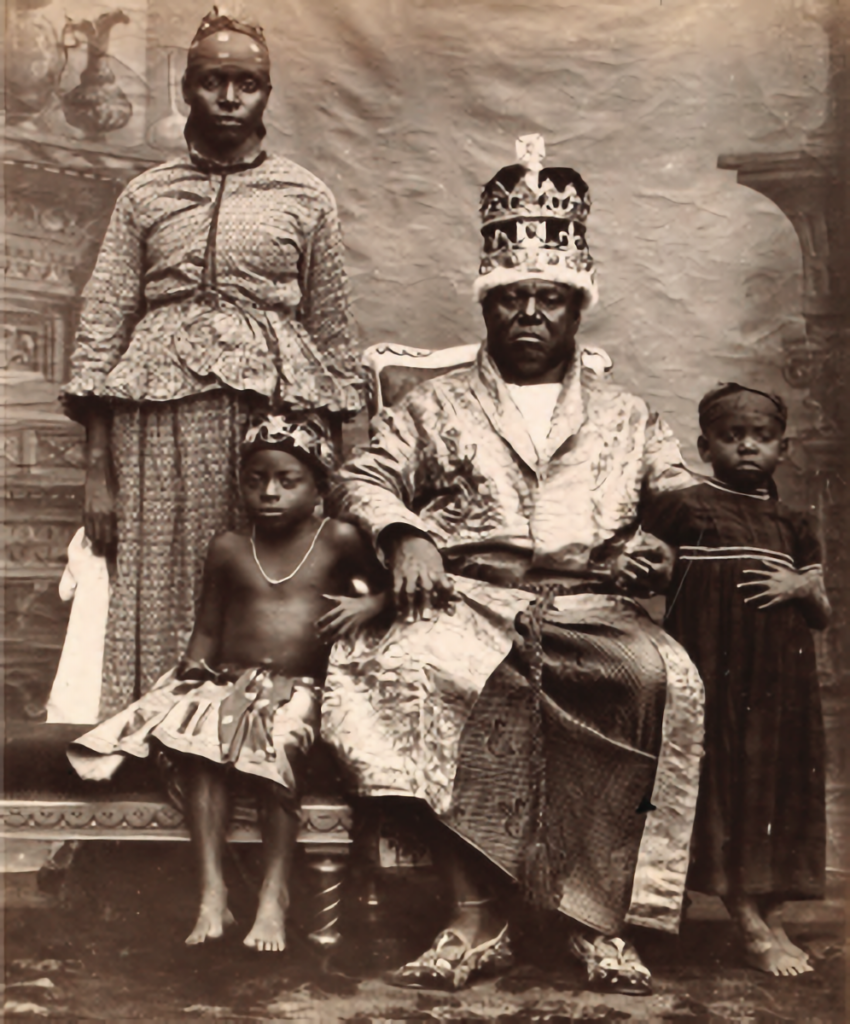
Obong Orok Edem-Odo with one of his wives and children

Kannan K. Nair describes Orok's reign as a "melancholy period in Calabar history", further stating that several complaints were lodged against his administration. Indeed, several letters were sent to the British by the Henshaw Town people and the Eyamba ward of Duke Town during his reign. In August 1883, the Henshaw ward launched a petition to the Consul stating that they were being distrusted by the Duke Town people because they rarely attended the meetings at Duke Town and were absent at the Coronation of Obong Orok Edem-Odo. The reason for their absence at the coronation of Obong Orok Edem-Odo is unknown. However, it would not be out of place to suggest that Orok Edem-Odo's involvement in the Hensho/Dukean War of 1875 would remind them of their losses during the war.

Treaty of 1884

With the inability of the Eyamba ward to secure the Obongship and the office of the Iyamba Ekpe Efik Iboku, they chose to push for the annexation of Calabar by the British. Several letters were sent to the foreign office by the Eyamba Ward, complaining of the "barbarities" of Obong Orok, the violent acts of Prince Archibong Edem and further demanding for the country's annexation as the only resolution to the troubles at Calabar. The push for annexation albeit spiteful was the made by the Eyamba ward to secure British protection for themselves as Prince Archibong Edem had killed one of their people and imprisoned two dozen. The wishes of the Eyamba Ward were not adhered to until later in 1884 when Consul Hewett proceeded to Calabar when he signed a treaty of protection with Obong Orok Edem-Odo and Obong Eyo Honesty VII.

Independence of Archibong Royal House in 1885

On January 1, 1885, there was a disagreement between the Archibong and Duke ward. It was greatly feared that the matter would result to a civil war which spread from the farms into the Towns. Latham asserts that though the dispute had broken out at the farms, the fundamental cause of the acrimony was Prince Archibong's disappointment in the Obongship dispute. Another account by H.O. Anderson states that the argument started over the price of fish in the Market. Anderson further states that the quarrel was between the Archibong, Odok and Tete families of Calabar. Nevertheless, the matter was of great severity that Prince James Eyamba wrote to the chairman of court of equity pleading that one or two members should be sent to accompany him to settle the matter before it was too late. The leader of the Archibong Ward was Prince Archibong Edem, the ex-candidate of the Obongship election.

According to Latham,

The hostilities were begun with Archibong Edem's boys firing the first gun. Since this was acknowledged by Archibong himself, Consul Hewett fined him two puncheons of oil. It was also decided that should the public peace be again disturbed, the guilty party would be subject to a fine of fifty puncheons of oil for the payment of which the town would be held responsible.

In spite of Consul Hewett's intervention, relations between the Archibong Ward and the Duke Ward were deteriorating. Prince Archibong complained that prisoners carried away by the Duke Ward had not been returned to him. Since Archibong could not resolve the matters via war, he chose to leave the town. Thus, in 1885 and during the reign of Obong Orok Edem-Odo, the Prince Archibong left Duke Town with his retinue and established Archibong town close to the present town of Usahadet.

Declining trade

According to Oku,

In the commercial fields, there were price fluctuations in the oil market and these affected political events in Lagos and Calabar for although the unrest in Calabar, after 1879 originated from the struggle for office it might have been aggravated by the fall in prices which were described as extremely good between 1883 and 1884 when Britain established the protectorate but after this period, 'plunged to their all-time low.

The freemen of the various city-states of old Calabar were at liberty to trade as they please with the European traders under the government of the Ekpe society. With more and more British involvement in the internal affairs of Old Calabar, this trade was gradually being hindered. The long history of treaties made between the Chiefs and Kings of Old Calabar and the British culminated to the 1884 treaty which placed the Consul at the same level with the Obong of Calabar and Creek Town respectively. In 1888, Consul Johnston halted the trading activities of twenty-three Efik traders who were in debt to the British agents. Although Obong Orok was not affected by the injunction, more than half of the leading Efik traders in Old Calabar were affected including Obong Orok's adversaries. This show of power marked an end to the rule of the Kings and Chiefs of Old Calabar.

Ndem-Eno War (1890)

The Ndem-Eno war of 1890 occurred between Old Calabar and Eniong during the reign of Obong Orok Edem-Odo. Ndem-Eno was a powerful chief of Eniong who lived at Atan Onoyom. He was guarding the Cross River up to Umon and forbade stranger traders from passing directly to trade with the Umon people. Ndem Eno had for some time been seizing canoes and murdering occupants. Hence, he also plundered and raided several Efik canoes. The genesis of the war occurred when Ndem Eno seized the goods of Chief Coco-Bassey. Chief Coco-Bassey reported the matter to Consul Annesley. The Consul attempted to negotiate with Ndem Eno but to no avail. The outcome of the interaction between Consul Annesley and Ndem Eno displeased the Efik whose sympathies lay with the Consul. Obong Orok with the support of the protectorate officials, chose to wage war on the Eniong. The Efik were very well armed, having two Gatling guns, five twelve-pounders and each man having a rifle. Obong Orok had a fleet of seventy war canoes which on the average contained about twenty men each. Prince Archibong Edem of Old Calabar also took part in the war. He owned a large canoe known as “Afrike” and reputed to be about seventy feet long and ten feet wide. He also owned a machine gun, nicknamed “Udep-Edim Asibong Edem” (Asibong Edem's rainfall or downpour) because of the total number of bullets fired from it.

According to Goldie,

The Consul took the unwise course of inviting the Efik people to make war on Ndem Eno, and an expedition was fitted out. But that chief did not wait the arrival of the war-canoes of Efik, but betook himself with his people to the bush, where he was safe. The burning of his town was all that was accomplished, a trifling loss to the Enyong chief, as a Calabar town can be erected with little labour. The expedition returned to Duke Town, and Ndem Eno came forth from his retreat to pursue his old tactics, as soon as the advent of the dry season made the river too shallow for a warlike expedition.

Obong Orok Edem-Odo died in 1896, leaving behind many children.

== Ancestry ==
Ancestors of Orok Edem-Odo

7. Efiom Okoho
5. Ekpo Efiom
4. Edem Ekpo
8. Efembe Umo
6. Umo Efembe
2. Edem-Odo
1. Orok Edem-Odo
3. Ekanem Ama
