= Adam Ephraim Adam I =

Obong of Calabar

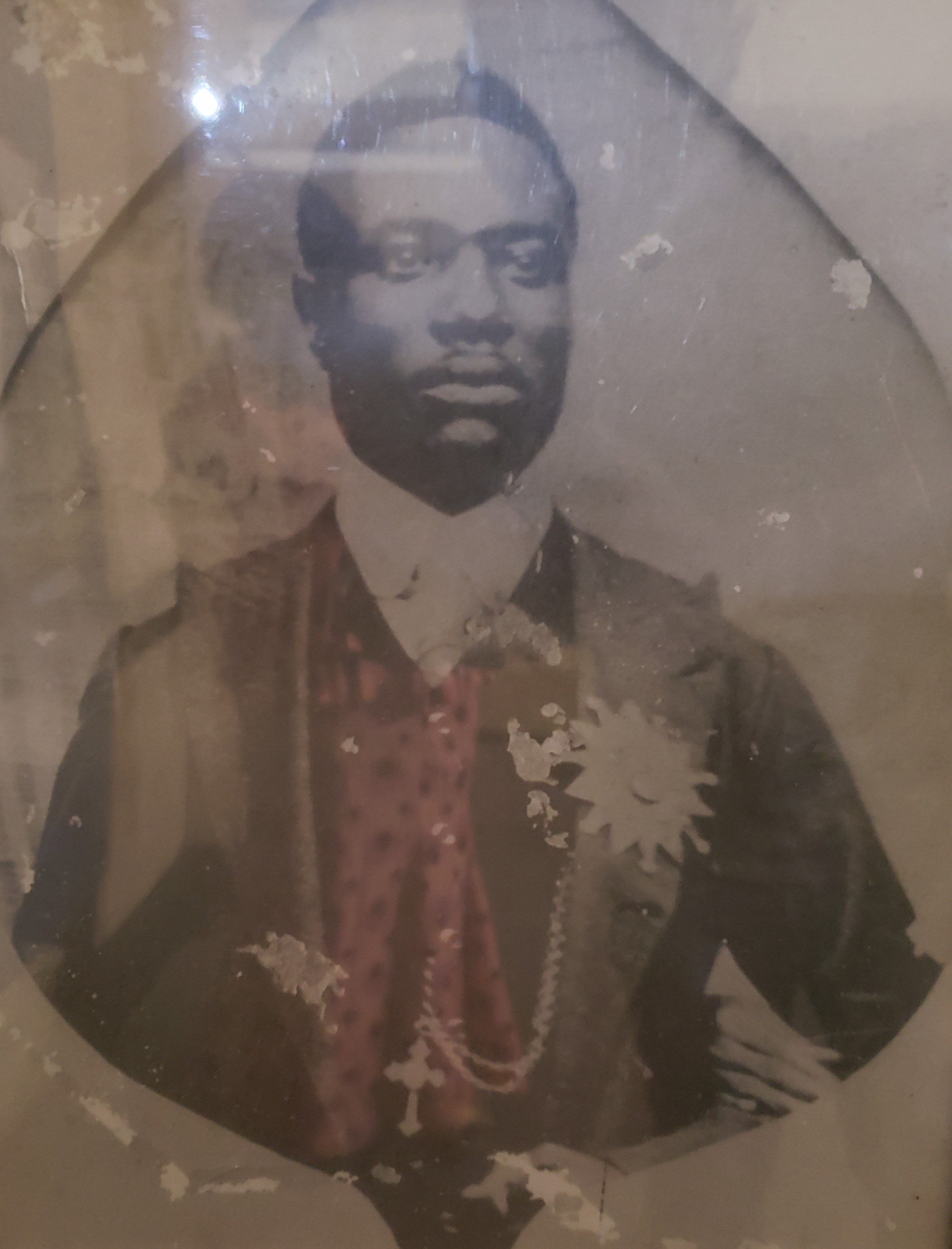

Obong of Calabar
- Reign: 1901–1906
- Predecessor: Orok Edem-Odo
- Successor: Archibong IV
- Wives: Iso Etim; Minika Ekpo Eyo
- House: Etim Efiom House (Note: At this time, Etim Efiom house was a sub-house of great Duke House. The house later achieved its autonomy in 1913. See Hart, p.152)
- Father: Ephraim Adam
- Mother: Akwa Edem Itu

Adam I (Edem Efiom Ededem Edak Edem Etim Efiom Okoho Efiom Ekpo Efiom Ekpo; c. 1849 – 1 July 1906) was the Obong of Calabar, Nigeria from 1901 until his death on 1 July 1906. (Note: At this time, the term "Old Calabar" was applicable to Duke Town and its dependencies which would exclude Creek Town and its dependencies)

Adam was born in Calabar, sometime around the reign of his 2nd cousin thrice removed Archibong I as the Obong of Calabar and its dependencies. He was the eldest son of Ephraim Adam of Etim Efiom royal house of Old Calabar. His mother Akwa Edem Itu was from Big Qua Town in the present-day Calabar.

== Early life ==
Obong Adam Ephraim Adam was born as "Edem Efiom Ededem". Although not much is known regarding his early life, he grew up under the care of his Father Ephraim Adam (Alias Tete), and his mother Akwa Edem Itu. Several records reveal that he was well educated having mastery of the Efik and the English language. On the death of his father in 1874, his aunty Queen Duke (Afiong Umo Edem) took control of the Ephraim Adam household. Adam was brought up under her tutelage and assumed the headship of his father's house after the death of Queen Duke in 1888. As a member of the Ekpe society, he held the Ekpe grade Murua Nkanda.

== Kingship ==
Prior to the ascension of Adam I to the stool of the Obong of Old Calabar, there was an interregnum within the leadership of Old Calabar. The interregnum began after the death of Obong Orok Edem Odo. The main cause of the interregnum was Prince Asibong Edem's vested interests in the stool of the Obong of Old Calabar. Due to disagreements in Calabar, Prince Asibong Edem left Calabar in Annoyance and moved to the present-day Asibong Town. In September 1900, Prince Asibong returned to Calabar and after much pressure was selected to be the Obong of Old Calabar. However, Prince Asibong died on September 21, 1900, which led to the initial preferred choice of Adam as the most suitable candidate.

== Administration ==
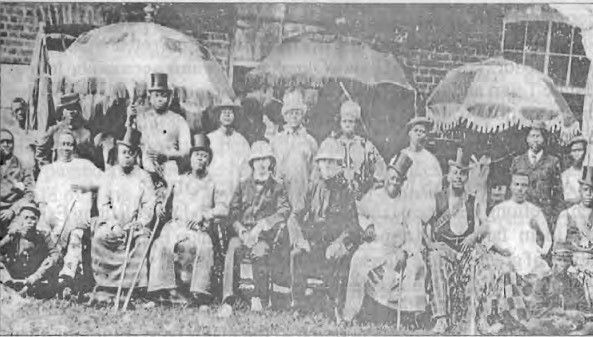
Old Calabar Rulers/Chiefs and British Officials at the official opening of the Calabar Watt Market, 1901. Sitting L-R: Ewa Henshaw; Ani Eniang Offiong; Ekpo Eyo Archibong; Obong Adam Ephraim Adam I; Obong of Calabar; T. D. Mac (A. D. C.); James Watt (District Comm.); Obong Ekpenyong Efiok, Obong of Creek Town, -1918); Daniel Henshaw; Harold Duke Henshaw; Richard Henshaw. Standing Left to Right: Okon Efiom Nsa; Prince Bassey Duke Ephraim; Asuquo Offiong Efiom; Bassey Ukorebi; Prince Adam Duke Ephraim; Efiong Ekpenyong Oku; Asuquo Ekpenyong Nsa.

The reign of Adam I was not easy as with more involvement from the colonial officers, the powers of the Obong were greatly limited. Nevertheless, the Kings of Old Calabar cooperated with the colonial officers to protect the interests of the Efik people. Adam I was a member of the Native Council of Old Calabar. These native councils set up by the High Commissioner Sir C. M. Macdonald in 1895 operated as the administrative and judicial body of Calabar. Obong Adam I was also present at the opening of Watt Market in 1901.

== Ancestry ==
Ancestors of Adam Ephraim Adam I

4. Edem Edak
10. Etim Efiom
9. Edem Etim
7. Edak Edem
2. Efiom Edem
5. Ekei
1. Adam Ephraim Adam
6. Edem Itu
8. Itu
3. Akwa Edem Itu

== Bibliography ==
- Nair, Kannan K. (1972), Politics and Society in South Eastern Nigeria, 1841–1906: A Study of Power, Diplomacy and Commerce in Old Calabar, London: Frank Cass, ISBN 0-7146-2296-6.
- Duke, Orok Orok Effiom (2008), Great Calabar Chronicle: People, World Events and Dates, 1500-2007, Calabar: Clinprint International, ISBN 978-978-016-624-3.
- Savage, Olayinka Margaret (1985). The Efik Political System: The Effervescence of Traditional Offices (PhD). University of Manchester.
- Duke House v. Eyo Ephraim Adam & others (The Supreme Court of the Colony of Southern Nigeria, Eastern Province, Calabar 1909).
- Duke, Orok Orok Effiom (2006), Three Famous Kings of Calabar, their lives and times(1908-1961), Calabar: Clear Lines Publications, ISBN 978-38524-3-4.
- Souvenir programme of the Coronation Service of his Royal Highness Edidem Bassey Eyo Ephraim Adam III, Calabar: The Government Printer, 1982.
- Efik Eburutu of Nigeria.
- Hart, A. Kalada (1964), Report of the Enquiry into the Dispute Over the Obongship of Calabar, Enugu: The Government Printer OCLC 32857131.
- Oku, Ekei Essien (1989), The Kings & Chiefs of Old Calabar (1785-1925), Calabar: Glad Tidings Press, ISBN 978-30541-0-4.
