= Watt Market =

Market in Calabar, Cross River

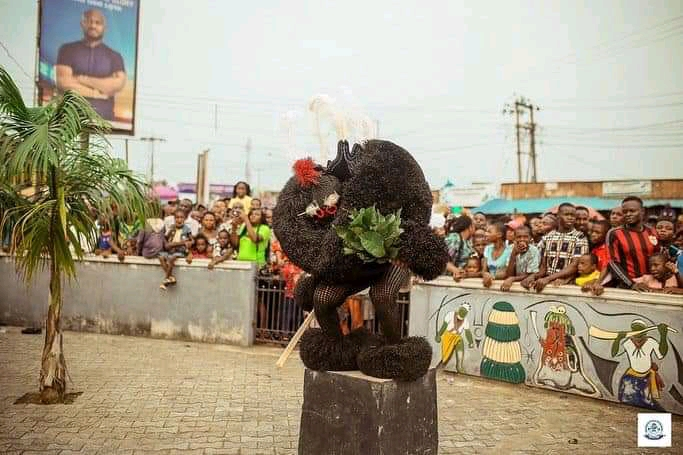
- crowd at Watt market roundabout
- Location: Calabar, Cross River State, Nigeria; 4.957642°N 8.321507°E
- Opening date: 1901
- Interactive map of Watt Market

Watt Market (Urua Awat) is a multipurpose marketplace located in Calabar, Cross River State, Nigeria. Established in 1901, it is the largest market in the state and a significant center of commerce and cultural exchange in the region. Watt Market sells all sorts of things, like food, clothes, and even electronics.

== History ==
=== Pre-colonial era ===
Calabar, originally known as Akwa Akpa by the dominant Efik people, was a major trading hub long before European arrival. Efik merchants participated in extensive trade networks, exchanging goods like palm oil, textiles, and slaves with neighboring communities and European traders who frequented the coast. Open-air markets likely existed in Calabar during this period, serving as central meeting points for commerce and social interaction.

=== Colonial influence ===
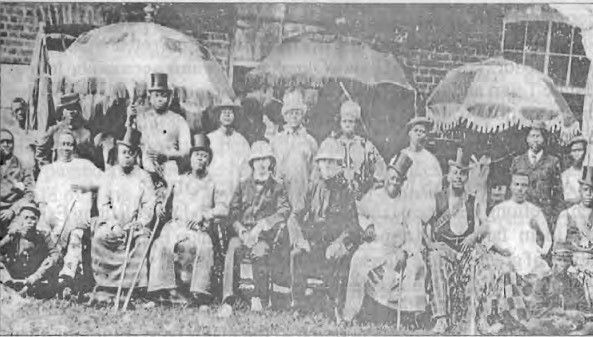
Chiefs and British Officials at the official opening of the Calabar Watt Market, 1901

The arrival of British colonial authorities in the late 19th century led to increased trade and the need for a more organized market space. James Watt, a British District Commissioner, played a key role in establishing a dedicated marketplace. The official opening in 1901 marked a shift from the more informal pre-colonial markets to a more structured space reflecting colonial influence.

=== Post-colonial development ===
After Nigeria gained independence in 1960, Watt Market continued to thrive as a vital economic and social center. However, challenges emerged such as overcrowding, limited infrastructure, and occasional fire incidents. Efforts to modernize the market have been ongoing over the decades.

== Fire incidents ==
Watt Market has been plagued by major fire incidents on multiple occasions, causing significant damage to stalls and goods.
